= Parliamentary constituencies in Gloucestershire =

The location of Gloucestershire in relation to England.

The county of Gloucestershire is divided into 7 parliamentary constituencies: 2 borough constituencies and 5 county constituencies, one of which crosses the county boundary with Wiltshire. (Note: South Cotswolds is a cross-county boundary constituency between Gloucestershire and Wiltshire.)

== Constituencies ==
Conservative † Labour ‡ Liberal Democrat ¤

Constituency (Note: BC denotes borough constituency, CC denotes county constituency.)	Electorate	Majority (Note: The majority is the number of votes the winning candidate receives more than their nearest rival.)	Member of Parliament	Nearest opposition	Electoral wards	Map
Cheltenham BC	75,292	7,210	Max Wilkinson ¤	Alex Chalk †	Cheltenham Borough Council: All Saints, Battledown, Benhall and The Reddings, Charlton Kings, Charlton Park, College, Hesters Way, Lansdown, Leckhampton, Oakley, Park, Pittville, St Mark's, St Paul's, St Peter's, Up Hatherley, Warden Hill.	
Forest of Dean CC	71,510	278	Matt Bishop ‡	Mark Harper †	Forest of Dean District Council: Berry Hill, Bream, Cinderford East, Cinderford West, Coleford, Dymock, Hartpury & Redmarley, Longhope & Huntley, Lydbrook, Lyndey East, Lyndey North, Lydney West & Aylburton, Mitcheldean, Ruardean & Drybrook, Newent & Taynton, Newland & Sling, Newnham, Pillowell, Ruspidge, St. Briavels, Tidenham, Westbury-on-Severn. Tewkesbury Borough Council: Highnam with Haw Bridge.	
Gloucester BC	76,695	3,431	Alex McIntyre ‡	Richard Graham †	Gloucester City Council: Abbeydale, Abbeymead, Barnwood, Barton & Tredworth, Coney Hill, Grange, Hucclecote, Kingsholm & Wotton, Kingsway, Matson & Robinswood, Moreland, Podsmead, Quedgeley Fieldcourt, Quedgeley Severn Vale, Tuffley, Westgate.	
North Cotswolds CC	70,915	3,357	Geoffrey Clifton-Brown †	Paul Hodgkinson ¤	Cotswold District Council: Blockley, Bourton Vale, Bourton Village, Campden & Vale, Chedworth & Churn Valley, Coln Valley, Ermin, Fosseridge, Moreton East, Moreton West, Northleach, Sandywell, Stow, The Rissingtons. Stroud District Council: Bisley, Hardwicke, Minchinhampton, Painswick & Upton. Tewkesbury District Council: Badgeworth, Brockworth East, Brockworth West, Churchdown Brookfield with Hucclecote, Churchdown St. Johns, Shurdington.	
South Cotswolds CC(part)	72,865	4,973	Roz Savage ¤	James Gray †	Cotswold District Council: Abbey, Chesterton, Fairford North, Four Acres, Grumbolds Ash with Avening, Kemble, Lechlade, Kempsford & Fairford South, New Mills, Siddington & Cerney Rural, South Cerney Village, St. Michael's, Stratton, Tetbury East & Rural, Tetbury Town, Tetbury with Upton, The Ampneys and Hampton, The Beeches, Watermoor. Stroud District Council: Kingswood. Wiltshire Council: Brinkworth, By Brook, Cricklade & Latton, Kington, Malmesbury, Minety, Purton, Sherston.	
Stroud CC	76,249	11,411	Simon Opher ‡	Siobhan Baillie †	Stroud District Council: Amberley and Woodchester, Berkeley Vale, Cainscross, Cam East, Cam West, Chalford, Coaley & Uley, Dursley, Nailsworth, Randwick, Whiteshill & Ruscombe, Rodborough, Severn, Stonehouse, Stroud Central, Stroud Farmhill & Paganhill, Stroud Slade, Stroud Trinity, Stroud Uplands, Stroud Valley, The Stanleys, Thrupp, Wotton-under-Edge.	
Tewkesbury CC	72,426	6,262	Cameron Thomas ¤	Laurence Robertson †	Cheltenham Borough Council: Prestbury, Springbank, Swindon Village. Gloucester City Council: Elmbridge, Longstevens. Tewkesbury Borough Council: Cleeve Grange, Cleeve Hill, Cleeve St. Michael's, Cleeve West, Innsworth, Isbourne, Northway, Severn Vale North, Severn Vale South, Tewkesbury East, Tewkesbury North & Twyning, Tewkesbury South, Winchcombe.	

== Boundary changes ==
=== 2024 ===
See 2023 Periodic Review of Westminster constituencies for further details.

Former Name	Boundaries 2010–2024	Current Name	Boundaries 2024–present
1. Cheltenham BC; 2. The Cotswolds CC; 3. Forest of Dean CC; 4. Gloucester BC; 5. Stroud CC; 6. Tewkesbury CC	Parliamentary constituencies in Gloucestershire (2010-2024)	1. Cheltenham BC; 2. Forest of Dean CC; 3. Gloucester BC; 4. North Cotswolds CC; 5. South Cotswolds CC; 6. Stroud CC; 7. Tewkesbury CC	Parliamentary constituencies in Gloucestershire (2024-present

For the 2023 Periodic Review of Westminster constituencies, which redrew the constituency map ahead of the 2024 United Kingdom general election, the Boundary Commission for England opted to combine Gloucestershire with Wiltshire as a sub-region of the South West Region, with the creation of the cross-county boundary constituency of South Cotswolds, resulting in a major reconfiguration of the former The Cotswolds constituency, which was renamed North Cotswolds. These changes came into effect for the 2024 general election.

The following seats resulted from the boundary review:

Containing electoral wards from Cheltenham

- Cheltenham
- Tewkesbury (part)

Containing electoral wards in Cotswold

- North Cotswolds (part)
- South Cotswolds (part also in Wiltshire)

Containing electoral wards in Forest of Dean

- Forest of Dean (part)

Containing wards in Gloucester

- Gloucester
- Tewkesbury (part)

Containing wards in Stroud

- North Cotswolds (part)
- South Cotswolds (part)
- Stroud

Containing wards in Tewkesbury

- Forest of Dean (part)
- North Cotswolds (part)
- Tewkesbury (part)

=== 2010 ===
Under the Fifth Periodic Review of Westminster constituencies, the Boundary Commission for England decided to retain Gloucestershire's constituencies for the 2010 election, making minor changes to realign constituency boundaries with the boundaries of current local government wards, and to reduce the electoral disparity between constituencies. Although the changes were minor, the Cotswold constituency was renamed The Cotswolds.

Name	Boundaries 1997–2010	Boundaries 2010–2024
1. Cheltenham BC; 2. Cotswold CC / The Cotswolds CC; 3. Forest of Dean CC; 4. Gloucester BC; 5. Stroud CC; 6. Tewkesbury CC	Parliamentary constituencies in Gloucestershire	Proposed Revision

== Results history ==
Primary data source: House of Commons research briefing - General election results from 1918 to 2019

=== 2024 ===
The number of votes cast for each political party who fielded candidates in constituencies comprising Gloucestershire in the 2024 general election were as follows: (Note: It should be acknowledged that South Cotswolds is a cross-county boundary constituency. As the results of UK general elections are not disclosed on a sub-constituency level, and South Cotswolds has a relatively evenly split of voters in Gloucestershire and Wiltshire, the below vote shares include the electoral wards of the constituency located in Wiltshire.)

Party	Votes	%	Change from 2019	Seats	Change from 2019
Conservative	111,103	31.8%	▼22.4%	1	▼5
Liberal Democrat	93,112	26.6%	▲9.5%	3	▲3
Labour	77,973	22.3%	▼0.6%	3	▲3
Reform	39,478	11.3%	▲11.0%	0	0
Green	23,559	6.7%	▲1.8	0	0
Others	4,399	1.3%	▲0.6%	0	0
Total	349,624	100.0		7	

=== 2019 ===
The number of votes cast for each political party who fielded candidates in constituencies comprising Gloucestershire in the 2019 general election were as follows:

Party	Votes	%	Change from 2017	Seats	Change from 2017
Conservative	191,119	54.2%	▲1.3%	6	▲1
Labour	80,776	22.9%	▼5.8%	0	▼1
Liberal Democrats	60,431	17.1%	▲3.0%	0	0
Greens	17,116	4.9%	▲2.7%	0	0
Brexit	1,085	0.3%	new	0	0
Others	2,315	0.7%	▼1.5%	0	0
Total	352,842	100.0		6	

=== Percentage votes ===
Note that before 1983 Gloucestershire covered a wider and much more populous area than it does today, including the north of what became Avon and the city of Bristol.

Election year	1922	1924	1929	1931	1945	1950	1951	1955	1959	1964	1966	1970	1974 (F)	1974 (O)	1979	1983	1987	1992	1997	2001	2005	2010	2015	2017	2019	2024
Conservative^{1}	35.5	39.8	31.6	59.9	36.9	40.2	47.8	45.46	49.0	43.72	44.4	48.6	39.8	40.2	47.8	50.7	50.4	47.4	39.4	40.9	41.7	44.8	49.2	52.9	54.2	31.8
Liberal Democrat^{2}	15.8	25.2	25.5	8.5	11.5	10.8	1.2	1.7	7.3	11.3	6.6	8.9	24.2	21.1	16.4	32.1	28.7	28.3	22.5	21.9	23.3	28.7	13.4	14.1	17.1	26.6
Labour	30.6	35.0	39.7	31.6	51.6	46.9	51.0	45.42	43.6	43.64	48.7	42.4	35.4	38.2	34.9	16.7	20.8	23.1	33.9	33.7	29.3	21.0	21.0	28.7	22.9	22.3
Reform^{3}		-	-	-	-	-	-	-	-	-	-	-	-	-	-	-	-	-	-	-	-	-	-	-	0.3	11.3
Green Party		-	-	-	-	-	-	-	-	-	-	-	-	-	-	-	*	*	*	*	*	1.4	4.4	2.2	4.9	6.7
UKIP		-	-	-	-	-	-	-	-	-	-	-	-	-	-	-	-	-	*	*	*	3.6	11.6	1.8	*	*
Other	18.1	-	3.2	-	6.2	2.1	-	7.4	-	1.4	0.4	0.04	0.6	0.4	0.9	0.4	.01	1.2	4.2	3.5	5.7	0.6	0.3	0.3	0.6	1.3

^{1}including National Liberal

^{2}1950-1979: Liberal Party; 1983 & 1987 - SDP–Liberal Alliance

^{3} As the Brexit Party in 2019

* Included in Other

Accurate vote percentages cannot be obtained for the elections of 1918, 1923 and 1935 because at least one candidate stood unopposed.

=== Seats ===
Election year	1950	1951	1955	1959	1964	1966	1970	1974 (F)	1974 (O)	1979	1983	1987	1992	1997	2001	2005	2010	2015	2017	2019	2024
Labour	7	7	7	5	5	7	4	5	6	3	0	0	0	3	3	2	0	0	1	0	3
Liberal Democrat^{1}	0	0	0	0	0	0	0	0	0	0	0	0	1	1	1	1	1	0	0	0	3
Conservative^{2}	5	5	4	7	7	5	8	7	6	9	5	5	4	2	2	3	5	6	5	6	1
Speaker			1																		
Total	12	12	12	12	12	12	12	12	12	12	5	5	5	6	6	6	6	6	6	6	7

^{1}including National Liberal

^{2}1950-1979: Liberal Party; 1983 & 1987 - SDP–Liberal Alliance

=== Maps ===
==== 1885-1910 ====
1885

1886

1892

1895

1900

1906

Jan 1910

Dec 1910

==== 1918-1945 ====
1918

1922

1923

1924

1929

1931

1935

1945

==== 1950-1979 ====
1950

1951

1955

1959

1964

1966

1970

Feb 1974

Oct 1974

1979

==== 1983-2019 ====
1983

1987

1992

1997

2001

2005

2010

2015

2017

2019

==== 2024-present ====
2024

== Historical representation by party ==
A cell marked → (with a different colour background to the preceding cell) indicates that the previous MP continued to sit under a new party name.

=== 1885 to 1918 (11 seats) ===
Conservative Liberal Liberal Unionist

Constituency	1885	1886	87	90	1892	92	93	95	1895	1900	1906	Jan 1910	Dec 1910	11	16
Bristol East	Cossham			Weston				Wills		Hobhouse					
Bristol North	Fry	→			Townsend				Fry	Wills	Birrell				
Bristol South	Weston	Hill								Long	Davies				
Bristol West	M. E. Hicks-Beach										Gibbs				
Cheltenham	Agg-Gardner								Russell	Agg-Gardner	Sears	Ponsonby	Mathias	Agg-Gardner	
Cirencester	Winterbotham	→			→	Chester-Master	Lawson		Bathurst		Essex	Bathurst			
Forest of Dean	Blake		Samuelson		Dilke									Webb	
Gloucester	Robinson								Monk	Rea		Terrell			
Stroud	Brand	Holloway			Jones				Cripps	Allen					
Tewkesbury	Yorke	Dorington									M. H. Hicks Beach				W. F. Hicks-Beach
Thornbury	Howard	Plunkett			Colston						Rendall				

=== 1918 to 1950 (11 seats) ===
Coalition Liberal (1918-22) / National Liberal (1922-23) Conservative Independent Conservative Independent Labour Independent National Labour Liberal National Labour National Liberal (1931-68)

Constituency	1918	1922	1923	1924	25	28	1929	31	1931	1935	36	37	39	43	1945
Bristol Central	Inskip						Alpass		A. Apsley					V. Apsley	Awbery
Bristol East	Britton	Morris	Baker					Cripps					→		→
Bristol North	Gange	C. Guest	Ayles	F. Guest			Ayles		Bernays		→				Coldrick
Bristol South	Davies	Rees	→				Walkden		Lindsay	Walkden					Wilkins
Bristol West	Gibbs					Culverwell									Stanley
Cheltenham	Agg-Gardner					Preston						Lipson			→
Cirencester & Tewkesbury	Davies						Morrison								
Forest of Dean	Wignall				Purcell		Vaughan		Worthington	Price					
Gloucester	Bruton		Horlick				Boyce								Turner-Samuels
Stroud	Lister	Tubbs	F. Guest	Nelson				Perkins							Parkin
Thornbury	Rendall	Woodcock	Rendall	Gunston											Alpass

=== 1950 to 1983 (12 seats) ===
Conservative Labour National Liberal (1931-68) Speaker

Constituency	1950	50	51	51	51	55	57	1959	61	63	1964	1966	1970	Feb 74	Oct 74	1979
Bristol Central	Awbery										Palmer					
Bristol North East	Coldrick							Hopkins				Dobson	Adley	Palmer		
Bristol North West	Braithwaite					Boyd		McLaren				Ellis	McLaren		Thomas	Colvin
Bristol South	Wilkins												Cocks			
Bristol South East	Cripps	Benn							St Clair	Benn						
Bristol West	Stanley		Monckton				Cooke									Waldegrave
Cheltenham	W. W. Hicks-Beach										Dodds-Parker				Irving	
Cirencester and Tewkesbury	Morrison				→			Ridley								
Gloucester	Turner-Samuels						Diamond						Oppenheim			
Gloucestershire South	Crosland					Corfield								Cope		
Gloucestershire West	Price							Loughlin							Watkinson	Marland
Stroud & Thornbury / Stroud ('55)	Perkins					Kershaw										
Kingswood														Walker		Aspinwall

=== 1983 to 2010 (5, then 6 seats) ===
Conservative Labour Liberal Democrats

Constituency	1983	1987	1992	1997	2001	2005
Cheltenham	Irving		Jones			Horwood
Cirencester & Tewkesbury / Tewkesbury (1997)	Ridley		Clifton-Brown	Robertson		
Gloucester	Oppenheim	French		Kingham	Dhanda	
Stroud	Kershaw	Knapman		Drew		
West Gloucestershire / Forest of Dean (1997)	Marland			Organ		Harper
Cotswold				Clifton-Brown		

=== 2010 to present (6, then 6.5 seats) ===
Conservative Labour Liberal Democrats

Constituency	2010	2015	2017	2019	2024
Cheltenham	Horwood	Chalk			Wilkinson
The Cotswolds / North Cotswolds (2024)	Clifton-Brown				
Forest of Dean	Harper				Bishop
Gloucester	Graham				McIntyre
Stroud	Carmichael		Drew	Baillie	Opher
Tewkesbury	Robertson				Thomas
South Cotswolds^{1}					Savage

^{1}Just under half this seat's electorate lies in Wiltshire.

== See also ==
- List of parliamentary constituencies in Avon for divisions in South Gloucestershire and Bristol.
- List of constituencies in South West England
