= Stroud by-election =

Stroud by-election may refer to:

- January 1874 Stroud by-election
- May 1874 Stroud by-election
- July 1874 Stroud by-election
- 1875 Stroud by-election
- 1931 Stroud by-election
