= Walter John Stanton =

English civil engineer, woollen manufacturer and Liberal Party politician

Walter John Stanton (24 March 1828 – 2 August 1913) was an English civil engineer, woollen manufacturer and a Liberal Party politician. He sat in the House of Commons briefly in 1874 and from 1880 to 1885. He was also one of the successors to (Marling School), Stroud

== Early life ==
Stanton was the son of Charles Stanton of Upfield Stroud and his wife Martha Holbrow, daughter of Thomas Holbrow. His uncle William Henry Stanton had been a Member of Parliament (MP) for the borough of Stroud from 1841 to 1852.

He was educated at Westminster School and originally became a civil engineer, studying under Joseph Locke.

== Career ==
Later he became a woollen manufacturer and a J.P. for Gloucestershire and a captain in the 2nd Gloucestershire Rifle Volunteers. From 1861 to 1874 he was chairman of the Stroud Local Board. Along with other members of his family, he ran a major carpet-manufacturing business in Shrewsbury.

At the 1874 general election Stanton was elected as an MP for the borough of Stroud, but his election was voided on petition. The election court ruled that his agent had openly used treating and entertainments. His cousin Alfred Stanton was elected in his place, and at the 1880 general election, and Alfred stood aside and Walter was re-elected, holding the seat until 1885.

At the 1885 general election, the two-seat parliamentary borough of Stroud was abolished, and the town became part of a larger single-seat division of Gloucestershire. Stroud's other Liberal MP, Henry Brand, was chosen to contest the new seat, and narrowly won it. However, he later joined the breakaway Liberal Unionists, and at the 1886 general election Stanton was again the Liberal candidate in Stroud. Brand stood unsuccessfully in Cardiff Boroughs, and in Stroud Stanton was beaten by the Conservative candidate George Holloway.

Stanton died at the age of 85, on 2 August 1913. His funeral was held in Stroud Parish Church.

== Family ==
In 1865 Stanton married Mary Capel, the daughter of William Capel of Stroud.

Parliament of the United Kingdom
Preceded by John Dorington; Sebastian Dickinson	Member of Parliament for Stroud; Feb 1874 – May 1874; With: Sebastian Dickinson	Succeeded by John Dorington; Alfred John Stanton
Preceded by Alfred John Stanton; Samuel Stephens Marling	Member of Parliament for Stroud; 1880 – 1885; With: Henry Brand	Succeeded by Henry Brand
