= Henry Brand =

Henry Brand may refer to:

- Henry Brand, 1st Viscount Hampden (1814–1892), British politician
- Henry Brand, 2nd Viscount Hampden (1841–1906), British politician

== See also ==
- H. W. Brands (born Henry William Brands Jr., 1953), American historian
