= Stroud (constituency) =

Parliamentary constituency in the United Kingdom, 1955 onwards

- County constituency for the House of Commons
- Interactive map of boundaries since 2024
- Boundary of Stroud in South West England
- County: Gloucestershire
- Electorate: 76,249 (2023)
- Major settlements: Stroud, Dursley, Nailsworth and Stonehouse

Current constituency
- Created: 1955
- Member of Parliament: Simon Opher (Labour)
- Seats: One
- Created from: Stroud & Thornbury

1885–1950
- Seats: One
- Type of constituency: County constituency
- Replaced by: Stroud & Thornbury

1832–1885
- Seats: Two
- Type of constituency: Borough constituency
- Created from: Gloucestershire

Stroud is a constituency represented in the House of Commons of the UK Parliament. It is held by Simon Opher of the Labour Party, who won the seat from Siobhan Baillie of the Conservatives in 2024.

== Constituency profile ==
Stroud

Stroud is a constituency in Gloucestershire in South West England. It is named after its largest town, Stroud, which has a population of around 27,000. Other settlements include the towns of Cainscross, Stonehouse, Nailsworth, Dursley, Berkeley and Wotton-under-Edge and the villages of Rodborough, Chalford and Cam.

This is a mostly rural constituency covering the small market towns and villages to the south of Gloucester. The east of the constituency around the town of Stroud lies within the Cotswolds. Unusually for South West England, Stroud has an industrial heritage as a mill town; the steep river valleys and nearby rural hills on which sheep grazed made it a prime location for wool production. The constituency is mostly affluent with low levels of deprivation, especially in the small villages. Stroud was named the best place to live in the UK by the The Sunday Times in 2021. The constituency also includes Sharpness, an important port on the River Severn. House prices across the constituency are generally similar to the regional and national averages.

The Stroud constituency has a large retired population and low proportions of young and middle-aged adults. Residents have above-average levels of income and homeownership and the child poverty rate is low. They have average levels of education and a high proportion work in the manufacturing sector. The percentage of residents claiming unemployment benefits is low. White people made up 97% of the population at the 2021 census.

At the local council level, the constituency's main population centres (Stroud, its connected towns and villages, and the adjacent Cam and Dursley) are mostly represented by the Labour Party. The rural areas in the east, within the Cotwolds, elected Green Party councillors whilst the western rural areas along the River Severn elected Conservatives. An estimated 54% of voters in the Stroud constituency supported remaining in the European Union in the 2016 referendum, higher than the UK-wide figure of 48%.

== History ==
The seat's parliamentary borough forerunner was created by the First Reform Act for the 1832 general election. It elected two MPs using the bloc vote until transformed in the Redistribution of Seats Act 1885 for that year's general election, the name being transferred to a single-seat county division which covered a wider zone.

This was abolished at the 1950 general election, chiefly replaced with a new seat, Stroud and Thornbury. That was in turn abolished at the 1955 general election, when the present entity was created. Since this recreation the seat has had boundary changes.

Formerly a safe Conservative seat, Stroud has been a marginal seat since 1997, changing hands five times in eight elections (in 1997, 2010, 2017, 2019 and 2024).

== Boundaries ==
Map of 2010-2024 boundaries

1955–1974: The Urban Districts of Nailsworth and Stroud, the Rural Districts of Dursley, Stroud, and Tetbury, and part of the Rural District of Gloucester.

1974–1983: The Urban Districts of Nailsworth and Stroud, the Rural Districts of Dursley, Stroud, and Tetbury, and in the Rural District of Gloucester the parishes of Arlingham, Brookthorpe with Whaddon, Eastington, Elmore, Frampton on Severn, Fretherne with Saul, Frocester, Hardwicke, Harescombe, Haresfield, Longney, Moreton Valence, Quedgeley, Standish, Upton St Leonards, and Whitminster.

1983–1997: The District of Stroud wards of Berkeley, Bisley, Cainscross, Cam, Cambridge, Central, Chalford, Dursley, Eastington, Hinton, King's Stanley, Leonard Stanley, Minchinhampton, Nailsworth, Nibley, Painswick, Parklands, Randwick, Rodborough, Severn, Stonehouse, Thrupp, Trinity, Uley, Uplands, Vale, Whiteshill, Woodfield, and Wotton and Kingswood, and the District of Cotswold wards of Avening, Grumbold's Ash, and Tetbury.

1997–2010: All the wards of the District of Stroud except the Wotton and Kingswood ward.

2010–2024: The District of Stroud wards of Amberley and Woodchester, Berkeley, Bisley, Cainscross, Cam East, Cam West, Central, Chalford, Coaley and Uley, Dursley, Eastington and Standish, Farmhill and Paganhill, Hardwicke, Nailsworth, Over Stroud, Painswick, Rodborough, Severn, Slade, Stonehouse, The Stanleys, Thrupp, Trinity, Uplands, Upton St Leonards, Vale, and Valley.

The seat had 24 of the 27 wards of Stroud district (the rest were in The Cotswolds seat). The north-west limit is the Severn, which meanders from Gloucester as the upper estuary.

2024–present: Further to the 2023 review of Westminster constituencies which came into effect for the 2024 general election the constituency is composed of the following (as they existed on 1 December 2020):

- The District of Stroud wards of: Amberley and Woodchester; Berkeley Vale; Cainscross; Cam East; Cam West; Chalford; Coaley & Uley; Dursley; Nailsworth; Randwick, Whiteshill & Ruscombe; Rodborough; Severn; Stonehouse; Stroud Central; Stroud Farmhill & Paganhill; Stroud Slade; Stroud Trinity; Stroud Uplands; Stroud Valley; The Stanleys; Thrupp; Wotton-under-Edge.

In order to bring the electorate within the permitted range, northern areas, including the communities of Bisley, Hardwicke and Painswick, were transferred to the newly created constituency of North Cotswolds. Wotton-under-Edge was added from The Cotswolds (abolished 2024).

== Members of Parliament ==
=== Stroud parliamentary borough ===
==== MPs 1832–1885 ====
Election	Member	Party	Member	Party
1832	David Ricardo	Whig	William Henry Hyett	Whig
1833 by-election	George Poulett Scrope	Whig	William Henry Hyett	Whig
1835	George Poulett Scrope	Whig	Charles Richard Fox	Whig
May 1835 by-election	George Poulett Scrope	Whig	Lord John Russell	Whig
1841	George Poulett Scrope	Whig	William Henry Stanton	Whig
1852	George Poulett Scrope	Whig	Lord Moreton	Whig
1853 by-election	George Poulett Scrope	Whig	Edward Horsman	Whig
1859	George Poulett Scrope	Liberal	Edward Horsman	Liberal
1867 by-election	Henry Winterbotham	Liberal	Edward Horsman	Liberal
1868	Henry Winterbotham	Liberal	Sebastian Dickinson	Liberal
Jan. 1874 by-election	John Dorington	Conservative	Sebastian Dickinson	Liberal
1874	Walter John Stanton	Liberal	Sebastian Dickinson	Liberal
May 1874 by-election	John Dorington	Conservative	Alfred John Stanton	Liberal
July 1874 by-election	Henry Brand	Liberal	Alfred John Stanton	Liberal
1875 by-election	Samuel Marling	Liberal	Alfred John Stanton	Liberal
1880	Walter John Stanton	Liberal	Henry Brand	Liberal
1880	Parliamentary borough abolished. Name transferred to a new county division			

=== Stroud division of Gloucestershire ===
==== MPs 1885–1950 ====
Election	Member	Party
1885	Henry Brand	Liberal
1886	George Holloway	Conservative
1892	David Brynmor Jones	Liberal
1895	Charles Cripps	Conservative
1900	Charles Allen	Liberal
1918	Sir Ashton Lister	Liberal
1922	Stanley Tubbs	Conservative
1923	Frederick Guest	Liberal
1924	Sir Frank Nelson	Unionist
1931 by-election	Walter Perkins	Conservative
1945	Ben Parkin	Labour
1950	constituency abolished. See Stroud & Thornbury	

=== Stroud County Constituency ===
==== MPs since 1955 ====
Election	Member	Party
1955	Sir Anthony Kershaw	Conservative
1987	Roger Knapman	Conservative
1997	David Drew	Labour Co-op
2010	Neil Carmichael	Conservative
2017	David Drew	Labour Co-op
2019	Siobhan Baillie	Conservative
2024	Simon Opher	Labour

== Elections ==
=== Elections in the 2020s ===
General election 2024: Stroud
Party	Candidate	Votes	%	±%
Labour	Simon Opher	25,607	46.4	+4.8
Conservative	Siobhan Baillie	14,219	25.7	−20.0
Reform	Chris Lester	6,329	11.5	+10.0
Green	Pete Kennedy	5,729	10.4	+2.4
Liberal Democrats	George James	2,913	5.3	+3.1
Independent	Saskia Whitfield	261	0.5	N/A
Volt	Jason Hughes	163	0.3	N/A
Majority		11,411	20.7	N/A
Turnout		55,221	70.9	−8.7
Registered electors		77,912		
Labour gain from Conservative		Swing	▲12.4	

=== Elections in the 2010s ===
2019 notional result
Party	Vote	%
Conservative	27,733	45.7
Labour	25,266	41.6
Green	4,857	8.0
Liberal Democrats	1,356	2.2
Brexit Party	909	1.5
Others	567	0.9
Turnout	60,688	79.6
Electorate	76,249	

General election 2019: Stroud
Party	Candidate	Votes	%	±%
Conservative	Siobhan Baillie	31,582	47.9	+2.0
Labour Co-op	David Drew	27,742	42.1	−4.9
Green	Molly Scott Cato	4,954	7.5	+5.3
Brexit Party	Desi Latimer	1,085	1.6	N/A
Libertarian	Glenville Gogerly	567	0.9	N/A
Majority		3,840	5.8	N/A
Turnout		65,930	78.0	+1.0
Registered electors		84,536		+2.0
Conservative gain from Labour Co-op		Swing	+3.5	

General election 2017: Stroud
Party	Candidate	Votes	%	±%
Labour Co-op	David Drew	29,994	47.0	+9.3
Conservative	Neil Carmichael	29,307	45.9	+0.2
Liberal Democrats	Max Wilkinson	2,053	3.2	−0.2
Green	Sarah Lunnon	1,423	2.2	−2.4
UKIP	Glenville Gogerly	1,039	1.6	−6.4
Majority		687	1.1	N/A
Turnout		63,816	77.0	+1.5
Registered electors		82,839		+2.8
Labour Co-op gain from Conservative		Swing	+4.5	

General election 2015: Stroud
Party	Candidate	Votes	%	±%
Conservative	Neil Carmichael	27,813	45.7	+4.9
Labour Co-op	David Drew	22,947	37.7	−0.9
UKIP	Caroline Stephens	4,848	8.0	+5.8
Green	Sarah Lunnon	2,779	4.6	+1.9
Liberal Democrats	Adrian Walker-Smith	2,086	3.4	−12.0
Independent	Richard Wilson	246	0.4	N/A
Free Public Transport	David Michael	100	0.2	N/A
Majority		4,866	8.0	+5.8
Turnout		60,819	75.5	+1.4
Registered electors		80,544		+2.9
Conservative hold		Swing	+2.9	

General election 2010: Stroud
Party	Candidate	Votes	%	±%
Conservative	Neil Carmichael	23,679	40.8	+2.5
Labour Co-op	David Drew	22,380	38.6	−1.5
Liberal Democrats	Dennis Andrewartha	8,955	15.4	+1.5
Green	Martin Whiteside	1,542	2.7	−3.0
UKIP	Steve Parker	1,301	2.2	+0.3
Independent	Alan Lomas	116	0.2	N/A
Majority		1,299	2.2	N/A
Turnout		57,973	74.1	+3.9
Registered electors		78,286		+2.1
Conservative gain from Labour Co-op		Swing	+2.0	

=== Elections in the 2000s ===
General election 2005: Stroud
Party	Candidate	Votes	%	±%
Labour Co-op	David Drew	22,527	39.6	−7.0
Conservative	Neil Carmichael	22,177	39.0	+1.6
Liberal Democrats	Peter Hirst	8,026	14.1	+3.2
Green	Martin Whiteside	3,056	5.4	+1.9
UKIP	Edward Noble	1,089	1.9	+0.3
Majority		350	0.6	−8.6
Turnout		56,875	71.3	+1.4
Registered electors		79,757		+1.1
Labour Co-op hold		Swing	−4.3	

General election 2001: Stroud
Party	Candidate	Votes	%	±%
Labour Co-op	David Drew	25,685	46.6	+3.9
Conservative	Neil Carmichael	20,646	37.4	−0.5
Liberal Democrats	Janice Beasley	6,036	10.9	−4.6
Green	Kevin Cranston	1,913	3.5	−0.4
UKIP	Adrian Blake	895	1.6	N/A
Majority		5,039	9.2	+4.4
Turnout		55,175	69.9	−9.3
Registered electors		78,878		+1.8
Labour Co-op hold		Swing	+2.2	

=== Elections in the 1990s ===
General election 1997: Stroud
Party	Candidate	Votes	%	±%
Labour Co-op	David Drew	26,170	42.7	+13.3
Conservative	Roger Knapman	23,260	37.9	−8.3
Liberal Democrats	Paul Hodgkinson	9,502	15.5	−6.1
Green	John Marjoram	2,415	3.9	+1.2
Majority		2,910	4.8	N/A
Turnout		61,347	79.2	−4.3
Registered electors		77,494		+3.0
Labour Co-op gain from Conservative		Swing	+10.8	

General election 1992: Stroud
Party	Candidate	Votes	%	±%
Conservative	Roger Knapman	32,201	46.2	−4.0
Labour	David Drew	18,796	26.9	+8.4
Liberal Democrats	Myles Robinson	16,751	24.0	−7.3
Green	Sue Atkinson	2,005	2.9	N/A
Majority		13,405	19.3	+0.4
Turnout		69,753	84.5	+3.9
Registered electors		82,553		+1.6
Conservative hold		Swing	−6.2	

=== Elections in the 1980s ===
General election 1987: Stroud
Party	Candidate	Votes	%	±%
Conservative	Roger Knapman	32,883	50.2	−1.1
Liberal	Adrian Walker-Smith	20,508	31.3	−0.6
Labour	Tom Levitt	12,145	18.5	+1.7
Majority		12,375	18.9	−0.5
Turnout		65,553	80.6	+2.9
Registered electors		81,275		+4.8
Conservative hold		Swing	−0.3	

General election 1983: Stroud
Party	Candidate	Votes	%	±%
Conservative	Anthony Kershaw	30,896	51.3	−1.2
Liberal	Gerald Fallon	19,182	31.9	+4.2
Labour	David Parsons	10,141	16.8	−3.0
Majority		11,714	19.4	−5.4
Turnout		60,219	77.7	−8.3
Registered electors		77,528		+7.0
Conservative hold		Swing	−2.7	

=== Elections in the 1970s ===
General election 1979: Stroud
Party	Candidate	Votes	%	±%
Conservative	Anthony Kershaw	32,534	52.6	+8.8
Labour	B.J. Marshall	17,037	27.5	−3.6
Liberal	James Heppell	12,314	19.9	−4.8
Majority		15,497	25.1	+12.4
Turnout		61,885	81.3	+0.9
Registered electors		76,137		+9.7
Conservative hold		Swing	+6.2	

General election October 1974: Stroud
Party	Candidate	Votes	%	±%
Conservative	Anthony Kershaw	24,406	43.8	+0.2
Labour Co-op	Bill Maddocks	17,352	31.1	+1.9
Liberal	Mrs S. Anne. Ritchie	13,756	24.7	−1.7
United Democratic Party	John S. Churchill	241	0.4	−0.4
Majority		7,054	12.7	−1.7
Turnout		55,755	80.4	−5.0
Registered electors		69,381		+0.8
Conservative hold		Swing	+6.2	

General election February 1974: Stroud
Party	Candidate	Votes	%	±%
Conservative	Anthony Kershaw	25,619	43.6	−7.5
Labour Co-op	Bill Maddocks	17,148	29.2	−6.9
Liberal	Mrs S. Anne. Ritchie	15,521	26.4	+13.6
Powell Conservative	John S. Churchill	470	0.8	N/A
Majority		8,471	14.4	−0.6
Turnout		58,758	85.4	+5.1
Registered electors		68,805		
Conservative hold				

General election 1970: Stroud
Party	Candidate	Votes	%	±%
Conservative	Anthony Kershaw	27,089	51.1	+7.9
Labour	R. Derek Wheatley	19,158	36.1	−4.0
Liberal	David M. Davies	6,799	12.8	−3.8
Majority		7,931	15.0	+11.9
Turnout		53,046	80.3	−5.7
Registered electors		66,072		+12.4
Conservative hold		Swing	+5.9	

=== Elections in the 1960s ===
General election 1966: Stroud
Party	Candidate	Votes	%	±%
Conservative	Anthony Kershaw	21,804	43.2	−0.9
Labour	Tom Cox	20,259	40.1	+1.9
Liberal	John V. Smith	8,397	16.6	−1.1
Majority		1,545	3.1	−2.8
Turnout		50,460	85.0	+0.6
Registered electors		58,779		+1.5
Conservative hold		Swing	−1.4	

General election 1964: Stroud
Party	Candidate	Votes	%	±%
Conservative	Anthony Kershaw	21,802	44.1	−4.0
Labour	Dennis V. Hunt	18,889	38.2	+0.6
Liberal	Iain P. Crawford	8,747	17.7	+3.4
Majority		2,913	5.9	−4.6
Turnout		49,438	85.4	+0.2
Registered electors		57,906		+1.2
Conservative hold		Swing	−2.3	

=== Elections in the 1950s ===
General election 1959: Stroud
Party	Candidate	Votes	%	±%
Conservative	Anthony Kershaw	23,448	48.1	−1.3
Labour	Alfred Evans	18,336	37.6	−3.5
Liberal	Clement John McNair, 2nd Baron McNair	6,988	14.3	+4.8
Majority		5,112	10.5	+2.2
Turnout		48,772	85.2	+0.9
Registered electors		57,220		+2.2
Conservative hold		Swing	+1.1	

General election 1955: Stroud
Party	Candidate	Votes	%	±%
Conservative	Anthony Kershaw	23,318	49.4	
Labour	Richard W. Evely	19,375	41.1	
Liberal	Eric Barnett Ayliffe	4,489	9.5	
Majority		3,943	8.3	
Turnout		47,182	84.3	
Registered electors		55,962		
Conservative win (new seat)				

=== Election in the 1940s ===
General election 1945: Stroud
Party	Candidate	Votes	%	±%
Labour	Ben Parkin	22,495	40.8	+4.0
Conservative	Walter Perkins	21,546	39.0	−24.2
Liberal	Peter Cadbury	11,141	20.2	N/A
Majority		949	1.8	N/A
Turnout		55,182	72.6	+1.6
Registered electors		75,987		+40.4
Labour gain from Conservative		Swing	+14.1	

General Election 1939–40:

Another general election was required to take place before the end of 1940. The political parties had been making preparations for an election to take place from 1939 and by the end of this year, the following candidates had been selected;

- Conservative: Walter Perkins

=== Elections in the 1930s ===
General election 1935: Stroud
Party	Candidate	Votes	%	±%
Conservative	Walter Perkins	24,282	63.2	−8.2
Labour	Constance Borrett	14,133	36.8	+8.2
Majority		10,149	26.4	−16.6
Turnout		38,415	71.0	−5.5
Registered electors		54,140		+7.1
Conservative hold		Swing	−8.2	

General election 1931: Stroud
Party	Candidate	Votes	%	±%
Conservative	Walter Perkins	27,612	71.4	+21.9
Labour	F W Davies	11,039	28.6	+2.5
Majority		16,573	42.8	+27.8
Turnout		38,651	76.5	−5.1
Registered electors		50,534		+1.3
Conservative hold		Swing	+11.7	

1931 Stroud by-election
Party	Candidate	Votes	%	±%
Unionist	Walter Perkins	17,641	49.6	+5.1
Labour	John Maynard	10,688	30.0	+3.9
Liberal	Arthur Stanton	7,267	20.4	−9.1
Majority		6,953	19.6	+4.6
Turnout		35,596	71.4	−10.2
Registered electors		49,874		+2.3
Unionist hold		Swing	+6.5	

=== Elections in the 1920s ===
General election 1929: Stroud
Party	Candidate	Votes	%	±%
Unionist	Frank Nelson	17,700	44.5	−9.7
Liberal	Arthur Stanton	11,728	29.5	+8.9
Labour	F. E. White	10,384	26.1	+0.9
Majority		5,972	15.0	−14.0
Turnout		39,812	81.6	+2.7
Registered electors		48,776		+30.6
Unionist hold		Swing	+4.0	

General election 1924: Stroud
Party	Candidate	Votes	%	±%
Unionist	Frank Nelson	15,973	54.2	+7.4
Labour	Edith Picton-Turbervill	7,418	25.2	N/A
Liberal	Arthur Stanton	6,057	20.6	−32.6
Majority		8,555	29.0	N/A
Turnout		29,448	78.9	+0.7
Registered electors		37,336		+2.3
Unionist gain from Liberal		Swing	+16.8	

General election 1923: Stroud
Party	Candidate	Votes	%	±%
Liberal	Frederick Guest	15,179	53.2	+21.9
Unionist	Stanley Tubbs	13,355	46.8	−4.2
Majority		1,824	6.4	N/A
Turnout		28,534	78.2	−1.7
Registered electors		36,504		+1.1
Liberal gain from Unionist		Swing	+13.0	

General election 1922: Stroud
Party	Candidate	Votes	%	±%
Unionist	Stanley Tubbs	14,723	51.0	N/A
Liberal	Charles Allen	9,041	31.3	−28.6
Labour	Samuel Edward Walters	5,081	17.6	−22.5
Majority		5,682	19.7	−0.1
Turnout		28845	79.9	+18.6
Registered electors		36,094		+4.1
Unionist gain from Liberal				

== Elections 1832 to 1918 ==
=== Elections in the 1910s ===
Lister

General election 1918: Stroud
Party		Candidate	Votes	%	±%
C	Liberal	Ashton Lister	12,734	59.9	
	Labour	Charles Wye Kendall	8,522	40.1	New
Majority			4,212	19.8	
Turnout			21,256	61.3	
Registered electors			34,685		
	Liberal hold				
C indicates candidate endorsed by the coalition government.

George Hardy

General Election 1914–15:

Another General Election was required to take place before the end of 1915. The political parties had been making preparations for an election to take place and by July 1914, the following candidates had been selected:

- Liberal: George Hardy
- Unionist: Cecil Edwin Fitch

General election December 1910: Stroud
Party	Candidate	Votes	%	±%
Liberal	Charles Allen	5,051	51.0	−0.6
Conservative	Cecil Edwin Fitch	4,849	49.0	+0.6
Majority		202	2.0	−1.2
Turnout		9,900	90.1	−3.1
Registered electors		10,992		0.0
Liberal hold		Swing	−0.6	

General election January 1910: Stroud
Party	Candidate	Votes	%	±%
Liberal	Charles Allen	5,285	51.6	−4.5
Conservative	Arthur William Clifford	4,962	48.4	+4.5
Majority		323	3.2	−9.0
Turnout		10,247	93.2	+2.6
Registered electors		10,992		+3.5
Liberal hold		Swing	−4.6	

=== Elections in the 1900s ===
General election 1906: Stroud
Party	Candidate	Votes	%	±%
Liberal	Charles Allen	5,401	56.1	+4.4
Conservative	William Burton Stewart	4,221	43.9	−4.4
Majority		1,180	12.2	+8.8
Turnout		9,622	90.6	+4.0
Registered electors		10,620		+1.4
Liberal hold		Swing	+4.4	

C.P. Allen

General election 1900: Stroud
Party	Candidate	Votes	%	±%
Liberal	Charles Allen	4,692	51.7	+5.1
Conservative	Charles Cripps	4,379	48.3	−5.1
Majority		313	3.4	−3.4
Turnout		9,071	86.6	+3.0
Registered electors		10,474		−9.6
Liberal gain from Conservative		Swing	+5.1	

=== Elections in the 1890s ===
General election 1895: Stroud
Party	Candidate	Votes	%	±%
Conservative	Charles Cripps	5,175	53.4	+4.5
Liberal	Charles Allen	4,514	46.6	−4.5
Majority		661	6.8	N/A
Turnout		9,689	83.6	+2.1
Registered electors		11,588		+4.7
Conservative gain from Liberal		Swing	+4.5	

Brynmor Jones

General election 1892: Stroud
Party	Candidate	Votes	%	±%
Liberal	David Brynmor Jones	4,611	51.1	+5.3
Conservative	George Holloway	4,410	48.9	−5.3
Majority		201	2.2	N/A
Turnout		9,021	81.5	−0.8
Registered electors		11,069		+6.7
Liberal gain from Conservative		Swing	+5.3	

=== Elections in the 1880s ===
General election 1886: Stroud
Party	Candidate	Votes	%	±%
Conservative	George Holloway	4,620	54.2	+5.9
Liberal	Walter John Stanton	3,911	45.8	−5.9
Majority		709	8.4	N/A
Turnout		8,531	82.3	−4.3
Registered electors		10,371		
Conservative gain from Liberal		Swing	+5.9	

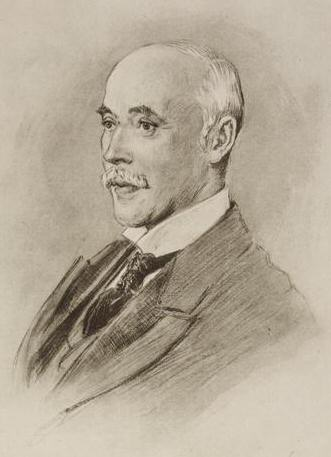
Henry Brand

General election 1885: Stroud
Party	Candidate	Votes	%	±%
Liberal	Henry Brand	4,646	51.7	−1.1
Conservative	George Holloway	4,333	48.3	+1.1
Majority		313	3.4	+1.1
Turnout		8,979	86.6	−5.2 (est)
Registered electors		10,371		
Liberal win (new seat)				

General election 1880: Stroud
Party	Candidate	Votes	%	±%
Liberal	Walter John Stanton	3,098	26.5	+0.6
Liberal	Henry Brand	3,081	26.3	+0.5
Conservative	George Holloway	2,810	24.0	+1.2
Conservative	John Dorington	2,722	23.2	−2.3
Majority		271	2.3	+2.0
Turnout		5,856 (est)	91.8 (est)	+0.7
Registered electors		6,376		
Liberal hold		Swing	−0.3	
Liberal hold		Swing	+1.4	

=== Elections in the 1870s ===
1875 Stroud by-election
Party	Candidate	Votes	%	±%
Liberal	Samuel Marling	2,783	51.9	+0.2
Conservative	William Keppel	2,577	48.1	−0.2
Majority		206	3.8	+3.5
Turnout		5,360	88.7	−2.4
Registered electors		6,046		
Liberal hold		Swing	+0.2	

- Caused by the previous by-election being declared void on petition.

July 1874 Stroud by-election
Party	Candidate	Votes	%	±%
Liberal	Henry Brand	2,695	50.8	−0.9
Conservative	James Thomas Stanton	2,613	49.2	+0.9
Majority		82	1.6	N/A
Turnout		5,308	89.3	−1.8
Registered electors		5,942		
Liberal gain from Conservative		Swing	−0.9	

- Caused by Dorington's election being declared void on petition, due to "bribery, treating, and undue influence".

May 1874 Stroud by-election
Party	Candidate	Votes	%	±%
Conservative	John Dorington	2,796	25.9	+0.4
Liberal	Alfred John Stanton	2,722	25.3	−0.6
Liberal	Henry Brand	2,677	24.8	−1.0
Conservative	George Holloway	2,582	24.0	+1.2
Majority		119	1.1	N/A
Majority		140	1.3	+1.0
Turnout		5,389 (est)	90.7 (est)	−0.4
Registered electors		5,942		
Conservative gain from Liberal		Swing	+0.7	
Liberal hold		Swing	−0.9	

- Caused by the election being declared void on petition on "account of treating, but the treating was not with knowledge of the candidates".

General election 1874: Stroud
Party	Candidate	Votes	%	±%
Liberal	Walter John Stanton	2,798	25.9	−10.0
Liberal	Sebastian Dickinson	2,794	25.8	−11.4
Conservative	John Dorington	2,763	25.5	+12.1
Conservative	George Holloway	2,467	22.8	+9.4
Majority		31	0.3	−8.8
Turnout		5,411 (est)	91.1 (est)	+3.3
Registered electors		5,942		
Liberal hold		Swing	−10.4	
Liberal hold		Swing	−11.1	

By-election, 8 Jan 1874: Stroud
Party	Candidate	Votes	%	±%
Conservative	John Dorington	2,817	53.7	+26.9
Liberal	Henry Allan	2,426	46.3	−26.8
Majority		391	7.4	N/A
Turnout		5,243	88.2	+0.4
Registered electors		5,942		
Conservative gain from Liberal		Swing	+26.8	

- Caused by Winterbotham's death.

=== Elections in the 1860s ===
General election 1868: Stroud
Party	Candidate	Votes	%	±%
Liberal	Sebastian Dickinson	2,907	37.2	N/A
Liberal	Henry Winterbotham	2,805	35.9	N/A
Conservative	John Dorington	2,096	26.8	N/A
Majority		709	9.1	−14.9
Turnout		4,952 (est)	87.8 (est)	+16.0
Registered electors		5,642		
Liberal hold				
Liberal hold				

By-election, 20 August 1867: Stroud
Party	Candidate	Votes	%	±%
Liberal	Henry Winterbotham	580	53.3	N/A
Conservative	John Dorington	508	46.7	New
Majority		72	6.6	−17.4
Turnout		1,088	80.2	+8.4
Registered electors		1,356		
Liberal hold				

- Caused by Scrope's resignation.

General election 1865: Stroud
Party	Candidate	Votes	%	±%
Liberal	Edward Horsman	687	41.4	N/A
Liberal	George Scrope	685	41.3	N/A
Liberal	Ashley Ponsonby	287	17.3	N/A
Majority		398	24.0	N/A
Turnout		973 (est)	71.8 (est)	N/A
Registered electors		1,356		
Liberal hold				
Liberal hold				

=== Elections in the 1850s ===
General election 1859: Stroud
Party	Candidate	Votes	%	±%
Liberal	Edward Horsman	Unopposed		
Liberal	George Scrope	Unopposed		
Registered electors		1,320		
Liberal hold				
Liberal hold				

General election 1857: Stroud
Party	Candidate	Votes	%	±%
Whig	Edward Horsman	Unopposed		
Whig	George Scrope	Unopposed		
Registered electors		1,287		
Whig hold				
Whig hold				

By-election, 6 March 1855
Party	Candidate	Votes	%	±%
Whig	Edward Horsman	Unopposed		
Whig hold				

- Caused by the appointment of Horsman as Chief Secretary to the Lord Lieutenant of Ireland

By-election, 28 June 1853
Party	Candidate	Votes	%	±%
Whig	Edward Horsman	Unopposed		
Whig hold				

- Caused by Reynolds-Moreton's elevation to the peerage, becoming 3rd Earl Ducie

General election 1852: Stroud
Party	Candidate	Votes	%	±%
Whig	George Scrope	565	29.8	−12.5
Whig	Henry Reynolds-Moreton	528	27.8	−16.2
Conservative	Samuel Baker	488	25.7	New
Radical	John Norton	316	16.7	+2.9
Majority		40	2.1	−26.4
Turnout		949 (est)	71.4 (est)	+11.2
Registered electors		1,328		
Whig hold		Swing	−7.0	
Whig hold		Swing	−8.8	

=== Elections in the 1840s ===
General election 1847: Stroud
Party	Candidate	Votes	%	±%
Whig	William Henry Stanton	563	44.0	+4.3
Whig	George Julius Poulett Scrope	541	42.3	+7.1
Radical	Marcus Mereweather Turner	176	13.8	N/A
Majority		365	28.5	+18.5
Turnout		728 (est)	60.2 (est)	−14.6
Registered electors		1,210		
Whig hold		Swing	N/A	
Whig hold		Swing	N/A	

General election 1841: Stroud
Party	Candidate	Votes	%	±%
Whig	William Henry Stanton	594	39.7	−0.9
Whig	George Julius Poulett Scrope	527	35.2	−6.4
Conservative	Sir William Lascelles Wraxall, 2nd Baronet	377	25.2	+7.5
Majority		150	10.0	−12.9
Turnout		916	74.8	+0.8
Registered electors		1,224		
Whig hold		Swing	−2.3	
Whig hold		Swing	−5.1	

- J Symons, formerly Editor of the Stroud Free Press, was a candidate but withdrew before the election took place.
- The Gloucester Journal described him as "A Chartist of Nailsworth by name Chapman who has issued his address couched in flaming terms worthy of the Northern Star (goes on to comment that he was a small publican and tailor".

=== Elections in the 1830s ===
General election 1837: Stroud
Party	Candidate	Votes	%	±%
Whig	George Julius Poulett Scrope	698	41.6	−7.6
Whig	John Russell	681	40.6	+0.4
Conservative	John Adams	297	17.7	New
Majority		384	22.9	−6.7
Turnout		991	74.0	+2.2
Registered electors		1,340		
Whig hold				
Whig hold				

By-election, 19 May 1835: Stroud
Party	Candidate	Votes	%
Whig	John Russell	Unopposed	
Registered electors			
Whig hold			

- Resignation of Fox

General election 1835: Stroud
Party	Candidate	Votes	%	±%
Whig	George Julius Poulett Scrope	866	49.2	+22.8
Whig	Charles Richard Fox	708	40.2	N/A
Radical	Jelinger Cookson Symons	187	10.6	N/A
Majority		521	29.6	+28.6
Turnout		937	71.8	−20.9
Registered electors		1,305		
Whig hold				
Whig hold				

By-election, 27 May 1833: Stroud
Party	Candidate	Votes	%
Whig	George Julius Poulett Scrope	Unopposed	
Whig hold			

- Resignation of Ricardo

General election 1832: Stroud
Party	Candidate	Votes	%
Whig	William Henry Hyett	985	46.2
Whig	David Ricardo	585	27.4
Whig	George Julius Poulett Scrope	562	26.4
Majority		23	1.0
Turnout		1,156	92.7
Registered electors		1,247	
Whig win (new seat)			
Whig win (new seat)			

== See also ==
- List of parliamentary constituencies in Gloucestershire

== Sources ==
Craig, F. W. S. (1983). British parliamentary election results 1918-1949 (3 ed.). Chichester: Parliamentary Research Services. ISBN 0-900178-06-X.
