= Stroud and Thornbury =

Parliamentary constituency in the United Kingdom, 1950–1955

- Former county constituency for the House of Commons
- County: Gloucestershire
- Major settlements: Stroud and Thornbury

1950–1955
- Seats: One
- Created from: Stroud and Thornbury
- Replaced by: Stroud and South Gloucestershire

Stroud and Thornbury was a county constituency represented in the House of Commons of the Parliament of the United Kingdom. It elected one Member of Parliament (MP) by the first past the post system of election.

The constituency was created for the 1950 general election and abolished for the 1955 general election.

== Boundaries ==
The Urban Districts of Nailsworth and Stroud, the Rural Districts of Dursley, Stroud, and Thornbury, and in the Rural District of Gloucester the civil parishes of Arlingham, Brookthorpe, Eastington, Elmore, Frampton-on-Severn, Fretherne with Saul, Frocester, Hardwicke, Harescombe, Haresfield, Longney, Moreton Valence, Quedgeley, Standish, Upton St Leonards, and Whitminster.

== Members of Parliament ==
Election	Member	Party
1950	Sir Walter Perkins	Conservative
1955	constituency abolished: see Stroud	

== Election results ==
General election 1951: Stroud and Thornbury
Party	Candidate	Votes	%	±%
Conservative	Walter Perkins	30,140	51.3	+7.8
Labour	Ben Parkin	28,558	48.7	+5.3
Majority		1,582	2.6	+2.5
Turnout		58,698	86.0	+0.6
Registered electors		68,287		+1.9
Conservative hold		Swing	+1.3	

General election 1950: Stroud and Thornbury
Party	Candidate	Votes	%	±%
Conservative	Walter Perkins	24,874	43.5	
Labour	Ben Parkin	24,846	43.4	
Liberal	Margaret MacAlpine	7,518	13.1	
Majority		28	0.1	
Turnout		57,238	85.4	
Registered electors		67,010		
Conservative win (new seat)				

== See also ==
- List of parliamentary constituencies in Gloucestershire
