= James Berry (surgeon) =

British surgeon

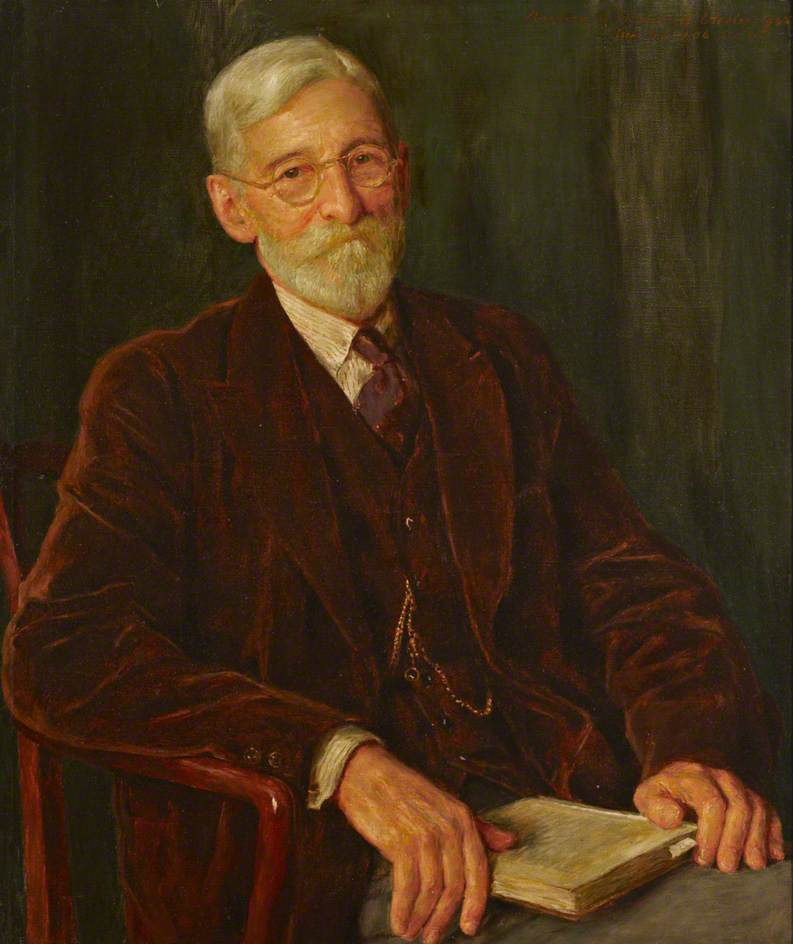
Sir James Berry by Herbert Arnould Olivier, 1942

Sir James Berry FRCS FSA (1860-17 March 1946) was a Canadian-born British surgeon.

Berry was born in Kingston, Canada West, to English solicitor Edward Berry of Croydon, London and was educated at Whitgift School, Croydon and St Bartholomew's Hospital. He then served as house surgeon at St Bartholomew's to Sir Thomas Smith, and was demonstrator of anatomy.

In 1885 he became surgeon to the Alexandra Hospital for Diseases of the Hip, in Queen Square but in 1891 was elected consulting surgeon at the Royal Free Hospital. There he established a reputation for surgery of cleft palates, a condition from which he himself suffered, and the treatment of goitre. During the First World War he and his wife Frances established six hospitals in Serbia for the treatment of wounded soldiers and refugees. He was with the Serbian army at Odessa in Russia from 1916 to 1917. For his efforts here, he was awarded the Order of the Star of Romania (4th class), Order of St Sava (3rd class), and Order of Saint Anna of Russia.

He was President of the Medical Society of London, 1921–22 and President of the Royal Society of Medicine, 1926–28. He was knighted in the 1925 Birthday Honours. He retired in 1927 and was elected consulting surgeon to the Royal Free Hospital.

In 1891, he married in Dr Frances May Dickinson (1857-1934), the daughter of Sebastian Dickinson, MP for Stroud. Frances, an anaesthetist, was a distinguished doctor in her own right. She studied at Bedford College, University of London and worked alongside James in a Red Cross hospital in Serbia in World War I. She later became anaesthetist at the Royal Free Hospital as well as Assistant Medical Officer of the London County Council, President of the Association of Registered Medical Women, and Honorary Secretary of the Anaesthesia Section of the Royal Society of Medicine.

After her death in 1934 he had married Mabel Ingram, a doctor. He died childless in 1946.

== Published works ==
- Goitre, its pathology, diagnosis and surgical treatment; Hunterian lectures, 1891. St Bart's Hosp J. 1898, 5, 109.
- The thyroid, in Sir Henry Butlin's Operative surgery of malignant diseases. 2nd ed. London, 1900.
- Diseases of the thyroid gland and their surgical treatment. London, 1901.
- A manual of surgical diagnosis. London, 1904.
- Hare-lip and cleft palate, with T P Legg. London, 1912.
- Surgery of the thyroid gland (Lettsomian lectures, Medical Society of London). Lancet, 1913, 1, 583, 668, 737.
- Clinical notes on malignant tumours of long bones. Clin J. 1914, 43, 465, 487. The story of a Red Cross unit in Serbia, with F M Berry and W L Blease. London, 1916.
- Fortified churches of southern Transylvania. Archaeologia, 1919.
- Fallen idols (annual oration). Trans Med Soc Lond. 1932, 55, 261.
- A Cromwellian Major-General, the career of Colonel James Berry 1610-1691, with Stephen G Lee. Oxford University Press, 1938.
