= May 1874 Stroud by-election =

UK parliamentary by-election

The 1874 Stroud by-election was fought on 15 May 1874. Caused by the election of Liberal MP, Sebastian Stewart Dickinson being declared void on petition on "account of treating, but the treating was not with knowledge of the candidates". One of the seats was retained by the Liberals, while the other seat was lost to the Conservatives.

May 1874 Stroud by-election
Party	Candidate	Votes	%	±%
Conservative	John Dorington	2,796	25.9	+0.4
Liberal	Alfred John Stanton	2,722	25.3	−0.6
Liberal	Henry Brand	2,677	24.8	−1.0
Conservative	George Holloway	2,582	24.0	+1.2
Majority		119	1.1	N/A
Majority		140	1.3	+1.0
Turnout		5,389 (est)	90.7 (est)	−0.4
Registered electors		5,942		
Conservative gain from Liberal		Swing	+0.7	
Liberal hold		Swing	-0.9	
