= Anthony Kershaw =

British politician (1915–2008)

Sir Anthony Kershaw

Chair of the Foreign Affairs Select Committee
- In office 3 May 1979 – 1 January 1987
- Succeeded by: David Howell

Parliamentary Under-Secretary of State for Defence
- In office 5 June 1973 – 8 January 1974
- Prime Minister: Edward Heath
- Preceded by: Antony Lambton

Parliamentary Under-Secretary of State for Foreign and Commonwealth Affairs
- In office 15 October 1970 – 5 June 1973
- Prime Minister: Edward Heath
- Preceded by: The Marquess of Lothian
- Succeeded by: Peter Blaker

Parliamentary Secretary to the Ministry of Public Building and Works
- In office 24 June 1970 – 15 October 1970
- Prime Minister: Edward Heath

Parliamentary Private Secretary to the Leader of the Opposition
- In office 1967–?
- Leader: Edward Heath

Member of Parliament for Stroud
- In office 26 May 1955 – 18 May 1987
- Preceded by: Constituency established
- Succeeded by: Roger Knapman

Personal details
- Born: John Anthony Kershaw; 14 December 1915 Cairo, Egypt
- Died: 29 April 2008 (aged 92) Didmarton, Gloucestershire, England
- Children: 4
- Awards: Military Cross; Deputy Lieutenant

Military service
- Allegiance: United Kingdom
- Branch/service: British Army
- Years of service: 1940–1958
- Rank: Lieutenant colonel

Sir John Anthony Kershaw MC (14 December 1915 – 29 April 2008) was a British Conservative Member of Parliament (MP) for 32 years, from 1955 to 1987. He served as a junior minister in the 1970s. He was also a barrister, World War II cavalry officer, amateur rugby player and company director.

== Early life and education ==
Kershaw was born in Cairo, the second son of Jack F. Kershaw—a judge at the Cairo Court of Appeal—and his wife, Anne, who hailed from Kentucky. He was educated at Eton College, where he played cricket. His father died when he was 13, and his elder brother, Overton, two years later. Kershaw read law at Balliol College, Oxford, where he befriended his contemporary Edward Heath. He became a barrister, and was called to the Bar at Inner Temple in 1939.

He married Barbara Edith Crookenden—daughter of solicitor Harry Crookenden—in 1939. They had two daughters and two sons named Carolyn, Harry, Cecilia and George.

== War service ==
At the beginning of World War II, Kershaw served with the Thames River police, then was commissioned second lieutenant in the 16th/5th Lancers on 15 June 1940. He was promoted temporary captain, and landed in North Africa in November 1942 in Operation Torch. He served with tanks, and was awarded the Military Cross (MC) for his actions north of the Kasserine Gap in Tunisia in 1943. On 21 February 1943 he was a brigade staff officer (GSO3) with 26th Armoured Brigade (which comprised his own regiment amongst others) and had command of the brigade command tank. The brigade commander, Brigadier Charles Dunphie, was commanding from a scout car whose radio broke down. Kershaw, despite heavy machine gun and artillery fire, repeatedly ran from his tank, to the scout car, and back, to take the brigadier's orders, which he then relayed over the tank's radio. The following day, a German counterattack was believed to be imminent. Kershaw volunteered to man his tank, which had been disabled, to bring additional fire to bear on the advancing forces; despite its vulnerability to artillery fire as it was in full view on a road.

Promoted temporary major, he landed in Normandy three days after D-Day (D+3) as brigade major (GSO1) of an armoured brigade and fought in northern France and Belgium, before becoming an instructor at the Staff College, Camberley. After the war, he transferred to the Inns of Court Regiment in the Territorial Army on 6 May 1948, reverting to his war substantive rank of captain. He transferred into the TA reserve of officers on 16 August 1949 and was granted the honorary rank of major. He returned to the active list, joining the Royal Gloucestershire Hussars as a captain once more, on 25 May 1951. He regained the rank of major on 13 March 1954, and was promoted to lieutenant-colonel on 6 April 1955, and commanded the regiment until he again transferred to the TA reserve of officers on 7 April 1958.

== Political career ==
Kershaw returned to the bar after the war. He also served as a member of the London County Council from 1946 to 1949, and as a councillor on the Westminster City Council from 1947 to 1948. He played rugby union for Harlequins.

Kershaw contested Gloucester in 1950 and 1951. He was elected as Member of Parliament (MP) for Stroud in 1955, remaining in that position until his retirement at the 1987 general election, with a substantially increased majority. He supported National Service in his maiden speech. He became private secretary to the Secretary of State for War, Antony Head, in 1956, and became Parliamentary Private Secretary (PPS) to Edward Heath in 1963, when Heath was Secretary of State for Industry, Trade and Regional Development and President of the Board of Trade. He was a member of the Executive of the 1922 Committee from 1964 to 1966, and resumed the position as Heath's PPS in 1967, when Heath was Leader of the Opposition. Kershaw represented the Conservatives at the Council of Europe and the Western European Union. After the Conservatives returned to power following the 1970 general election, Kershaw became a junior minister during the 1970–1974 Conservative government, first as Parliamentary Secretary in the Ministry of Public Building and Works (1970), then, after the death of Iain Macleod, as Parliamentary Under-Secretary of State at the Foreign and Commonwealth Office (1970–1973), and finally Parliamentary Under-Secretary at the Ministry of Defence with responsibility for the Royal Air Force (June 1973 – January 1974), replacing Lord Lambton who resigned after a sex scandal.

He was unwaveringly loyal to Heath's successor, Margaret Thatcher, but his political views (he supported abortion but opposed hanging; he also supported the European Union and electoral reform) barred him from further ministerial office. He served as chairman of the House of Commons Foreign Affairs Select committee from 1979 to 1987, and again on the 1922 Committee executive from 1983 to 1987. He was knighted in the 1981 New Year Honours, "[f]or political and public service".

In 1984, he was forwarded information received by Tam Dalyell relating to the sinking of the General Belgrano in the Falklands War, which showed that the full facts had not been released to the public. Kershaw sent the information to the Ministry of Defence, which identified the leak as originating with Clive Ponting, who was tried (but acquitted) for an offence under section 2 of the Official Secrets Act 1911.

Kershaw joined the National Committee for Electoral Reform in 1976, and served as a vice-chairman of the British Council from 1974 to 1987. He also continued his legal work, and was an adviser to British American Tobacco and the Association of British Marine Tools. Having kept wicket at Eton, he later played for the House of Commons cricket team.

He became Deputy Lieutenant of Gloucestershire in 1989, and served as Vice-Lord Lieutenant from 1990 to 1993.

== Personal life ==
He hunted with the Beaufort Hunt and the Berkeley Hunt, and also enjoyed shooting, stalking and gardening. He died in Didmarton in Gloucestershire. He was survived by his wife and their four children.

Parliament of the United Kingdom
New constituency	Member of Parliament for Stroud; 1955–1987	Succeeded by Roger Knapman
Political offices
Preceded by	Parliamentary Private Secretary to the Leader of the Opposition; 1967–?	Succeeded by
Preceded by	Parliamentary Secretary to the Ministry of Public Building and Works; 1970	Succeeded by
Preceded by The Marquess of Lothian	Parliamentary Under-Secretary of State for Foreign and Commonwealth Affairs; 1970–1973	Succeeded by Peter Blaker
Preceded by Antony Lambton	Parliamentary Under-Secretary of State for Defence; 1973–1974	Succeeded by
