= 1869 Liskeard by-election =

UK parliamentary by-election

The 1869 Liskeard by-election was fought on 11 May 1869. The by-election was fought due to the death of the incumbent MP of the Liberal Party, Sir Arthur Buller. It was won by a Liberal candidate Edward Horsman, who was opposed by a more advanced Liberal, Francis Lycett, due to Horsman's perceived moderation.

By-Election 11 May 1869: Liskeard
Party	Candidate	Votes	%	±%
Liberal	Rt Hon. Edward Horsman	368	56.36	N/A
Liberal	Sir Francis Lycett	285	43.64	N/A
Majority		83	12.72	N/A
Turnout		653	74.12	N/A
Registered electors		881		
Liberal hold		Swing	N/A	
