= Sebastian Dickinson =

English politician

Sebastian Stewart Dickinson (25 March 1815 – 23 August 1878) was an English Liberal Party politician who sat in the House of Commons from 1868 to 1874.

Dickinson was the son of Major General Thomas Dickinson, of the Honourable East India Company's Engineers, and of Hurstpierpoint. He was educated at Eton College and was called to the bar at the Inner Temple in June 1839. He was chairman of Board of Guardians at Stroud, and chairman of 2nd Court of Quarter Sessions for Gloucestershire. He was a J.P. for Gloucestershire and a captain in the 5th Gloucestershire Rifle Volunteers. He was also a Fellow of the Heraldry Society and a Fellow of the Royal Geographical Society.

At the 1868 general election Dickinson was elected as a member of parliament (MP) for Stroud. He was re-elected at the 1874 general election, but in April 1874 his election was declared void.

He was Chairman of Barnwood House Hospital, Gloucester from 1862 to 1878. This was a significant private mental asylum which opened in Barnwood in 1860, closing eventually in 1968. The first chairman was William Henry Hyett, of Painswick House, Gloucestershire; in 1856, Dickinson married his daughter, Frances Stephana Hyett. Their son was Willoughby Dickinson, 1st Baron Dickinson; daughter Frances May, an anaesthetist, was the first wife of surgeon Sir James Berry. He died at the age of 63.

Parliament of the United Kingdom
Preceded by Edward Horsman; Henry Winterbotham	Member of Parliament for Stroud; 1868 – 1874; With: Henry Winterbotham to Jan 1874; John Dorington Jan 1874 – Feb 1874; Walter John Stanton Feb 1874 – May 1874	Succeeded by Alfred John Stanton; John Dorington
