= January 1874 Stroud by-election =

UK parliamentary by-election

The 1874 Stroud by-election was fought on 6 January 1874. The by-election was fought due to the death of the incumbent MP of the Liberal Party, Henry Selfe Page Winterbotham. It was won by the Conservative candidate John Edward Dorington.
