= Alfred John Stanton =

British Member of Parliament (1825–1906)

Alfred John Stanton (20 September 1825 – 11 December 1906) was a British Liberal Member of Parliament representing Stroud who was elected to the House of Commons of the United Kingdom on 18 May 1874.

His father, William Henry Stanton, was also MP for Stroud, from 1841 to 1852.

Parliament of the United Kingdom
Preceded by Walter John Stanton; Sebastian Dickinson	Member of Parliament for Stroud; 1874 – 1880; With: John Dorington to Jul 1874; Henry Brand Jul 1874 – 1875; Samuel Marling 1875 – 1880	Succeeded by Walter John Stanton; Henry Brand
