= 1875 Stroud by-election =

UK Parliamentary by-election

The 1875 Stroud by-election was fought on 19 February 1875. The by-election was fought due to the election of the incumbent Liberal MP, Henry Brand being voided on petition. It was won by the Liberal candidate Samuel Marling.

1875 Stroud by-election
Party	Candidate	Votes	%	±%
Liberal	Samuel Marling	2,783	51.9	+0.2
Conservative	William Keppel	2,577	48.1	−0.2
Majority		206	3.8	+3.5
Turnout		5,360	88.7	−2.4
Registered electors		6,046		
Liberal hold		Swing	+0.2	
