= John Maynard (civil servant) =

British civil servant and political activist

Sir Herbert John Maynard, KCIE, CSI (12 July 1865 – 6 December 1943) was a British administrator in India, who was also prominent in the Fabian Society and wrote about Russia.

Maynard was educated at the Merchant Taylors' School and St John's College, Oxford, where he won the Stanhope essay prize in 1883 and gained a First Class in 1886. From 1883, he served with the Indian Civil Service, becoming a deputy commissioner in 1889, then councillor to the Raja of Mandi from 1890. When in the early nineties the Government of India offered a special inducement to their officers to learn the Russian language and qualify as interpreters, Maynard took advantage of it, and in 1894 he spent some of his furlough in Russia; he went to Moscow, lived with a Russian family, and for a period of six to eight months took lessons in the language, becoming very proficient. In the spring of 1895 he visited Russian Turkestan, going as far as Tashkent and returning to Moscow in time for the coronation of Nicholas II. After his return to India he kept up his knowledge of the language and read widely in Russian literature; his letters reflect a vivid interest in the life of the people and their politics, especially the peasants. From 1896, he was the judicial secretary to the government of the Punjab from 1896 to 1899, then he served as commissioner of excise from 1903, commissioner of Multan from 1906, of Rawalpindi from 1911, and as financial commissioner of the Punjab from 1913. He retired in 1927, having held a number of high posts with distinction.

He revisited Russia in 1933, accompanied by his wife; they journeyed to Leningrad, Moscow, the Volga, Stalingrad, Rostov, the Georgian Highway, Tiflis, Batum, the Black Sea, Crimea, Kharkov, and Kiev, then home via Warsaw and Berlin. They returned in 1935, traveling to the Caucasus and Ukraine; during this visit he concentrated on the study of collectivization of farm land and its organization. On his return he wrote an account, Collective Farming in the U.S.S.R., which was published in July 1936, as Monograph No. 11 of the School of Slavonic Studies. His last visit to the U.S.S.R. was in 1937 when he went to Odessa from Istanbul; he was interested in the influence of Byzantine art on Russian art, but the Moscow trials were on and foreigners were treated with suspicion, so he was unable to meet any of the people he wanted to see. He got very little material out of the journey, and left disappointed.

His main work was his study of the Russian peasant, for which he had amassed an enormous amount of material which he wanted to publish as one volume. However, he was advised that the first part, carrying the story up to the February Revolution of 1917, should be published separately as it was more consecutive and easy to read. So it was issued by Victor Gollancz in 1940 under the title Russia in Flux; as the entire edition was destroyed in the blitz it was reissued in 1941. Then in October 1942 the remainder of the work was published as The Russian Peasant and other Studies. The book was successful and further printings were issued in December 1942 and July 1943.

Maynard was a supporter of the British Labour Party. He stood unsuccessfully in King's Lynn at the 1929 United Kingdom general election, at the 1931 Stroud by-election, and in Fulham East at the 1931 United Kingdom general election. He also served on the executive of the Fabian Society.

In 1920, Maynard was made a Knight Commander of the Order of the Indian Empire.
