= William Henry Stanton (MP) =

British politician (1790–1870)

William Henry Stanton (6 October 1790 – 24 March 1870) was a British Liberal Party politician.

== Parliamentary career ==
At the 1841 general election, Stanton was elected as one of the two Members of Parliament (MPs) for the parliamentary borough of Stroud in Gloucestershire. He was returned to the House of Commons again in 1847, but did not seek re-election at the 1852 general election.

His son, Alfred John Stanton, was also MP for Stroud, from 1874 to 1880.

Parliament of the United Kingdom
Preceded by John Russell; George Poulett Scrope	Member of Parliament for Stroud; 1841 – 1852; With: George Poulett Scrope	Succeeded by Lord Moreton; George Poulett Scrope
