= Roger Knapman =

UK Independence Party politician (born 1944)

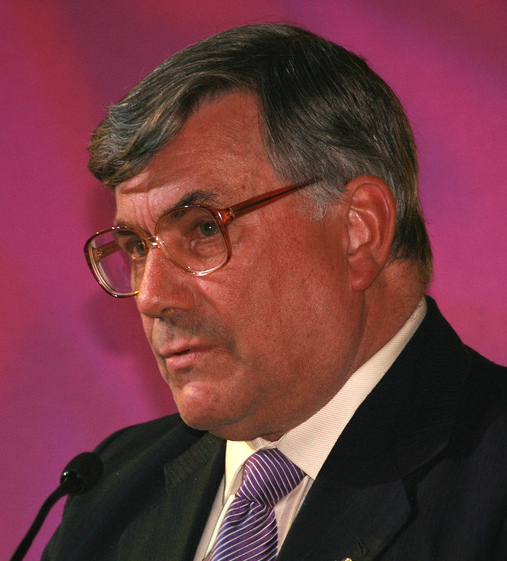

Leader of the UK Independence Party
- In office 5 October 2002 – 27 September 2006
- Deputy: Mike Nattrass
- Chairman: David Lott; Petrina Holdsworth; David Campbell Bannerman
- Preceded by: Jeffrey Titford
- Succeeded by: Nigel Farage

Lord Commissioner of the Treasury
- In office 23 July 1996 – 1 May 1997
- Prime Minister: John Major
- Preceded by: Simon Burns
- Succeeded by: Bob Ainsworth

Member of the European Parliament for South West England & Gibraltar
- In office 10 July 2004 – 4 June 2009
- Preceded by: The Earl of Stockton
- Succeeded by: The Earl of Dartmouth

Member of Parliament for Stroud
- In office 11 June 1987 – 8 April 1997
- Preceded by: Sir Anthony Kershaw
- Succeeded by: David Drew

Personal details
- Born: 20 February 1944 (age 82) Crediton, Devon, England
- Party: UK Independence Party (Since 1997); Conservative (before 1997)
- Spouse: Carolyn Knapman
- Children: 2
- Education: Royal Agricultural College

Roger Maurice Knapman (born 20 February 1944) is a British politician who served as a Conservative MP before becoming Leader of the UK Independence Party (UKIP).

== Early life ==
The son of Harry Arthur Blackmore Knapman, a farmer, and Joan Margot née Densham, Roger Knapman was educated at Allhallows School, Lyme Regis, and the Royal Agricultural College, Cirencester. Before entering politics, he was a Chartered Surveyor and partner with West Country, a firm of livestock auctioneers and surveyors, 1963–77. He was then a Chartered Surveyor in his own right 1978–85.

== Parliamentary career ==
As a member of the Conservative Party, Knapman was elected MP for Stroud in 1987, and was Vice-Chairman of the Conservative European Affairs Committee. Between 1990 and 1992, he served as parliamentary private secretary to the armed forces minister, Archie Hamilton. In this capacity he joined the Conservative Monday Club's Foreign Affairs Committee Delegation to the Croatian Government in October 1991 to observe their war of independence against Serbia. He resigned from his government position in order to oppose the Maastricht Treaty. He successfully defended his seat in the 1992 general election. In 1995 he became a government whip. In 1997, however, he lost his seat to the Labour candidate, David Drew.

== UKIP ==
Shortly afterwards, Knapman left the Conservative party to join UKIP. He stood as their candidate in the 2001 general election for North Devon, coming fourth yet narrowly retaining his deposit.

From 2000, he was UKIP's political advisor, and in 2002 he was elected unopposed as party leader. In 2004 he was elected a Member of the European Parliament for the South West England constituency. As leader of the only British party in the European Parliament to vote against the expansion of the EU in 2004 (and publicly opposing immigration), there was some amusement in May 2006 when it was revealed that he had employed a team of Polish builders to renovate his Grade II listed home in Devon, claiming there were no suitable local workers – a claim denied by local builders.

He contested Totnes at the 2005 general election, coming 4th with 7.7% of the vote.

In 2006, he announced that he had no intention of seeking re-election as party leader; the leadership contest was won in September of that year by Nigel Farage MEP. Knapman was the only leader of UKIP to have succeeded in completing a full four-year term until Farage did so in 2014 after returning to the role in 2010.

Parliament of the United Kingdom
Preceded by Anthony Kershaw	Member of Parliament for Stroud; 1987–1997	Succeeded by David Drew
Party political offices
Preceded by Jeffrey Titford	Leader of the United Kingdom Independence Party; 2002–2006	Succeeded by Nigel Farage
