= Ashton Lister =

British Liberal Member of Parliament

R. A. Lister's election address to the voters of Tewkesbury in 1910

Sir Robert Ashton Lister CBE JP (4 February 1845 – 6 December 1929) was a British Liberal Member of Parliament and founder of R A Lister and Company in Dursley, Gloucestershire, in 1867. He was elected to the House of Commons of the United Kingdom on 14 December 1918 to represent Stroud.

He had previously contested the Tewkesbury seat three times without success. He was knighted in 1911 and created a Commander of the Order of the British Empire in the 1919 New Year Honours.

He went to the Paris Exhibition of 1867 with an exhibit of his father's firm's machinery. In the same year he started business for himself, founding R A Lister and Company to produce agricultural machinery. The principal products were cream separators and other dairy and sheep shearing machinery, petrol, oil and gas engines, tractors, tractor ploughs and automatic electric lighting plants.

Lister travelled extensively to promote his company's products. He was a pioneer of business in Western Canada by taking the first cream separator in that region over the plains of Alberta. In 1900 he had many interviews with Dominion Ministers including Wilfrid Laurier and was asked to give evidence before the Tariff Revising Committee.

Lister also devoted much time to public work. He served on Gloucestershire County Council from the time of its formation in 1889 until 1928.

Lady Frances Lister died in September 1911 and Sir Ashton was survived by three sons.

== Sources ==
- Obituary of Sir Ashton Lister, The Times 7 December 1929, copied here
- Hansard 1803–2005: contributions in Parliament by Robert Lister

Parliament of the United Kingdom
Preceded by Charles Allen	Member of Parliament for Stroud; 1918–1922	Succeeded by Stanley Tubbs
Political offices
