= Charles Anderson Lane Dunphie =

British Army general (1902–1999)

Major general Sir Charles Dunphie Kt CB DSO
- Born: 20 April 1902; London
- Died: 8 January 1999 (aged 96); Wincanton, Somerset
- Spouse: Eileen Campbell (m. 1931)
- Military career
- Allegiance: United Kingdom
- Branch: British Army
- Service years: 1921–1948
- Rank: Major general
- Commands: 26th Armoured Brigade
- Conflicts: World War II
- Awards: Knight Bachelor; Companion of the Order of the Bath; Distinguished Service Order; Silver Star
- Other work: Chairman of Vickers

Sir Charles Anderson Lane Dunphie Kt CB DSO (20 April 1902 – 8 January 1999) was a senior officer of the British Army.

== Early life and education ==
He was born in London on 20 April 1902, the elder son of businessman Sir Alfred Dunphie. As he wanted to join the Royal Navy he attended Royal Naval College, Osborne and then Royal Naval College, Dartmouth. After failing to meet the navy's eyesight requirements, he was transferred to the Royal Military Academy, Woolwich and was commissioned into the Royal Artillery in 1921.

== Military career ==
=== Prewar ===
He served in British India throughout the 1920s. Following his return to England he attended Staff College, Camberley in 1935 and then was assigned to a Heavy Artillery Regiment in Gibraltar for a year. In 1939 he became General staff officer 2 in the 1st Armoured Division.

=== World War II ===
He served with the 1st Armoured Division in the Battle of France and was mentioned in despatches before the remnants of the division were evacuated from Cherbourg in June 1940.

He commanded the 20th Armoured Brigade from May to August 1942 and was subsequently appointed commander of the 26th Armoured Brigade. He led the brigade in a delaying action in the Battle of Kasserine Pass, inflicting serious losses on the advancing Axis forces.

He was then appointed as Assistant Chief of Staff to the United States Army II Corps, serving first under Major general George Patton and then Major general Omar Bradley, becoming friends of both men.

He was recalled to England to serve as Deputy Director, Royal Armoured Corps. In 1945, he became Director, General Fighting Vehicles at the Ministry of Supply.

He retired from the army in 1948.

== Later life ==
Following his army career he joined Vickers, became managing director in 1956 and chairman in 1962. He also served as a director of Westminster Bank and the Royal Exchange Assurance until his retirement in 1967.

He died on 8 January 1999 in Wincanton, Somerset.
