= 1931 Stroud by-election =

UK Parliamentary by-election

The 1931 Stroud by-election was held on 21 May 1931. The by-election was held due to the resignation of the incumbent Conservative MP, Sir Frank Nelson. It was won by the Conservative candidate Walter Perkins.

== Candidates ==
The Liberal Party ran 56 year-old Arthur William Stanton of Field Place, Stroud. Stanton was a solicitor. He had been their candidate at both the 1924 and 1929 general elections. Previously he had contested Gloucester for the Liberal Party at both the 1922 and 1923 general elections.

== Result ==
Stroud by-election, 1931
Party	Candidate	Votes	%	±%
Conservative	Walter Perkins	17,641	49.6	+5.1
Labour	John Maynard	10,688	30.0	+3.9
Liberal	Arthur William Stanton	7,267	20.4	−9.1
Majority		6,953	19.6	+4.6
Turnout		35,596	71.4	−10.2
Conservative hold		Swing	+6.5	

== Aftermath ==
Following the formation of the National Government, the Liberals chose not to run a candidate at the 1931 general election. Stanton did run again, at the 1935 general election in Chippenham, again without success. In 1937 he was appointed High Sheriff of Gloucestershire.
