= Henry Winterbotham =

English lawyer and politician

Henry Selfe Page Winterbotham (2 March 1837 – 13 December 1873) was an English lawyer and Liberal Party politician who sat in the House of Commons from 1867 to 1873.

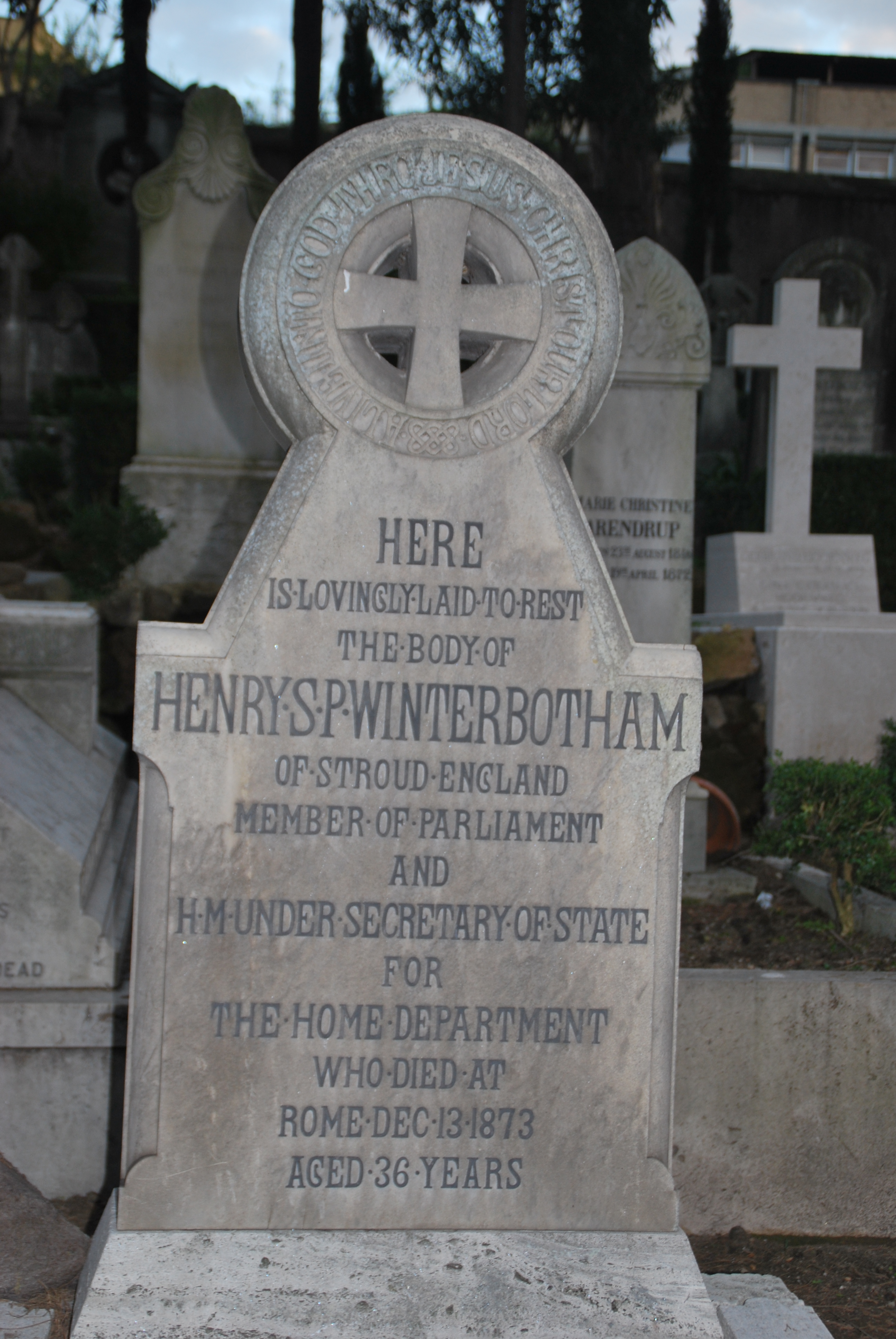
Cimitero acattolico Rome

Winterbotham was the son of Lindsey Winterbotham, a banker, of Stroud and his wife Sarah Anne Selfe Page. He was educated at Amersham School, Buckinghamshire, and at University College, London, graduating with honours, BA in 1856, and LLB in 1859. He was a Hume Scholar in Jurisprudence in 1858, and a Hume Scholar in Political Economy and University Law Scholar in 1859. In 1860, he was elected Fellow of his college and called to the bar at Lincoln's Inn. He was in practice at the chancery bar and as a conveyancer.

Winterbotham was elected Member of Parliament (MP) for Stroud at a by-election on 20 August 1867 and held the seat until his death in 1873. In 1870 he was appointed Under-Secretary of State for the Home Department, an office he held until his death.

Winterbotham died in Rome in December 1873, aged 36, allegedly from overwork. His brother Arthur Brend Winterbotham was also a Member of Parliament.

Parliament of the United Kingdom
Preceded by George Poulett Scrope; Edward Horsman	Member of Parliament for Stroud; 1867–1873; With: Edward Horsman to 1868; Sebastian Dickinson from 1868	Succeeded by John Dorington; Sebastian Dickinson
Political offices
Preceded by George Shaw-Lefevre	Under-Secretary of State for the Home Department; 1871–1873	Succeeded by Sir Henry Selwin-Ibbetson, Bt
