= July 1874 Stroud by-election =

UK parliamentary by-election

The 1874 Stroud by-election was fought on 24 July 1874, due to the election of the incumbent Conservative MP, John Edward Dorington being declared void on petition, due to "bribery, treating, and undue influence".

It was won by the Liberal candidate Henry Brand.

July 1874 Stroud by-election
Party	Candidate	Votes	%	±%
Liberal	Henry Brand	2,695	50.8	−0.9
Conservative	James Thomas Stanton	2,613	49.2	+0.9
Majority		82	1.6	N/A
Turnout		5,308	89.3	−1.8
Registered electors		5,942		
Liberal gain from Conservative		Swing	-0.9	
