= Walter Perkins (Stroud MP) =

Member of Parliament for Stroud
- In office 21 May 1931 – 15 June 1945
- Preceded by: Sir Frank Nelson
- Succeeded by: Ben Parkin

Member of Parliament for Stroud and Thornbury
- In office 23 February 1950 – 6 May 1955
- Preceded by: Constituency established
- Succeeded by: Constituency abolished

Personal details
- Born: Walter Robert Dempster Perkins; 3 June 1903
- Died: 8 December 1988 (aged 85)
- Party: Conservative
- Occupation: Engineer

Sir Walter Robert Dempster Perkins, also known as Robert Perkins, (3 June 1903 – 8 December 1988) was a Conservative Party politician in England.

Perkins was educated at Eton College and Trinity College, Cambridge, and before entering Parliament was a trained engineer. He was elected as Member of Parliament (MP) for Stroud in Gloucestershire at a by-election in May 1931, following the resignation of the Conservative MP Sir Frank Nelson. He was re-elected at the general election in October 1931 and again in 1935.

However, he was defeated at the 1945 general election by the Labour Party candidate, Ben Parkin. At the 1950 general election he and Parkin both contested the new Stroud and Thornbury constituency, and Perkins took the seat with a majority of only 28 votes. The two men fought the seat again in 1951, when Perkins held the seat with a more comfortable majority of 1,582.

Perkins retired from the House of Commons at the 1955 general election, having been knighted in February 1954.

Parliament of the United Kingdom
Preceded by Frank Nelson	Member of Parliament for Stroud; 1931 – 1945	Succeeded by Ben Parkin
New constituency	Member of Parliament for Stroud & Thornbury; 1950 – 1955	Constituency abolished
