= John Dorington =

British politician (1832–1911)

Dorington in 1895.

Sir John Edward Dorington, 1st Baronet, PC, DL (24 July 1832 – 5 April 1911) was a British Conservative politician.

== Life ==
The son of John E. Dorington of Lypiatt Park, Stroud, he was educated at Windlesham House School, Eton College and Trinity College, Cambridge.

Dorington was returned to parliament for Stroud in a by-election in early January 1874. He lost his seat almost immediately in the general election commencing in late January 1874. However, the election was declared void in April 1874 and Dorington was returned again in the subsequent May by-election. He again lost his seat when this election was declared void in July 1874. He has created a baronet, of Lypiatt Park in the parish of Stroud in the county of Gloucester, on 12 February 1886. In July of the same year he was once again returned to parliament, this time for Tewkesbury, and held the seat until his own death in 1911.

In December 1886 he was appointed a Deputy Lieutenant of Gloucestershire. He was appointed a Privy Councillor on 11 August 1902, following an announcement of the King's intention to make this appointment in the 1902 Coronation Honours list published in June that year.

Escutcheon of the Dorington baronets of Lypiatt Park

Dorington continued to represent Tewkesbury in parliament until 1906. His death in April 1911, aged 78. The baronetcy died with him.

Parliament of the United Kingdom
Preceded by Henry Winterbotham; Sebastian Dickinson	Member of Parliament for Stroud; January–February 1874; With: Sebastian Dickinson	Succeeded by Sebastian Dickinson; Walter John Stanton
Preceded by Sebastian Dickinson; Walter John Stanton	Member of Parliament for Stroud; May–July 1874; With: Alfred John Stanton	Succeeded by Alfred John Stanton; Henry Brand
Preceded by John Yorke	Member of Parliament for Tewkesbury; 1886–1906	Succeeded by Michael Hicks Beach
Baronetage of the United Kingdom
New creation	Baronet (of Lypiatt Park); 1886–1911	Extinct
Preceded by Leighton baronets	Dorington baronets of Lypiatt Park; 12 February 1886	Succeeded by Walker baronets
