= Henry Brand, 2nd Viscount Hampden =

Governor of New South Wales (1841–1906)

The Right Honourable The Viscount Hampden GCMG
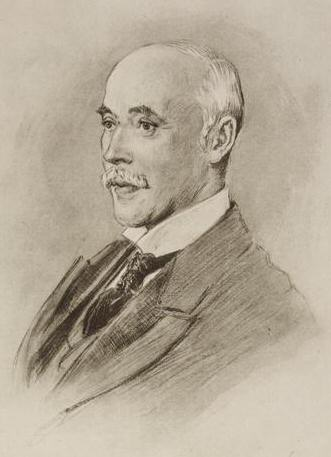
- Engraved portrait of Brand drawn by Percy F. Spence

19th Governor of New South Wales
- In office 21 November 1895 – 5 March 1899
- Monarch: Victoria
- Preceded by: Sir Robert Duff
- Succeeded by: The Earl Beauchamp

Personal details
- Born: 2 May 1841 Devonport, Devon, England
- Died: 22 November 1906 (aged 65) London, England

Henry Robert Brand, 2nd Viscount Hampden, GCMG (2 May 1841 – 22 November 1906) was Governor of New South Wales from 1895 to 1899.

== Background ==
Hampden was born in Devonport on 2 May 1841, the son of Henry Brand, 1st Viscount Hampden. He succeeded his father as second Viscount and twenty-fourth Baron Dacre on 14 March 1892.

== Career ==
Hampden was Member of Parliament (MP) for Hertfordshire 1868–1873 and for Stroud 1880–1886. He stood unsuccessfully as the Liberal Unionist candidate for Cardiff in 1886.

He arrived in Sydney, Australia on 21 November 1895, and served an uneventful term as Governor of New South Wales. He resigned his post before the conclusion of his intended term effective from 1 March 1899, citing private interests. He left Sydney by train on 5 March 1899, joining the steamer Oruba in Melbourne the following day. He was the penultimate Governor of New South Wales before the Federation of Australia.

== Family ==
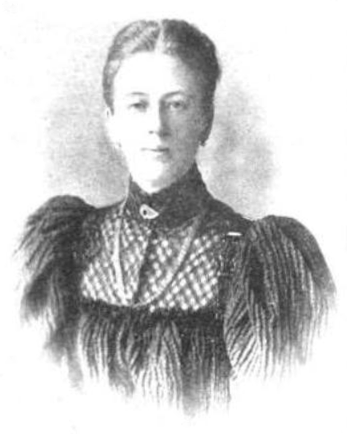
Susan Henrietta Cavendish

Lord Hampden married, firstly, on 21 January 1864 Victoria Alexandrina Leopoldine Van de Weyer, daughter of the Belgian ambassador Sylvain Van de Weyer, but she died the following year on 20 July 1865. Lord Hampden married, secondly, Susan Henrietta Cavendish (1846–1909), daughter of Lord George Cavendish and Louisa Lascelles, on 14 April 1868. They had the following children:

- Thomas Brand, 3rd Viscount Hampden (1869–1958) married Katharine Mary Montagu-Douglas-Scott (1875–1951), daughter of William Henry Walter Montagu-Douglas-Scott and Louisa Jane Hamilton, on 29 April 1899; they had eight children.
- Sir Hubert George Brand (1870–1955) married Norah Conyngham Greene (d. 1924), daughter of Sir William Conyngham Greene and Lady Lily Stopford on 28 January 1914; they had two daughters: Elizabeth Norah Brand (b. 1915) and Mary Kathleen Brand (b. 1921).
- Richard Brand (1871–1880) died at age eight.
- Margaret Brand (1873–1948) married Algernon Francis Holford Ferguson (1867–1943) on 21 April 1897 at St Andrew's Cathedral, Sydney; had five children: Victor John Ferguson (b. 1898), Andrew Henry Ferguson (b. 1899), George Algernon Holford Ferguson (b. 1905), Margaret Susan Ferguson (b. 1906), and Jane Charlotte Ferguson (b. 1912). Through her son Andrew, she is the great-grandmother of Sarah Ferguson.
- Alice Brand (1877–1945)
- Dorothy Louisa Brand (1878–1958) married Percy Henry Guy Feilden (1870–1944) on 11 November 1902; they had three children: Randle Guy Feilden (1904–1981), Cecil Henry Feilden (b. 1907) and Dorothy Priscilla Feilden (b. 1909).
- Robert Henry Brand, 1st Baron Brand married Phyllis Langhorne (d. 20 January 1937) on 9 June 1917; they had three children: Virginia Brand (b. 1918), Dinah Brand (b. 1920), and Robert James Brand (b. 1923).
- Roger Brand (1880–1945) married Muriel Hectorina Lilian Montgomery (d. 1988) on 21 November 1913; they had one child: Patricia Helen Winifred Brand (b. 1926).
- Geoffrey Brand (1885–1899) died at age 13.

== Legacy ==
Hampden Bridge in Kangaroo Valley, NSW is named for him. He died in London on 22 November 1906.

Parliament of the United Kingdom
Preceded by Henry Surtees; Henry Cowper; Abel Smith, junior	Member of Parliament for Hertfordshire; 1868–1874; With: Henry Cowper; Abel Smith, junior	Succeeded by Frederick Halsey; Henry Cowper; Abel Smith, junior
Preceded by John Dorington; Alfred John Stanton	Member of Parliament for Stroud; July 1874 – 1875; With: Alfred John Stanton	Succeeded by Samuel Marling; Alfred John Stanton
Preceded by Alfred John Stanton; Samuel Marling	Member of Parliament for Stroud; 1880–1886; With: Walter John Stanton 1880–1885	Succeeded by George Holloway
Government offices
Preceded by Sir Robert Duff	Governor of New South Wales; 1895–1899	Succeeded by The Earl Beauchamp
Military offices
Preceded by Sir John Miller Adye	Surveyor-General of the Ordnance; 1882–1885	Succeeded by Guy Dawnay
Peerage of the United Kingdom
Preceded by Henry Brand	Viscount Hampden; 2nd creation 1892–1906	Succeeded by Thomas Brand
