= David Ricardo (the younger) =

British Liberal Member of Parliament

David Ricardo (1803 – 17 May 1864) was a British Liberal Member of Parliament.

== Early life ==
He was the son of David Ricardo, the MP and economist. He was educated at Charterhouse School (1812–1815) and Trinity College, Cambridge.

In 1823 his father died and he inherited Gatcombe Park, Gloucestershire, his father's country house.

== Career ==
He was appointed High Sheriff of Gloucestershire for 1830–31. and elected MP for Stroud in 1832 but "took the Chiltern Hundreds" in 1833.

== Personal life ==
He married Catherine, the daughter of William Thomas St Quintin, of Scampston Hall, Yorkshire, and had two sons and a daughter.

He was succeeded at Gatcombe by his second son, Henry David, his first son having died in infancy.
