= William Henry Hyett =

William Henry Hyett (2 September 1795 – 10 March 1877) was a British Whig Member of Parliament representing Stroud who was elected to the House of Commons of the United Kingdom on 13 December 1832.

Originally William Henry Adams, he was the son of the Rev. Henry Cay Adams and his wife Frances Marston. He changed his surname in 1813, after being left the estates of Benjamin Hyett. He resided at Painswick House, in Gloucestershire. He was elected a Fellow of the Royal Society on 29 February 1844.

He was instrumental in the founding of Gloucester's first Mental Asylum at Horton Road in Gloucester and subsequently the transfer of the private section of this hospital to Barnwood, establishing Barnwood House Hospital there in 1860. He was its first chairman (1858-1862).

== Family ==
Hyett – on October 25, 1821, in Church, in Hempstead in Gloucestershire – married Ann Jane Biscoe (1802–1885).
