= Stanley Tubbs =

Sir Stanley William Tubbs, 1st Baronet (22 March 1871 – 11 December 1941) was an industrialist, British Conservative Party politician, and benefactor. He was educated at Highgate School, and as a young man in the 1890s joined his father Henry Thomas Tubbs (1831–1917) in business at Tubbs Lewis & Co., a London elastic manufacturer which had expanded by acquiring several textile mills along the Little Avon River in Gloucestershire since 1870.

By 1900, he had taken over general management. He purchased Ellerncroft - a house in Wotton-under-Edge with a view over the river valley - from which he could establish each morning that work was underway by seeing smoke rising from the chimneys of the mills. Following his father's death in 1917, he became Governing Director of the company. He had a reputation as a strict employer, but provided regular social events for his workforce, such as an annual feast and concert known locally as a "Tubbs do".

Stanley Tubbs sat as the Member of Parliament (MP) for Stroud between November 1922 and December 1923, where he is recorded as speaking six times in Hansard. Despite his victory in the 1922 election, he lost his seat to the Liberal candidate the following year when Stanley Baldwin unsuccessfully attempted to gain a popular mandate after taking over as prime minister. He was created a Baronet, of Wotton-under-Edge in the County of Gloucester, in 1929. His coat of arms was inscribed Per deum et industriam obtinui (roughly translated from Latin, "What I have is from God and hard work"). He also served as High Sheriff of Gloucestershire in 1931. He sold the business interests in London around this time, concentrating on his Gloucestershire operations.

Tubbs died in December 1941, aged 70, and the baronetcy became extinct. At this time, over 90% of company contracts for elasticated fabric were with the military and government to supply the Second World War. New Mill, still visible today from his former home, was renamed New Mills when it became the global headquarters of Renishaw plc.

Parliament of the United Kingdom
Preceded by Sir Ashton Lister	Member of Parliament for Stroud; 1922–1923	Succeeded by Freddie Guest
Baronetage of the United Kingdom
New creation	Baronet (of Wotton-under-Edge); 1929–1941	Extinct
