= Frank Nelson (British politician) =

British intelligence officer (1883–1966)

Air Commodore Sir Frank Nelson KCMG
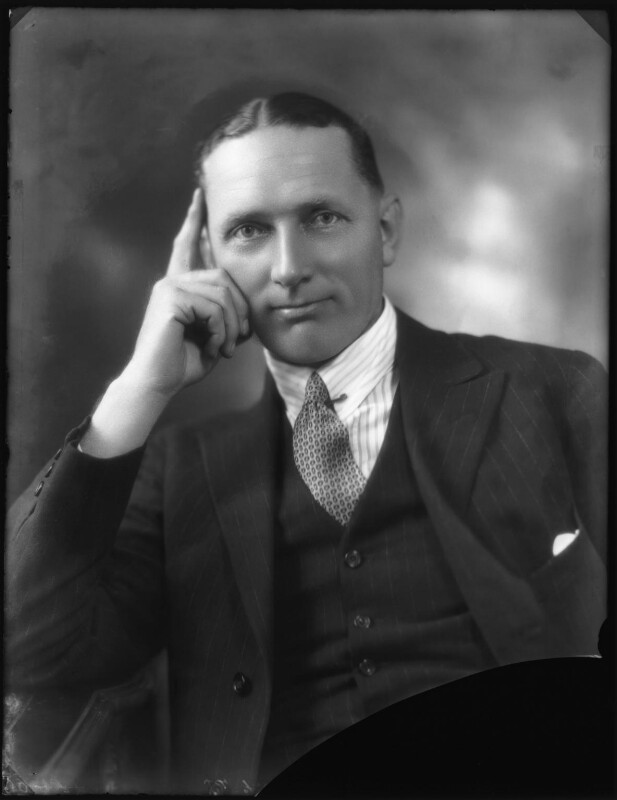
- Nelson in 1924
- Born: 5 August 1883
- Died: 11 August 1966 (aged 83)

Sir Frank Nelson KCMG (5 August 1883 – 11 August 1966) was a British civil servant, intelligence officer and politician.

== Life ==
Nelson was born at Bentham, near Brockworth, Gloucestershire, to Henry Ellis Hay Nelson and Catherine Haviland. He attended Bedford School and Neuenheim College, Heidelberg. After leaving school he travelled to India with the firm of Symons, Barlow and Co, eventually becoming a senior partner.

=== First World War and political career ===
During the First World War he served as an officer with the Bombay Light Horse. In 1922 he was appointed chairman of the Bombay Chamber of Commerce, and was made President of the Associated Chambers of Commerce of India and Ceylon in 1923.

Nelson served on the legislative council of Bombay from 1922 to 1924. He received a knighthood in 1924 and moved back to England, where he was elected Member of Parliament for Stroud at the 1924 United Kingdom general election. He was reelected in 1929 and resigned his seat in May 1931.

=== Second World War and the SOE ===
At the outbreak of the Second World War he was the Consul to Basel, working in intelligence, but as Germany invaded France in 1940, he was driven by Richard Arnold-Baker, an officer in the Secret Intelligence Service (MI6), to the mouth of the Gironde where the Nariva took them back to London so that he could take over the Special Operations Executive or SOE. He was appointed as its chief by order of the War Office.

Nelson, despite the government's objections, urged the war ministry to allow the SOE to support resistance groups in Europe.

== Personal life ==
He wore himself out establishing the organisation, and retired in 1942 due to ill health. He had married in 1911 Jean, daughter of Colonel Patrick Montgomerie; they had one son. She died in 1952 and he then married Dorothy Moira Carling. He died in Oxford on 11 August 1966. His second wife survived him.

Parliament of the United Kingdom
Preceded by Freddie Guest	Member of Parliament for Stroud; 1924 – 1931	Succeeded by Walter Perkins
