= Charles Allen (Stroud MP) =

Wales international rugby union footballer & British politician

Charles Peter Allen
- Allen in c.1910
- Born: Charles Peter Allen; 2 December 1861 Prestwich, England
- Died: 18 September 1930 (aged 68) London, England
- School: Rugby School
- University: University College, Oxford

Rugby union career
- Position: Back
Amateur team(s)
Years	Team	Apps	(Points)
- Oxford University RFC
–	Bangor RFC		
–	Manchester		
International career
Years	Team	Apps	(Points)
1884	Wales	2	(0)

Major Charles Peter Allen, PC (2 December 1861 – 18 September 1930) was an English Liberal politician who represented Stroud from 1900 to 1918. His professional career was as a solicitor and newspaper journalist. He served his country during World War I, as a major in the Gloucestershire Regiment, and as a sportsman played international rugby for Wales.

== Personal history ==
Charles Peter Allen was born in 1861 in Prestwich, Lancashire to Peter Allen, the manager of the Manchester Guardian and part owner of the Manchester Evening News. A younger brother was the Liberal politician Arthur Acland Allen. In 1865 the family moved to Beaumaris on the Isle of Anglesey in Wales, when they rented a property. The family purchased a house in the town in 1873. Allen was educated at Rugby School, before matriculating to Oxford University. On leaving university he was articled to a firm of Manchester solicitors, and qualified as a barrister, though by 1887 he had changed careers and became a journalist for the Manchester Guardian. He was assigned as a foreign correspondent and was sent to Russia, Bulgaria and Turkey. While in Constantinople he met Evelina Barker and the two were married in the city in 1890, before returning to live in Beaumaris. They had five children, four daughters and a son.

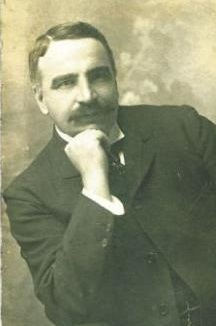
Charles Peter Allen MP, circa 1905

In 1900 he became Member of Parliament for Stroud, and he and his family moved to the area. While an MP, Allen was made a Privy Councillor, and was appointed a deputy lieutenant of Gloucestershire in 1911. He retained his position as MP until 1918. Allen had been a member of the 5th Battalion, Gloucestershire Regiment in the Territorial Force prior to the outbreak of war, and at the age of 53 he became a full-time soldier, helping to raise the 2/5th Gloucesters. Posted to France as a captain, he became a Town Major, dealing with troop movements. At the end of his military career, Allen had reached the rank of major. In 1922 he ran again for the Parliamentary seat of Stroud, but was beaten. He died at his London home in 1930.

== Rugby career ==
Allen first came to note as a rugby player when he was selected for Oxford University RFC, though he had also represented Rugby School as a youth. Allen played in three Varsity Matches against Cambridge University, winning three sporting 'Blues' from 1881 to 1883. In 1884, Allen was selected to play for Wales in the opening match of the Home Nations Championship against his birth country, England. Under the captaincy of Charlie Newman, Wales lost by a goal to a goal and two tries, though it was Allen who scored the only Welsh try, the first points the Welsh team had ever scored against the English. Allen was reselected for the next game of the tournament, in a home game to Scotland. Wales lost the game, and Allen was replaced for the final game by Cardiff's William Norton.

=== International matches played ===
Wales

- England 1884
- Scotland 1884

== Bibliography ==
- Capt A.F. Barnes, The Story of the 2/5th Battalion Gloucestershire Regiment 1914–1918, Gloucester: Crypt House Press 1930/Uckfield: Naval & Military, 2003, ISBN 978-1-84342-758-2.
- Godwin, Terry (1984). The International Rugby Championship 1883-1983. London: Willows Books. ISBN 0-00-218060-X.
- Griffiths, John (1987). The Phoenix Book of International Rugby Records. London: Phoenix House. ISBN 0-460-07003-7.
- Smith, David; Williams, Gareth (1980). Fields of Praise: The Official History of The Welsh Rugby Union. Cardiff: University of Wales Press. ISBN 0-7083-0766-3.

Parliament of the United Kingdom
Preceded by Charles Cripps	Member of Parliament for Stroud; 1900 – 1918	Succeeded by Sir Robert Ashton Lister
