= Samuel Marling =

British businessman and politician (1810–1883)

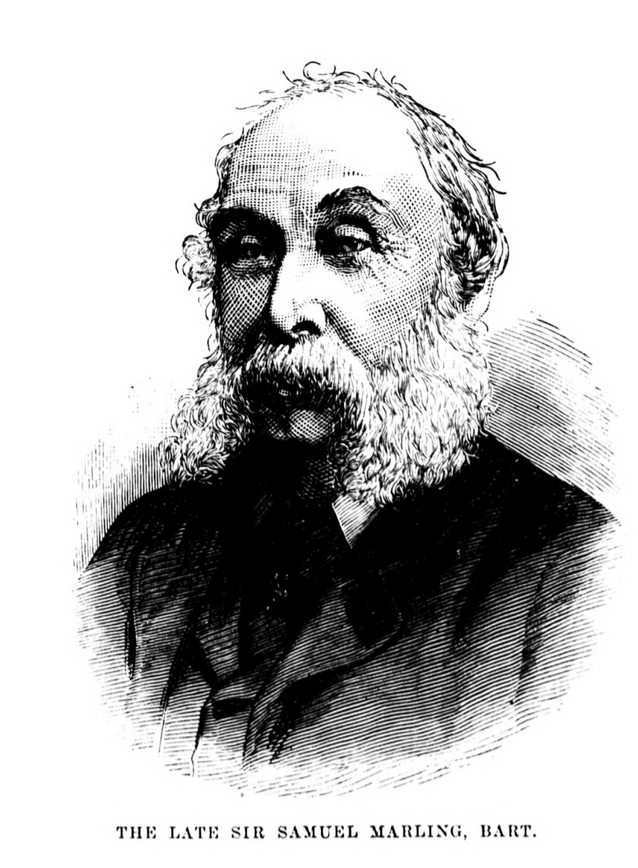
Samuel Marling

Sir Samuel Stephens Marling, 1st Baronet (10 April 1810 – 22 October 1883) was a British cloth manufacturer and Liberal Party politician. He was particularly associated with the village of Selsley, Gloucestershire.

== Biography ==
Marling in 1850 purchased what became for a century the Marling family estate at Stanley Park, Selsley. His descendants lived there until the estate was broken up in the early 1950s. The house is now converted into flats. In 1851, Marling purchased a 30 feet tall granite column at the Great Exhibition and had it transported to his estate where it was erected in the grounds. The granite column (which still exists) had been manufactured at the Cheesewring Quarry near Liskeard in Cornwall and carried by horse-drawn cart from Liskeard to Plymouth and thence by railway to London. As well as a being a successful businessman Marling was a noted philanthropist. In 1865 he established Selsley Church of England School, in 1862 he commissioned All Saints, the village church for Selsley which is located adjacent to Stanley Park, and later he was one of those responsible for the founding of Marling School, Stroud, in 1887, which was named after him due to the fact that he contributed £10,000 to the cause. He was also involved in politics and sat as Member of Parliament for Gloucestershire West from 1868 to 1874 and for Stroud from 1875 to 1880. In 1882 he was created a Baronet, of Stanley Park and Sedbury Park in the County of Gloucester. He died the next year, aged 73, and was succeeded by his son Sir William Henry Marling.

Parliament of the United Kingdom
Preceded by Edward Arthur Somerset; Nigel Kingscote	Member of Parliament for Gloucestershire West; 1868–1874; With: Nigel Kingscote	Succeeded by Hon. Randal Plunkett; Nigel Kingscote
Preceded by Henry Brand; Alfred John Stanton	Member of Parliament for Stroud; 1875–1880; With: Alfred John Stanton	Succeeded by Walter John Stanton; Henry Brand
Baronetage of the United Kingdom
New creation	Baronet (of Stanley Park and Sedbury Park); 1882–1883	Succeeded by William Henry Marling
