= George Holloway (politician) =

British politician (1825–1892)

George Holloway (1825 – 20 August 1892) was a British Conservative Member of Parliament representing Stroud who was elected to the House of Commons of the United Kingdom on 10 July 1886.

A clothing manufacturer, he was once the largest employer in Stroud. George with his brother Henry arrived in Stroud in 1849 and, in conjunction with Mathew Crowe, ran a clothing wholesale manufacturing business at 60/61 High Street, Stroud Glos – the business later moved to Threadneedle Street where the new, revolutionary steam-powered sewing machine was introduced. The business continued to prosper with branches in London, Liverpool and Bristol and in 1920, a very well fitted new factory was built at Brickrow in Stroud. George was regarded as a great benefactor to the town.

He was a J.P., and the man who brought sewing machines and ready-to-wear clothing to England. The Original Holloway Friendly Society Limited was founded in 1875 by George Holloway and was the first to offer disability insurance in the UK.

He was an agriculturalist with a 1,000-acre (400 ha) farm at Temple Guiting in North Gloucestershire, he gave generously to Stroud and the local Hospital, School of Art, the Church and the Library.

== Book ==
In his book Civilisation, Taxation and Representation Or Man's Social Position, Fiscal Responsibility, and Political Rights, Defined in Accordance with Nature (1864) he states, "It is one of the fixed laws of nature that the civilisation resulting from accumulating wealth is an inheritance common to all.: everyone shares it!" He explains that if wealth is land, it must be cultivated, merchandise be distributed, machinery worked and money invested, – in mines, bridges and railways.

In an effort to put his theory into practice especially for the good of the working man, he established the Mid-Gloucestershire working men's Benefit society, which is now The Original Holloway Society with branches nationwide. By paying a suggested seven old pence (2.5p) per week, members could ensure sickness benefit of at least five shillings (25p) a week and a lump sum on retirement at 65. His agricultural interests led to the formation of the Cottage Building Society, whereby a tenant could buy his £150 six bedroom cottage by paying monthly instalments of £8 10s. the payments decreasing each year.

== His Death ==
He died on 20 August 1892 aged 67 years and was buried in Stroud Cemetery on 25 August. He had been Member of Parliament for Stroud from 1886. His estate according to his will amounted to £158,000, after relatively modest distributions the bulk of his estate was placed in trust for his grandson George Arthur Augustus Matthews

== Statue ==
His statue stands in the town of Stroud and was completed in 1894 by T R Essex.
