= Lawrence Turner =

British politician

- Born: Henry Frederic Lawrence Turner; 30 December 1908 poss. Goring-on-Thames
- Died: 17 December 1977 (aged 68); Goring-on-Thames, Oxfordshire
- Education: Radley College, University of Reading and Exeter College, Oxford
- Occupation: Politician

Henry Frederic Lawrence Turner (30 December 1908 – 17 December 1977) was a British Conservative Party politician. As an officer in the Royal Artillery during the Second World War, he survived three years as a prisoner of war of the Japanese; he passed his captivity by lecturing on politics. After the war ended he moved into politics and was elected as Member of Parliament (MP) for Oxford. Although generally moderate in politics, his support for British intervention in Suez led him to resign the Conservative Party whip. He lived an extravagant lifestyle far beyond his means, which brought his career to a premature end and led to bankruptcy.

== Family ==
Turner's family were from Goring-on-Thames in Oxfordshire; he was the grandson of the author George Grossmith. He was sent to Radley College for his education, and then to the University of Reading and to Exeter College of the University of Oxford. He went to work in the family paint and varnish business, of which he later became managing director.

== Prisoner of war ==
After the Second World War broke out, in 1940 Turner enlisted in the Royal Artillery as a gunner, equivalent to a private. He served in Thailand, and was commissioned as an officer, but was captured by Japanese forces in early 1942 and held as a prisoner of war. The Japanese forced him to work on the Burma Road; Turner gave lectures on politics to other prisoners of war during his captivity. He weighed only 7 stone (44.5 kg) on his return.

== Post-war politics ==
Turner had intended to rejoin the family business but found that his uncle who had run it had died and that the only job offered to him was on unacceptable terms. Instead he became managing director of a trust company. Turner's family home in London was in Lancaster Gate, in Paddington. When the sitting Labour Member of Parliament for Paddington North announced his resignation, Turner was adopted as Conservative Party candidate for the byelection on 2 November 1946.

Turner appealed to the centre, believing that the ex-service men would switch to the Conservatives. He used the slogan "Turner for Freedom – or More Hard Labour", and put out a poster with the punning headline "Turner gain, Paddington". The result of the byelection was a Labour win by 2,917 votes, reduced from 6,545 in the previous general election. He was again adopted as candidate for the division in the 1950 general election, at which there were five candidates; The Times noted the "exemplary courtesy" between Turner and Labour candidate William J. Field. Turner worked some of the compact estates of the division very hard, although his religious belief led him to do no work on Sundays or on Shrove Tuesday and Ash Wednesday. Turner was again defeated, by 3,790 votes.

== Oxford byelection ==
In 1949 Turner bought a home at Ballinger in Buckinghamshire. The next year he rejoined the family paint company as chairman and joint managing director. In August 1950, the sitting Conservative MP for Oxford Quintin Hogg succeeded to the Viscountcy of Hailsham leaving a vacancy. Turner had good connections to Oxfordshire politics through his father, who had been chairman of South Oxfordshire Conservative Association for many years. From a field of 40–50 applicants, the local association chose Turner to fight the byelection.

Facing a straight fight with Labour candidate Kersland Lewis, Turner highlighted the issues of housing, the cost of living, defence and leadership, and claimed the support of a number of Conservative trade union shop stewards. Turner described the campaign as "all very respectable" and said that he had dealt with political issues only in his campaign; he had made 10 outdoor speeches every day including at factories.

== Parliament ==
Turner won the byelection, increasing the Conservative majority from 3,606 to 7,198. In his maiden speech, he spoke of the need for better supply of metals to the factories of his constituency. Later that year, Turner spoke on behalf of fellow former prisoners of war in support of a motion calling for compensation. He declared that he was lucky to survive, had never seen a bandage issued by the Japanese, and that prisoners had never received any Red Cross supplies.

== Support for industry ==
A pledge to "do all in our power to re-establish world peace" helped Turner to re-election in the 1951 general election with a majority of 6,940, Turner concentrated on industrial issues. He was particularly concerned with the export trade, arguing that industry suffered from continual interference by Government departments which did not affect Britain's competitors. In June 1954 he presented a petition from 1,140 undergraduates at Oxford University which called for abolition of the Hydrogen bomb and more effective moves towards disarmament.

== Christ Church Meadow ==
Turner's majority increased to 7,778 in the 1955 general election which coincided with a major controversy over roads schemes in Oxford. A new bypass road was planned to go across Christ Church meadow, and many local people opposed building on the unspoilt area. Turner supported the building of new roads, pointing out that the City Council was not aiming to destroy "what has been a pride and joy for so many centuries", but instead to divert traffic from the city centre.

In November 1955, Turner led a revolt against the budget proposal to increase the rate of Purchase Tax. He argued that the way to reduce the cost of living was for the Government to "reduce and eventually abolish all artificial taxation, of which Purchase Tax seems to me to be the most artificial of all". Turner deliberately abstained from voting rather than support the government.

== Suez Group ==
Turner supported the invasion of Suez and was not pleased when the military action was halted. He abstained in a vote approving the policy of intervention in Egypt in December 1956, and was outraged when the Government decided to withdraw from Suez. He was one of eight Conservative MPs who decided on 13 May 1957 to resign the Conservative whip in protest. The group abstained rather than support the Government on a censure motion moved by the Opposition a few days later. Turner received a vote of confidence from the Oxford Conservative Association for his action, although the Association's agent resigned soon after, citing "internal difficulties in the association".

He again abstained on a motion supporting the Government's handling of the economic situation in July 1957. In April 1958, Turner joined with two of his fellow Independent Conservatives to table a motion to reject the Distribution of Industry (Industrial Finance) Bill, which allowed the Government to give grants and loans to industry in areas of high unemployment; Turner's motion argued that the Bill placed the burden of reducing unemployment on the taxpayer, when the unemployment was a result of market conditions or deliberate Government policy.

== Cyprus ==
Turner was concerned also with the situation of Cyprus and in February 1958 declared that he would rejoin the Parliamentary Conservative Party if he got an undertaking that the Government would not weaken their attitude there. By June 1958, Turner and the remaining Independent Conservatives declared that they now agreed with the Government's foreign policy, and the five wrote to ask to be readmitted to the Conservative whip. After seeing Edward Heath, his application was approved.

== W.S. Gilbert copyright ==
However, Turner had already announced on 21 May that he would not seek re-election, explaining that it was on medical advice. In his last months in Parliament, he presented a petition signed by almost 500,000 people calling for special action to preserve the copyright of W. S. Gilbert's words for all time (they were due to run out in 1961). The petition had been organised by one of his constituents. Turner pointed out that his grandfather George Grossmith was one of the original Savoyards. The Government rejected Turner's request.

== Financial difficulties ==
Two years after leaving Parliament, Turner's extravagant lifestyle caught up with him. He had spent more on expenses while being a Member of Parliament than he had received in salary, which he put down to the "great deal of entertaining" he had to do in connection with the university. He had had to borrow a great deal from his bank, and his decision to stand down from Parliament was actually prompted by financial difficulties: in 1958 his affairs were placed in the hands of accountants and a committee of creditors. He was declared bankrupt, and disclosed liabilities of £6,956 compared with assets of £662. The bankruptcy hearing referred discreetly to "marital difficulties" which had also affected him; in 1966 Turner's wife, whom he had married in 1938, obtained a decree nisi of divorce against him on grounds of his desertion.

== Later life ==
In order to pay off his bankruptcy, Turner worked as an information officer with the Central Office of Information from 1961 to 1964. He was later general manager of Amalgamated Developers Ltd. In 1971, when the Suez rebel group reunited, Turner described himself as "living in obscurity and poverty in a shared room in Notting Hill".

Parliament of the United Kingdom
Preceded by Hon. Quintin Hogg	Member of Parliament for Oxford; 1950 – 1959	Succeeded by Hon. Montague Woodhouse
