= Paddington North =

Parliamentary constituency in the United Kingdom, 1885–1974

- Former borough constituency for the House of Commons

1885–1974
- Seats: One
- Created from: Marylebone
- Replaced by: Paddington

Paddington North was a borough constituency in the Metropolitan Borough of Paddington, in London which returned one Member of Parliament (MP) to the House of Commons of the Parliament of the United Kingdom, elected by the first past the post voting system. It was created in 1885 and abolished for the February 1974 general election.

It was a compact and mixed residential area which included some grand mansion blocks of flats, large runs of typical London terraced houses, and some areas of working-class housing. The constituency moved slowly down the social scale during its existence and the construction of large amounts of social housing following the Second World War made what had been a Conservative-inclined marginal seat into a reasonably safe Labour one. The area has a history of multiple ethnicity, French Huguenots settled in the village of Paddington in the eighteenth century, and in subsequent generations there were arrivals of Greek, Jewish, and Asian groups. Arab communities later became established along Edgware Road, recently there are as many south Asians as white English residents and many other ethnicities, Paddington is considered a neighbourhood of Westminster UK in northwest of London UK.

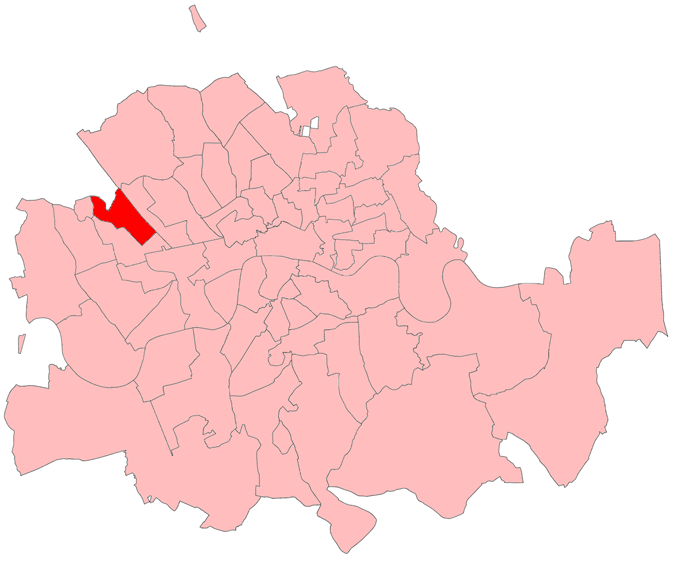
Paddington North in London 1885-1918

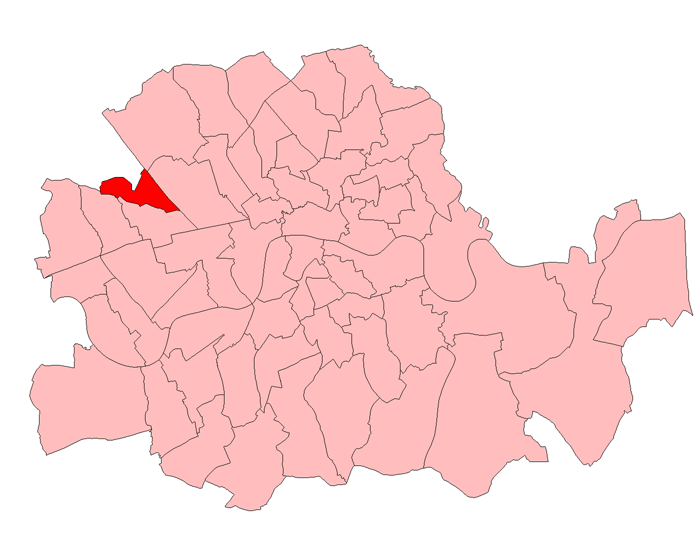
Paddington North in London 1918-1950

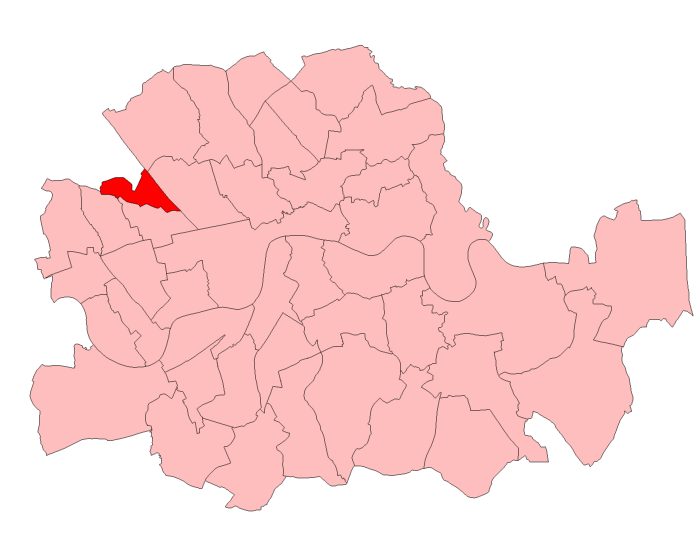
Paddington North in London 1950-1974

== Boundaries ==
The constituency was originally made up by the northern part of Paddington Parish. In the Redistribution of Seats Act 1885 it was defined as the number 2 ward of the Parish. Although Paddington had four wards, they had been drawn up thirty years before, and the number 2 ward had, by the mid-1880s, the majority of the electorate of the parish.

In the boundary changes in 1918, the constituency was refashioned as the northern part of the Metropolitan Borough of Paddington. The Borough had incorporated an area formerly included in a detached part of Chelsea parish at Kensal Town, and further population expansion made the north of the Borough even more densely packed, so a shift of the boundary was required. In the end, it was decided to include the whole of the Harrow Road, Queen's Park and Maida Vale wards of Paddington, together with part of the Church ward north of the Harrow Road and Little Venice canal basin.

In the boundary changes of 1948, the constituency's boundaries did not change, but the Church ward, which had been divided along the same line as the previous Parliamentary boundary with the part in Paddington North was renamed as the Town ward.

== Constituency profile ==
In contrast to the southern division of Paddington, the area was almost entirely residential. When first drawn up in 1885, the development of Maida Vale had not yet been completed and parts remained agricultural fields.

Up to 1918 the constituency included Paddington railway station and the Paddington canal basin, together with St Mary's Hospital. The south-east of the constituency included some Edgware Road frontage which included The Metropolitan Theatre music hall, a famous entertainment centre which was open for almost all of the time that the constituency was in existence. Between the Harrow Road and the canals of Little Venice was a densely packed area developed in the 1840s around the older St. Mary's Church and its churchyard. This area included Paddington Green and some homes and was the origin of the settlement of Paddington.

North of the canal and stretching up Maida Vale itself were situated large detached houses with gardens. At the start of the constituency's existence most were occupied by a single family, but as time went on the families took in lodgers and eventually split their homes into flats. Along Maida Vale, the 1930s saw the building of new mansion blocks, a type of housing that already predominated along Elgin Avenue and some of the other streets from the time they were first built (typically, the first decade of the twentieth century).

The constituency descended the social scale as one travelled to the west, with the houses becoming smaller and more cheaply built; Shirland Road was the approximate boundary of the two zones. Between the canal and the Harrow Road above Little Venice was an area around Westbourne Square (actually triangular) which quickly became slumland, although this was not typical of the area north of the canal. Much of this area was lost to Paddington South in 1918. Further up Harrow Road, the homes were typical of London terraces. One unusual feature was J. Welford's dairies, built on the corner of Shirland Road and Elgin Avenue in the 1880s and one of the most distinctive buildings of the area.

Following the boundary revisions of 1918, the constituency included the area of Queen's Park ward of Paddington Borough Council which had previously been a detached part of Chelsea. This area was developed from the 1870s explicitly as housing for the working class, by the Artizans, Labourers, and General Dwellings Company. They built modestly sized two storey homes which were rented out to the skilled working-class, many of whom were railway employees at Paddington station and its associated goods yard.

=== Changes and redevelopment ===
With the area being encircled by London, there came to be an economic motive for demolishing some of the existing low-density housing and rebuilding at higher densities for the working class. In 1937 the Church Commissioners built Dibden House containing some 200 flats for social rents at the top of Maida Vale. Following the Second World War there was a great deal of development of large social housing in the constituency. The first large development was John Aird Court and Fleming Court, built by the Labour-controlled Paddington Borough Council adjacent to the Harrow Road by Paddington Green in 1948.

The largest redevelopment took place along Maida Vale itself and was undertaken by the London County Council from 1959 to 1964. The area was rebuilt as an estate of mid-rise and high-rise flats (three 21-storey tower blocks were built north of Elgin Avenue). At the same time, the Church Commissioners also built the Stuart Tower on the corner of Maida Vale and Sutherland Avenue for private ownership. Further north along Carlton Vale the LCC built low rise flats. The southern end of the constituency saw a great deal of demolition in order to build the Marylebone flyover and rebuild the Harrow Road.

The 1960s saw the GLC redevelop the area around the junction of Elgin Avenue with Harrow Road with two 20-storey tower blocks. It decided to experiment with a new construction method called 'Indulex' with these two blocks and two others to be built in the London Borough of Tower Hamlets. The blocks consisted of a steel frame clad in glass-reinforced polyester.

In 1966, 13.1% of the constituency was born in the New Commonwealth.

== Political history ==
=== 1885 ===
In preparation for the 1885 general election, the creation of a new division in North West London which was potentially winnable by either the Conservatives or the Liberals excited some interest. The Conservatives were the first to select, and did so without difficulty. Lionel Louis Cohen was in his early-fifties and a leading light in the City of London Conservative Association; he was also President of the Jewish Board of Guardians. Although he was a resident of Marylebone, Cohen's wife came from Paddington. Cohen had the benefit of speeches from Lord Randolph Churchill who had been selected for Paddington South.

The North Paddington Liberal Council did encounter difficulty in selecting a candidate. They sent out invitations to several likely candidates to speak to a public meeting: Henry Gladstone, younger son of Liberal Leader William Ewart Gladstone, accepted, as did Thomas Chatfeild Clarke, John Westlake QC, and Rev. William Sharman. However, Eugene Collins, whose constituency of Kinsale was being abolished, refused to participate in a contested selection. The council eventually selected none of these: William Digby, a writer, ended up contesting the seat. Digby was a strong advocate of greater power for Indian natives.

At the start of the election, it appeared that things were not going well for the Conservatives. A public meeting in support of Lionel Cohen heard a derisive mention made of Joseph Chamberlain's promise of "three acres and a cow" for the working-class, and some cheered Chamberlain wildly. When the meeting concluded the chairman put a motion of confidence in their candidate, but on hearing that few present supported it, did not ask for people to show their opposition: the crowd demanded it and voted strongly against Cohen. On Monday 7 November 1885, a 2,000-strong crowd of working men gathered in Harrow Road to march to a meeting which denounced Cohen for supporting protectionism, although Cohen had declared his support for free trade in his election address.

At the end of the campaign, an issue was made in the Jewish Chronicle of Cohen's support for the Marquess of Salisbury, who had opposed the removal of legal disabilities affecting Jews in the 1850s. Cohen insisted that his activities in the Jewish community were not political and denounced attempts to "pit one section of Jews against another"; later the Marquess of Salisbury was himself moved to write to condemn the attempt to drag in a speech he had made nearly thirty years before. Digby received the support of the local branch of the Amalgamated Society of Railway Servants at a meeting held on Praed Street next to Paddington station.

As polling day approached, the Conservatives became more confident of victory, believing that the Roman Catholic, Jewish and Church of England blocks of votes were likely to be solid in support of Cohen. The non-conformists were also strong in the division and so the Liberals were also reporting confidence. On polling day it turned out that the Conservatives had the majority, although with a narrow lead of only 685 votes, the seat was evidently not safe.

=== 1886 ===
As an election loomed in June 1886, Lionel Cohen declared his intention to fight the seat again. Almost simultaneously, William Digby announced that he would not be a candidate again. The Paddington North Liberals therefore invited John Kempster, who had contested Enfield at the 1885 election, to be their candidate. Kempster was a Director of the Artizans, Labourers, and General Dwellings Company Ltd and therefore a popular man among the working-class residents in the constituency.

At this election, the Irish vote switched sides: having backed the Conservatives in 1885 during a temporary alliance over opposition to the Liberal budget, Gladstone's announcement of his support for home rule for Ireland led to strong support for the Liberals. The Irish vote in Paddington North was sizable and Cohen's denunciation of home rule together with Kempster's support for it had its effect in reducing the impact of a strong national trend towards the Conservatives. Cohen was re-elected with a slightly increased majority of 911 votes.

=== 1887 ===
In 1887, Lionel Cohen was taken ill with pleurisy whilst on holiday in Nice. He returned home to recuperate, but was thought by his doctor to have returned to work too early. He died of coronary thrombosis on 26 June 1887, thereby forcing a by-election. The Conservatives quickly (on 28 June) invited John Aird to defend the seat. Aird had nearly forty years of experience as a public works contractor and engineer, and was a Paddington local. Paddington North Liberals chose Edmund Routledge, a member of the Routledge publishing family.

The major issue was still home rule for Ireland. The Liberals felt that they had done too little to promote and defend their policy in 1886 and determined to remedy the deficiency. At the same time, Routledge also said that he believed Ireland under home rule should continue to send MPs to the UK Parliament. This commitment was enough for George Trevelyan, a leading member of the Liberal Unionists to send him a letter of support: there was still hope at the time of the by-election of a reunion of the divided Liberal Party. However, the Marquess of Hartington, another Liberal Unionist, endorsed Aird.

On polling day, a rumour circulated that Aird's company was a large employer of foreign labour to enable it to compete against British firms. The rumour appears to have been false. The election result showed that the situation in Paddington North had shifted to the Liberals since 1886, but not enough to endanger the Conservatives' hold on the seat.

=== 1892 ===
The Liberals had hopes of winning the 1892 general election, having rebuilt their strength after the split of 1886. Paddington North Liberals adopted Thomas Terrell, a barrister who had trained as an analytical chemist and also wrote novels and had stood in Devonport in 1885. Terrell started his attempt to dislodge Aird early, and held large public meetings outlining the Gladstone "London Programme". This campaign was populist and attacked landlords for failing to financially support government institutions in the capital.

Terrell attracted support from the Paddington Local Option Union, which campaigned for temperance and legal restrictions on alcohol sales to be imposed by local authorities. However, when the Local Option Union circulated a pamphlet attacking Aird, the senior members of the Local Option Union whose names were attached protested that they had not approved it, and it had to be withdrawn. Although Terrell managed to improve on the performance at the 1887 by-election, he was still 310 votes short of winning.

=== 1895 ===
The 1895 general election happened suddenly. The Paddington North Liberals fell back on a local candidate: their chairman George H. Maberly. On 25 April 1895, he was presented (by Dr John Clifford, a local Baptist Minister) with a silver tray and a framed address in honour of his service and invited to be the next Liberal candidate. Maberly was reluctant due to personal difficulties with the work, but at a meeting on 27 June he accepted. Maberly's name was similar to that of Major-General Moberly who sat on the London School Board from Paddington but was a Conservative: Moberley pointed this out at the end of the campaign.

Aird strongly attacked the record of the previous Liberal government whose resignation had forced the election, which he insisted had spent too much time discussing abstract constitutional ideas and too little time discussing "constructive social reform". He supported a moderate move towards women's suffrage, whereby a widow or spinster (if a householder) could vote. In line with the national trend, Aird increased his majority to just under 1,000 votes.

=== 1900 ===
For the 1900 general election, Wilfrid Fordham was unanimously adopted as Liberal candidate. He was a young barrister and nephew of Sir Wilfrid Lawson, Liberal MP for Cockermouth, with whom he shared his politics: his two main policies at the election were opposition to the South African war and support for temperance. Aird was readopted and attacked the Liberals for adopting socialistic policies which would hurt trade; he supported the government on its approach in South Africa.

Aird also supported conciliation in industry in order to avoid strike action. Local labour interest was however on the side of Fordham, who received the endorsement of the Shop Assistants' Union after giving favourable answers to questions. Fordham's spirited campaign however failed to fit with the priorities of the voters, who increased Aird's majority.

=== 1906 ===
Aird was in his late-sixties after the 1900 general election. At the end of 1902, a rumour circulated that he would not be contesting the next election, and that the Paddington Conservative Association had in mind a South African millionaire as their new candidate. Aird denied the rumour, but in July 1904 aged seventy; he announced that he would give up the seat owing to growing inability to perform his duties. After a committee was appointed to find a candidate, on 12 December 1904 the Executive recommended Lionel Phillips to a general meeting of the Association. Phillips was duly adopted on 21 December.

However, Phillips' active business interests (he was a Director of several South African companies including the Central Mining and Investment Corporation Ltd and the Village Main Reef Gold Mining Company Ltd) left him no time to nurse the constituency and in August 1905 he gave up the candidature. Initially, the Conservatives invited John Aird, son of the sitting MP, to contest the seat, but as Aird had already been selected for Southampton, he declined. Finally, the Conservatives selected Arthur Strauss, a metal merchant and former MP for Camborne, although a minority group at the adoption meeting preferred Herbert Jessel, 1st Baron Jessel: Strauss prevailed by 70 votes to 28.

Without difficulty, the Paddington North Liberal Council selected Leo Chiozza Money, an economist and journalist who was a rising star in the party nationally with some degree of fame. His fight to finally win the seat for Liberalism attracted attention outside the constituency and Liberal headquarters assisted by prioritising the seat. Money was aided by Dr. Clifford who had become nationally famous for leading passive resistance to the Education Act 1903 (refusing to pay taxes, among other protests).

The fact that Leo Chiozza Money was from Genoa and Strauss was Jewish led to the establishment of a committee of local electors led by Col. Stewart and Alfred Darch who declared "the present position of the voters in the division has been rendered intolerable by the action of the Liberal and Conservative Associations, each having made the grievous mistake of failing to nominate an Englishman as a candidate for the constituency". With a general election imminent in December 1905, they signed a requisition to Sir Henry Burdett to stand as an Independent Unionist candidate. Burdett accepted, being careful to say that he did not object to Strauss on the grounds of being a Jew but merely as a foreigner. Another point of difference was that Strauss was a supporter of Tariff Reform while Burdett was a supporter of Free Trade.

One of Burdett's meetings was very rowdy, and a number of the attendees complained of having been robbed there.

When supporters of Burdett claimed that he ought to be considered the proper Conservative candidate, the former Mayor of Paddington William Urquhart (a leader of the Jessel faction) wrote to the newspapers to object that Strauss had been properly selected and attacking the Burdett camp for splitting the vote. Strauss' election address attacked Burdett in such terms that Burdett issued writs against him and the local newspapers for Corrupt Practices. A leaflet was also circulated by Dr. Clifford refuting the implication that Chiozza Money was an atheist. On polling day, Chiozza Money managed to win the seat easily, polling more than Strauss and Burdett combined.

=== January 1910 ===
Despite the loss of the seat, the Paddington North Conservative Association again selected Arthur Strauss as their candidate. Opposition to Strauss persisted and the dissenting members petitioned Conservative Central Office in October 1909 as an election began to look imminent; Central Office refused to intervene, and the members set up the "League of Patriotic Electors of North Paddington". Having thus departed from the Conservative Association, Strauss was adopted as the Conservative Party candidate without difficulty on 14 December 1909. The League of Patriotic Electors eventually decided not to fight, due to the sudden constitutional crisis over the rejection of the 1909 budget.

Strauss again put himself forward as a Tariff reform candidate, and the adoption of protective tariffs by Germany, the United States of America and some British colonies became a central part of his argument. Chiozza Money's experience as an economist led to him being praised by Winston Churchill (then a Liberal) for knowing the issues better than any; he had also become popular amongst the working men of Harrow Road. A close fight was again in prospect. In the end, Strauss managed to regain the seat by nearly 900 votes.

A curious set of legal cases arose from this election. On 27 December 1909, PC Gregory of Paddington and another officer were attacked by three men who were subsequently convicted of Grievous Bodily Harm and assault. During the election, the Liberals sent round a leaflet claiming the three were sent to Chiozza Money's election meetings to shout him down, and blaming the men's landlord George Steer. Steer sued the printers of the leaflet, and the Liberal agent, for libel. The special jury found for Steer and awarded damages of £100.

=== December 1910 ===
It became obvious very soon after the January 1910 election that a second general election might have to be called to resolve the constitutional crisis. Chiozza Money, out of Parliament, was an attractive prospect for any Liberal Association seeking a candidate. He was considered for a by-election at a safe seat in Glamorgan in March 1910, but ruled himself out. Simultaneously he wrote to the Paddington North Liberals informing them that he would not fight their seat again (he was subsequently adopted for East Northamptonshire).

The Association were unsuccessful in trying to persuade Chiozza Money to reconsider. The Liberals therefore selected instead James Fairbank, a member of Paddington Borough Council who had narrowly been defeated at the London County Council election of 1910. However, Fairbank withdrew due to ill health in July and instead Leonard Franklin (Chairman of North Paddington Liberal Association since 1908) was picked. This made Paddington North one of only two constituencies (St Pancras South was the other) where both candidates were Jewish.

Strauss spent the short time of the Parliament arranging for a party of ten constituents to visit Germany to see the effect of protective tariffs. The constituency was strongly fought, and Strauss emerged victorious, with his majority slightly reduced to 589 votes.

== Members of Parliament ==
Election	Member	Party
1885	Lionel Cohen	Conservative
1887 by-election	Sir John Aird, Bt	Conservative
1906	Leo Chiozza Money	Liberal
Jan 1910	Arthur Strauss	Conservative
1918	Sir William Perring	Coalition Conservative
1922	Sir William Perring	Conservative
1929	Brendan Bracken	Conservative
1945	Sir Noel Mason-Macfarlane	Labour
1946 by-election	Bill Field	Labour
1953 by-election	Ben Parkin	Labour
1969 by-election	Arthur Latham	Labour
Feb 1974	constituency abolished: see Paddington	

== Elections ==
=== Elections in the 1880s ===
General election 1885: Paddington North
Party	Candidate	Votes	%	±%
Conservative	Lionel Louis Cohen	2,482	58.0	
Liberal	William Digby	1,797	42.0	
Majority		685	16.0	
Turnout		4,279	80.1	
Registered electors		5,345		
Conservative win (new seat)				

General election 1886: Paddington North
Party	Candidate	Votes	%	±%
Conservative	Lionel Louis Cohen	2,300	62.3	+4.3
Liberal	John Kempster	1,389	37.7	−4.3
Majority		911	24.6	+8.6
Turnout		3,689	69.0	−11.1
Registered electors		5,345		
Conservative hold		Swing	+4.3	

Following the death of Lionel Cohen:

By-election, 8 Jul 1887: Paddington North
Party	Candidate	Votes	%	±%
Conservative	John Aird	2,230	55.2	−7.1
Liberal	Edmund Routledge	1,812	44.8	+7.1
Majority		418	10.4	−14.2
Turnout		4,042	71.8	+2.8
Registered electors		5,628		
Conservative hold		Swing	−7.1	

=== Elections in the 1890s ===
General election 1892: Paddington North
Party	Candidate	Votes	%	±%
Conservative	John Aird	2,591	53.2	−9.1
Liberal	Thomas Terrell	2,281	46.8	+9.1
Majority		310	6.4	−18.2
Turnout		4,872	76.2	+7.2
Registered electors		6,396		
Conservative hold		Swing	−9.1	

General election 1895: Paddington North
Party	Candidate	Votes	%	±%
Conservative	John Aird	2,849	60.6	+7.4
Liberal	George Henry Maberly	1,852	39.4	−7.4
Majority		997	21.2	+14.8
Turnout		4,701	67.4	−8.8
Registered electors		6,972		
Conservative hold		Swing	+7.4	

=== Elections in the 1900s ===
John Aird

General election 1900: Paddington North
Party	Candidate	Votes	%	±%
Conservative	John Aird	3,364	68.9	+8.3
Liberal	E. Wilfrid Fordham	1,518	31.1	−8.3
Majority		1,846	37.8	+16.6
Turnout		4,882	59.6	−7.8
Registered electors		8,197		
Conservative hold		Swing	+8.3	

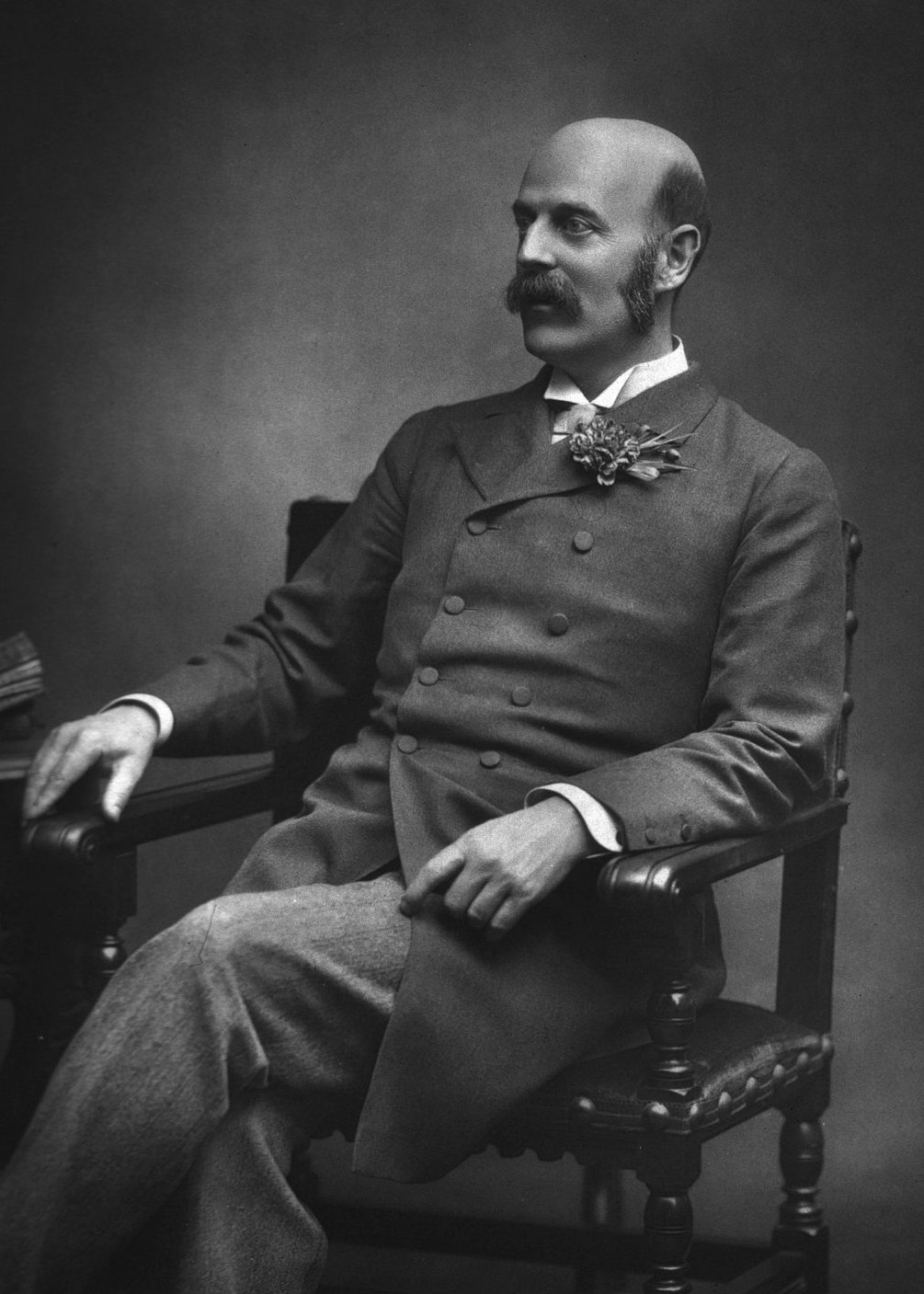
Henry Burdett

General election 1906: Paddington North
Party	Candidate	Votes	%	±%
Liberal	Leo Chiozza Money	3,825	54.1	+23.0
Conservative	Arthur Strauss	2,419	34.3	−34.6
Ind. Conservative	Henry Burdett	817	11.6	New
Majority		1,406	19.8	N/A
Turnout		7,061	73.5	+13.9
Registered electors		9,602		
Liberal gain from Conservative		Swing	+28.8	

=== Elections in the 1910s ===
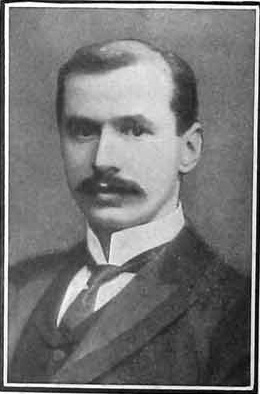
Chiozza Money

General election January 1910: Paddington North
Party	Candidate	Votes	%	±%
Conservative	Arthur Strauss	4,892	55.0	+20.7
Liberal	Leo Chiozza Money	3,999	45.0	−9.1
Majority		893	10.0	N/A
Turnout		8,891	81.2	+7.7
Conservative gain from Liberal		Swing		

Arthur Strauss

General election December 1910: Paddington North
Party	Candidate	Votes	%	±%
Conservative	Arthur Strauss	4,251	53.7	−1.3
Liberal	Leonard Franklin	3,662	46.3	+1.3
Majority		589	7.4	−2.6
Turnout		7,913	72.3	−8.9
Conservative hold		Swing		

General election 1918: Paddington North
Party		Candidate	Votes	%	±%
C	Unionist	William Perring	5,759	33.4	−20.3
	National	Wilfred S Gordon Aston	4,029	23.4	New
	NFDDSS	Edward Patrick John Barry	3,571	20.7	New
	Liberal	Leonard Franklin	1,831	10.6	−35.7
	Independent Labour	Herbert Bundy	1,275	7.4	New
	Independent Labour	Arthur Strauss	774	4.5	New
Majority			1,730	10.0	+2.6
Turnout			17,239	46.5	−25.8
	Unionist hold		Swing		
C indicates candidate endorsed by the coalition government.

=== Elections in the 1920s ===
General election 1922: Paddington North
Party	Candidate	Votes	%	±%
Unionist	William Perring	10,792	62.6	+29.2
Independent Liberal	*George Augustine Jennings	6,444	37.4	New
Majority		4,348	25.2	+15.2
Turnout		17,236	45.6	−0.9
Unionist hold		Swing		

*Adopted as official Liberal candidate, but party withdrew support during campaign following exposure of crooked past.

General election 1923: Paddington North
Party	Candidate	Votes	%	±%
Unionist	William Perring	8,721	38.7	−23.9
Labour	John William Gordon	6,954	30.8	New
Liberal	Herbert Arthur Baker	6,873	30.5	−6.9
Majority		1,767	7.9	−17.3
Turnout		22,548	59.7	+14.1
Unionist hold		Swing		

General election 1924: Paddington North
Party	Candidate	Votes	%	±%
Unionist	William Perring	14,044	51.0	+12.3
Labour	John William Gordon	10,481	38.1	+7.3
Liberal	Albert Charles Crane	3,013	10.9	−19.6
Majority		3,563	12.9	+5.0
Turnout		27,538	72.0	+12.3
Unionist hold		Swing		

General election 1929: Paddington North
Party	Candidate	Votes	%	±%
Unionist	Brendan Bracken	13,876	40.9	−10.1
Labour	John William Gordon	13,348	39.3	+1.2
Liberal	Reginald Myer	6,723	19.8	+8.9
Majority		528	1.6	−11.3
Turnout		33,947	69.0	−3.0
Unionist hold		Swing	-5.6	

=== Elections in the 1930s ===
General election 1931: Paddington North
Party	Candidate	Votes	%	±%
Conservative	Brendan Bracken	23,901	71.4	+30.5
Labour	Esther Rickards	9,597	28.6	−10.7
Majority		14,304	42.8	+42.2
Turnout		33,498	67.5	−1.5
Conservative hold		Swing		

General election 1935: Paddington North
Party	Candidate	Votes	%	±%
Conservative	Brendan Bracken	17,153	59.4	−12.0
Labour Co-op	Caroline Ganley	9,925	34.4	+5.8
Liberal	George de Swiet	1,795	6.2	New
Majority		7,228	25.0	−17.8
Turnout		28,873	60.3	−7.2
Conservative hold		Swing		

General Election 1939–40:

Another General Election was required to take place before the end of 1940. The political parties had been making preparations for an election to take place from 1939 and by the end of this year, the following candidates had been selected:

- Conservative: Brendan Bracken
- Labour: G M Copeland

=== Elections in the 1940s ===
General election 1945: Paddington North
Party	Candidate	Votes	%	±%
Labour	Noel Mason-Macfarlane	16,638	61.2	+26.8
Conservative	Brendan Bracken	10,093	37.1	−22.3
Socialist (GB)	Clifford Groves	472	1.7	New
Majority		6,545	24.1	N/A
Turnout		27,203	71.0	+10.7
Labour gain from Conservative		Swing		

Following the resignation of Sir Noel Mason-Macfarlane:

1946 Paddington North by-election
Party	Candidate	Votes	%	±%
Labour	Bill Field	13,082	55.6	−5.6
Conservative	Lawrence Turner	10,165	43.2	+6.1
Socialist (GB)	Clifford Groves	286	1.2	−0.5
Majority		2,917	12.4	−11.7
Turnout		23,533	53.9	−17.1
Labour hold		Swing		

=== Elections in the 1950s ===
General election 1950: Paddington North
Party	Candidate	Votes	%	±%
Labour	Bill Field	18,690	51.6	−9.6
Conservative	Lawrence Turner	14,829	41.0	+3.9
Liberal	John Anthony Seabrook	2,081	5.7	New
Communist	Daniel Cohen	417	1.2	New
Socialist (GB)	Gilbert McClatchie	192	0.5	−1.2
Majority		3,861	10.6	−13.5
Turnout		36,209	81.4	+10.4
Labour hold		Swing		

General election 1951: Paddington North
Party	Candidate	Votes	%	±%
Labour	Bill Field	19,923	55.7	+4.1
Conservative	Julian Ridsdale	15,874	44.3	+3.3
Majority		4,049	11.4	+0.8
Turnout		35,797	81.0	−0.4
Labour hold		Swing		

Following the resignation of Bill Field:

1953 Paddington North by-election
Party	Candidate	Votes	%	±%
Labour	Ben Parkin	14,274	53.8	−1.9
Conservative	John Eden	12,014	45.3	+1.0
Socialist (GB)	W.E. Waters	242	0.9	New
Majority		2,260	8.5	−2.9
Turnout		26,530	60.3	−20.7
Labour hold		Swing		

General election 1955: Paddington North
Party	Candidate	Votes	%	±%
Labour	Ben Parkin	16,462	53.4	−2.3
Conservative	Victor Goodhew	14,370	46.6	+2.3
Majority		2,092	6.8	−4.6
Turnout		30,832	72.2	−8.8
Labour hold		Swing		

General election 1959: Paddington North
Party	Candidate	Votes	%	±%
Labour	Ben Parkin	14,397	51.4	−2.0
Conservative	Harold Sebag-Montefiore	13,629	48.6	+2.0
Majority		768	2.8	−4.0
Turnout		40,952	68.4	−3.8
Labour hold		Swing		

=== Elections in the 1960s ===
General election 1964: Paddington North
Party	Candidate	Votes	%	±%
Labour	Ben Parkin	14,607	57.9	+6.5
Conservative	Jimmy Edwards	10,639	42.1	−6.5
Majority		3,968	15.8	+13.0
Turnout		25,246	65.1	−3.3
Labour hold		Swing		

General election 1966: Paddington North
Party	Candidate	Votes	%	±%
Labour	Ben Parkin	14,445	58.4	+0.5
Conservative	John Macdonald	7,981	32.3	−9.8
Liberal	David Griffiths	2,287	9.3	New
Majority		6,464	26.1	+10.3
Turnout		24,713	66.4	+1.3
Labour hold		Swing		

Following the death of Ben Parkin:

1969 Paddington North by-election
Party	Candidate	Votes	%	±%
Labour	Arthur Latham	7,969	51.7	−6.7
Conservative	Richard Price	7,452	48.3	+16.0
Majority		517	3.4	−22.7
Turnout		15,421	46.3	−20.1
Labour hold		Swing		

=== Elections in the 1970s ===
General election 1970: Paddington North
Party	Candidate	Votes	%	±%
Labour	Arthur Latham	11,645	54.8	−3.6
Conservative	Richard Price	8,590	40.4	+8.1
Liberal	Mario Uziell-Hamilton	1,012	4.8	−4.5
Majority		3,055	14.4	−11.7
Turnout		21,247	62.6	−3.8
Labour hold		Swing		
