= Brendan Bracken =

Irish-born businessman and British politician (1901–1958)

The Right Honourable The Viscount Bracken PC
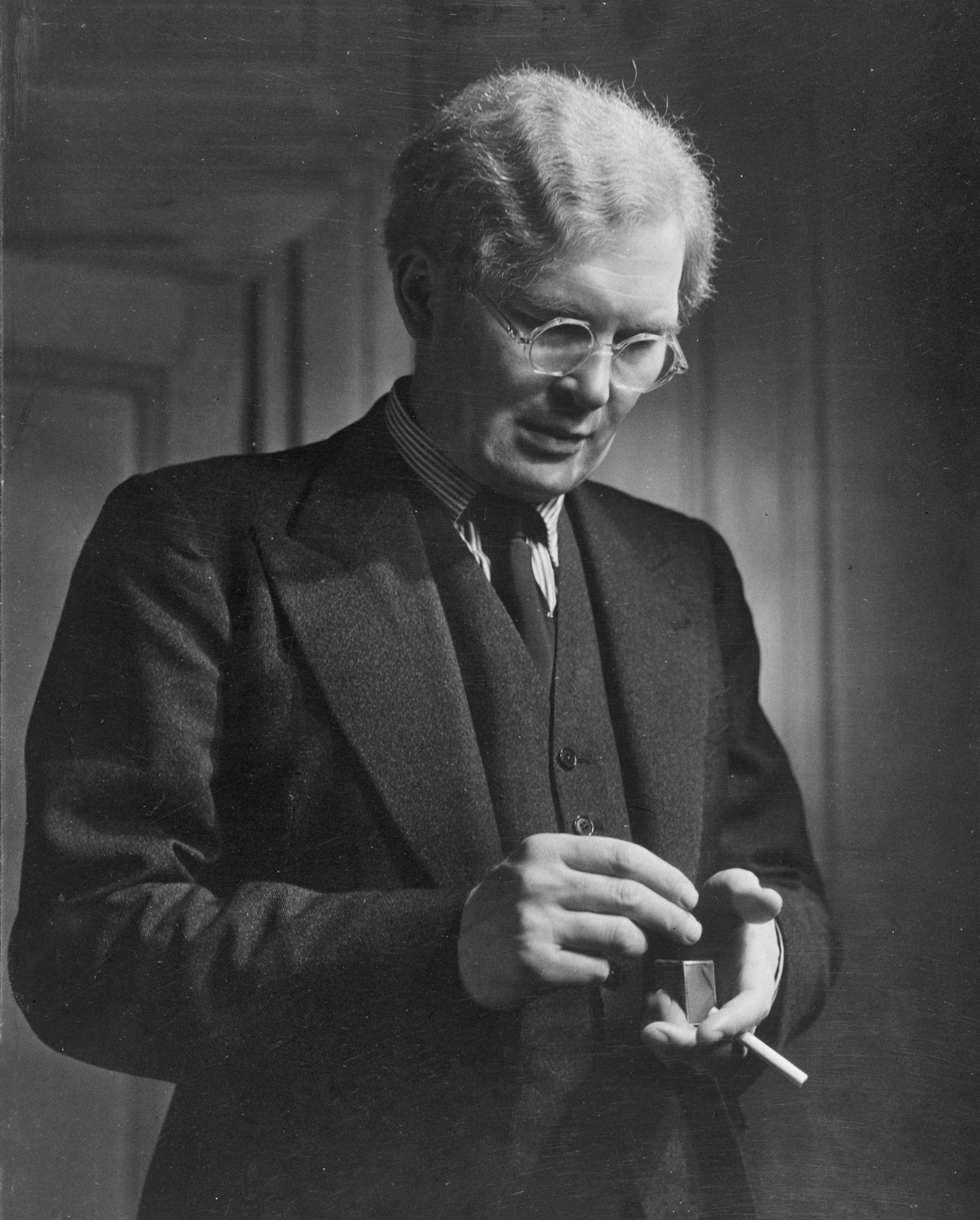
- Bracken in 1947

First Lord of the Admiralty
- In office 25 May 1945 – 26 July 1945
- Monarch: George VI
- Prime Minister: Winston Churchill
- Preceded by: A. V. Alexander
- Succeeded by: A. V. Alexander

Minister of Information
- In office 20 July 1941 – 25 May 1945
- Prime Minister: Winston Churchill
- Preceded by: Duff Cooper
- Succeeded by: Geoffrey Lloyd

Parliamentary Private Secretary to the Prime Minister
- In office 1940–1941
- Prime Minister: Winston Churchill
- Preceded by: Lord Dunglass
- Succeeded by: George Harvie-Watt

Member of Parliament
- In office 15 November 1945 – 7 January 1952
- Preceded by: Leonard Lyle
- Succeeded by: Nigel Nicolson
- Constituency: Bournemouth (1945–1950); Bournemouth East and Christchurch (1950–1952)
- In office 30 May 1929 – 5 July 1945
- Preceded by: William Perring
- Succeeded by: Noel Mason-MacFarlane
- Constituency: Paddington North

Personal details
- Born: Brendan Rendall Bracken; 15 February 1901 Templemore, County Tipperary, Ireland
- Died: 8 August 1958 (aged 57) London, England
- Party: Conservative
- Parent: Joseph Kevin Bracken (father)

Brendan Rendall Bracken, 1st Viscount Bracken (15 February 1901 – 8 August 1958), was an Irish-born businessman, politician and a Minister of Information and First Lord of the Admiralty in Winston Churchill's War Cabinet.

He is best remembered for supporting Churchill during his whole political career.

A noted publisher and editor, he was also the founder of the modern version of the Financial Times and of the monthly business magazine The Banker, as well as Managing Editor of The Economist.

He was Minister of Information from 1941 to 1945, managing the United Kingdom's propaganda efforts against Nazi Germany during the War.

== Early life ==
Brendan Rendall Bracken was born in Templemore, County Tipperary, Ireland, the second son and third of the four children of Joseph Kevin Bracken (1852–1904), builder, monumental mason and founding member of the GAA, and his second wife, Hannah Agnes Ryan (1872–1928). His father had belonged to the Irish Republican Brotherhood (IRB).

Widowed in 1904, Hannah Bracken had moved her family (including two stepdaughters) by 1908 to Dublin, where Brendan attended St Patrick's National School, Drumcondra, until 1910, when he was transferred to the O'Connell School, run by the Irish Christian Brothers. Distressed by his misbehaviour, his mother sent him in 1915 to Mungret College, a Jesuit boarding school in County Limerick, but he quickly bolted and ran up hotel bills. She then sent him to Australia to live with a cousin who was a priest in Echuca, Victoria. The young man led a nomadic existence in Australia, moving often but reading avidly, as an auto-didact.

In 1919, Bracken returned briefly to Ireland, finding his mother settled in County Meath. He distanced himself from Ireland as well as his siblings, who were in revolt over their father's inheritance. He moved instead to settle in Liverpool.

In 1920, he appeared at Sedbergh School, claiming to be a 15-year-old and an Australian, to have been orphaned in a bush fire and to have a family connection to Montagu Rendell, the headmaster of Winchester College. Without fully believing the story, Sedbergh's headmaster, impressed by the young Bracken's depth of knowledge and eagerness to progress, accepted him. By the end of one term, his Irish republican heritage and his five formative years in Australia had blended with the elements and trappings of a British public school man.

He might have had good reason to hide his Irish heritage, as the Irish War of Independence (1919–1921) had aroused hostility toward Irish people living in Great Britain. For whatever reason, that denial became a regular feature of his life. Another example occurred in 1926, when he met Major-General Emmet Dalton, a former senior commander in the new Irish Army, in London.

The former British Army officer, turned IRA confidant, who was one of General Michael Collins's right-hand men, recalled meeting Bracken at national school in Dublin. Bracken denied that, but Dalton insisted that he remembered the smell of Bracken's corduroy trousers. A third example occurred during the Second World War, when Bracken told people that his brother had been killed in action at Narvik, but his brother was alive and well in Ireland and was importuning Brendan for money.

== Business and political career ==
After Sedbergh, whose "old boy" tie he used to good effect, Bracken was briefly a schoolmaster at Bishop's Stortford College. He moved to London, where he joined the League of Nations Union and made pro-imperialist speeches. He obtained a job at the Empire Review, where he got acquainted with J. L. Garvin, former editor of The Observer, who would introduce him to Winston Churchill in the summer of 1923.

He then made a successful career from 1922 as a magazine publisher and newspaper editor in London. His initial success was based on selling advertising space to at least cover the cost of each number. In the 1923 election, he assisted Winston Churchill's unsuccessful attempt to be elected as Member of Parliament (MP) for Leicester West, which began their political association. He also assisted in Churchill's 1924 Westminster Abbey by-election campaign. In the fighting that occurred on the streets, Bracken was stabbed.

He joined the publishing company Eyre & Spottiswoode and, in 1925, became a director of the company.

In 1926, he was the founding editor of The Banker, and magazine and bankers still name their respected annual Bank of the Year awards "Brackens" in his honour. The Banker features a regular column called "Bracken", focusing on providing views and perspectives on how to improve the global financial system. He edited the Financial News, and The Practitioner before being promoted to managing director of The Economist in 1928.

Many of his early magazine stories included a political flavour, and he commissioned articles from a wide range of politicians such as Churchill and Benito Mussolini. Business and politics permanently overlapped in his life, like that of the career of his occasional friend Lord Beaverbrook. He needed politicians for stories and they needed the publicity his publications gave. A supporter of Churchill from 1923, who was out of Parliament and in his political wilderness, Bracken was invited to join Churchill's "Other Club". Their lives changed from the outbreak of the Second World War in 1939.

Bracken himself was elected to the House of Commons in the 1929 general election as a Unionist for the London constituency of North Paddington, which he won by just 528 votes. Stanley Baldwin described Bracken as Churchill's "faithful chela", chela being the Hindi word for disciple.

During Churchill's "Wilderness Years", Bracken would become his main support. From 1934 Brendan also supported Churchill's calls for rearmament in Parliament. Later, when King George VI personally expressed his concern that an Irishman, son of an IRB man, should be appointed a Government Minister and member of the Privy Council. Churchill stood up for his protégé and wrote to the King: “He has sometimes been almost my sole supporter in the years when I have been striving to get this country properly defended”.

=== Assists in selection of Churchill ===
In two matters relating to Churchill, Bracken can be said to have played a key part behind the scenes. When Neville Chamberlain prepared to resign in May 1940, the candidates to succeed him were Churchill or Lord Halifax. The political issue at stake at the time was which potential successor the Labour Party would accept in the formation of a National Government. Churchill's view was that the Labour Party would not support him and so agreed with Chamberlain to nominate Halifax.

When Bracken became aware of Churchill's agreement to nominate Halifax, he convinced Churchill that the Labour Party would indeed support him as Chamberlain's successor and Lord Halifax's appointment would hand certain victory to Hitler.

Bracken advised Churchill tactically to say nothing when the three met to arrange the succession. After a silence when Churchill was expected to nominate Halifax, the latter obligingly ruled himself out, and Churchill was put forward as Britain's wartime Prime Minister, having avoided any appearance of disloyalty to Chamberlain.

=== Support from the US 1940–1941 ===
When Churchill became Prime Minister in May 1940, Bracken helped in moving him into 10 Downing Street. Bracken was sworn into the Privy Council in 1940, despite his lack of ministerial experience, and became Churchill's parliamentary private secretary.

An insight into the nature of the relationship between Churchill and Bracken is found in Churchill's history of the Second World War. Churchill wrote that he had received telegrams from Washington about Harry Hopkins "stating that he was the closest confidant and personal agent of the President. I therefore arranged that he should be met by Mr. Brendan Bracken on his arrival." The suggestion was that Churchill had arranged, as is diplomatic custom, for Hopkins to be met by the person who was his closest counterpart in British government and that Bracken often played the role of confidant and personal agent to Churchill. After Bracken met Hopkins's flight on 9 January 1941, Churchill and Hopkins forged a close association. According to Charles Lysaght's biography, Bracken and Hopkins had met in America in the late 1930s, and that personal tie helped speed the decision to assist Britain nearly a year before the US actually entered the war.

=== Minister of Information ===
In 1941, Bracken was persuaded by Lord Beaverbrook and Churchill himself to become Britain's wartime Minister for Information. At the same time, he was one of the heads of the Political Warfare Executive. He won over most of the proprietors by giving them more news, often on a confidential basis, and censorship was kept to a minimum. The BBC was also allowed a lot of freedom as long as it behaved according to the UK's war interests.

== Postwar years ==
In 1945, after the end of the wartime coalition, Bracken was briefly First Lord of the Admiralty in the Churchill caretaker ministry, but left that post after the general election won by Clement Attlee's Labour Party. Bracken lost his North Paddington seat to Noel Mason-MacFarlane, but soon returned to the Commons as Member of Parliament for Bournemouth in a November 1945 by-election. He was a relentless critic of the Labour government's policy of nationalisation and the retreat from empire.

At the 1950 general election, he was returned for Bournemouth East and Christchurch, a seat he held until the general election the following year. His last speech in the House of Commons, on 5 July 1951, concerned the Hants and Dorset Bus Company Dispute.

In early 1952 he was elevated to the peerage as Viscount Bracken, of Christchurch in the County of Southampton, but never used the title or sat in the House of Lords, which he called "the Morgue".

At that stage, he was also publishing The Economist. In 1951, with his love of history, he helped found History Today magazine.

From 1950 he was chairman of the board of governors of his former school, Sedbergh School, where he went frequently. He organised and financed the restoration of the eighteenth-century school building as a library, with a commemoratory inscription, "Remember Winston Churchill", which still stands today.

From 1955 he was a trustee of the National Gallery.

== Death ==
A heavy smoker, Lord Bracken died of oesophageal cancer on 8 August 1958, aged 57, at the flat of his friend Sir Patrick Hennessy in Park Lane, in London. Although raised a Catholic, he refused the last rites of the Church despite efforts by his nephew, the Revd Kevin Bracken, a Cistercian monk at Bethlehem Abbey, Portglenone, County Antrim, to persuade him. As he was unmarried and had no heir, the viscountcy died with him.

Upon learning of his demise, Churchill reacted to the news of his death by saying "Poor, dear Brendan."

By his own wishes, he was cremated without ceremony at Golders Green Crematorium in north London. His ashes were scattered behind the Cinque Ports by his chauffeur, Alex Aley, at Romney Marshes of which "his master, Winston Churchill was the then Lord Warden".

At the time of his death Bracken's estate came to £145,032. On his instructions his papers were burnt by his chauffeur. Some of his documents are kept at the Churchill Archives Centre of the University of Cambridge.

== Legacy ==
Bracken was a consequential figure in British politics during his lifetime. His biographer, Charles Lysaght, wrote about him: “Without him Churchill might not have survived politically, let alone become Prime Minister. He was also a spin doctor par excellence half a century before the term was invented. And he was the effective founding father of the modern Financial Times, Britain’s highest quality daily newspaper.”

Randolph Churchill, Winston Churchill's son, once described Bracken as “the fantasist whose dreams came true".

Bracken and his relationship with Churchill were the focus of an exhibit at The Little Museum of Dublin in 2016 called Churchill & the Irishman. The exhibit featured a collection of Bracken's letters to his mother. This was the first time that Bracken had been the subject of an exhibition. The exhibition was formally opened by John Ridding, at the time the Chief Executive of the Financial Times.

=== In popular culture ===
In Evelyn Waugh's 1945 novel Brideshead Revisited, Bracken served as a model for the character of Rex Mottram. Bracken is featured in the 1981 TV miniseries Winston Churchill: The Wilderness Years, portrayed by Tim Pigott-Smith. In The Gathering Storm (2002), he is played by Anthony Brophy.

It has been theorized that Bracken may have been the inspiration for Big Brother and/or O'Brien of the novel Nineteen Eighty-Four, as George Orwell worked at the Ministry of Information under Bracken's term as Minister of Information.

Lord Bracken appears as a major character in Thomas Kilroy's 1986 play Double Cross. Stephen Rea originated the role.

=== 2010 and 2015 television documentaries ===
On 21 December 2010, RTÉ One broadcast an hour-long TV documentary about his life entitled Brendan Bracken – Churchill's Irishman. The programme was made by Spanish production company, Marbella Productions, in association with RTÉ, and examined Bracken's life through photographs, interviews, rare archive footage and dramatic reconstructions, and told of his importance in the areas of British political and journalistic life, despite his attempt to hide from history by having all his papers burned after his death.

The 2015 television documentary Churchill's Secret Son is the 90-minute version of the previous documentary Churchill's Irishman, updated by the producers including additional images, stories about Bracken's life and additional footage. The programme was transmitted on Discovery UK's History Channel on 24 January 2015 at 10pm, as part of the British History week, and coincided with the 50th anniversary of Churchill's death in 1965.

== Bibliography ==
- Andrew Boyle. Poor, Dear Brendan: The Quest for Brendan Bracken; Hutchinson, 1974. ISBN 978-0-09-120860-8
- Charles Lysaght. Brendan Bracken. London; Allen Lane, 1979. ISBN 0-7139-0969-2.
- Charles Lysaght & Trevor White. Churchill and the Irishman: The Unbelievable Life of Brendan Bracken; The Little Museum of Dublin 2016. ISBN 978-0-9570286-3-0

Parliament of the United Kingdom
Preceded by Sir William Perring	Member of Parliament for Paddington North; 1929–1945	Succeeded by Sir Noel Mason-Macfarlane
Preceded by Sir Leonard Lyle, Bt	Member of Parliament for Bournemouth; 1945–1950	Constituency abolished
New constituency	Member of Parliament for Bournemouth East & Christchurch; 1950–1952	Succeeded by Nigel Nicolson
Political offices
Preceded by Sir Duff Cooper	Minister of Information; 1941–1945	Succeeded by Geoffrey Lloyd
Preceded by Sir A. V. Alexander	First Lord of the Admiralty; 1945	Succeeded by Sir A. V. Alexander
Peerage of the United Kingdom
New creation	Viscount Bracken; 1952–1958	Extinct
