= Ben Parkin =

British politician (1906–1969)

Ben Parkin MP
- Born: 21 April 1906
- Died: 3 June 1969 (aged 63)
- Education: Wycliffe College
- Alma mater: Lincoln College
- Occupations: Politician, teacher

Benjamin Theaker Parkin (21 April 1906 – 3 June 1969) was a British teacher and politician who served as the Labour Party Member of Parliament for Stroud and for Paddington North. His father, Captain B. D. Parkin, served as Headmaster of Stonehouse Council School in Gloucestershire from 1912 to 1939, and as Chairman of Stonehouse Parish Council.

== Early career ==
Parkin was educated at Wycliffe College, from which he went to Lincoln College, Oxford; he also studied at Strasbourg University. He became a teacher, and by the time of the outbreak of the Second World War was on the staff of his old college; he left to serve in the Royal Air Force as Flight-Lieutenant.

== Parliament ==
Shortly before the end of the Second World War, Parkin was elected as the Labour Party MP for Stroud at the 1945 general election, becoming the first ever Labour MP for the constituency. He was on the left wing of the party and was part of a delegation of Labour MPs who met Soviet premier Joseph Stalin in 1947; when he voted against the Ireland Bill, he was warned by the Chief Whip about his conduct.

== Paddington MP ==
At the 1950 general election, the Stroud constituency was abolished and Parkin was narrowly defeated by only 28 votes at the new Stroud and Thornbury seat. He contested the seat again at the 1951 general election, but lost again, this time by 1,582 votes. He was chosen to replace Bill Field, who had resigned as the MP for Paddington North after a conviction for importuning. Parkin won the resulting by-election in 1953. He made another visit to the Soviet Union and one to the People's Republic of China in 1954.

In 1956, he made the observation that, when telling the Chinese that he represented Paddington, they had responded by saying "That is where the Church owns the brothels, isn't it?"; Parkin pointed out this had a grain of truth. He was strongly in favour of removing street prostitution and also campaigned against drug abuse in his constituency.

== Rachman ==
Parkin's most prominent campaign was over housing conditions. He was vocal in calling attention to the misdeeds of property magnate Peter Rachman, and others like him, calling for a system of licensing of private landlords. Parkin alleged that Rachman's reported death was merely a ploy to escape further scrutiny. He took up other housing issues, including overcharging by Westminster City Council when it took over local council housing in 1965.

== Death ==
In 1969, Parkin died suddenly in his car while visiting his son's school in west London. At the resulting by-election, he was succeeded as MP by Arthur Latham.

== Sources ==
- M. Stenton and S. Lees, Who's Who of British MPs Vol. IV (Harvester Press, 1981)
- Obituary, The Times, 4 June 1969.

Parliament of the United Kingdom
Preceded by Sir Walter Perkins	Member of Parliament for Stroud; 1945 – 1950	Succeeded by Sir Walter Perkins
Preceded by Bill Field	Member of Parliament for Paddington North; 1953 – 1969	Succeeded by Arthur Latham
