= 1953 Paddington North by-election =

UK Parliamentary by-election

The 1953 Paddington North by-election was held on 3 December 1953, following the resignation of the incumbent Labour MP Bill Field, who had failed to overturn a conviction for "importuning for immoral purposes". The seat was retained by the Labour candidate, Ben Parkin, a left-wing former MP for Stroud.

By-election on 3 December 1953: Paddington North
Party	Candidate	Votes	%	±%
Labour	Ben Parkin	14,274	53.8	−1.9
Conservative	John Eden	12,014	45.3	+1.0
Socialist (GB)	W.E. Waters	242	0.9	New
Majority		2,260	8.5	−2.9
Turnout		26,530	60.3	−20.7
Labour hold		Swing		
