= 1950 Oxford by-election =

UK Parliamentary by-election

The 1950 Oxford by-election was held on 2 November 1950 after the incumbent Conservative MP Quintin Hogg succeeded to the peerage. The seat was retained by the Conservative candidate Lawrence Turner with an increased majority.

Oxford by-election, 1950
Party	Candidate	Votes	%	±%
Conservative	Lawrence Turner	27,583	57.50	+10.65
Labour	S K Lewis	20,385	42.50	+1.79
Majority		7,198	15.00	+8.86
Turnout		47,968		
Conservative hold		Swing	+4.33	
