= William Perring =

British politician

Member of Parliament for Paddington North
- In office 1918-1929

Mayor of Paddington
- In office 1911-1912

Personal details
- Born: 17 March 1866
- Died: 24 August 1937 (aged 71)
- Party: Conservative

Sir William George Perring (17 March 1866 – 24 August 1937) was a British Conservative politician.

== Biography ==
A member of Paddington Borough Council, he served as mayor of Paddington from 1911 to 1912. He was first elected to the House of Commons at the 1918 general election as Member of Parliament (MP) for Paddington North, when he stood as a Coalition Conservative (a holder of the "coalition coupon" issued to supporters of the coalition government led by David Lloyd George"). He was re-elected at the next three elections, and retired from the House of Commons at the 1929 general election.

Perring laid the foundation stone for the Porchester Centre in Bayswater in 1923, and opened the building in 1925. He also bequeathed a sculpture, The Reading Girl, which remains part of the entrance hall in this Grade II* listed building.

He died on 24 August 1937, aged 71.

Parliament of the United Kingdom
Preceded by Arthur Strauss	Member of Parliament for Paddington North; 1918 – 1929	Succeeded by Brendan Bracken
