= Stacey Pierson =

Chinese art historian

Stacey Pierson is an art historian specialising in Chinese ceramics and the history of collecting. She is Professor of the History of Chinese Ceramics at the School of Oriental and African Studies, University of London.

== Career ==
Pierson has a BA from Loyola Marymount, an MA from SOAS, a PG Dip from Ealing, and a DPhil from the University of Sussex. She was Curator of the Percival David Foundation of Chinese Art 1995-2007, then Senior Lecturer, and subsequently Professor of the History of Chinese Ceramics at SOAS.

She is a Fellow of the Royal Society of Antiquaries, and a Senior Fellow of the Higher Education Academy. She is also president of the Oriental Ceramic Society (London) and series editor for Routledge’s Histories of Material Culture and Collecting, 1550-1950.

== Selected publications ==
Books

- 1995 Flawless porcelains : imperial ceramics from the reign of the Chenghua emperor (London: Percival David Foundation of Chinese Art) ISBN 981306613X (with Rosemary E Scott)
- 1996 Earth, fire and water : Chinese ceramic technology: a handbook for non-specialists (London: SOAS) ISBN 0728602652
- 2000 Collecting Chinese art: interpretation and display (London: Percival David Foundation of Chinese Art) ISBN 0728603160
- 2001 Designs as signs : decoration and Chinese ceramics (London: SOAS) ISBN 0728603276
- 2002 Qingbai ware : Chinese porcelain of the Song and Yuan dynasties (London: Percival David Foundation of Chinese Art) ISBN 072860339X (with Rosemary E Scott)
- 2002 A collector's vision : ceramics for the Qianlong Emperor (London: SOAS) ISBN 0728603411 (with Amy Barnes)
- 2003 Song ceramics : objects of admiration (London: SOAS) ISBN 0728603489 (with Shane McCausland)
- 2007 Collectors, Collections and Museums: the Field of Chinese Ceramics in Britain: 1560-1960 (Bern ; Oxford : Peter Lang) ISBN 9783039105380
- 2009 Chinese Ceramics: a Design History (London: V&A) ISBN 9781851775767
- 2013 From Object to Concept: Global Consumption and the Transformation of Ming Porcelain (Hong Kong University Press) ISBN 9789888139835
- 2017 Private Collecting, Exhibitions and the Shaping of Art History in London: the Burlington Fine Arts Club, 1866-1950
- 2022 (editor) Visual, Material and Textual Cultures of Food and Drink in China, 200 BCE–1900 CE, Colloquies on Art and Archaeology in Asia, no. 25.

Articles/Chapters

- 2009 "The Percival David Collection. Towards a History of Acquisitions", Arts of Asia (May 2009)
- 2012 "The Movement of Chinese Ceramics: Appropriation in Global History", Journal of World History
- 2018 "Dining in colour: Red vessel pigments in pre-modern China", Arts of Asia, Jan 2018.
- 2019 "True or False? Defining the Fake in Chinese Porcelain", Les Cahiers de Framespa, June 2019
- 2025 "From Yuanmingyuan to Fonthill: buying Chinese ceramics in 1860s London and the invention of provenance". In C. Dakers (ed.), Millionaire Shopping: The collections of Alfred Morrison, 1821-1897 (pp. 185–208). UCL Press. http://www.jstor.org/stable/jj.26931932.11
