= Noel Mason-MacFarlane =

British Army officer, administrator and politician

Lieutenant-General Sir Noel Mason-MacFarlane KCB DSO MC**
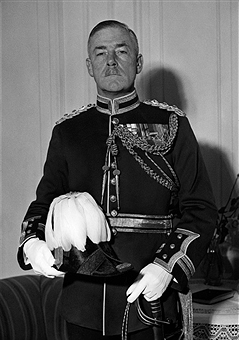
- Born: 23 October 1889; Cookham, Berkshire, England
- Died: 12 August 1953 (aged 63); Twyford, Berkshire, England
- Military career
- Allegiance: United Kingdom
- Branch: British Army
- Service years: 1909–1945
- Rank: Lieutenant-General
- Nickname: "Mac"
- Service number: 22965
- Unit: Royal Artillery
- Commands: Allied Control Commission for Italy; Governor of Gibraltar; 44th (Home Counties) Infantry Division
- Conflicts: First World War; Third Anglo-Afghan War; Second World War
- Awards: Knight Commander of the Order of the Bath; Distinguished Service Order; Military Cross & Two Bars; Mentioned in Despatches; Croix de guerre (France); Grand Cross of the Order of Polonia Restituta (Poland); Commander of the Legion of Merit (United States)

Lieutenant-General Sir Frank Noel Mason-MacFarlane, KCB, DSO, MC & Two Bars (23 October 1889 – 12 August 1953) was a senior British Army officer, administrator and politician who served as Governor of Gibraltar during the Second World War.

== Early life and military career ==
Frank Noel Mason was born on 23 October 1889, the son of a doctor. His father was convinced that war between Germany and Great Britain was inevitable and joined the Territorial Army to work as an army doctor. As a result, his father was frequently absent, and a major influence on him when growing up was a German governess hired by his father. Mason-MacFarlane was educated at Rugby School and, after attending the Royal Military Academy, Woolwich, was commissioned as a second lieutenant into the Royal Artillery in 1909. Until February 1909, his surname was Mason, but he hyphenated it that month to Mason-MacFarlane out of pride in his Scottish heritage as MacFarlane was the maiden name of his Scots mother.

Mason-MacFarlane served in the First World War on the Western Front and in Mesopotamia. An intense individualist, Mason-MacFarlane's experience as a young artillery officer left him a reputation as an officer who was always ready to "look out for trouble" and who had a profound distrust of the higher command. A non-conformist, he was known for his love of amateur theatrical acting, sports and for writing sarcastic doggerel poems mocking the high command. In the winter of 1915–16, he served with the relief forces involved in the bloody fighting outside of Kut as the British sought to unsuccessfully rescue the Indian 6th Division besieged by the Ottomans inside Kut. He was awarded the Military Cross in 1916, a bar to the award in 1918 (gazetted in September) and a second Bar in the same year, awarded while he was attached to the Artillery Headquarters of the 41st Division, the most junior Kitchener's Army division. The citation for the second Bar was published in a supplement to the London Gazette on 2 December 1918, and reads:

For conspicuous gallantry and devotion to duty. While he was engaged on a reconnaissance another officer who was with him was severely wounded by a sniper. He removed him to a place of safety and also brought in a stretcher-bearer who was wounded by the same sniper. He then completed his reconnaissance and returned with valuable and accurate information.

Mason-MacFarlane was also awarded the French Croix de guerre and mentioned in despatches during the First World War.

== Between the wars ==
Between the wars, Mason-MacFarlane attended the Staff College, Quetta from 1919 to 1920. At Quetta, his evaluation upon graduation declared his ability as "above that of any of his fellow students", though his judgement was described as only "fairly good ... rather immature and lacking balance". Afterwards, he served on regimental duties, before attending the Imperial Defence College, a prestigious posting for the most promising officers, in 1935. In 1931, after spending most of the preceding ten years in British India, he was appointed military attaché to Hungary, Austria and Switzerland. The director of M3, the intelligence section of the War Office dealing with Central Europe wrote in an evaluation of Mason-MacFarlane: "He combines a first-class brain with a remarkable flair for intelligence work. He has a keen sense of humour and is an excellent linguist. Full of mental and physical energy and with great initiative...he should go far". A lover of fast cars, he was badly injured in a car crash in 1933 that left him with spinal pain for the rest of his life. In 1934, Mason-MacFarlane returned to Great Britain.

Mason-MacFarlane served as Britain's military attaché to Berlin prior to the Second World War, under the ambassador Sir Nevile Henderson starting in January 1938. Additionally he served as military attaché to Hungary, Austria, Switzerland and Denmark. In his favourite Ford V-8 coupe, Mason-MacFarlane went out to personally observe the Anschluss after the Oberkommando der Wehrmacht denied to him that it was happening and to investigate the German-Czechoslovak border region during the May Crisis. His reports during the May Crisis that he found no evidence of an imminent German invasion of Czechoslovakia did much to cool down the heated atmosphere during the weekend of 20–22 May 1938. "Mason-Mac" as he was known to his colleagues in the embassy in Berlin was viewed as an eccentric with some like Sir Walford Selby, the ambassador in Vienna, praising him for his "consistently good advice" while others like Sir Alexander Cadogan, the Permanent Undersecretary at the Foreign Office, regarded him as reckless and too easily excited. The British historian D. C. Watt called Mason-MacFarlane a "courageous eccentric" who very much wanted to assassinate Hitler.

On 27 July 1938, Mason-MacFarlane reported to Henderson that the Wehrmacht was preparing for a war against Czechoslovakia, stating in a report that the German Army generals were "seeing to it that if the emergency arises their preparations shall not be found wanting". Henderson passed on Mason-MacFarlane's report to London, but stated he did not believe that Hitler was preparing to invade Czechoslovakia. On 3 August 1938, Henderson reported to the Foreign Secretary, Lord Halifax that up to 8 German divisions had been sent to the German-Czechoslovak border, but he believed that this was a bluff on the part of Hitler to pressure President Edvard Beneš of Czechoslovakia to grant autonomy to the Sudetenland. In his own report, Mason-MacFarlane wrote the test mobilisations performed by the army were "desperately provocative. It is hard to see how Czechoslovakia can fail to mobilise in reply". Henderson sent Mason-MacFarlane to London the next day to "discuss the extent and significance of German military preparations". During his visit to London, Mason-MacFarlane met Lord Halifax; Sir Robert Vansittart, Chief Foreign Policy Adviser; and Sir Horace Wilson, Chief Industrial Adviser and a close friend of the Prime Minister Neville Chamberlain. Halifax wanted Mason-MacFarlane to take back a personal message to Hitler, a course of action which he rejected as a "waste of time".

During his time in London, Mason-MacFarlane made clear to both the Foreign Office and War Office his disagreements with Henderson, predicating that Germany was definitely preparing to invade Czechoslovakia that year. Upon his report to Berlin, on 8 August 1938, Mason-MacFarlane met Victor von Koerber, a retired officer and Berlin correspondent of the Wiener Journal, who had excellent contacts with the German General Staff. Koerber told him that Germany was going to invade Czechoslovakia in late September 1938. Koerber arrived unannounced at Mason-MacFarlane's office with his warnings that the General Staff were opposed to a war with Czechoslovakia and would very much welcome statements once again reciting London's willingness to defend Czechoslovakia. Mason-MacFarlane dismissed Koerber as an agent provocateur. The German General Staff, opposed to a "premature" world war, had sought to persuade Hitler to put off the invasion of Czechoslovakia under the grounds that it was likely to cause a world war before Germany was properly prepared. Unable to persuade Hitler, the General Staff had turned towards Britain as their best hope of stopping a "premature" world war. Mason-MacFarlane recognised he was being used as a pawn in an internal German policy dispute, writing "any bungling of an attempt to interfere from without with Germany's domestic politics during Hitler's lifetime would most assuredly lead to exactly what we all wished to avoid".

A week later, Mason-MacFarlane changed his mind, saying that British would not "be justified in supposing that Herr Hitler has made up his mind to go to war this autumn". Henderson believed that Hitler was bluffing, only seeking to pressure Czechoslovakia to change its policies towards the Sudeten Germans under the grounds the Germany was still not ready for the world war that was likely to result from an attack on Czechoslovakia while Mason-MacFarlane believed that Hitler was serious about war with Czechoslovakia sometime in the near future. Henderson in a dispatch to Lord Halifax stated that the two options open to Britain were either to repeat the warning of 21 May 1938 that Britain would go to war if Germany invaded Czechoslovakia or alternatively to pressure President Beneš to implement the conclusions of the Runciman Mission. Mason-MacFarlane preferred the former while Henderson preferred the latter. On 21 August 1938, Mason-MacFarlane met an agent of Colonel Hans Oster, the deputy chief of the Abwehr, who told him of Fall Grün (Case Green), the plan to invade Czechoslovakia. For the first time, Mason-MacFarlane learned that Hitler planned to invade Czechoslovakia on 1 October 1938 and of his belief that neither Britain nor France would do anything in the event of the invasion. Henderson in his comments on the report wrote that it was "clearly biased and largely propaganda". In late August, Mason-MacFarlane submitted a report to Henderson declaring that if Britain made an alliance with Czechoslovakia that this offered 'an outside possibility that we might avert or at any rate postpone catastrophe".

On 23 September 1938, the outcome of the Chamberlain-Hitler summit at Bad Godesberg ended with Hitler rejecting the Anglo-French plan for the cession of the Sudetenland as taking too long and demanded the region "go home to the Reich" immediately, a demand that Chamberlain in turn rejected. In the tense atmosphere with Germany and Britain on the verge of war, Wilson was left behind by Chamberlain in Berlin to try to keep the lines of communication open. Mason-MacFarlane was sent by Henderson and Wilson to deliver a message to text of Hitler's Bad Godesberg ultimatum to Prague but the German-Czechoslovak border was closed, forcing him to cross the frontier by a forest path. While crossing the frontier, he was caught up in the barbed wire, and a nervous young Czechoslovak Army soldier helped untangle him instead of challenging him, an experience that left with the conviction that Czech morale was poor. During his journey through the Sudetenland, he had to dodge bullets as he witnessed fighting between the Nazi Sudetendeutsches Freikorps and the Czechoslovak police and army.

Upon reaching Prague and after delivering the message to President Beneš, Mason-MacFarlane telegraphed a cable to London stating based upon what he had seen in the Sudetenland that the Czechoslovak Army was suffering from low morale and would swiftly collapse if Germany invaded. Colonel H.C.T Stronge, the British military attache in Prague very strongly disagreed with Mason-MacFarlane's assessment of the Czechoslovak Army. Wilson saw Mason-MacFarlane's report predicating that Czechoslovakia would last a few days against the Wehrmacht as a reason not to go to war with Germany and circulated it widely through the corridors of Whitehall. From Berlin, Wilson telegraphed Chamberlain: "Military attache has just returned from Czechoslovakia and is convinced that resistance will prove feeble. This must be known to the French too and to the Czech General Staff as it is clearly known here". When Wilson returned to London on 27 September 1938, he took Mason-MacFarlane with him, straight to a cabinet meeting at 10 Downing Street. Mason-MacFarlane told the cabinet: "It would be very rash to base any policy on the assumption that the Czechs would fight like tigers". Cadogan wrote in his diary about the impact of Mason-MacFarlane's presentation to the cabinet: "Unfortunately Mason-Macfarlane (MA in Berlin) also here and he painted a gloomy picture of Czech morale. What does he know about it? Also meeting with Chiefs of Staff who were called in. Not very reassuring...all this produced a glacial period in Ministerial feet". General Sir Henry Pownall, the Director of Military Operations and Intelligence wrote in his diary: "We were much influenced by the views of Mason-Macfarlane who flew over from Berlin that afternoon [27 September] – he has done noble work." On 30 September 1938, the Munich Agreement put an end to the crisis which had pushed Europe to the brink of war. After the Munich Agreement, Mason-MacFarlane served as part of the Anglo-German-French-Italian commission which had the duty of deciding how much of the Sudetenland would go to Germany.

From October 1938 to February 1939, Henderson was in London being treated for the cancer which was to kill him in 1953. The chargé d'affaires, Sir George Ogilvie-Forbes, took over the British embassy in Berlin during this time. He, too, disagreed with Henderson's views of the Nazi regime, and – allying with Mason-MacFarlane – used his position to "educate" the British cabinet about Germany. On the night of 9 November 1938, Mason-MacFarlane witnessed the Kristallnacht ("night of broken glass") pogrom in Berlin, where the homes and businesses of Jews were looted and vandalised while Jews were beaten up and sometimes killed. Kristallnacht repulsed and disgusted him, adding to his dislike of the Nazi regime. On 2 January 1939, Ogilvie-Forbes very strongly endorsed a report from Mason-MacFarlane stating that the German economy was being organised for "total war" and Hitler would almost certainly invade one of his neighbours in 1939. Mason-MacFarlane stated the German economy was on "full throttle" for war and Hitler would probably invade an Eastern European state in 1939, through he also stated there was a strong possibility of Hitler attacking a Western European state. Mason-MacFarlane dismissed the possibility of an internal revolt toppling Hitler, saying that there were many brave Germans opposed to the Nazi dictatorship, but unfortunately the Nazi regime was an effective police state together with the loyalty of the majority of the Wehrmacht to Hitler meant that there was no hope of him being overthrown. William Strang of the Foreign Office called this dispatch "excellent". The possibility of Hitler attacking the Low Countries and/or France that Mason-MacFarlane had warned about had more impact on the British cabinet than did his warnings of aggression in Eastern Europe, and changed Britain's policies towards France. Henderson upon his return to the British Embassy on 13 February 1939 stated that henceforward all dispatches from Berlin had to conform to his views. In protest, Mason-MacFarlane wrote: "we remained in disagreement with his views on Hitler and on the course which Nazi Germany was likely to pursue". On 3 March 1939, Mason-MacFarlane first reported to London that he heard reports that the Wehrmacht had started stockpiling supplies in areas near the Polish border with the order that these be completed by 28 March.

Following the German occupation of the Czech half of the rump state of Czecho-Slovakia on 15 March 1939, Mason-MacFarlane's reporting from Berlin took a very hawkish tone and several times he suggested a "preventive war" against Germany. Cadogan in his diary accused him of "rather hysterical outpouring". He also became an advocate of an "Eastern Front" policy, arguing that the Reich by seizing the heavily industrialised Czech lands had just gained a massive lead in the arms race and to allow Germany to seize more of Eastern Europe would make the German economy more or less "blockade-proof". In particular, Mason-MacFarlane argued that Britain needed alliances with Poland and Romania, stating both had excellent farmland that could feed Germany in the event of a British blockade while Romania was also well endowed with oil. On 25 March 1939, Mason-MacFarlane reported to London: "Germany risks defeat only if confronted by two-front war and blockade. Such blockade can only be rapidly effective if Germany's eastern front is on or close to her present frontier and if she has to gain and hold resources essential to her powers of resistance". Mason-MacFarlane that wrote if Britain failed to secure the immediate assistance of Poland and Romania, then Germany would be fighting a "one-front war" with all the resources of the Protectorate of Bohemia-Moravia, Poland, and Romania to support the Wehrmacht. Mason-MacFarlane concluded that the Reich would be unable to fight a "two-front war" and would be forced to yield rather face a war in the "most unfavourable circumstances; it was time for Britain to force Germany to back away from its plans for expansion."

Ian Colvin, a British journalist who was the Berlin correspondent of The News Chronicle and who served as an informer for the private intelligence network maintained by Vansittart, sent a series of inaccurate reports to the British government in February–March 1939 warning of an imminent German invasion of Poland in the spring of 1939 or alternatively that Poland was about to sign an alliance with the Reich to allow passage of the Wehrmacht to conquer the Baltic states. Mason-MacFarlane added greatly to Colvin's credibility when he endorsed his reports, saying Colvin was a reliable source of information about Germany. Owing to the endorsement of Mason-MacFarlane, Colvin was able to see Cadogan on 29 March 1939 where he presented circumstantial evidence that Germany was preparing to invade Poland. Parts of the Colvin report were genuine, as it presented verbatim the orders issued by Field Marshal Walther von Brauchitsch on 27 March 1939 for the Wehrmacht to move divisions to the Polish border. Other parts of the Colvin report such as the claim that Germany was going invade Poland in April 1939 were erroneous. On 29 March, Mason-MacFarlane in support of Colvin that he it was established that arms depots were set up in East Pomerania and stated that "well informed army and SS sources" indicated to him that an invasion of Poland was planned for late April 1939. In London, Colvin warned that Hitler was planning to conquer Poland, then Lithuania, to plunder their resources to prepare for "the ultimate goal" of a war to destroy the British empire. Cadogan was so impressed with Colvin's information that he took him to see both Lord Halifax and Chamberlain the same day. Chamberlain stated that story told by Colvin was "so fantastic as to doubt its reliability", but similar reports from Mason-MacFarlane in Berlin forced the hand of the Chamberlain government into making the famous "guarantee" of Poland on 31 March 1939. In a letter to his sister, Chamberlain wrote that it was the "Colvin report" together with information from other sources that led him to agree to Lord Halifax's idea of the "guarantee" of Poland.

Mason-MacFarlane proposed the assassination of Adolf Hitler, an offer turned down by his superiors. Mason-MacFarlane's plan was to shoot Hitler while he was on a stand reviewing the Wehrmacht for his 50th birthday celebrations on 20 April 1939; Mason-MacFarlane's apartment window was no more than 100 yards from the reviewing stand. Lord Halifax, the Foreign Secretary, said "We have not reached that stage... when we have to use assassination as a substitute for diplomacy." Hitler for his part regarded Mason-MacFarlane as a personal enemy. To try to resolve the Danzig crisis, in May 1939, Pope Pius XII sent the Papal Nunico to Germany, Monsignor Cesare Orsenigo, to meet the Führer at Berchtesgaden to discuss a possible peaceful resolution to the crisis. Hitler told Orsenigo that he had no quarrel with Poland, and claimed that the chief trouble-maker in the world was Great Britain, which was "inciting" Poland against the Reich as the British had "incited the Negroes of Abyssina against Italy, the Reds against Franco, Chiang Kai-shek against Japan, Czechoslovakia against Germany" and even today Mason-MacFarlane was "inciting" trouble against him in Berlin. Hitler seems to have been referring to an incident just a few days before, where Mason-MacFarlane had very loudly stated at a party in Berlin attended by members of the German elite that Britain was committed to fighting against Germany's Machtpolitik (power politics), and if Germany wanted war, she would get it. General Gerhard von Schwerin, seeing Mason-MacFarlane's remarks as a way to persuade Hitler not to launch a "premature" war in 1939, met him to ask if he was speaking on behalf of himself or the British government. However, Schwerin offended "Mason-Mac" with his question, which he regarded as questioning his honour as an officer, and the meeting ended badly.

In late May 1939, Mason-MacFarlane was recalled from Berlin and promoted to the rank of Brigadier-General of Royal Artillery at Aldershot. By this time, he had ceased to be a source of information about Germany and more of an advocate of the particular policies he wanted Britain to follow, as he ventured into grand strategy, stating what policies he favoured as the best way of defeating Germany. The Canadian historian Wesley Wark wrote: " Mason-Macfarlane represents the extreme case of a military attache who abandoned the uses of ambiguity in favour of single-minded and reductive reporting that made no effort to balance the strengths and weaknesses inherent in a military situation, or the gains and losses implied by a British response...He was influential, as we have seen, in the British decision not to back Czechoslovakia at the height of the Munich Crisis. He was equally influential in the British decision to support Poland and create an Eastern Front on her borders in March 1939. An Eastern Front designed to deter Hitler, based on Czechoslovakia and with the possibility of Russian assistance, had some chance of success. Such a front based on Poland and without Russian participation had none whatsoever".

== Second World War ==
Appointed a Companion of the Order of the Bath in the 1939 New Year Honours, Mason-MacFarlane was Director of Military Intelligence with the British Expeditionary Force (BEF) in 1939–40 and during the Battle of Dunkirk was operational commander of "Mac Force," an improvised formation covering the British right flank. For his services, he was awarded the Distinguished Service Order.

From July 1940 to March 1941, during the Second World War, Mason-Macfarlane was second-in-command of Gibraltar City and Garrison. This position allowed him to head the Joint Intelligence Centre. He was the head of a joint group of British Army, Royal Navy and Royal Air Force personnel whose role it would be to support General Franco if Spain were to be invaded by Germany. They were to assist the Spanish defence and, if the Spanish did not resist, then they were to create maximum damage.

Mason-MacFarlane briefly served as General Officer Commanding (GOC) of the 44th (Home Counties) Division, a Territorial Army (TA) formation, from April to June 1941, before being appointed Head of the British Military Mission in Moscow, shortly after the German invasion of the Soviet Union. Appointed on 24 June 1941 and arriving in Moscow on 14 July 1941 to be greeted as a guest of honour by Joseph Stalin at the Kremlin, Mason-MacFarlane had great hopes of Anglo-Soviet cooperation, which were soon dashed as he learned that the xenophobic Soviet regime regarded him as a spy. Unlike the other British generals who expected the Soviet Union to collapse in the summer or autumn of 1941, Mason-MacFarlane had a higher opinion of the Red Army and consistently predicted that the Soviets would hold out. "Mason-Mac" described the morale of ordinary Russians as high, reporting to London that they were just as committed to victory as ordinary British people. Though relations with his Soviet counterparts were difficult, Mason-MacFarlane found ordinary Russians friendlier and he worked hard to assist the Soviets. He played a crucial role in negotiating the transfer of the so-called Anders' Army, made up of the surviving Polish POWs taken prisoner by the Red Army in 1939, who in March 1942 crossed over from the Soviet Union to Iran and from there travelled on to join the British 8th Army.

Mason-MacFarlane was Governor of Gibraltar from 31 May 1942 to 14 February 1944, and witnessed the air crash there on 4 July 1943, which took the life of his friend the Polish Prime Minister Władysław Sikorski. Advanced to Knight Commander of the Order of the Bath in August 1943, Mason-MacFarlane was appointed a Commander of the Legion of Merit by the United States government the same month and made a Grand Cross of the Polish Order of Polonia Restituta in October.

Mason-MacFarlane served as Chief Commissioner of the Allied Control Commission (ACC) for Italy in 1944, effectively head of the interim post-war government. The other commissioners on the ACC were Harold Macmillan, Robert Daniel Murphy, René Massigli and Andrey Vyshinsky. Mason-MacFarlane's relations with King Victor Emmanuel III of Italy were difficult with the King flying into a rage at their first meeting because he was wearing shorts and shirt sleeves, a choice of attire the King found disrespectful. In response to the King's demand that he came back wearing the full ceremonial uniform of a British Army general, Mason-MacFarlane stated as a British Army general that he was not subject to the authority of Italy and would wear whatever clothing he liked. In January 1944, he recommend that the Allies force King Victor Emmanuel III, who was extremely unpopular with the Italian people, to abdicate in favour of his son Crown Prince Umberto. Both the US President Franklin D. Roosevelt and even more so the British Prime Minister Winston Churchill did not wish to press too strongly for the King to abdicate on the grounds that he still commanded the loyalty of what was left of the Italian armed forces.

In January 1944, the British psychologist I.G. Greenfield went to Bari to set up a radio station broadcasting anti-Nazi propaganda into German-occupied Italy and during his time in Bari, attended the Congress of Bari organised by the six main Italian political parties despite the fact that, as a civilian, this was illegal. Attending the congress, Greenfield was struck by how the prospect of "liberation filled us with hope" and that the people attending the congress all felt the end of Fascism not just in Italy but all over the world "meant the beginning of a new and better world in which democratic values would reign triumphant". For attending the Congress of Bari, Greenfield was arrested by the British military police and brought before Mason-MacFarlane who asked him to explain himself. After Greenfield talked about the optimistic mood at the congress of Bari, Mason-MacFarlane smiled, said he "would had done the same thing", and told Greenfield that no charges would be pressed against him. Greenfield who had been expecting "Mason-Mac" to be a conservative was surprised to find that for a British general he was a "remarkably liberal-minded man" who had much sympathy with the hopes of ordinary people for a better world after the war.

The United States and the United Kingdom favoured different policies for Italy with the Americans preferring social reforms and a republic while the British opposed reforms and wanted to keep the monarchy. From February 1944 onward, Mason-MacFarlane increasingly aligned himself with the American viewpoint on Italy, writing in his reports to London that Italy desperately needed social reforms and that the old Italian ruling class was too morally compromised with Fascism to provide the necessary leadership, advice that did not sit well with Churchill. On 21 February 1944, the King told Mason-MacFarlane that because the ACC had ended censorship of the press this had "improperly" allowed the Italian press to place him in a situation where he was "to be openly discredited and attacked". The King very reluctantly agreed to allow Crown Prince Umberto to become the lieutenant general of the realm with all the powers of the King, but sought in exchange a promise that the ACC impose censorship of criticism of the House of Savoy, a demand that Mason-MacFarlane rejected outright.

When Victor Emmanuel appointed his son lieutenant general of the realm, he did so with bad grace, predicting that this would allow the Italian Communists to come to power on the grounds that his son was not qualified to exercise power. In a report of their last meeting, Mason-Macfarlane wrote that "the king seems to have tried to make mischief to the end". In June 1944, after the Allies liberated Rome, to prevent the emergence of a rival government in Italy, it was agreed that representatives of the National Liberation Committee (Comitato di Liberazione Nazionale-CLN) should enter the cabinet of Prime Minister Pietro Badoglio, which proved to be a problem when the CLN demanded a new prime minister. Badoglio was a general who had loyally served Mussolini until he was made the scapegoat for the failed invasion of Greece in 1940, and because of Fascist associations, was unacceptable to the CLN. By letting the CLN leaders meet in Rome, instead of keeping them out of the Eternal City as Churchill wanted, Mason-MacFarlane was quite consciously setting the crisis in motion. To resolve the crisis, Mason-MacFarlane first went to the Grand Hotel where the Roman leaders of the CLN were staying and learned from them that the moderate socialist Ivanoe Bonomi was an acceptable choice as prime minister. He then went to the Quirinal Palace to persuade Umberto to sacrifice Badoglio for the sake of national unity, and to appoint Bonomi as his successor. As a result, Umberto dismissed Badoglio and appointed Bonomi prime minister. The only concessions Mason-MacFarlane imposed on Umberto was that he vetoed the republican Count Carlo Sforza from joining the Bonomi cabinet as foreign minister and insisted that the service ministries be headed by service officers instead of civilians.

Cadogan wrote that Mason-MacFarlane had failed grievously in his duties, writing that he should have "put the brake on hard" and told the CLN leaders that they had to accept Badoglio as prime minister. Churchill who wanted Badoglio to continue as a prime minister, was furious when he learned that he had been sacked and he in his turn sacked Mason-MacFarlane as chief of the ACC. Churchill initially tried to restore Badoglio as prime minister, writing in a telegram to Stalin, seeking his support: "Since when have we admitted the right of Italians to form any government they please?" From Rome, Macmillan reported to Churchill that it was impossible "to put Humpty Dumpty in his place again after our officers, MacFarlane and Sir Noel Charles have allowed him to tumble off again". Roosevelt, who had long been uncomfortable with Badoglio as prime minister, backed Mason-MacFarlane with the president sending the prime minister a telegram on 15 June 1944 saying it would be a "grave mistake" for the Allies to try to reimpose Badoglio given the fact that the vast majority of Italians did not want him as their prime minister. Given that the United States backed Bonomi as prime minister, Churchill had no choice but to accept him as prime minister. Churchill blamed Mason-MacFarlane for the appointment of Bonomi, saying he would prevent him holding "any post of the slightest military or political responsibility" again. Mason-MacFarlane's decision to run as a Labour Party candidate in the 1945 election was related to his anger over the way Churchill had treated him in 1944.

The nature of Mason-MacFarlane's disagreements with Churchill came out most clearly in his post-war manuscript "Draft Notes on Chapter 18 of Badoglio's Italy in the Second World War". In the "Draft Notes", Mason-MacFarlane wrote that virtually everything Badoglio wrote in his memoirs was a lie, and argued, contra Churchill, that Badoglio was such a discredited figure in Italy that any government headed by him was morally illegitimate to the Italian people. He argued that the best hope of establishing a democracy in Italy was to appoint as prime minister someone like Bonomi who was not associated with the Fascist regime. On the whole, he was very critical of Churchill's approach in seeing the Italian monarchy and the continuation of the traditional elites in Italy as the best way of stopping the Italian Communist Party from coming to power after the war, writing that institutions require moral legitimacy to be accepted by the people, and the way in which Victor Emmanuel had associated with Fascism deprived the Italian Crown of its legitimacy.

== Politics and later life ==
At the 1945 general election, Mason-MacFarlane was elected as a Labour Member of Parliament for Paddington North, defeating Winston Churchill's close ally, Brendan Bracken. He left Parliament due to ill-health on 22 October 1946.

It was reported in Time magazine on 24 August 1953 that "one of Britain's ablest soldier-administrators" had died of arthritis and complications from a broken leg. Mason-MacFarlane's papers and correspondence are archived in the Imperial War Museum's Department of Documents.

== In popular culture ==
The 2016 novel Midnight in Berlin by James McManus features as its hero Colonel Noel Macrae, "a thinly disguised and heavily romanticized version" of Mason-MacFarlane.

== Bibliography ==
- Mead, Richard (2007). Churchill's Lions: a biographical guide to the key British generals of World War II. Stroud (UK): Spellmount. ISBN 978-1-86227-431-0.
- Smart, Nick (2005). Biographical Dictionary of British Generals of the Second World War. Barnesley: Pen & Sword. ISBN 1-84415-049-6.
- Butler, Ewan N. (1972). Mason-Mac: The Life of Lieutenant-General Sir Noel Mason-Macfarlane. London: Macmillan. ISBN 0-333-11475-2.
- Strang, Bruce (March 1994). "Two Unequal Tempers: Sir George Ogilvie-Forbes, Sir Neville Henderson and British Foreign Policy, 1938–39". Diplomacy and Statecraft. 5 (4): 107–137. doi:10.1080/09592299408405911.
- Strang, Bruce (October 1996). "Once More unto the Breach: Britain's Guarantee to Poland, March 1939". The Journal of Contemporary History. 31 (4): 721–752. doi:10.1177/002200949603100406. S2CID 159558319.
- Wark, Wesley (November 1987). "Three Military Attachés at Berlin in the 1930s: Soldier-Statesmen and the Limits of Ambiguity". The International History Review. 9 (4): 586–611. doi:10.1080/07075332.1987.9640460.

Military offices
Preceded by Arthur Percival	GOC 44th (Home Counties) Infantry Division; April–June 1941	Succeeded by Brian Horrocks
Government offices
Preceded by The Viscount Gort	Governor of Gibraltar; 1942–1944	Succeeded by Sir Ralph Eastwood
Parliament of the United Kingdom
Preceded by Brendan Bracken	Member of Parliament for Paddington North; 1945–1946	Succeeded by Bill Field
