= 1969 Paddington North by-election =

UK parliamentary by-election

The 1969 Paddington North by-election was a by-election to the House of Commons for the constituency of Paddington North. It was necessitated by the death of sitting MP Ben Parkin.

Parkin had been on the left of the party and was part of a delegation of Labour MPs who met Joseph Stalin in 1947; when he voted against the Ireland Bill, he was warned by the Chief Whip about his conduct.

The result was a hold for the Labour Party.

By-election on 30 October 1969: Paddington North
Party	Candidate	Votes	%	±%
Labour	Arthur Latham	7,969	51.7	−6.7
Conservative	Richard Price	7,452	48.3	+16.0
Majority		517	3.4	−22.7
Turnout		15,421	46.3	−20.1
Labour hold		Swing		

== Previous election ==
General election 1966: Paddington North
Party	Candidate	Votes	%	±%
Labour	Ben Parkin	14,445	58.4	+0.5
Conservative	John Macdonald	7,981	32.3	−9.8
Liberal	David Griffiths	2,287	9.3	New
Majority		6,464	26.1	+10.3
Turnout		24,713	66.4	+1.3
Labour hold		Swing		
