= Edmund Routledge =

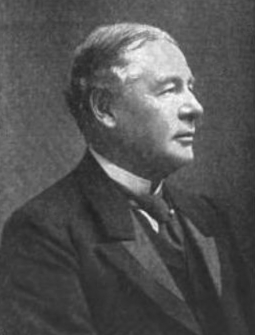
- In The Sketch, 1896
- Born: 30 January 1843; London, England
- Died: 25 August 1899 (aged 56); London, England
- Occupation: Publisher
- Political party: Liberal; Progressive
- Spouse: Martha Stephenson (m. 1865)
- Children: 8

Edmund Routledge (30 January 1843 – 25 August 1899) was a British publisher of boys' magazines and an author of books about sports.

== Early life ==
Edmund Routledge was born in London on 30 January 1843, the second son of George Routledge (1812–1888), the founder of the publishing house Routledge.

== Career ==
=== Publishing ===
Routledge started with his father's publishing house in 1859. He founded and edited the magazines The Broadway, one of the earliest sixpenny monthly magazines, and Every Boy's Magazine.

In 1865 Frederick Warne left Routledge, Warne, & Routledge (with rights to some of its titles) and established Frederick Warne & Co. Younger son Edmund became a Routledge partner in July, and the company then became George Routledge & Sons.

=== Politics ===
In 1886, he stood as the Liberal Party candidate for Parliament for Kensington North, but came second to the incumbent, Sir Roper Lethbridge for the Conservative Party.

In 1887, he stood as the Liberal candidate for Parliament for Paddington North in a by-election, but came second to Sir John Aird, 1st Baronet for the Conservatives.

From 1889 to 1895, he was a member of the London County Council for the Progressive Party.

== Selected publications ==
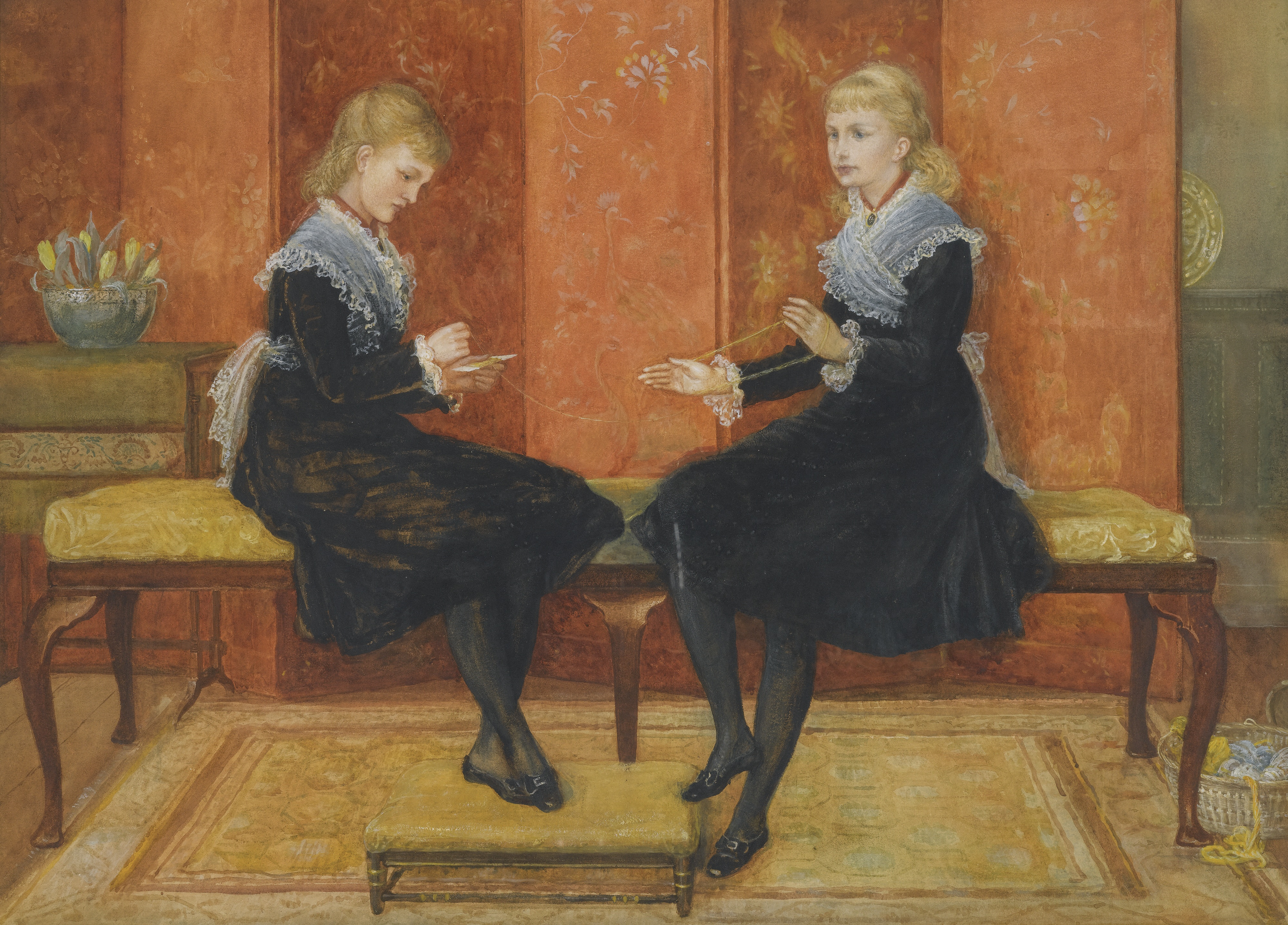
Routledge's daughters Violet and Lily, painted by Walter Crane

- Routledge's Dramatic Readings, 196 pages

== Personal life ==
In 1865, he married Martha Stephenson.

On 25 August 1899, he died of a heart attack at Queen Ann's Mansions, London, leaving five sons and three daughters. He is buried at Kensal Green Cemetery, London.
