= Encyclopedia of Ethics =

Scholarly work focused on ethical theory

The Encyclopedia of Ethics is a scholarly work with the original focus on ethical theory. It is published by Routledge and includes "biographical articles, entries on areas and issues related to ethics, treatment of major traditions in religious ethics, coverage of applied ethical issues of importance to theory, survey articles on the history of ethics, and information on the current status of philosophical ethics worldwide."

The editors in chief of the three-volume second edition of this Encyclopedia are Lawrence C. Becker and Charlotte B. Becker.

== See also ==
- Routledge Encyclopedia of Philosophy
