= Routledge =

English multinational academic publisher

- Parent company: Taylor & Francis
- Status: Active
- Founded: 1851; 175 years ago
- Founder: George Routledge
- Country of origin: England
- Headquarters location: Milton Park, Abingdon-on-Thames, Oxfordshire, England, UK
- Distribution: Worldwide
- Key people: Jeremy North (MD Books)
- Publication types: Books and academic journals
- Nonfiction topics: Humanities, social science, behavioral science, education, law
- Official website: routledge.com

Routledge (/ˈraʊtlɪdʒ/ ROWT-lij) is an English multinational publisher. It was founded in 1836 by George Routledge, and specialises in providing academic books, journals and online resources in the fields of the humanities, behavioural science, education, law, and social science. The company publishes approximately 1,800 journals and 5,000 new books each year, and its backlist encompasses over 140,000 titles. Routledge is claimed to be the largest global academic publisher within the humanities and social sciences.

In 1998, Routledge became a subdivision and imprint of its former rival, Taylor & Francis Group (T&F), as a result of a £90 million acquisition deal from Cinven, a venture capital group that had purchased it two years previously for £25 million. Following the merger of Informa and T&F in 2004, Routledge became a publishing unit and major imprint within the Informa "academic publishing" division. Routledge is headquartered in the main T&F office at Milton Park in Abingdon, Oxfordshire; it also operates from T&F offices globally, including in Philadelphia, Melbourne, New Delhi, Singapore, Tokyo, Beijing and Taipei.

== History ==
The firm originated in 1836, when the London bookseller George Routledge published an unsuccessful guidebook, The Beauties of Gilsland, with his brother-in-law W. H. (William Henry) Warne as assistant. In 1848, the pair entered the booming market for selling inexpensive imprints of works of fiction to rail travellers, in the style of the German Tauchnitz family, which became known as the "Railway Library".

The growing use of railways made a success of the venture, and this eventually led to Routledge, along with Warne's brother Frederick Warne, founding the company George Routledge & Co. in 1851. In the following year the company gained lucrative business through selling reprints of Uncle Tom's Cabin (which was in the public domain in the UK), which in turn enabled it to pay author Edward Bulwer-Lytton £20,000 for a 10-year lease allowing sole rights to print all 35 of his works including 19 of his novels to be sold cheaply as part of their "Railway Library" series.

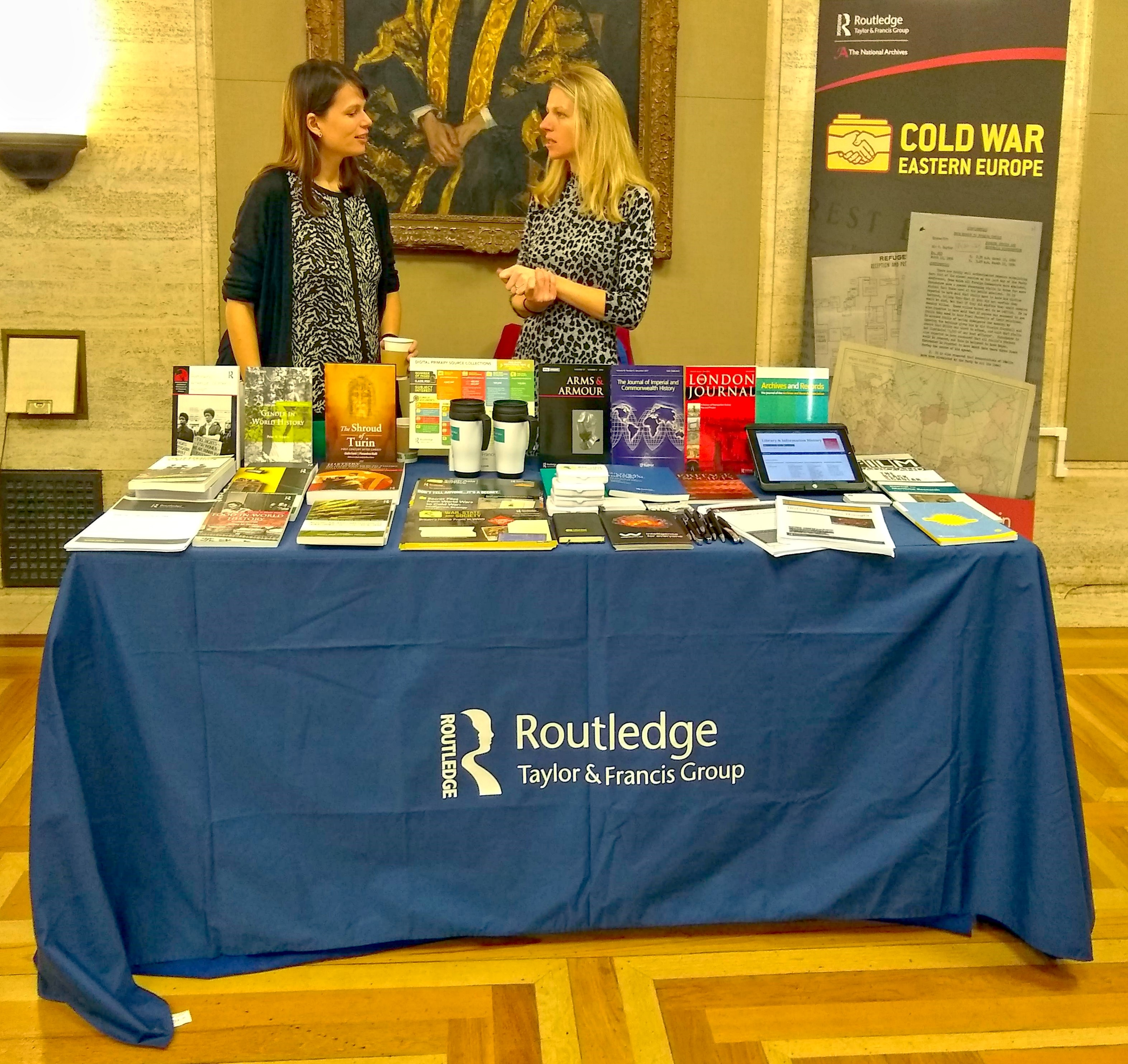
The Routledge stand at Senate House History Day 2018

The company was restyled in 1858 as Routledge, Warne & Routledge when George Routledge's son, Robert Warne Routledge, entered the partnership. Frederick Warne eventually left the company after the death of his brother W. H. Warne in May 1859. Gaining rights to some titles, he founded Frederick Warne & Co. in 1865, which became known for its Beatrix Potter books. In July 1865, George Routledge's son Edmund Routledge became a partner, and the firm became George Routledge & Sons.

By 1899, the company was running close to bankruptcy. However, following a successful restructuring in 1902 by scientist Sir William Crookes, banker Arthur Ellis Franklin, managing director William Swan Sonnenschein and others, it was able to recover and began to acquire and merge with other publishing companies, including J. C. Nimmo Ltd. in 1903. In 1912, the company took over the management of Kegan Paul, Trench, Trübner & Co., the descendant of companies founded by Charles Kegan Paul, Alexander Chenevix Trench, Nicholas Trübner, and George Redway.

These early 20th-century acquisitions brought with them lists of notable scholarly titles, and from 1912 onward, the company became increasingly concentrated in the academic and scholarly publishing business under the imprint "Kegan Paul Trench Trubner", as well as reference, fiction and mysticism. In 1947, George Routledge and Sons finally merged with Kegan Paul Trench Trubner (the umlaut had been quietly dropped in the First World War) under the name of Routledge & Kegan Paul. Using C. K. Ogden and later Karl Mannheim as advisers the company was soon particularly known for its titles in philosophy, psychology and the social sciences.

In 1985, Routledge & Kegan Paul joined with Associated Book Publishers (ABP), which was later acquired by International Thomson in 1987. Under Thomson's ownership, Routledge's name and operations were retained, with the additions of backlists from Methuen, Tavistock Publications, Croom Helm and Unwin Hyman. In 1996, a management buyout financed by the European private equity firm Cinven saw Routledge operating as an independent company once again. In 1997, Cinven acquired journals publisher Carfax and book publisher Spon. In 1998, Cinven and Routledge's directors accepted a deal for Routledge's acquisition by Taylor & Francis Group (T&F), with the Routledge name being retained as an imprint and subdivision.

In 2004, T&F became a division within Informa plc after a merger. Routledge continues as a primary publishing unit and imprint within Informa's 'academic publishing' division, publishing academic humanities and social science books, journals, reference works and digital products. Routledge has grown considerably as a result of organic growth and acquisitions of other publishing companies and other publishers' titles by its parent company. Humanities and social sciences titles acquired by T&F from other publishers are rebranded under the Routledge imprint.

Routledge is a signatory of the SDG Publishers Compact, and has taken steps to support the achievement of the Sustainable Development Goals (SDGs). These include achieving CarbonNeutral publication certification for their print books and journals, under the Natural Capital Partners' CarbonNeutral Protocol.

== People ==
The English publisher Fredric Warburg was a commissioning editor at Routledge during the early 20th century. Novelist Nina Stibbe, author of Love, Nina, worked at the company as a commissioning editor in the 1990s. Cultural studies editor William Germano served as vice-president and publishing director for two decades before becoming dean of the humanities at Cooper Union.

== Authors ==
Routledge has published works from Adorno, Bohm, Butler, Derrida, Einstein, Foucault, Freud, Al Gore, Hayek, Hoppe, Jung, Levi-Strauss, McLuhan, Malinowski, Marcuse, Popper, Johan Rockström, Russell, Sartre, and Wittgenstein. The republished works of some of these authors have appeared as part of the Routledge Classics and Routledge Great Minds series. Competitors to the series are Verso Books' Radical Thinkers, Penguin Classics, and Oxford World's Classics.

== Publications ==
Routledge has been criticised for a pricing structure which "will limit readership to the privileged few", as opposed to options for open access offered by DOAJ, Unpaywall, and DOAB.

=== Reference works ===
Taylor and Francis closed down the Routledge print encyclopaedia division in 2006. Some of its publications were:

- Routledge Encyclopedia of Philosophy, by Edward Craig (1998), in 10 volumes, but now online.
- Encyclopedia of Ethics, by Lawrence C. Becker and Charlotte B. Becker (2002), in three volumes.

Reference works by Europa Publications, published by Routledge:

- Europa World Year Book
- International Who's Who
- Europa World of Learning

Many of Routledge's reference works are published in print and electronic formats as Routledge Handbooks and have their own dedicated website: Routledge Handbooks Online. The company also publishes several online encyclopedias and collections of digital content such as Routledge Encyclopedia of Philosophy, Routledge Encyclopedia of Modernism, Routledge Performance Archive, and South Asia Archive.

Routledge Worlds series consisted of 66 books as of July 2023, which the publisher described as "magisterial surveys of key historical epochs". Included in the series are The Sikh World, The Pentecostal World, published in 2023, The Quaker World, The Ancient Israelite World, and The Sámi World published in 2022.

=== Book series ===
- The Broadway Travellers (1926–1937) edited by Eileen Power and Edward Denison Ross.
- Colloquial Series of Multimedia Language Courses
- Essential Grammars (since 1999)
- The Histories of Material Culture and Collecting, 1700-1950, edited by Stacey Pierson
  - "provides a forum for the broad study of object acquisition and collecting practices in their global dimensions from 1700 to 1950. The series seeks to illuminate the intersections between material culture studies, art history, and the history of collecting. It takes as its starting point the idea that objects both contributed to the formation of knowledge in the past and likewise contribute to our understanding of the past today."
- Morley's Universal Library (also known as: Routledge's Universal Library) (1883–1888)
- The Muses' Library (1904–1940; 1950–1980)
  - established in 1891 by Lawrence & Bullen as a series of fine editions of poetry until L&B folded in 1900, Routledge revived the series in 1904 with reprints and new titles. Over the years parallel editions were published in the US by Charles Scribner's Sons, E. P. Dutton and Harvard University Press.
- The Republic of Letters
- Routledge's Railway Library (1848–99)
  - were sold through W. H. Smith's bookstalls on railway platforms; in 50 years 1,277 books were published, most as pictorial hardbacks, with some bestsellers re-released as cheaper paperbacks. Authors included Edward Bulwer Lytton, James Fenimore Cooper, Jane Austen, Benjamin Disraeli, Henry Fielding, Frances Trollope, William Harrison Ainsworth, Alexandre Dumas, and Victor Hugo.
