= Bill Field =

British politician

Member of Parliament for Paddington North
- In office 1946–1953

Personal details
- Born: 22 May 1909
- Died: 11 October 2002 (aged 93)
- Party: Labour
- Education: University of London
- Military career
- Allegiance: United Kingdom
- Branch: Army Service Corps; Intelligence Corps
- Conflicts: World War II

William James Field (22 May 1909 – 11 October 2002) was a British politician whose career was ended by a conviction for "importuning for immoral purposes" in 1953. He was Labour Member of Parliament for Paddington North from 1946 to 1953.

== Early life ==
Field was the son of a solicitor and grew up in south-west London. He was educated at Richmond County School, then attended the University of London where he took an active part in student politics, opposing appeasement of Germany.

On the outbreak of World War II, he enlisted in the Royal Army Service Corps and later served in the Intelligence Corps.

At the end of the war, Field was demobilised swiftly as he had been selected as Labour Party candidate for Hampstead; in the Labour landslide election of 1945, Field reduced a Conservative majority of over 20,000 to 1,638.

== Political career ==
Later that year Field was elected to Hammersmith Borough Council. He swiftly became the dominant figure and was made council leader the following year. He was also selected to follow Sir Noel Mason-Macfarlane as Labour candidate for Paddington North following Mason-Macfarlane's resignation for ill-health reasons, and retained the seat. He improved his majority against the national trend in the 1950 general election, and was appointed as Parliamentary Private Secretary to Michael Stewart and John Strachey.

In opposition after October 1951, Field was highly regarded and thought likely to be appointed as a Minister if a Labour government were formed.

== Downfall ==
In 1953, Field was spotted by a policeman acting suspiciously in public lavatories in the West End of London. The officer arrested him for "importuning for immoral purposes", an offence which meant seeking out homosexual partners. Field gave his occupation as biochemist and pleaded guilty, but when the press discovered his real job and reported the case, he changed his plea to not guilty.

Field was convicted on one charge and fined £15. He immediately appealed, with his defence led by the Conservative MP John Maude who was reported to have given his services free. Maude was a spirited advocate for his cause, accusing the policeman involved of having committed perjury. However, Maude could not persuade the Appeal Court and the conviction was upheld. Field then resigned his seat and moved from London. He declined to give his new address to Who's Who.

== Later life ==
Field moved to Fontmell Magna in Dorset. He followed his academic interest in Egyptology; he was a lecturer at the University of the Third Age until his death in 2002 aged 93.

Parliament of the United Kingdom
Preceded by Noel Mason-MacFarlane	Member of Parliament for Paddington North; 1946–1953	Succeeded by Ben Parkin
