= 1946 Paddington North by-election =

UK Parliamentary by-election

The 1946 Paddington North by-election was held on 20 November 1946. The byelection was held due to the resignation of the incumbent Labour MP, Noel Mason-MacFarlane. It was won by the Labour candidate Bill Field.

Paddington North by-election, 1946
Party	Candidate	Votes	%	±%
Labour	Bill Field	13,082	55.6	−5.6
Conservative	Lawrence Turner	10,165	43.2	+6.1
Socialist (GB)	Clifford Groves	286	1.2	−0.5
Majority		2,917	12.4	−11.7
Turnout		23,533	53.9	−17.1
Labour hold		Swing		
