= Lawrence C. Becker =

American philosopher (1939–2018)

Lawrence C. Becker (April 26, 1939 – November 22, 2018) was an American philosopher working mainly in the areas of ethics and social, political, and legal philosophy.

== Work ==
Becker wrote books and journal articles on justice, Stoicism and Modern Stoicism, reciprocity, property rights, and metaethics. He was an associate editor of the journal Ethics from 1985 to 2000, and the editor, with the librarian Charlotte B. Becker, of two editions of the Encyclopedia of Ethics.

He was a Fellow of Hollins University, where he taught philosophy from 1965 to 1989, and was the William R. Kenan, Jr. Professor in the Humanities and Philosophy at the College of William & Mary from 1989 to 2001, subsequently retiring as professor emeritus.

From 2000 to 2011 he was on the volunteer Board of Directors of Post-Polio Health International, and served as its president and chair from 2006 to 2009.

== Books authored ==
- Habilitation, Health, and Agency: a Framework for Basic Justice. New York: Oxford University Press, 2012. E-book, 2013.
- A New Stoicism. Princeton: Princeton University Press, 1998.
  - Paperback issued by Princeton University Press, 1999.
  - E-book, 2010.
  - Revised Edition, 2017.
- Reciprocity. London and New York: Routledge, 1986. Pbk issued by the University of Chicago Press, 1990. Reissued by Routledge in hbk and e-book, 2014.
- Property Rights: Philosophic Foundations. London and New York, Routledge & Kegan Paul, 1977. Pbk, 1980. Reissued by Routledge in hbk and e-book, 2014.
- On Justifying Moral Judgments. London: Routledge & Kegan Paul, 1973. Reissued by Routledge in hbk and e-book, 2014.

== Books edited with Charlotte B. Becker ==
- Encyclopedia of Ethics. Second edition in three volumes. New York: Routledge, 2001. (First Edition in 2 volumes: New York: Garland Publishing, 1992.)
- A History of Western Ethics. Second Edition, revised with expanded index and glossary. New York: Routledge, 2003. (First Edition, New York: Garland Publishing, 1992).

== Book edited with Kenneth Kipnis ==
- Property: Cases, Concepts, and Critiques. Englewood Cliffs, New Jersey: Prentice-Hall, 1984.

== General editor for book series ==
- Ethical Investigations: A Routledge Series of Article Collections. New York: Routledge, 2003. Two collections (6 vols. each) of classic journal articles. Carl Wellman, ed., Rights and Duties; Peter Vallentyne, ed., Equality and Justice.

== See also ==
- List of American philosophers
- Encyclopedia of Ethics
- International Ventilator Users Network
- Reciprocity (social and political philosophy)
- Stoicism
