= Stroud District Council elections =

Local government elections in Gloucestershire, England

Stroud District Council in Gloucestershire, England is elected every four years. The all-out elections every four years began in 2016; up to and including the 2015 election one third of the council was elected each year, followed by one year without election.

== Election results ==
Composition of the council
Year	Conservative	Labour	Liberal Democrats (Note: Includes totals for the predecessors of the Liberal Democrats, the Liberal Party and SDP (both of which participated in the Alliance).)	Green (Note: Includes totals for the predecessors of the Green Party of England and Wales, the Ecology Party and Green Party UK.)	Independents & Others	Council control after election
Local government reorganisation; council established (56 seats)
1973	16	14	9	–	17	No overall control
1976	33'	9	4	0	10	Conservative
1979	29	9	6	0	12	Conservative
New ward boundaries (56 seats)
1983	30	7	6	0	13	Conservative
1984	28	9	9	0	10	No overall control
1986	23	11	13	1	8	No overall control
1987	23	9	15	1	8	No overall control
1988	22	12	12	3	7	No overall control
1990	17	18	10	4	7	No overall control
New ward boundaries (55 seats)
1991	15	19	12	6	6	No overall control
1992	22	16	9	6	2	No overall control
1994	17	14	13	6	5	No overall control
1995	14	19	12	5	5	No overall control
1996	7	27	11	4	6	No overall control
1998	10	26	9	4	6	No overall control
1999	17	24	5	4	5	No overall control
2000	24	18	5	4	4	No overall control
New ward boundaries (51 seats)
2002	29	12	4	4	2	Conservative
2003	28	10	6	4	3	Conservative
2004	27	11	6	4	3	Conservative
2006	29	9	5	5	3	Conservative
2007	31	9	4	5	2	Conservative
2008	31	7	5	6	2	Conservative
2010	30	7	7	6	1	Conservative
2011	25	11	6	6	3	No overall control
2012	21	16	6	5	3	No overall control
2014	22	20	2	5	2	No overall control
2015	23	18	3	6	2	No overall control
New ward boundaries (51 seats) (Note: Changed from one-third to whole council elections.)
2016	23	18	2	8	0	No overall control
2021	20	15	3	13	0	No overall control
2024	7	20	2	22	0	No overall control

== District result maps ==
2002 results map

2003 results map

2004 results map

2006 results map

2007 results map

2008 results map

2010 results map

2011 results map

2012 results map

2014 results map

2015 results map

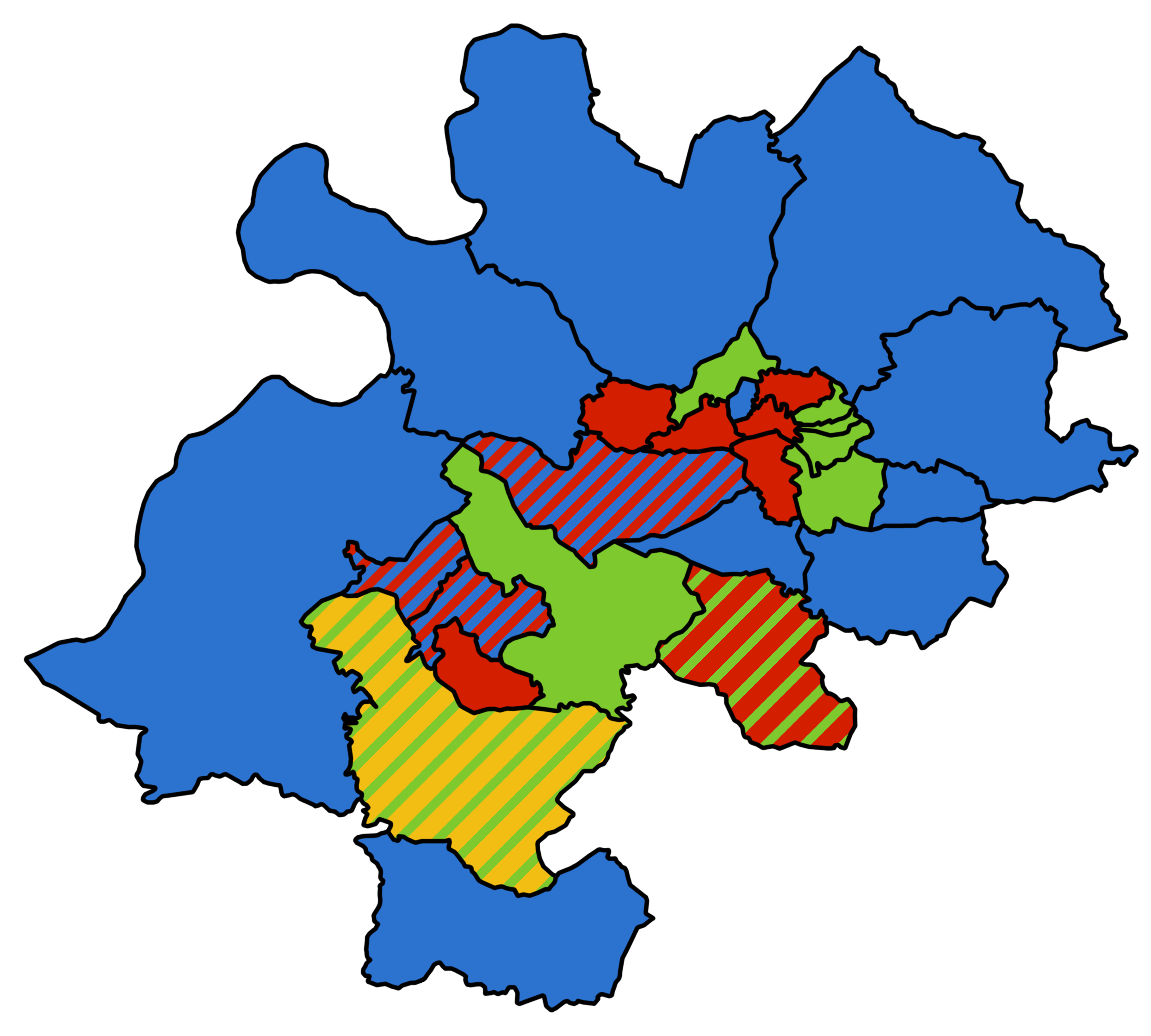
2016 results map

2021 results map

2024 results map

== By-election results ==
=== 1994–1998 ===
Whiteshill by-election 27 June 1996
Party	Candidate	Votes	%	±%
Labour		308	55.2	
Liberal Democrats		250	44.8	
Majority		58	10.4	
Turnout		558		
Labour gain from Liberal Democrats		Swing		

Cains Cross by-election 26 September 1996
Party	Candidate	Votes	%	±%
Labour		857	55.8	
Liberal Democrats		272	17.7	
Conservative		240	15.6	
Green		167	10.8	
Majority		585	381	
Turnout		1,536		
Labour hold		Swing		

=== 1998–2002 ===
Nibley by-election 30 November 2000
Party	Candidate	Votes	%	±%
Conservative		275	60.3	+35.5
Liberal Democrats		159	34.9	−19.7
Labour		22	4.8	−15.8
Majority		116	25.4	
Turnout		456	46.0	
Conservative gain from Liberal Democrats		Swing		

Wotton by-election 7 June 2001
Party	Candidate	Votes	%	±%
Liberal Democrats		1,319	35.4	+9.5
Conservative		1,308	35.1	+4.0
Labour		1,163	29.6	+5.6
Majority		11	0.3	
Turnout		3,790	67.8	
Liberal Democrats hold		Swing		

=== 2002–2006 ===
Dursley by-election 7 November 2002
Party	Candidate	Votes	%	±%
Conservative	Tim Frankau	652	39.7	+3.2
Liberal Democrats	Brian Marsh	609	37.1	+8.1
Labour	Paul Denney	382	23.2	−11.3
Majority		43	2.6	
Turnout		1,643	35.8	
Conservative hold		Swing		

Cainscross by-election 30 June 2005
Party	Candidate	Votes	%	±%
Labour	Andrew Treacher	652	43.4	+4.7
Conservative	Linda Jeffreys	425	28.3	+0.0
Liberal Democrats	John Bowen	257	17.1	−4.1
Green	Helen Royall	169	11.2	−0.6
Majority		227	15.1	
Turnout		1,503	28.9	
Labour hold		Swing		

=== 2006–2010 ===
Cainscross by-election 16 November 2006
Party	Candidate	Votes	%	±%
Labour	Thomas Williams	489	43.1	+6.9
Conservative	Linda Jeffreys	407	35.9	+3.1
Liberal Democrats	Darren Jones	238	21.0	+8.5
Majority		82	7.2	
Turnout		1,134	22.1	
Labour hold		Swing		

Nailsworth by-election 30 August 2007
Party	Candidate	Votes	%	±%
Conservative	Rowland Blackwell	857	44.5	+6.1
Green	Chris Harmer	810	42.0	+4.1
Labour	Jo Smith	261	13.5	+0.2
Majority		47	2.5	
Turnout		1,928	38.0	
Conservative hold		Swing		

=== 2010–2014 ===
Amberley and Woodchester by-election 3 February 2011
Party	Candidate	Votes	%	±%
Conservative	Margaret Wigzell	366	54.9	+0.5
Labour	Audrey Smith	177	26.5	+10.8
Liberal Democrats	Adrian Walker-Smith	124	18.6	+6.8
Majority		189	28.3	
Turnout		667	38.8	
Conservative hold		Swing		

Cam East by-election 2 May 2013
Party	Candidate	Votes	%	±%
Labour	Miranda Clifton	654	53.2	+6.0
Conservative	Loraine Patrick	575	46.8	−6.0
Majority		79	6.4	
Turnout		1,229		
Labour gain from Conservative		Swing		

=== 2014–2016 ===
Valley by-election 7 August 2014
Party	Candidate	Votes	%	±%
Green	Martin Baxendale	291	42.8	−4.3
Labour	James Heslop	230	33.8	+2.3
UKIP	Stuart Love	76	11.2	+11.2
Conservative	Stephen Davies	67	9.9	−11.5
TUSC	Lucy Roberts	16	2.4	+2.4
Majority		61	9.0	
Turnout		680		
Green hold		Swing		

=== 2016–2021 ===
Chalford by-election 23 November 2017
Party	Candidate	Votes	%	±%
Conservative	Darren Loftus	751	45.1	+12.9
Labour	Karen Pitney	427	25.6	−2.0
Green	Robin Lewis	341	20.5	−7.5
Liberal Democrats	Kris Beacham	146	8.8	+8.8
Majority		324	19.5	
Turnout		1,665		
Conservative hold		Swing		

Dursley by-election 15 November 2018
Party	Candidate	Votes	%	±%
Labour	Trevor Hall	889	50.5	+13.5
Conservative	Loraine Patrick	704	40.0	+15.3
Green	Yvon Dignon	90	5.1	−9.1
Liberal Democrats	Richard Blackwell-Whitehead	79	4.5	−19.5
Majority		185	10.5	
Turnout		1,762		
Labour hold		Swing		

Berkeley Vale by-election 28 February 2019
Party	Candidate	Votes	%	±%
Conservative	Lindsay Green	993	49.8	+4.6
Labour	Liz Ashton	686	34.4	+0.8
Liberal Democrats	Mike Stayte	231	11.6	−1.5
Green	Thomas Willetts	82	4.1	−3.9
Majority		307	15.4	
Turnout		1,992		
Conservative hold		Swing		

=== 2021–2024 ===
Painswick and Upton by-election 17 May 2023
Party	Candidate	Votes	%	±%
Green	Gary Luff	1,168	45.9	+11.9
Conservative	Sue Williams	817	32.1	−10.3
Liberal Democrats	Roz Savage	381	15.0	+15.0
Labour	Ela Pathak-Sen	180	7.1	−16.5
Majority		351	13.8	
Turnout		2,546		
Green gain from Conservative		Swing		

=== 2024–2028 ===
Stroud Central by-election 1 May 2025
Party	Candidate	Votes	%	±%
Green	Cate James-Hodges	416	56.3	
Labour	Shelley Rider	118	16.0	
Reform	Daryl Leslie Arthur Smith	108	14.6	
Conservative	Hena Mannan-Rahman	60	8.1	
Liberal Democrats	Philip James Purves	27	3.7	
UKIP	Lucian Aeris	10	1.4	
Majority		298	40.3	
Turnout		743	40.9	
Green gain from Labour				

Severn by-election 11 June 2025
Party	Candidate	Votes	%	±%
Green	Moya Shannon	439	27.8	
Conservative	Hena Mannan-Rahman	425	26.9	
Reform	Jonathan Wren	421	26.7	
Labour	Karen Frances Linforth	177	11.2	
Liberal Democrats	Mike Stayte	112	7.1	
UKIP	Ben Walker	5	0.3	
Majority		14	0.9	
Turnout		1579	26.8	
Green gain from Labour				

Thrupp by-election 5 March 2025
Party	Candidate	Votes	%	±%
Green	Helen Elliott-Boult	540	67.5	
Reform	Michael Rees	132	16.5	
Conservative	Anthony Pilkington	58	7.3	
Labour	Mick Fealty	46	5.8	
Liberal Democrats	Raffy Chiswick	22	2.8	
UKIP	Lucian Aeris	2	0.3	
Majority		408	51.0	
Turnout		800		
Green hold				

Kingswood by-election 2 September 2026
Party	Candidate	Votes	%	±%
Liberal Democrats	Fred Hulls	442	64.0	
Conservative	Louise Tandy	109	15.8	
Reform	Michael Rees	70	10.1	
Green	Alasdair Liddell	40	5.8	
Labour	Claire Cook	30	4.3	
Majority		333	48.2	
Turnout		691		
Liberal Democrats hold				

Rodborough by-election 13 October 2026
Party	Candidate	Votes	%	±%
Labour	John Bloxsom	697	47.0	
Green	Robin Layfield	470	31.7	
Reform	Gerald O'Brien	191	12.9	
Conservative	Christopher Easton	103	6.9	
Liberal Democrats	George James	23	1.5	
Majority		227	15.3	
Turnout		1,484		
Labour hold				
