= 2024 Stroud District Council election =

2024 local election in Stroud, England

- 2 May 2024

All 51 seats to Stroud District Council 26 seats needed for a majority

	First party	Second party
Leader	Catherine Braun	Steve Robinson
Party	Green	Labour
Last election	13 seats, 30.3%	15 seats, 25.8%
Seats before	15	4
Seats won	22	20
Seat change	▲9	▲5
Popular vote	15,652	12,422
Percentage	36.3%	28.8%
Swing	▲6.0%	▲2.0%
	Third party	Fourth party
Leader	Lindsey Green	Ken Tucker
Party	Conservative	Liberal Democrats
Last election	20 seats, 34.4%	3 seats, 7.2%
Seats before	19	3
Seats won	7	2
Seat change	▼13	▼1
Popular vote	9,575	4,190
Percentage	22.2%	9.7%
Swing	▼12.2%	▲2.5%
- Winner of each seat at the 2024 Stroud District Council election
Leader before election
Catherine Braun
Green
No overall control
Leader after election
Catherine Braun
Green
No overall control

The 2024 Stroud District Council election was held on Thursday 2 May 2024, alongside the other local elections in the United Kingdom being held on the same day. All 51 members of Stroud District Council in Gloucestershire were elected.

== Background ==
Prior to the election the council was under no overall control. The Conservatives were the largest party, but the council was being run by a coalition of the Green Party, Liberal Democrats and independent councillors, led by Catherine Braun of the Green Party.

At the previous election in 2021, the Conservatives won 20 seats (down 3) with 34.4% of the vote, Labour won 15 (down 3) with 25.8%, the Green Party won 13 (up 5) with 30.3%, and the Liberal Democrats won 3 (up 1) with 7.2%. Following the election, Doina Cornell of the Labour Party was elected council leader, with the backing of the Green Party and Liberal Democrats. Labour lost their position as the largest party in the coalition in June 2022, following the resignation of Cornell and 3 others from the party. Green Party councillor Catherine Braun was elected leader on 22 July 2022; the council is now run by a coalition of the Green Party, the Liberal Democrats, the Community Independents group, and the Independent Left group.

== Summary ==
Following the election, the council remained under no overall control, but the Greens overtook the Conservatives to become the largest party. Labour also made significant gains, whereas the Conservatives made significant losses and no independent councillors were elected. The Green subsequently formed a minority administration.

=== Council composition ===
After 2021 election		Before 2024 election		After 2024 election	
Party	Seats	Party	Seats	Party	Seats
Conservative	20	Conservative	19	Conservative	7
Green	13	Green	14	Green	22
Labour	15	Labour	4	Labour	20
Liberal Democrats	3	Liberal Democrats	3	Liberal Democrats	2
Independent	0	Independent	10	Independent	0

Changes:

- June 2022: Doina Cornell, Colin Fryer, Trevor Hall, and Robin Layfield leave Labour to sit as independents (Note: Cornell, Fryer, Hall, and Layfield were part of the Community Independents group on the council, which was not registered as a political party.)
- September 2022: Paula Baker, Natalie Bennett, Chris Brine, Helen Fenton, and Mattie Ross leave Labour to sit as independents (Note: Baker, Bennett, and Ross were part of the Independent Left group on the council, which was not registered as a political party.)
- April 2023: Jason Bullingham (Conservative) resigns; by-election held in May 2023
- May 2023: Gary Luff (Green Party) gains by-election from Conservatives
- June 2023: Laurie Davies leaves Labour to sit as an independent
- October 2023: Jessie Hoskin leaves Labour to sit as an independent (Note: Hoskin was part of the Independent Left group on the council, which was not registered as a political party.)
- December 2023: Norman Kay (Green Party) dies; seat left vacant until 2024 election
- February 2024: Helen Fenton (independent) joins Green Party

=== Election result ===
2024 Stroud District Council election
Party	Candidates	Seats	Gains	Losses	Net gain/loss	Seats %	Votes %	Votes	+/−
Green	51	22			▲9	43.1	36.3	15,652	▲6.0
Labour	51	20			▲5	39.2	28.8	12,422	▲2.0
Conservative	51	7			▼13	13.7	22.2	9,575	▼12.2
Liberal Democrats	20	2			▼1	3.9	9.7	4,190	▲2.5
Independent	5	0			Steady	0.0	2.4	1,034	▲1.6
TUSC	4	0			Steady	0.0	0.5	217	▲0.3

== Ward results ==
The Statement of Persons Nominated, which details the candidates standing in each ward, was released by Stroud District Council following the close of nominations on 5 April 2024.

=== Amberley & Woodchester ===
Amberley & Woodchester
Party	Candidate	Votes	%	±%
Green	Sarah Canning	420	47.9	N/A
Labour Co-op	Lesley Williams	267	30.4	−21.2
Conservative	Colin Chisholm	190	21.7	−26.7
Majority		153	17.5	
Turnout		884	50.46	
Registered electors		1,752		
Green gain from Labour		Swing		

=== Berkeley Vale ===
Berkeley Vale (3 seats)
Party	Candidate	Votes	%	±%
Conservative	Lindsey Green*	1,094	50.8	−3.4
Conservative	Paul Turner	935	43.4	−13.6
Conservative	Charles Tuffin	881	40.9	−6.3
Labour	Liz Ashton	876	40.7	+9.7
Labour	Steve Lydon	582	27.0	+10.7
Labour	Jo Smith	556	25.8	N/A
Green	Martyn Cutcher	250	11.6	−5.9
Green	Susie Medley	247	11.5	N/A
Liberal Democrats	Nick Easby	229	10.6	−4.3
Green	Bob Hilliard	224	10.4	N/A
Turnout		2,169	36.33	
Registered electors		5,970		
Conservative hold		Swing		
Conservative hold		Swing		
Conservative hold		Swing		

=== Bisley ===
Bisley
Party	Candidate	Votes	%	±%
Green	Martin Brown*	546	62.1	+8.5
Conservative	Stephen Davies	209	23.8	−22.6
Labour	Neil Hughes	80	9.1	N/A
Liberal Democrats	Rod Rhys Jones	44	5.0	N/A
Majority		337	38.3	
Turnout		882	49.55	
Registered electors		1,780		
Green hold		Swing		

=== Cainscross ===
Cainscross (3 seats)
Party	Candidate	Votes	%	±%
Labour	Elizabeth Stanley	989	48.0	+14.1
Labour	Dave Mathews	971	47.1	+13.7
Labour	Fraser Dahdouh	954	46.3	+17.8
Green	Kate Crews* (Note: Kate Crews was elected in 2021 as Councillor for Stroud Central)	630	30.6	+12.0
Green	Alan Mossman	428	20.8	+3.5
Green	Gavin McClafferty	413	20.0	+4.9
Conservative	George Williams	397	19.3	−9.2
Conservative	Donna Pickering	319	15.5	−14.8
Conservative	Adam Whitehead	311	15.1	−5.6
Independent	Charlie Mitchell	209	10.1	N/A
TUSC	Sue Richards	81	3.9	+2.1
Turnout		2,071	35.41	
Registered electors		5,848		
Labour gain from Independent				
Labour hold				
Labour gain from Conservative				

=== Cam East ===
Cam East (2 seats)
Party	Candidate	Votes	%	±%
Labour	Ian Hamilton	662	44.9	+17.8
Labour	Milly Hill	583	39.5	+15.6
Conservative	Brian Tipper*	513	34.8	−14.5
Conservative	Victoria Gray*	422	28.6	−15.9
Green	Anna Bonallack	209	14.2	N/A
Green	Steven Naumann	132	8.9	N/A
Liberal Democrats	Richard Wilsher	121	8.2	−9.3
Turnout		1,481	40.61	
Registered electors		3,647		
Labour gain from Conservative				
Labour gain from Conservative				

=== Cam West ===
Cam West (2 seats)
Party	Candidate	Votes	%	±%
Labour	Chris Haynes	590	46.6	+3.1
Labour	Terri Kinnison	528	41.7	+12.7
Conservative	Bridget Baxter	361	28.5	−5.8
Conservative	Christopher Evans*	345	27.3	−16.5
Green	Ben Bywater	238	18.8	N/A
Green	Sally Pickering	159	12.6	N/A
Liberal Democrats	Rhianna Wilsher	107	8.5	−2.1
Turnout		1,274	33.50	
Registered electors		3,803		
Labour gain from Conservative				
Labour gain from Independent				

=== Chalford ===
Chalford (3 seats)
Party	Candidate	Votes	%	±%
Green	Tricia Watson*	1,323	53.5	+3.5
Green	Helen Fenton* (Note: Helen Fenton was elected in 2021 as a Labour & Co-operative Councillor)	1,279	51.7	+15.3
Green	James Boyle	1,192	48.2	+1.2
Labour	Alex Hughes	624	25.2	−11.2
Labour	Jed Knight	605	24.5	N/A
Conservative	Gail Fearnley-Whittingstall	559	22.6	−11.7
Conservative	Tim Westlake	511	20.7	−12.4
Conservative	Kim Hawkins	504	20.4	−9.3
Labour	Stephen Stanley	504	20.4	N/A
Turnout		2,486	47.60	
Registered electors		5,223		
Green hold				
Green hold				
Green gain from Labour				

=== Coaley & Uley ===
Coaley & Uley
Party	Candidate	Votes	%	±%
Green	Martin Pearcy*	584	59.2	+4.1
Conservative	John Stanton	260	26.3	−18.6
Labour	Claire Cook	143	14.5	N/A
Majority		324	33.1	
Turnout		998	50.74	
Registered electors		1,967		
Green hold		Swing		

=== Dursley ===
Dursley (3 seats)
Party	Candidate	Votes	%	±%
Labour	Helen Caton Hughes	915	43.2	+0.3
Labour	Terry Cook	840	39.7	−2.1
Labour	Bob Hughes	802	37.9	+1.7
Green	Danae Savvidou	688	32.5	−3.7
Green	Tom Meadowcroft	557	26.3	+6.2
Conservative	Loraine Patrick*	549	25.9	−13.7
Conservative	Matt Patrick	480	22.7	−10.4
Conservative	Carwyn Williams	449	21.2	−9.4
Green	James Broady	417	19.7	+5.6
Liberal Democrats	Ann Blacklock	155	7.3	N/A
TUSC	Lucia Jayaseelan	45	2.1	N/A
Turnout		2,129	37.42	
Registered electors		5,689		
Labour gain from Independent				
Labour gain from Independent				
Labour gain from Conservative				

=== Hardwicke ===
Hardwicke (3 seats)
Party	Candidate	Votes	%	±%
Conservative	Gill Oxley*	858	44.9	−11.6
Conservative	Demelza Turner-Wilkes	724	37.9	−7.7
Conservative	Mark Ryder*	676	35.4	−4.7
Labour	Simon MacGregor	491	25.7	+0.7
Green	Adrian Oldman	458	24.0	−1.9
Labour	Keith Terry	420	22.0	N/A
Labour	Thomas Williams	415	21.7	N/A
Green	John Robinthwaite	380	19.9	−3.4
Green	John Patient	362	19.0	N/A
Liberal Democrats	Alexandra Owen	263	13.8	N/A
Turnout		1,922	27.59	
Registered electors		6,967		
Conservative hold				
Conservative hold				
Conservative hold				

=== Kingswood ===
Kingswood
Party	Candidate	Votes	%	±%
Liberal Democrats	Holly Simkiss	689	82.0	+23.1
Conservative	Allison Long	79	9.4	−23.1
Green	Hannah Lyons-Tsai	40	4.8	N/A
Labour	Val Randell	32	3.8	−4.8
Majority		610	72.6	
Turnout		843	45.77	
Registered electors		1,842		
Liberal Democrats hold		Swing		

=== Minchinhampton ===
Minchinhampton (2 seats)
Party	Candidate	Votes	%	±%
Green	Chloe Turner*	1,259	72.5	+13.8
Green	Gill Thomas	960	55.3	N/A
Conservative	Duncan Greenaway	306	17.6	−31.0
Liberal Democrats	Christo Archer	261	15.0	N/A
Conservative	Philip Morris	203	11.7	−10.0
Labour	Stephen Moore	173	10.0	−11.9
Labour	David Carter	148	8.5	N/A
Turnout		1,740	47.10	
Registered electors		3,694		
Green hold		Swing		
Green gain from Independent		Swing		

=== Nailsworth ===
Nailsworth (3 seats)
Party	Candidate	Votes	%	±%
Labour Co-op	Steve Robinson*	1,599	66.8	+8.0
Green	Kate Kay	985	41.1	−12.1
Labour Co-op	Maggie Dutton	942	39.3	−4.0
Labour Co-op	Shelley Rider	827	34.5	N/A
Green	Rod Nelson	614	25.6	N/A
Green	Rosie Thresher	434	18.1	N/A
Conservative	Ian Daniels	347	14.5	−12.4
Conservative	Tom George	329	13.7	−11.5
Conservative	Max Howells	327	13.7	−9.7
Liberal Democrats	Colleen Rothwell	185	7.7	−4.2
Liberal Democrats	Adam Cain	115	4.8	N/A
Turnout		2,412	45.72	
Registered electors		5,276		
Labour Co-op hold		Swing		
Green hold		Swing		
Labour Co-op gain from Independent		Swing		

=== Painswick & Upton ===
Painswick & Upton (3 seats)
Party	Candidate	Votes	%	±%
Green	Gary Luff*	1,492	58.0	+21.1
Green	Pete Kennedy	1,245	48.4	+11.5
Green	Matthew Sargeant	1,171	45.5	N/A
Conservative	David Castle	849	33.0	−13.1
Conservative	Tim Williams	807	31.4	−10.5
Conservative	David Lowin	737	28.7	−13.2
Labour	Anne Snelgrove	274	10.7	−15.0
Labour	Ashley Smith* (Note: Ashley Smith was elected in 2021 as Councillor for Amberley & Woodchester)	245	9.5	N/A
Liberal Democrats	Richard Osborn	239	9.3	N/A
Labour	Andrew Treacher	202	7.9	N/A
Turnout		2,587	43.09	
Registered electors		6,004		
Green hold		Swing		
Green gain from Conservative		Swing		
Green gain from Conservative		Swing		

=== Randwick, Whiteshill & Ruscombe ===
Randwick, Whiteshill & Ruscombe
Party	Candidate	Votes	%	±%
Green	Jon Edmunds*	613	74.0	+2.1
Conservative	Marcia Cosh	111	13.4	−14.7
Labour	Paul Sztumpf	65	7.9	N/A
Liberal Democrats	John Holmes	39	4.7	N/A
Majority		502	60.6	
Turnout		833	48.00	
Registered electors		1,737		
Green hold		Swing		

=== Rodborough ===
Rodborough (2 seats)
Party	Candidate	Votes	%	±%
Labour	Nigel Prenter*	602	34.5	+0.6
Labour	Katy Hofmann	576	33.0	−8.9
Green	Liz Hillary	539	30.9	+6.7
Green	Phil Blomberg	505	28.9	+3.1
Independent	Robin Layfield* (Note: Robin Layfield was elected in 2021 as a Labour & Co-operative Councillor)	450	25.8	−16.1
Independent	Helen Elliott-Boult	303	17.4	N/A
Conservative	Sarah Jones	193	11.1	−11.4
Conservative	Tom Whittaker	169	9.7	−8.7
Turnout		1,745	49.36	
Registered electors		3,535		
Labour hold		Swing		
Labour gain from Independent		Swing		

=== Severn ===
Severn (2 seats)
Party	Candidate	Votes	%	±%
Conservative	Robert Brown	706	37.3	−10.6
Labour Co-op	Richard Maisey	683	36.1	+8.2
Labour Co-op	Nathan Greenway	648	34.2	N/A
Conservative	Hena Mannan-Rahman	504	26.6	−19.2
Green	Moya Shannon	374	19.8	−3.2
Liberal Democrats	Mike Stayte	341	18.0	−1.8
Green	Isa Clee	276	14.6	N/A
Turnout		1,911	33.89	
Registered electors		5,638		
Conservative hold		Swing		
Labour Co-op gain from Conservative		Swing		

=== Stonehouse ===
Stonehouse (3 seats)
Party	Candidate	Votes	%	±%
Labour	John Callinan	749	40.4	+2.5
Labour	John Parker	723	39.0	+4.6
Green	Carol Kambites	661	35.6	+11.8
Labour	Karen Linforth	571	30.8	+0.2
Conservative	Nicholas Housden*	412	22.2	−13.4
Green	Madelaine Maraboli-Roman	393	21.2	−0.7
Conservative	Sonia Brinkworth	361	19.5	−10.1
Green	Rachel Smith	317	17.1	+3.2
Independent	Wendy Thomson	310	16.7	N/A
Conservative	Surjeet Malik	294	15.8	−9.9
Liberal Democrats	Robert Jewell	129	7.0	+2.4
TUSC	Adam Goulcher	45	2.4	+0.5
Turnout		1,868	32.01	
Registered electors		5,835		
Labour gain from Independent		Swing		
Labour gain from Independent		Swing		
Green gain from Conservative		Swing		

=== Stroud Central ===
Stroud Central
Party	Candidate	Votes	%	±%
Labour Co-op	David Drew	408	50.7	+14.2
Green	Cate James-Hodges	326	40.5	−0.7
Conservative	Susan Cursham	70	8.7	−13.6
Majority		82	10.2	
Turnout		814	44.68	
Registered electors		1,822		
Labour Co-op gain from Green		Swing		

=== Stroud Farmhill & Paganhill ===
Stroud Farmhill & Paganhill
Party	Candidate	Votes	%	±%
Labour	Shyama Ananthan	388	48.4	+7.8
Green	Val Saunders	309	38.5	+22.5
Conservative	Richard Silvey	105	13.1	−30.3
Majority		79	9.9	
Turnout		805	42.62	
Registered electors		1,889		
Labour gain from Conservative		Swing		

=== Stroud Slade ===
Stroud Slade
Party	Candidate	Votes	%	±%
Green	Natalie Rothwell-Warn	387	53.8	+13.2
Labour	Rachel Lyons	230	31.9	−11.1
Independent	Thea Pilikian	65	9.0	N/A
Conservative	Anthony Malpass	38	5.3	−9.3
Majority		157	21.9	
Turnout		725	40.26	
Registered electors		1,801		
Green gain from Labour		Swing		

=== Stroud Trinity ===
Stroud Trinity
Party	Candidate	Votes	%	±%
Green	Lucas Schoemaker*	485	60.2	+8.3
Labour	Andy Theaker	194	24.1	−7.6
Conservative	Sharon Sugars	52	6.5	−10.0
TUSC	Chris Moore	46	5.7	N/A
Liberal Democrats	Philip Purves	29	3.6	N/A
Majority		291	36.1	
Turnout		814	49.76	
Registered electors		1,636		
Green hold		Swing		

=== Stroud Uplands ===
Stroud Uplands
Party	Candidate	Votes	%	±%
Labour	Cath Moore	246	38.0	−5.8
Green	Sarah Dixon	184	28.4	−0.9
Liberal Democrats	George James	118	18.2	+14.5
Conservative	Jessica Tomblin	100	15.4	−7.0
Majority		62	9.6	
Turnout		657	39.94	
Registered electors		1,645		
Labour gain from Independent		Swing		

=== Stroud Valley ===
Stroud Valley
Party	Candidate	Votes	%	±%
Green	Martin Baxendale*	559	62.0	+16.4
Labour Co-op	Mick Fealty	293	32.5	−8.4
Conservative	Brian Lee	49	5.4	−8.1
Majority		266	29.5	
Turnout		906	52.28	
Registered electors		1,733		
Green hold		Swing		

=== The Stanleys ===
The Stanleys (2 seats)
Party	Candidate	Votes	%	±%
Green	Steve Hynd*	907	56.8	+18.1
Green	Marisa Godfrey	741	46.4	N/A
Conservative	Nigel Studdert-Kennedy*	437	27.3	−13.8
Labour	Jenny Miles	317	19.8	−8.8
Conservative	David White	226	14.1	−15.4
Labour	Julie Harper	203	12.7	−6.4
Liberal Democrats	Elaine Jewell	56	3.5	N/A
Turnout		1,608	42.89	
Registered electors		3,749		
Green hold				
Green gain from Independent				

=== Thrupp ===
Thrupp
Party	Candidate	Votes	%	±%
Green	Beki Aldam*	635	64.4	+1.4
Labour	Rod Beer	178	18.1	+7.0
Conservative	Charlie Stacey	173	17.5	−8.4
Majority		457	46.0	
Turnout		994	51.53	
Registered electors		1,929		
Green hold				

=== Wotton-under-Edge ===
Wotton-under-Edge (3 seats)
Party	Candidate	Votes	%	±%
Liberal Democrats	Linda Cohen	1,185	48.8	−4.8
Green	Catherine Braun*	1,090	44.9	−7.7
Green	Gareth Kitchen	743	30.6	N/A
Liberal Democrats	Mark Walter	740	30.5	−12.9
Conservative	Graham Smith	558	23.0	−16.3
Liberal Democrats	Lisa Carr	541	22.3	N/A
Green	Eleanor Meehan	431	17.8	N/A
Labour	Steven Mackay	354	14.6	N/A
Labour	Rachel Curley	343	14.1	N/A
Labour	John Bloxsom	332	13.7	N/A
Conservative	Andrew Reynolds	316	13.0	−10.7
Conservative	Allan Nolan	304	12.5	−9.8
Turnout		2,432	43.88	
Registered electors		5,542		
Liberal Democrats hold				
Green hold				
Green gain from Liberal Democrats				

== By-elections ==
=== Stroud Central ===
Stroud Central By-Election 1 May 2025
Party	Candidate	Votes	%	±%
Green	Cate James-Hodges	416	56.3	+15.8
Labour	Shelley Rider	118	16.0	–34.7
Reform	Daryl Smith	108	14.6	N/A
Conservative	Hena Mannan-Rahman	60	8.1	–0.6
Liberal Democrats	Philip Purves	27	3.7	N/A
UKIP	Lucian Aeris	10	1.4	N/A
Majority		298	40.3	N/A
Turnout		743	40.9	
Green gain from Labour				

=== Severn ===
Severn By-Election 11 June 2025
Party	Candidate	Votes	%	±%
Green	Moya Shannon	439	27.8	+10.0
Conservative	Hena Mannan-Rahman	425	26.9	–6.7
Reform	Jonathan Wren	421	26.7	N/A
Labour	Karen Frances Linforth	177	11.2	–21.3
Liberal Democrats	Mike Stayte	112	7.1	–9.1
UKIP	Ben Walker	5	0.3	N/A
Majority		14	0.9	N/A
Turnout		1,579	26.8	
Green gain from Labour				

=== Thrupp ===
Thrupp by-election: 5 March 2026
Party	Candidate	Votes	%	±%
Green	Helen Elliott-Boult	540	67.3	▲2.9
Reform	Michael Rees	132	16.5	N/A
Conservative	Anthony Pilkington	58	7.2	▼10.3
Labour Co-op	Mick Fealty	46	5.7	▼12.4
Liberal Democrats	Raffy Chiswick	22	2.7	N/A
UKIP	Lucian Aeris	2	0.2	N/A
Majority		408	50.9	▲4.9
Turnout		802	41.3	▼10.2
Registered electors		1,944		
Green hold				

The by-election was triggered by the resignation of councillor Beki Aldam.

=== Kingswood ===
Kingswood by-election: 2 September 2026
Party	Candidate	Votes	%	±%
Liberal Democrats	Fred Hulls	442	64.0	−18.1
Conservative	Louise Tandy	109	15.8	+6.4
Reform	Michael Rees	70	10.1	N/A
Green	Alasdair Liddell	40	5.8	+1.0
Labour	Claire Cook	30	4.3	+0.5
Majority		333	48.2	−24.4
Turnout		691	37.3	−8.5
Liberal Democrats hold		Swing		

=== Rodborough ===
The by-election was triggered by the resignation of Labour councillor Katy Hofmann, who cited health-related issues as the reason for her resignation.

Rodborough by-election: 13 October 2026
Party	Candidate	Votes	%	±%
Labour	John Bloxsom	697	47.0	+13.3
Green	Robin Layfield	470	31.7	+1.5
Reform	Gerald O'Brien	191	12.9	N/A
Conservative	Christopher Easton	103	6.9	−3.9
Liberal Democrats	George James	23	1.5	N/A
Majority		227	15.3	N/A
Turnout		1,486	42.2	−7.2
Rejected ballots		2	0.1	
Registered electors		3,519		
Labour hold		Swing	▲5.9	
