= 2016 Stroud District Council election =

2016 UK local government election

← 2015	5 May 2016	2021 →

All 51 seats to Stroud District Council 26 seats needed for a majority

	First party	Second party
Party	Conservative	Labour
Seats won	23	18
Seat change	▲3	▼1
Popular vote	14,274	13,079
Percentage	30.8%	28.3%
Swing	▼9.1pp	▼2.1pp
	Third party	Fourth party
Party	Green	Liberal Democrats
Seats won	8	2
Seat change	▲2	▼1
Popular vote	10,946	4,080
Percentage	23.7%	8.8%
Swing	▲4.4pp	▲3.2pp
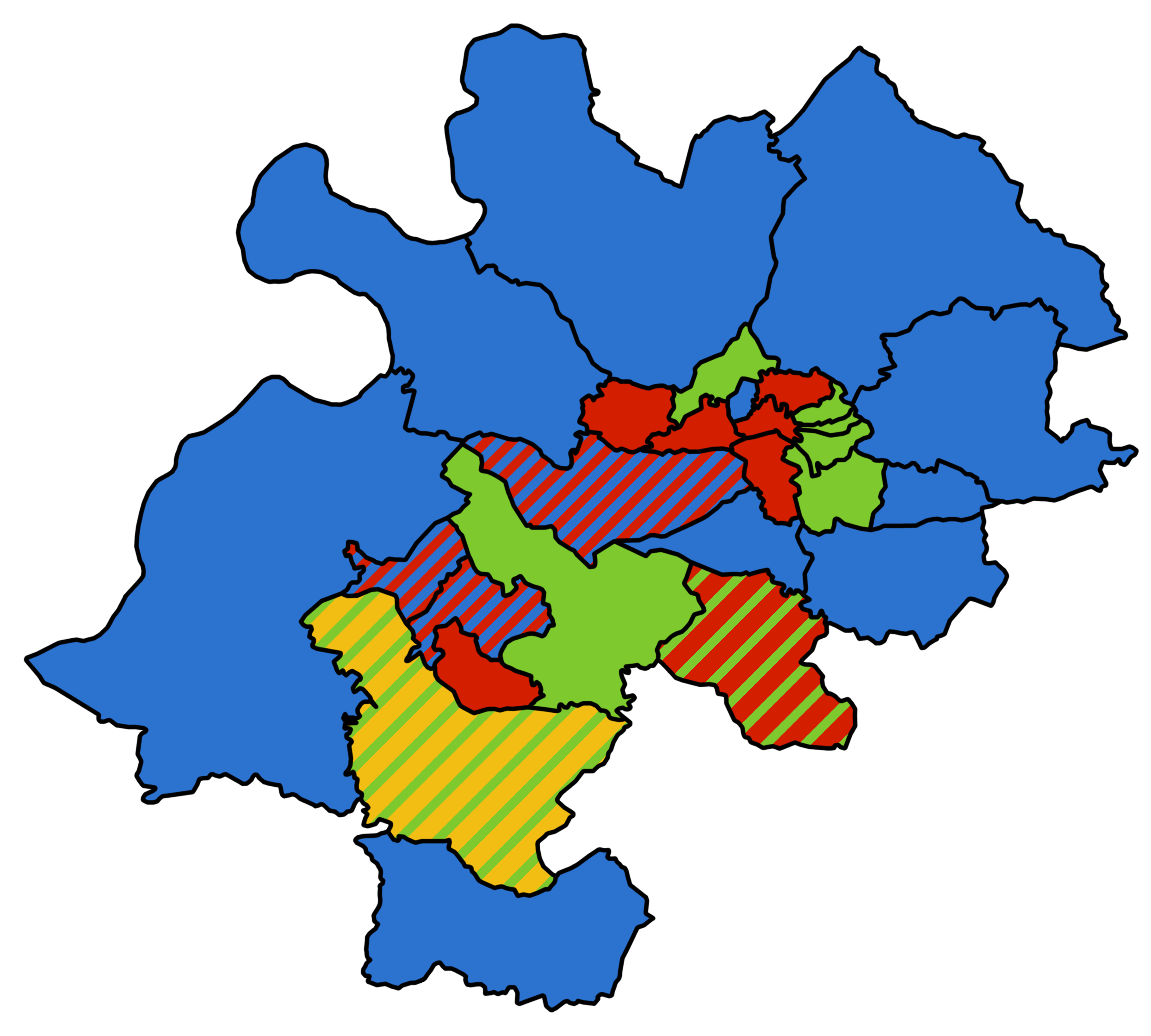
- 2016 local election results in Stroud
Council control before election
No Overall Control
Council control after election
No Overall Control

The 2016 Stroud District Council election took place on 5 May 2016 to elect members of Stroud District Council in England. This was on the same day as other local elections. Due to boundary changes, all seats were up for election, with the council moving to a four-year election cycle.

== Results summary ==
Stroud District Council election, 2016
Party	Candidates	Seats	Gains	Losses	Net gain/loss	Seats %	Votes %	Votes	+/−
Conservative		23			▲3	45.1	30.8	14,274	▼9.1
Labour		18			▼1	35.3	28.3	13,079	▼2.1
Green		8			▲2	15.7	23.7	10,946	▲4.4
Liberal Democrats		2			▼1	3.9	8.8	4,080	▲3.2
Independent		0			▼1	0.0	5.7	2,625	▲4.5
UKIP		0			Steady	0.0	2.5	1,151	▼0.6
TUSC		0			Steady	0.0	0.3	120	▼0.2

A total of 181 ballots were rejected, and the overall turnout was 42.59%.

== Ward results ==
=== Amberley & Woodchester ===
Amberley & Woodchester (1 seat)
Party	Candidate	Votes	%	±%
Conservative	Philip Louis McAsey	366	45.7	
Labour	Jo Smith	297	37.1	
Green	Martyn George Cutcher	138	17.2	
Majority		69	8.6	
Turnout		806	47.3	
Rejected ballots		5	0.6	
Conservative win				

=== Berkeley Vale ===
Berkeley Vale (3 seats)
Party	Candidate	Votes	%	±%
Conservative	Gordon Alexander Stark Craig*	1,279	52.2	
Conservative	Penny Wride*	1,172	47.8	
Conservative	Haydn Jones	1,050	42.9	
Labour	Liz Ashton*	951	38.8	
Labour	Billy Hunt	672	27.4	
Labour	George Frederick Coleman Knight	646	26.4	
Liberal Democrats	Michael Robert Stayte	370	15.1	
Liberal Democrats	Nick Easby	317	12.9	
Liberal Democrats	Rob Jewell	234	9.6	
Green	Tom Willetts	227	9.3	
Majority		99	4.1	
Turnout		2,456	44.3	
Rejected ballots		6	0.2	
Conservative win				
Conservative win				
Conservative win				

=== Bisley ===
Bisley (1 seat)
Party	Candidate	Votes	%	±%
Conservative	Tim Williams*	515	57.2	
Green	Anna Elizabeth Bonallack	280	31.1	
Labour	Richard Alan House	105	11.7	
Majority		235	26.1	
Turnout		902	48.7	
Rejected ballots		2	0.2	
Conservative win				

=== Cainscross ===
Cainscross (3 seats)
Party	Candidate	Votes	%	±%
Labour	Rachel Curley	924	43.8	
Labour	Jenny Miles	903	42.8	
Labour	Tom Williams*	775	36.7	
Independent	David Mark Rees*	616	29.2	
Green	Patricia Helen Royall	498	23.6	
Conservative	Keith Stuart Rippington	487	23.1	
Conservative	Colin Chrisholm	405	19.2	
Conservative	Anthony Richard Powell	405	19.2	
Independent	Graham Keith Stanley	348	16.5	
Liberal Democrats	Sylvia Jean Bridgland	297	14.1	
TUSC	Chris Moore	52	2.5	
TUSC	Adam Mark Goulcher	32	1.5	
TUSC	Ray Darlington	30	1.4	
Majority		159	7.5	
Turnout		2,116	35.9	
Rejected ballots		5	0.2	
Labour win				
Labour win				
Labour win				

=== Cam East ===
Cam East (2 seats)
Party	Candidate	Votes	%	±%
Labour	Miranda Anne Clifton*	742	51.2	
Conservative	Brian Tipper*	707	48.8	
Conservative	Graham Blackshaw	546	37.7	
Labour	James Kenneth Martin Prewett	533	36.8	
Green	Steven Naumann	175	12.1	
Majority		161	11.1	
Turnout		1,458	40.3	
Rejected ballots		8	0.5	
Labour win				
Conservative win				

=== Cam West ===
Cam West (2 seats)
Party	Candidate	Votes	%	±%
Labour	Paul Anthony Denney*	566	48.1	
Conservative	Jessica Mary Olivia Tomblin	518	44.0	
Labour	Julie Alyson Douglass*	517	44.0	
Conservative	Neil Edward Fletcher	487	41.4	
Green	Neil Richards Buick	153	13.0	
Majority		1	0.0	
Turnout		1,182	38.8	
Rejected ballots		6	0.5	
Labour win				
Conservative win				

=== Chalford ===
Chalford (3 seats)
Party	Candidate	Votes	%	±%
Conservative	Liz Peters*	930	43.7	
Conservative	Chas Fellows*	927	43.6	
Conservative	Debbie Young*	905	42.5	
Green	Carolyn Jane Billingsley	810	38.1	
Labour	Helen Joan Beioley	799	37.6	
Labour	David Arthur Taylor	738	34.7	
UKIP	Adrian George Blake	353	16.6	
Majority		95	4.4	
Turnout		2,130	42.2	
Rejected ballots		3	0.1	
Conservative win				
Conservative win				
Conservative win				

=== Coaley & Uley ===
Coaley & Uley (1 seat)
Party	Candidate	Votes	%	±%
Green	Jim Dewey	532	52.9	
Conservative	Tim Boxall*	350	34.8	
Labour	Brendan Skelton	124	12.3	
Majority		182	18.1	
Turnout		1,012	52.8	
Rejected ballots		6	0.6	
Green win				

=== Dursley ===
Dursley (3 seats)
Party	Candidate	Votes	%	±%
Labour	Doina Claire Cornell*	932	48.3	
Labour	Colin Patrick Fryer*	851	44.1	
Labour	Alison Margaret Hayward	757	39.3	
Conservative	Loraine Vivienne Patrick	623	32.3	
Liberal Democrats	Brian Arthur Marsh	606	31.4	
Conservative	Andrea Elizabeth Sheffield	583	30.2	
Conservative	Patricia Ann Betteley	565	29.3	
Green	Miriam Janice Yagud	359	18.6	
Majority		134	7.0	
Turnout		1,936	37.0	
Rejected ballots		8	0.4	
Labour win				
Labour win				
Labour win				

=== Hardwicke ===
Hardwicke (3 seats)
Party	Candidate	Votes	%	±%
Conservative	Dave Mossman*	902	56.1	
Conservative	Gill Oxley	883	54.9	
Conservative	Tom Skinner	666	41.4	
Independent	Gerald Owain Hartley	614	38.2	
Green	Sally Pickering	447	27.8	
Labour	Steve Price	439	27.3	
Majority		52	3.2	
Turnout		1,613	30.6	
Rejected ballots		6	0.4	
Conservative win				
Conservative win				
Conservative win				

=== Kingswood ===
Kingswood (1 seat)
Party	Candidate	Votes	%	±%
Conservative	Richard Mark Reeves	335	48.3	
Liberal Democrats	Oliver Hartland Mountjoy	283	40.8	
Green	Alan Graham Sage	76	11.0	
Majority		52	7.5	
Turnout		701	41.1	
Rejected ballots		6	0.9	
Conservative win				

=== Minchinhampton ===
Minchinhampton (2 seats)
Party	Candidate	Votes	%	±%
Conservative	Dorcas Lavinia Maxine Binns*	844	55.2	
Conservative	Nick Hurst*	760	49.7	
Labour	Mark Christopher Huband	339	22.2	
Green	Chris Jockel	309	20.2	
Liberal Democrats	Colleen Rothwell	264	17.3	
Liberal Democrats	Jean Marie Etridge	240	15.7	
TUSC	Ruth Amias	68	4.4	
Majority		421	27.5	
Turnout		1,535	42.3	
Rejected ballots		5	0.3	
Conservative win				
Conservative win				

=== Nailsworth ===
Nailsworth (3 seats)
Party	Candidate	Votes	%	±%
Labour	Steve Robinson*	1,455	62.1	
Labour	Sue Reed	1,358	58.0	
Green	Norman Kay	1,185	50.6	
Conservative	Emma Sims*	899	38.4	
Conservative	Charles Edward O’Neill	685	29.2	
Conservative	Ryan Davis	606	25.9	
Majority		286	12.2	
Turnout		2,356	44.6	
Rejected ballots		14	0.6	
Labour win				
Labour win				
Green win				

=== Painswick & Upton ===
Painswick & Upton (3 seats)
Party	Candidate	Votes	%	±%
Conservative	Nigel Robin Cooper*	1,350	56.8	
Conservative	Julie Anthea Job*	1,350	56.8	
Conservative	Keith Lionel Pearson*	1,224	51.5	
Green	Peter Adams	809	34.0	
Labour	Sarah Ruth Madley	680	28.6	
UKIP	Richard Ford	397	16.7	
Majority		415	17.5	
Turnout		2,384	42.3	
Rejected ballots		7	0.3	
Conservative win				
Conservative win				
Conservative win				

=== Randwick, Whiteshill & Ruscombe ===
Randwick, Whiteshill & Ruscombe (1 seat)
Party	Candidate	Votes	%	±%
Green	Jonathan Paul Edmunds*	489	59.4	
Conservative	Tom Cooper	184	22.4	
Labour	John Bloxson	150	18.2	
Majority		305	37.0	
Turnout		829	47.6	
Rejected ballots		6	0.72	
Green win				

=== Rodborough ===
Rodborough (2 seats)
Party	Candidate	Votes	%	±%
Labour	Nigel Andrew Prenter*	693	44.7	
Labour	Karen Helen McKeown	656	42.3	
Conservative	Libby Bird	435	28.0	
Green	Philip Sven Blomberg	335	21.6	
Conservative	Sarah Leslie Shaw	304	19.6	
Liberal Democrats	Christine Linda Headley	285	18.4	
Green	Kiera Megan Jones	207	13.3	
Majority		221	14.3	
Turnout		1,557	43.4	
Rejected ballots		5	0.3	
Labour win				
Labour win				

=== Severn ===
Severn (2 seats)
Party	Candidate	Votes	%	±%
Conservative	John Frederick Jones*	723	49.9	
Conservative	Stephen Frank Davies*	721	49.8	
Labour	Thomas Joseph Lydon	446	30.8	
Liberal Democrats	John Reginald Howe	353	24.4	
Green	Robin Lewis	291	20.1	
Majority		275	19.0	
Turnout		1,463	36.9	
Rejected ballots		14	1.0	
Conservative win				
Conservative win				

=== Stonehouse ===
Stonehouse (3 seats)
Party	Candidate	Votes	%	±%
Labour	Chris Brine*	1,102	55.9	
Labour	Mattie Ross*	1,058	53.6	
Labour	Gary Dean Powell*	1,039	52.7	
Conservative	Ray Clegg	466	23.6	
Conservative	Ginny Anne Smart	430	21.8	
Green	Carol Jill Kambites	363	18.4	
Conservative	Aaron James Newell	345	17.5	
Independent	Trevor Royston Baker	306	15.5	
Independent	Ciaran James Brazington	296	15.0	
Majority		573	29.1	
Turnout		1,982	34.7	
Rejected ballots		9	0.5	
Labour win				
Labour win				
Labour win				

=== Stroud Central ===
Stroud Central (1 seat)
Party	Candidate	Votes	%	±%
Labour	Skeena Rathor	275	39.4	
Green	Caroline Baird	268	38.4	
Conservative	Marcus William Shaw	154	22.1	
Majority		7	1.0	
Turnout		708	42.7	
Rejected ballots		11	1.6	
Labour win				

=== Stroud Farmhill & Paganhill ===
Stroud Farmhill & Paganhill (1 seat)
Party	Candidate	Votes	%	±%
Conservative	Haydn Leonard Sutton*	300	39.8	
Labour	Paul Mapplebeck	208	27.6	
Independent	Harry Carr	132	17.5	
Green	Brian Nimblette	113	15.0	
Majority		92	12.2	
Turnout		759	40.6	
Rejected ballots		4	0.5	
Conservative win				

=== Stroud Slade ===
Stroud Slade (1 seat)
Party	Candidate	Votes	%	±%
Green	Simon Paul Christopher Pickering*	363	51.6	
Labour	Vanessa Price	260	37.0	
Conservative	Kris Anthony Smith	80	11.4	
Majority		103	14.6	
Turnout		707	41.3	
Rejected ballots		4	0.6	
Green win				

=== Stroud Trinity ===
Stroud Trinity (1 seat)
Party	Candidate	Votes	%	±%
Green	John Marjoram*	489	61.1	
Labour	Roy Derbyshire	199	24.9	
Conservative	Ian Arthur Edmunds	112	14.0	
Majority		290	36.2	
Turnout		807	47.4	
Rejected ballots		7	0.9	
Green win				

=== Stroud Uplands ===
Stroud Uplands (1 seat)
Party	Candidate	Votes	%	±%
Labour	Chas Townley*	319	42.9	
Independent	Roger Sanders	235	31.6	
Green	Peter Richardson	110	14.8	
Conservative	Jeremy Norman Bennett Strickland	79	10.6	
Majority		84	11.3	
Turnout		749	44.8	
Rejected ballots		6	0.8	
Labour win				

=== Stroud Valley ===
Stroud Valley (1 seat)
Party	Candidate	Votes	%	±%
Green	Martin Baxendale*	394	54.5	
Labour	Joe Ambridge	234	32.4	
Conservative	John Stanton	95	13.1	
Majority		160	22.1	
Turnout		728	42.5	
Rejected ballots		4	0.5	
Green win				

=== The Stanleys ===
The Stanleys (2 seats)
Party	Candidate	Votes	%	±%
Labour	Stephen Leslie Lydon*	740	50.5	
Conservative	Nigel William John Studdert-Kennedy*	617	42.1	
Labour	Debbie Tara Hicks	540	36.9	
Conservative	Lawrie Hall	534	36.5	
Green	Nicola Caryl Hillary	283	19.3	
Majority		77	5.2	
Turnout		1,479	44.3	
Rejected ballots		15	1.0	
Labour win				
Conservative win				

=== Thrupp ===
Thrupp (1 seat)
Party	Candidate	Votes	%	±%
Green	Martin Whiteside*	620	69.7	
Conservative	Steve Wigzell	170	19.1	
Labour	Rod Beer	100	11.2	
Majority		450	50.6	
Turnout		896	48.2	
Rejected ballots		4	0.4	
Green win				

=== Wotton-under-Edge ===
Wotton-under-Edge (3 seats)
Party	Candidate	Votes	%	±%
Liberal Democrats	Ken Tucker*	1,622	63.5	
Green	Catherine Braun	830	32.5	
Liberal Democrats	George Butcher	804	31.5	
Conservative	Lesley Reeves*	754	29.5	
Liberal Democrats	Adrian Walker-Smith	745	29.2	
Independent	Alex Wilkinson	722	28.3	
Conservative	Henry Binns	480	18.8	
Conservative	Alexander Wheeler	419	16.4	
UKIP	Henry David Hinder	401	15.7	
Majority		50	2.0	
Turnout		2,558	47.2	
Rejected ballots		5	0.2	
Liberal Democrats win				
Green win				
Liberal Democrats win				
