= Neil Carmichael (English politician) =

British politician (born 1951)

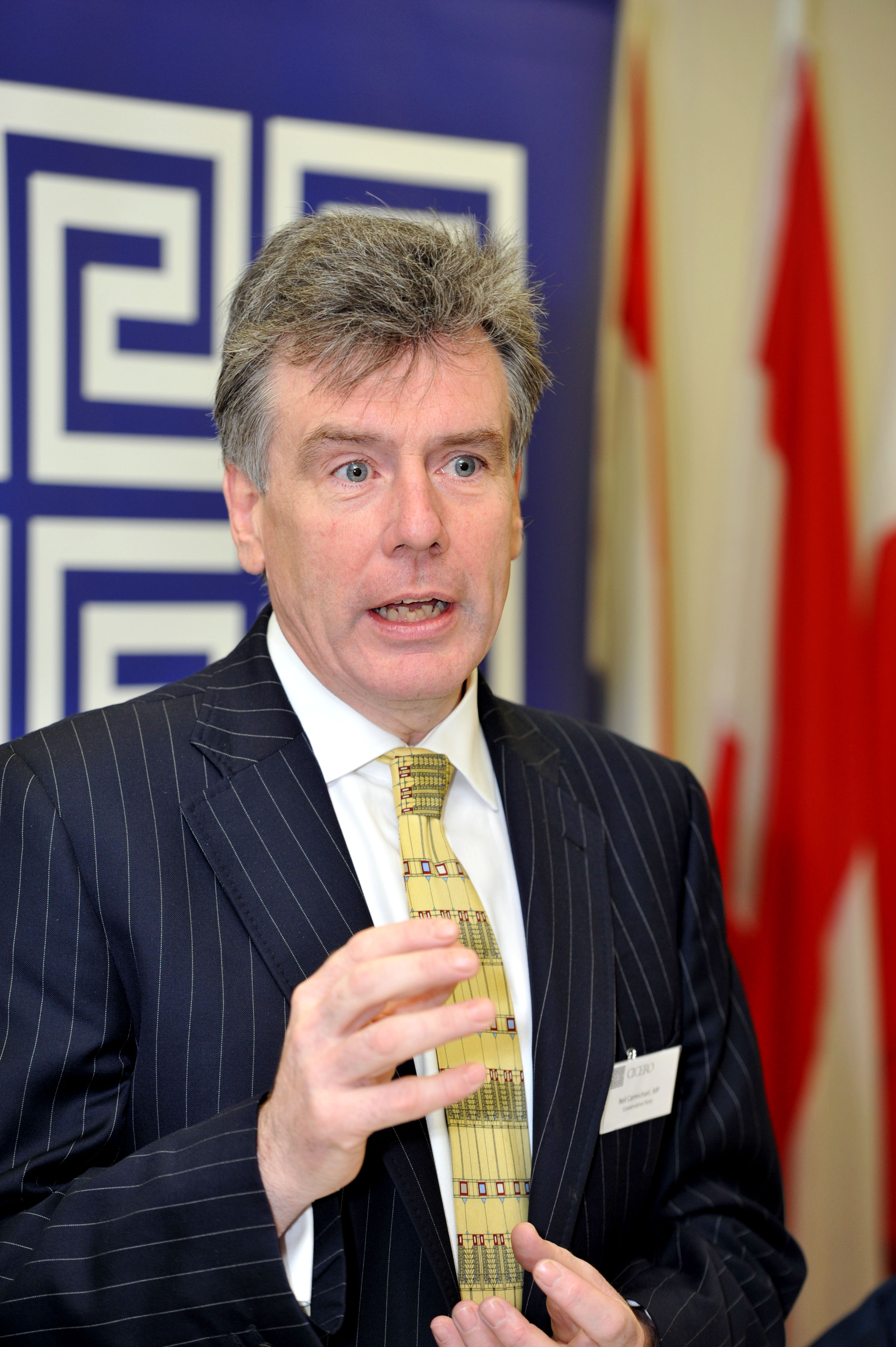
- Carmichael in 2013

Chair of the Education Select Committee
- In office 18 June 2015 – 3 May 2017
- Preceded by: Graham Stuart
- Succeeded by: Robert Halfon

Member of Parliament for Stroud
- In office 6 May 2010 – 3 May 2017
- Preceded by: David Drew
- Succeeded by: David Drew

Personal details
- Born: 15 April 1961 (age 65) Hexham, Northumberland, England
- Party: Independent
- Other political affiliations: Conservative (until April 2019); Change UK (April 2019 – September 2019); Liberal Democrats (joined September 2019)
- Education: University of Nottingham
- Website: www.neilcarmichael.info

William Neil Carmichael (born 15 April 1961) is a British politician who served as the Member of Parliament (MP) for Stroud from 2010 until 2017. In April 2019, he announced he had left the Conservative Party; he subsequently joined Change UK for which he was an unsuccessful candidate in the East of England constituency at the 2019 European Parliament election. In September 2019, Carmichael joined the Liberal Democrats but left after one year.

== Earlier activities in politics ==
Carmichael began his political career after being elected to Northumberland County Council in 1989, on which he served for four years. In the 1992 general election, he was the unsuccessful Conservative Party candidate for the parliamentary seat of Leeds East. He was also beaten contesting Leeds at the 1994 European Parliament elections.

In 1999, Carmichael moved to Gloucestershire where he was selected to stand for Stroud in the 2001 general election, losing to the Labour Party's David Drew. He contested the seat again in the 2005 general election, losing again to Drew.

== Parliamentary career ==
Carmichael gained Stroud from David Drew in the 2010 general election, with a 2% swing to the Conservatives from Labour and a majority of 1,299. He made his maiden speech on 2 June 2010 and became a member of the Environmental Audit Committee, whose task is to monitor the worthiness of all government department activity from the perspective of cutting carbon emissions.

Carmichael's consistent policy interest is in education; he was a member of the Education Select Committee of the House of Commons with the duty to scrutinise the Department for Education and provide oversight on behalf of Parliament, before being elected as its chair in June 2015. Earlier, in 2011, he founded the All Party Group on Education, Governance and Leadership after coauthoring a report seeking to influence the reform of school governing boards. He proposed a bill on the issue under the Ten Minute Rule in late 2014, but it made no further progress.

In 2012, Carmichael founded the All Party Parliamentary Group on Vascular disease to raise awareness and encourages further research into vascular disease. As Chair of the group. he co-authored reports which highlighted the regional differences in amputation rates throughout England and which found there could be over 5,000 unnecessary leg amputations a year . He also served as the Secretary of the Associate Parliamentary Health Group.

In 2013, Carmichael successfully piloted his Bill through Parliament for the UK to fulfil its international environmental obligations in the Antarctic.

Later that year, he voted in favour of Same Sex Marriage at every opportunity.

Carmichael was one of the most active participants in parliamentary debates during his time in the House of Commons; the BBC reported in July 2011 that he ranked fourth amongst more than 200 MPs who were first elected in 2010 in the number of debates attended. As of 14 September 2011, he has voted in over 88% of divisions since becoming an MP, far above the average. Though being an active debater, he has always voted exactly in line with the Conservative whip, and on just one occasion he has voted in the opposite direction to the majority of voting Conservatives in a motion to bring a bill for a ban on smoking in private vehicles where there are children present.

Carmichael was re-elected in the 2015 general election, with his majority increased to 4,886. However, he lost the seat in the 2017 general election by 687 votes to David Drew, the MP for the seat before 2010.

Carmichael was opposed to Brexit prior to the 2016 European membership referendum.

=== Controversies ===
In May 2016, it emerged that Carmichael was one of a number of Conservative MPs being investigated by police in the 2015 United Kingdom general election party spending investigation, for allegedly spending more than the legal limit for his constituency in his election campaign. As of 16 March 2017, it was clear that the Gloucester police force had passed files to the Crown Prosecution Service for a possible prosecution, but not whether those pertained to Carmichael, to Cheltenham MP Alex Chalk, or to both. The CPS have confirmed that no further action will be taken.

In 2010, Carmichael was accused of hypocrisy over wind farms by locals in Northumberland unhappy over his support for a wind farm development on land that he owns at Bavington Hill Head Farm in Northumberland, while as a Conservative candidate describing a single turbine proposed at Nympsfield as a “monstrosity”, and pledging to work to protect Gloucestershire's rural landscapes from “excessive” developments. Carmichael's argument is that many proposed schemes in Gloucestershire border on, or are in, the Cotswolds Area of Outstanding Natural Beauty whereas the proposed scheme in Northumberland has no such concerns.

Carmichael was criticised by CAMRA for voting with the Government against an amendment to allow licensees to choose a non-tied pub lease after reportedly promising them that he would support the amendment in a photoshoot the day before.

Carmichael has publicly opposed grammar schools and selective education, yet was accused of hypocrisy after it was revealed that he sent his children to selective grammar schools.

Carmichael has expressed scepticism regarding the importance of religion. On Newsnight on 30 August 2017, he said that the UK is now 'a secular liberal nation' and that religion, along with race, should not be a significant factor in determining the choice of foster parents.

== 2017 to present ==
Following the 2017 general election, Carmichael has pursued a number of initiatives in education policy. Carmichael runs a consultancy Dunshiel Education, bringing together senior education policy experts to provide strategic advice on emerging public policy. He was appointed honorary professor of Politics and Education at Nottingham University in December 2017 and regularly lectures on Brexit and education issues. Carmichael also chairs the Commission on Sustainable Learning for Work, Life and a Changing Economy supported by Pearson Education.

In early 2018, Carmichael became President of the Conservatives for a People's Vote, #C4PV campaign.

During 2019, Carmichael became chair of the Association of Dental Groups (www.theadg.co.uk) and Chief Executive Officer of UCEC (www.ucec-education.com).

In April 2019, Carmichael announced that he had left the Conservative Party to register with The Independent Group, later also known as Change UK. In the 2019 European Parliament election, he was second on the party's list of candidates in the East of England constituency. They received 3.65% of the vote in the constituency and none of their candidates were elected.

In September 2019, Carmichael joined the Liberal Democrats.

Parliament of the United Kingdom
Preceded by David Drew	Member of Parliament for Stroud; 2010 – 2017	Succeeded by David Drew
