= 2011 Stroud District Council election =

2011 English local election

Results of the 2011 Stroud District Council election

The 2011 Stroud Council election was held on 6 May 2011, to elect 18 of the 51 members of the Stroud District Council in England. The system at the time was for one third of the seats to be contested for three years, and one year with no elections, so normally only 17 seats would have been vacant. Candidates from six parties, and two independents, campaigned for the seats, in individual races, except in Nailsworth where two seats were vacant, as a result of Green councillor Fi MacMillan (elected 2008) stepping down a year early. The Labour Party won the most seats, seven.

== Election result ==
Stroud Council election, 2011
Party	Seats	Gains	Losses	Net gain/loss	Seats %	Votes %	Votes	+/−
Conservative	4				22.23%	34.10%	9,858	
Independent	1				5.56%	3.10%	864	
Green	5				27.78%	17.07%	4,765	
Labour	7				38.89%	34.48%	9,626	
Liberal Democrats	1				5.56%	13.46%	3,758	
TUSC	0				0%	0.02%	45	

== Ward results ==
Each ward elected one councillor except Nailsworth which elected two.

Cainscross
Party	Candidate	Votes	%	±%
Liberal Democrats	Sylvia Bridgland	190	7.94%	−9.56%
Green	Christopher Owen	235	9.83%	
Labour	David Rees	1,237	51.78%	
Conservative	Julie Zimmer	731	30.55%	
Majority		1,237	51.78%	+7.18%
Turnout		2,393	43.30%	−26.80%

Cam East
Party	Candidate	Votes	%	±%
Labour	Miranda Clifton	779	47.20%	+12.30%
Conservative	Brian Tipper	871	52.80%	
Majority		871	52.80%	+14.50
Turnout		1,650	45.60%	−30.00%

Cam West
Party	Candidate	Votes	%	±%
Labour	Paul Denney	683	46.90%	
Liberal Democrats	Darren Jones	301	20.70%	
Conservative	Matthew Patrick	473	32.50%	
Majority		683	46.90%	+1.10%
Turnout		1,457	45.60%	−26.70%

Central
Party	Candidate	Votes	%	±%
Labour	Malcolm Perry	155	21.60%	
Independent	Andrew Read	354	49.20%	
Conservative	Ian Robinson	210	29.20%	
Majority		354	49.20%	
Turnout		719	45.30%	

Chalford
Party	Candidate	Votes	%	±%
Green	Richard Dean	649	25.1%	−4.00%
Conservative	Elizabeth Peters	1,302	50.30%	
Labour	David Taylor	638	24.60%	
Majority		1,302	50.30%	−1.20%
Turnout		2,589	51.70%	−26.70%

Dursley
Party	Candidate	Votes	%	±%
Liberal Democrats	Veronica Harding	416	18.60%	
Conservative	Loraine Patrick	679	30.40%	
Labour	Geoffrey Wheeler	1,026	45.90%	+16.10%
Green	Miriam Yagud	112	5.00%	+3.00%
Majority		1,026	45.90%	+12.90%
Turnout		2,233	43.50%	−24.60%

Farmhill & Paganhill
Party	Candidate	Votes	%	±%
Conservative	Henry Carr	304	36.10%	
Labour	David Drew	538	63.90%	
Majority		538	63.90%	
Turnout		842	50.30%	

Minchinhampton
Party	Candidate	Votes	%	±%
Conservative	Dorcas Binns	1,108	55.50%	
Green	William Heaney	263	13.20%	
Labour	Joan Moore	270	13.50%	
Independent	John Williams	354	17.70%	
Majority		1,108	55.50%	
Turnout		1,995	56.00%	

Nailsworth (2 councillors)
Party	Candidate	Votes	%	±%
Conservative	Paul Carter	1,147	22.41%	
Green	Catherine Farrell	933	13.34%	
Green	Norman Kay	930	18.21%	
Labour	Audrey Smith	661	12.92%	
Labour	Jacqueline Smith	608	11.88%	
Conservative	Louise Roden	841	16.43%	
Majority		1,988	38.84%	
Turnout		5,120	51.90%	

Rodborough
Party	Candidate	Votes	%	±%
Green	Philip Blomberg	213	11.40%	
Liberal Democrats	Christine Headley	591	31.50%	
Labour	Nigel Prenter	617	32.90%	
Conservative	Adam Sarch	453	24.20%	
Majority		617	32.90%	
Turnout		1,874	51.50%	

Slade
Party	Candidate	Votes	%	±%
Labour	Shelagh Hume	270	43.50%	
Green	Simon Pickering	350	56.50%	
Majority		350	56.50%	
Turnout		620	40.20%	

Stonehouse
Party	Candidate	Votes	%	±%
Labour	Christopher Brine	1,346	55.00%	
Conservative	Lawrence Hall	789	32.20%	
Green	Clare Sheridan	314	12.80%	+5.00
Majority		1,346	55.00%	+13.10%
Turnout		2,449	41.00%	−26.40%

Thrupp
Party	Candidate	Votes	%	±%
Conservative	Elisabeth Bird	319	28.90%	
Liberal Democrats	Adrian Walker-Smith	49	4.40%	
Green	Martin Whiteside	591	53.60%	
Labour	Lesley Williams	143	13.00%	
Majority		591	53.60%	
Turnout		1,102	58.40%	

Trinity
Party	Candidate	Votes	%	±%
Conservative	William Mansell	178	20.30%	
Labour	Paul Mapplebeck	149	17.00%	
Green	John Marjoram	551	62.80%	
Majority		551	62.80%	
Turnout		878	51.80%	

Uplands
Party	Candidate	Votes	%	±%
Green	Rachel Lyons	137	16.60%	
TUSC	Christopher Moore	45	5.40%	
Labour	Roger Sanders	551	62.80%	
Independent	Timothy Seager	156	18.90%	
Majority		488	59.10%	
Turnout		826	49.40%	

Valley
Party	Candidate	Votes	%	±%
Conservative	Julie Job	190	21.40%	
Labour	Stephen Lydon	279	31.50%	
Green	Molly Scott-Cato	417	47.10%	
Majority		417	47.10%	
Turnout		886	47.50%	

Wotton-Under-Edge
Party	Candidate	Votes	%	±%
Labour	Philip Boobyer	347	13.00%	
Conservative	Jacqueline Cartigny	1,104	41.50%	
Liberal Democrats	Paul Smith	1,211	45.50%	
Majority		1,211	45.50%	−9.40%
Turnout		2,662	52.50%	−21.10%
