= Stroud Constituency Labour Party =

Local branch of the Labour Party (UK)

The Labour Party has been active in the Stroud constituency area since at least 1897 and the constituency has been represented in UK Parliament by three Labour MPs, Ben Parkin, David Drew and Simon Opher. The Constituency Labour Party first purchased a building in 1930.

The Party is currently represented by 18 Councillors on Stroud District Council and one on the wider area of Gloucestershire County Council. Previous Labour Group leaders have included Steve Lydon, Margaret Nolder, Steve Greenwood. Labour leaders on the predecessor Councils have included Bill Maddox (Stroud RDC) Walter Preston(Stroud UDC) and Tom Langham (Stroud UDC). Tom Langham was the first Labour Chair of Stroud UDC in 1935. On 30 June 2022, Cllr Doina Cornell, the Leader of Stroud District Council, left the Labour Party following her removal from the long list of Labour candidates for the Stroud Parliamentary constituency. Three other members of the council also left the Labour Party the day after, with more following the subsequent year.

== Independent Labour Party ==
The first recorded attempt to promote Socialism in Stroud was a visit of 40 trade unionists and ILP members in June 1895, this was chaired by David Fraser the President of the Gloucester ILP. In July 1897 the “Clarion Van” visited Stroud for four days and meetings were addressed by John Bruce Glasier, Councillor Alpass(from Berkeley), Fenton Macpherson and Mary Macpherson. Glasier and the Macphersons were accommodated by a Mr and Mrs Hunt during their stay in Stroud. A branch of the ILP was formed in the Town in August 1897. A public meeting organised by the Branch was held on Sunday 16 January 1898 addressed by Pete Curran.

== Trades and Labour Council ==
A Trades and Labour Council started in about 1898.

The Trades Union Congress continues to support a network of locally organised Union Councils and while the Stroud Trades Council came to an end in about 1999 there are 21 Trades Councils in the South West with two covering Gloucestershire—Cheltenham and District Trades Council and Gloucester and District Trades Council .

== Trade and Labour Club ==
By 1908 the Labour Movement had a Club building on Lower Street.

== Far Hill ==
The official opening of the new Headquarters for the Constituency at Far Hill on Cainscross Road took place on 20 September 1930. The building has previously been the depot of the Cotswold Grocery Stores and had been purchased for £1000 with the Club and Institute becoming the headquarters of the Stroud Constituency Labour Party but also the home of trade union branches in the area. Charles Duncan Labour MP for Clay Cross visited the town for the official opening. The building was sold to Stroud Urban District Council in the early 1970s and demolished and the site was used for a waste tip and council car park but has subsequently been redeveloped for a DIY store. The Current Labour Party offices are based at 5a Lansdown.

== Parliamentary candidates ==
The first time a Labour Candidate contested an election for the Stroud Constituency was in 1918. Of the 17 individuals who have stood, two were elected for Stroud with four others subsequently elected for other constituencies.

=== Stroud 1918–1945 ===
Labour Candidates in Stroud Constituency 1918–1945
Election Year	Candidate name	Votes	%	±%	Comments
1918	Charles Wye Kendall	8,522	40.1	New	Not Elected
1922	Samuel E Walters	5,081	17.6	−22.5	Not Elected
1923	No Candidate				
1924	Edith Picton-Turbervill	7,418	25.2	New	Not Elected Later MP for Wrekin
1929	F. E. White	10,384	26.1	+0.9	Not Elected
1931	John Maynard	10,688	30.0	+3.9	Not Elected
1935	Constance Borrett	14,133	36.8	+8.2	Not Elected
1945	Ben Parkin	22,495	40.8	+4.0	First Labour MP Elected

=== 1950–1951 ===
Labour Candidate Stroud and Thornbury Constituency 1950 and 1951
Election Year	Candidate name	Votes	%	±%	Comments
1950	Ben Parkin	24,846	43.4		Lost seat
1951	Ben Parkin	28,558	48.7	+5.3	Not Elected

=== 1955–2019 ===
Labour Candidates Stroud Constituency 1955 to 2019
Election Year	Candidate name	Votes	%	±%	Comments
1955	Richard W. Evely	19,375	41.1		Not Elected
1959	Alfred Evans	18,336	37.6	-3.5	Not Elected Later MP for Caerphilly
1964	Dennis V. Hunt	18,889	38.2	+0.6	Not Elected
1966	Tom Cox	20,259	40.1	+1.9	Not Elected Later MP for Tooting
1970	R. Derek Wheatley	19,158	36.1	-4	Not Elected
Feb 1974	William (Bill) H Maddocks	17,148	29.2	-6.9	Not Elected
Oct 1974	William (Bill) H Maddocks	17,352	31.1	+1.9	Not Elected
1979	B.J. Marshall	17,037	27.5	-3.6	Not Elected
1983	D.R. Parsons	10.141	16.8	-3.0	Not Elected
1987	Tom Levitt	12,145	18.5	+1.7	Not Elected Later MP for High Peak
1992	David Drew	18,706	26.9	+8.4	Not Elected
1997	David Drew	26,170	42.7	+13.3	Elected
2001	David Drew	25,685	46.6	+3.9	Elected
2005	David Drew	22,527	39.6	-7.0	Elected
2010	David Drew	22,380	38.6	-1.5	Not Elected
2015	David Drew	22,947	37.7	-0.9	Not Elected
2017	David Drew	29,994	47	+9.3	Elected
2019	David Drew	27,742	42.1	-4.9	Not Elected
2024	Simon Opher	25,607	46.4	+4.8	Elected

== Prominent activists ==
Prominent activists
Name	Area Associated with	Year born	Year Died	Years active	Obituary and Comments
Joseph Alpass	Berkeley	1873	1969	1895–1950	Originally an ILP activist in 1895, Later MP for Thornbury See Wikipedia entry Joseph Alpass
Frederick William Harper	Rodborough	1868	1961	1907–1961	Birmingham Daily Post 11 May 1961 p. 18 Rodborough Parish from 1907 Stroud RDC from 1917, originally a Liberal. Said to be one of the Labour Party founders more than 50 years ago "remaining a leader for many years".
William (Bill) H Maddocks	Leonard Stanley				
Pat Parker	Cainscross				Councillor from 1960s to 1983
Walter K Preston	Trinity then Cainscross	1915	NK	1948–1993	A leading member of Stroud UDC from 1940s and joined SDC when it formed in 1973 and retired in 1983. Walter Preston Court, Cashes Green was named in his honour, while he was still living. He was also Constituency Chair for some time.
Mary Maureen Rutter	Cainscross	1925	2015	1981–2009	Stroud News and Journal 21 October 2015 A member of the County Council for 28 years, she was the First Woman Chair of the Council and her service included Labour Group Leader, Cabinet Member for Adult Social Care.
Mary Sollars	Hinton(Sharpness)	1938?			Served on SDC from 1973 to 1983, she and her husband were stalwarts in the Berkeley area for many years.
