= 2002 Stroud District Council election =

2002 UK local government election

Results of the 2002 Stroud District Council election

The 2002 Stroud District Council election took place on 2 May 2002 to elect members of Stroud District Council in Gloucestershire, England. The whole council was up for election with boundary changes since the last election in 2000 reducing the number of seats by 4. The Conservative Party gained overall control of the council from no overall control.

== Election results ==
Before the election the Conservatives were the largest party on the council with 24 seats, 4 seats short of having a majority. The results saw the Conservatives gain control of the council after Labour lost seats. Overall turnout in the election was 39.83%.

Stroud local election result 2002
Party	Seats	Gains	Losses	Net gain/loss	Seats %	Votes %	Votes	+/−
Conservative	29			+5	56.9	41.5	26,705	-4.2
Labour	12			-6	23.5	28.9	18,592	+2.4
Liberal Democrats	4			-1	7.8	16.3	10,471	-3.9
Green	4			0	7.8	10.4	6,693	+5.5
Independent	2			-2	3.9	2.4	1,533	+0.5
UKIP	0			0	0.0	0.6	365	+0.1

== Ward results ==
Amberley and Woodchester
Party	Candidate	Votes	%	±%
Conservative	Stephen Glanfield	480	53.9	
Green	Sheila Macfadyen	160	18.0	
Liberal Democrats	Margaret Edmunds	134	15.1	
Labour	John Appleton	116	13.0	
Majority		320	36.0	
Turnout		890	50.9	

Berkeley Vale (2)
Party	Candidate	Votes	%	±%
Conservative	Robert Winter	659		
Conservative	Benjamin Francis	619		
Labour	David Shaw	600		
Labour	Michael Denning	572		
Turnout		2,450	39.3	

Bisley
Party	Candidate	Votes	%	±%
Conservative	Daniel Fleming	436	49.3	
Green	Steven Penny	388	43.9	
UKIP	Anthony Gardiner	60	6.8	
Majority		48	5.4	
Turnout		884	50.9	

Cainscross (3)
Party	Candidate	Votes	%	±%
Labour	Robert Eccles	961	53.4	
Labour	Andrew Read	815	45.3	
Labour	Anthony Shortt	716	39.8	
Conservative	Norma Rodman	384	21.3	
Liberal Democrats	Darren Jones	374	20.8	
Liberal Democrats	Graham Lloyd-Jones	334	18.6	
Independent	Graham Stanley	329	18.3	
Liberal Democrats	Hilary Howe	328	18.2	
Conservative	Ann Kendall	321	17.8	
Conservative	Ralph Kenber	282	15.7	
Green	Philip Williams	133	7.4	
Green	Martin Jakes	112	6.2	
Turnout		1,800	35.4	

Cam East (2)
Party	Candidate	Votes	%	±%
Conservative	John Hudson	537	39.5	
Labour	Miranda Clifton	520	38.2	
Conservative	William Fearnley-Whittingstall	504	37.0	
Labour	William Hamilton	444	32.6	
Liberal Democrats	Charles Hartley	343	25.2	
Liberal Democrats	Keith Pearce	329	24.2	
Turnout		1,361	41.2	

Cam West (2)
Party	Candidate	Votes	%	±%
Liberal Democrats	Dennis Andrewartha	631	50.0	
Labour	John Fowles	485	38.4	
Liberal Democrats	John Dapling	449	35.6	
Labour	Daryl Matthews	372	29.5	
Conservative	Gail Fearnley-Whittingstall	242	19.2	
Conservative	Desmond Lashbrook	187	14.8	
Turnout		1,263	38.4	

Central
Party	Candidate	Votes	%	±%
Conservative	Michael Williams	273	52.3	
Labour	Ronald Nichols	148	28.4	
Green	David Michael	101	19.3	
Majority		125	23.9	
Turnout		522	37.7	

Chalford (3)
Party	Candidate	Votes	%	±%
Conservative	Charles Fellows	941	49.6	
Conservative	Susan Fellows	887	46.8	
Conservative	Elizabeth Peters	743	39.2	
Labour	David Taylor	522	27.5	
Liberal Democrats	Barbara Brown	487	25.7	
Labour	Jamila Gavin	473	24.9	
Green	David Wood	399	21.0	
Green	Catherine Shuckburgh	352	18.6	
Green	Mark Epton	232	12.2	
UKIP	Leslie Banstead	192	10.1	
Turnout		1,897	38.4	

Coaley and Uley
Party	Candidate	Votes	%	±%
Independent	Janet Wood	574	54.2	
Conservative	Caroline Chisolm	352	33.2	
Labour	George East	71	6.7	
Green	Janet Griffiths	63	5.9	
Majority		222	20.9	
Turnout		1,060	57.6	

Dursley (3)
Party	Candidate	Votes	%	±%
Conservative	Basil Allen	723	41.1	
Labour	Hilary Fowles	683	38.8	
Conservative	Loraine Patrick	600	34.1	
Liberal Democrats	Brian Marsh	573	32.5	
Labour	Paul Denney	548	31.1	
Liberal Democrats	Veronica Harding	528	30.0	
Labour	Paul Mapplebeck	525	29.8	
Conservative	Terence Morgan	499	28.3	
Liberal Democrats	Patrick Blitz	497	28.2	
Turnout		1,761	38.5	

Eastington and Standish
Party	Candidate	Votes	%	±%
Labour	Kenneth Stephens	282	47.5	
Conservative	Thomas James	228	38.4	
Green	Valerie Hicken	84	14.1	
Majority		54	9.1	
Turnout		594	39.8	

Farmhill and Paganhill
Party	Candidate	Votes	%	±%
Independent	Sheffie Mohammed	292	55.6	
Labour	Andy Treacher	82	15.6	
Conservative	Catherine James	74	14.1	
Liberal Democrats	Deborah Sutherland	55	10.5	
Green	Annabel Caddle	22	4.2	
Majority		210	40.0	
Turnout		525	30.2	

Hardwicke (2)
Party	Candidate	Votes	%	±%
Conservative	Graham Littleton	711	63.4	
Conservative	David Tomlins	641	57.2	
Labour	Catherine Moore	395	35.2	
Turnout		1,121	31.2	

Kingswood
Party	Candidate	Votes	%	±%
Liberal Democrats	Paul Hemming	408	72.7	
Conservative	Brenda Lock	153	27.3	
Majority		255	45.5	
Turnout		561	36.4	

Minchinhampton (2)
Party	Candidate	Votes	%	±%
Conservative	Dorcas Binns	888	61.2	
Conservative	Elisabeth Bird	874	60.3	
Labour	Martin Alder	356	24.6	
Green	Oscar Hull	140	9.7	
UKIP	Adrian Blake	113	7.8	
Labour	David Griffiths	113	7.8	
Green	Elizabeth Cranston	111	7.7	
Turnout		1,450	36.4	

Nailsworth (3)
Party	Candidate	Votes	%	±%
Conservative	Sybil Bruce	777	38.4	
Conservative	Mohammed Akhtar	716	35.3	
Conservative	John Jeffreys	668	33.0	
Labour	Keith Norbury	591	29.2	
Green	Sue Limb	571	28.2	
Labour	John Lewis	565	27.9	
Labour	Audrey Smith	555	27.4	
Green	Lydia Eeles	521	25.7	
Green	James Hepburn	437	21.6	
Liberal Democrats	Collen Rothwell	289	14.3	
Turnout		2,026	41.5	

Over Stroud
Party	Candidate	Votes	%	±%
Labour	Linda Durrans	240	41.0	
Conservative	Linda Jeffreys	236	40.3	
Green	Kate Corder	109	18.6	
Majority		4	0.7	
Turnout		585	41.0	

Painswick (2)
Party	Candidate	Votes	%	±%
Conservative	John Stephenson-Oliver	1,129	65.8	
Conservative	Barbara Tait	1,101	64.1	
Green	Wendy Fontaine	315	18.3	
Labour	Henrietta Nichols	251	14.6	
Labour	John Rhodes	234	13.6	
Turnout		1,717	50.4	

Rodborough (2)
Party	Candidate	Votes	%	±%
Conservative	Graham Blackshaw	544	41.9	
Conservative	Nigel Cooper	488	37.6	
Labour	Roger Brown	436	33.6	
Labour	Helen Hughes	417	32.1	
Green	Carol Kambites	188	14.5	
Liberal Democrats	Andrew Fisk	183	14.1	
Liberal Democrats	Adrian Walker-Smith	151	11.6	
Green	Ewout Granberg	124	9.5	
Turnout		1,299	36.7	

Severn (2)
Party	Candidate	Votes	%	±%
Conservative	John Jones	755	50.3	
Conservative	Norman Smith	725	48.3	
Liberal Democrats	John Howe	457	30.4	
Liberal Democrats	Michael Stayte	409	27.2	
Labour	John Greenwood	319	21.2	
Labour	Geoffrey Wheeler	236	15.7	
Turnout		1,502	42.5	

Slade
Party	Candidate	Votes	%	±%
Green	Gwendoline Belcher	236	42.7	
Labour	Charles Townley	175	31.6	
Conservative	Laurence Carmichael	142	25.7	
Majority		61	11.0	
Turnout		553	33.1	

Stonehouse (3)
Party	Candidate	Votes	%	±%
Labour	Leslie Williams	1,045	58.8	
Labour	Mattie Ross	1,024	57.6	
Labour	Christopher Brine	982	55.3	
Conservative	Philip Bevan	559	31.5	
Conservative	Lawrence Hall	434	24.4	
Conservative	Prudence Vernon	353	19.9	
Green	John Harris	200	11.3	
Green	Sally Pickering	200	11.3	
Green	Pamela May	182	10.2	
Turnout		1,777	31.9	

The Stanleys (2)
Party	Candidate	Votes	%	±%
Conservative	Nigel Studdert-Kennedy	609	41.7	
Conservative	Raymond Apperley	556	38.0	
Labour	Lesley Williams	527	36.0	
Liberal Democrats	Phillip Herbert	405	27.7	
Independent	Elizabeth Stanley	194	13.3	
Labour	Thomas Williams	173	11.8	
Green	Peter Adams	152	10.4	
Turnout		1,462	42.7	

Thrupp
Party	Candidate	Votes	%	±%
Green	Martin Whiteside	339	39.7	
Conservative	Roy Nicholas	298	34.9	
Labour	John Howgate	217	25.4	
Majority		41	4.8	
Turnout		854	47.8	

Trinity
Party	Candidate	Votes	%	±%
Green	John Marjoram	367	69.0	
Labour	Marta Cock	133	25.0	
Liberal Democrats	Paul Hodgkinson	32	6.0	
Majority		234	44.0	
Turnout		532	46.7	

Uplands
Party	Candidate	Votes	%	±%
Labour	Linda Townley	206	36.1	
Conservative	Rodger Cuddington	158	27.7	
Independent	Donald Peters	144	25.2	
Green	Henry Leveson-Gower	63	11.0	
Majority		48	8.4	
Turnout		571	33.1	

Upton St Leonards
Party	Candidate	Votes	%	±%
Conservative	Michael Beard	444	57.4	
Green	Gillian Stott	175	22.6	
Labour	John Bell	154	19.9	
Majority		269	34.8	
Turnout		773	42.9	

Vale
Party	Candidate	Votes	%	±%
Conservative	David Wride	536	77.6	
Labour	Stephen Turner	155	22.4	
Majority		381	55.1	
Turnout		691	48.1	

Valley
Party	Candidate	Votes	%	±%
Green	Tobias Green	217	37.5	
Labour	Charles Burling	158	27.3	
Conservative	Sylvia Kania	112	19.3	
Liberal Democrats	Barrie Pierce	92	15.9	
Majority		59	10.2	
Turnout		57.9	34.9	

Wotton-under-Edge (3)
Party	Candidate	Votes	%	±%
Liberal Democrats	June Cordwell	1,159	62.3	
Liberal Democrats	Christopher Galbraith	1,077	57.9	
Conservative	Sidney Gowers	998	53.6	
Liberal Democrats	Ethel Woodhead	747	40.1	
Conservative	Daniel Lord	622	33.4	
Conservative	Sarah Munoz-Echverria	507	27.2	
Turnout		1,861	37.6	
