= 2006 Stroud District Council election =

2006 UK local government election

Results of the 2006 Stroud District Council election

The 2006 Stroud Council election took place on 4 May 2006 to elect members of Stroud District Council in Gloucestershire, England. One third of the council was up for election and the Conservative Party stayed in overall control of the council.

After the election, the composition of the council was

- Conservative 29
- Labour 9
- Liberal Democrat 5
- Green 5
- Independent 3

== Election result ==
The results saw the Conservative Party increase their majority on the council after gaining 2 seats. The Conservatives gained a seat in Cainscross from the Labour Party and Wotton-under-Edge from the Liberal Democrats, while holding the other 11 seats they had been defending. Meanwhile, the Greens gained Over Stroud from the Labour Party and came within 70 votes of taking Nailsworth from the Conservatives. This meant the Greens had 5 seats after the election, the same number as the Liberal Democrats. Overall turnout in the election was 42.16%, a little above the national average.

Stroud local election result 2006
Party	Seats	Gains	Losses	Net gain/loss	Seats %	Votes %	Votes	+/−
Conservative	13	2	0	+2	72.2	47.4	12,856	+5.4%
Labour	2	0	2	-2	11.1	21.1	5,736	+0.0%
Liberal Democrats	1	0	1	-1	5.6	17.0	4,613	-2.2%
Green	1	1	0	+1	5.6	12.2	3,318	-1.9%
Independent	1	0	0	0	5.6	2.3	613	+1.3%

== Ward results ==
Berkeley
Party	Candidate	Votes	%	±%
Conservative	John Stanton	805	61.0	+10.8
Labour	Michael Denning	342	25.9	−4.4
Liberal Democrats	Graham Lloyd-Jones	173	13.1	+1.6
Majority		463	35.1	+15.2
Turnout		1,320	40.9	
Conservative hold		Swing		

Bisley
Party	Candidate	Votes	%	±%
Conservative	Patricia Carrick	586	63.4	+14.1
Green	Simon Laverack	219	23.7	−20.2
Liberal Democrats	Charles Hartley	77	8.3	+8.3
Labour	Henrietta Nichols	43	4.6	+4.6
Majority		367	39.7	+34.3
Turnout		925	51.9	+1.0
Conservative hold		Swing		

Cainscross (2)
Party	Candidate	Votes	%	±%
Labour	Karon Cross	733		
Conservative	Laurence Carmichael	664		
Labour	Thomas Williams	603		
Conservative	Jason Bullingham	584		
Green	Helen Royall	375		
Liberal Democrats	Sylvia Bridgland	254		
Liberal Democrats	Andrew Fisk	251		
Turnout		3,464	35.3	
Labour hold		Swing		
Conservative gain from Labour		Swing		

Cam East
Party	Candidate	Votes	%	±%
Conservative	John Hudson	683	49.9	+11.9
Labour	Daryl Matthews	401	29.3	−11.1
Liberal Democrats	John Howe	284	20.8	−0.8
Majority		282	20.6	
Turnout		1,368	42.4	+2.7
Conservative hold		Swing		

Cam West
Party	Candidate	Votes	%	±%
Liberal Democrats	Dennis Andrewartha	621	53.9	+14.3
Conservative	Brian Tipper	268	23.2	+4.7
Labour	Stephen Ballard	264	22.9	−18.9
Majority		353	30.6	
Turnout		1,153	36.7	+0.8
Liberal Democrats hold		Swing		

Chalford
Party	Candidate	Votes	%	±%
Conservative	Charles Fellows	1,100	54.3	+12.6
Green	David Wood	447	22.1	+3.1
Liberal Democrats	John Freeman	259	12.8	−2.6
Labour	Clare Jackson	220	10.9	−0.9
Majority		653	32.2	+9.6
Turnout		2,026	41.8	
Conservative hold		Swing		

Coaley and Uley
Party	Candidate	Votes	%	±%
Independent	Janet Wood	613	55.9	+1.7
Conservative	Lynette Wilcox	384	35.0	+1.8
Labour	Patricia Leonard	99	9.0	+2.3
Majority		229	20.9	+0.0
Turnout		1,096	51.6	−6.0
Independent hold		Swing		

Dursley
Party	Candidate	Votes	%	±%
Conservative	Timothy Frankau	816	42.6	+12.5
Labour	Geoffrey Wheeler	639	33.3	+0.6
Liberal Democrats	Veronica Collins	462	24.1	+0.9
Majority		177	9.2	
Turnout		1,917	42.9	
Conservative hold		Swing		

Hardwicke
Party	Candidate	Votes	%	±%
Conservative	Graham Littleton	889	68.4	+8.5
Liberal Democrats	Milner Howe	221	17.0	−2.3
Labour	Ela Pathak-Sen	190	14.6	−6.2
Majority		668	51.4	+12.3
Turnout		1,300	35.6	
Conservative hold		Swing		

Nailsworth
Party	Candidate	Votes	%	±%
Conservative	Sybil Bruce	877	39.2	+3.4
Green	Piers Clifford	807	36.0	+4.2
Labour	Audrey Smith	316	14.1	−2.4
Liberal Democrats	John Bowen	240	10.7	+2.3
Majority		70	3.1	−0.9
Turnout		2,240	46.1	
Conservative hold		Swing		

Over Stroud
Party	Candidate	Votes	%	±%
Green	Philip Booth	418	55.8	+37.2
Conservative	Norma Rodman	214	28.6	−11.7
Labour	Linda Durrans	71	9.5	−31.5
Liberal Democrats	Colleen Rothwell	46	6.1	+6.1
Majority		204	27.2	
Turnout		749	51.6	+10.6
Green gain from Labour		Swing		

Painswick
Party	Candidate	Votes	%	±%
Conservative	Frances Roden	1,160	67.1	+11.7
Green	Fiona Ritchie	385	22.3	−0.5
Labour	Sally Thorpe	185	10.7	+4.4
Majority		775	44.8	+12.1
Turnout		1,730	50.3	
Conservative hold		Swing		

Severn
Party	Candidate	Votes	%	±%
Conservative	John Jones	896	57.5	+4.4
Liberal Democrats	Michael Stayte	413	26.5	−2.6
Labour	John Greenwood	248	14.9	−2.9
Majority		483	31.0	+7.0
Turnout		1,557	42.9	
Conservative hold		Swing		

Stonehouse
Party	Candidate	Votes	%	±%
Labour	Leslie Williams	835	43.0	−2.6
Conservative	Philip Bevan	712	36.6	+0.9
Green	Clare Sheridan	263	13.5	+4.8
Liberal Democrats	Margaret Edmunds	134	6.9	−3.1
Majority		123	6.3	−3.6
Turnout		1,944	34.3	
Labour hold		Swing		

The Stanleys
Party	Candidate	Votes	%	±%
Conservative	Nigel Studdert-Kennedy	754	53.7	+11.0
Labour	Miranda Williams	276	19.7	−1.5
Liberal Democrats	Ian Owen	192	13.7	−4.7
Green	Sue Drennen	181	12.9	−4.8
Majority		478	34.1	+12.6
Turnout		1,403	43.0	
Conservative hold		Swing		

Vale
Party	Candidate	Votes	%	±%
Conservative	David Wride	553	76.0	−1.6
Liberal Democrats	Patrick Blitz	105	14.4	+14.4
Labour	Douglas Blackstock	70	9.6	−12.8
Majority		448	61.5	+6.4
Turnout		728	49.1	+1.0
Conservative hold		Swing		

Wotton-Under-Edge
Party	Candidate	Votes	%	±%
Conservative	Christopher Routledge	911	41.1	+0.4
Liberal Democrats	June Cordwell	881	39.8	+2.2
Green	Clive Phillips	223	10.1	−0.3
Labour	Helen Roberts	201	9.1	−2.2
Majority		30	1.4	−1.7
Turnout		2,216	44.4	
Conservative gain from Liberal Democrats		Swing		
