= 2008 Stroud District Council election =

2008 UK local government election

Results of the 2008 Stroud District Council election

The 2008 Stroud Council election took place on 1 May 2008 to elect members of Stroud District Council in Gloucestershire, England. One third of the council was up for election and the Conservative Party stayed in overall control of the council.

After the election, the composition of the council was:

- Conservative 31
- Labour 7
- Green 6
- Liberal Democrat 5
- Independent 2

== Background ==
Before the election the council had 31 Conservative, 9 Labour, 5 Green, 4 Liberal Democrat and 2 independents. 61 candidates stood for the 17 seats that were being contested, with the Green Party contesting every seat for the first time. Councillors standing down at the election included Conservative Sue Fellows and the Labour Party's Hilary Fowles and Mattie Ross.

== Election results ==
The results saw the Conservatives stay in control with 31 seats, after both gaining and losing 2 seats, while increasing their vote share to 51%. The Conservatives gained the seats of Dursley and Stonehouse from Labour, after the sitting Labour councillors had stood down, reducing Labour to 7 seats. However the Conservatives also lost Nailsworth by 28 votes to the Greens and Wotton-under-Edge by 25 votes to the Liberal Democrats. This meant the Greens went up to 6 seats and the Liberal Democrats up to 5 seats, while there remained 2 independents who had not defended seats in the election. Turnout in the election varied from a high of 50.03% in Painswick to a low of 33% in Cainscross.

The local Labour member of parliament David Drew blamed the defeats for Labour on "general disillusionment with the Government" and the issues of government assistance after the 2007 floods and the abolition of the 10 pence income tax rate.

Stroud local election result 2008
Party	Seats	Gains	Losses	Net gain/loss	Seats %	Votes %	Votes	+/−
Conservative	12	2	2	0	70.6	51.2	13,231	+10.8
Labour	2	0	2	-2	11.8	17.4	4,491	-5.7
Liberal Democrats	2	1	0	+1	11.8	12.2	3,142	-1.3
Green	1	1	0	+1	5.9	17.8	4,595	-1.1
UKIP	0	0	0	0	0.0	1.2	300	-0.5
BNP	0	0	0	0	0.0	0.3	67	+0.3

== Ward results ==
Amberley and Woodchester
Party	Candidate	Votes	%	±%
Conservative	Stephen Glanfield	452	54.3	−1.7
Green	Jennifer Whiskerd	151	18.1	+2.6
Labour	Jo Smith	131	15.7	+0.8
Liberal Democrats	Adrian Walker-Smith	98	11.8	−1.8
Majority		301	36.2	−4.2
Turnout		832	49.4	
Conservative hold		Swing		

Berkeley
Party	Candidate	Votes	%	±%
Conservative	Tim Archer	861	67.2	−2.7
Labour	Geoffrey Wheeler	295	23.0	−7.1
Green	Chris Keppie	126	9.8	+9.8
Majority		566	44.1	+4.4
Turnout		1,282	39.0	−0.9
Conservative hold		Swing		

Cainscross
Party	Candidate	Votes	%	±%
Labour	Tom Williams	757	42.2	−7.1
Conservative	Norma Rodman	648	36.2	+1.4
Green	Helen Royall	195	10.9	−5.0
Liberal Democrats	Sylvia Bridgland	192	10.7	+10.7
Majority		109	6.1	−8.4
Turnout		1,792	33.3	−3.2
Labour hold		Swing		

Chalford
Party	Candidate	Votes	%	±%
Conservative	Debbie Young	1,217	56.2	+0.9
Green	Carolyn Billingsley	633	29.2	+4.8
Labour	Malcolm Perry	195	9.0	−3.4
UKIP	Leslie Banstead	121	5.6	−2.2
Majority		584	27.0	−3.9
Turnout		2,166	43.2	+2.8
Conservative hold		Swing		

Dursley
Party	Candidate	Votes	%	±%
Conservative	Alex Stennett	647	34.4	−0.1
Liberal Democrats	Brian Marsh	608	32.3	+0.5
Labour	Daryl Matthews	531	28.2	−5.5
Green	Gillian Stott	97	5.2	+5.2
Majority		39	2.1	+1.4
Turnout		1,883	39.0	−1.9
Conservative gain from Labour		Swing		

Eastington and Standish
Party	Candidate	Votes	%	±%
Labour	Ken Stephens	288	44.5	+3.4
Conservative	Ian Robinson	277	42.8	+3.4
Green	Gerald Hartley	82	12.7	+2.1
Majority		11	1.7	+0.0
Turnout		647	45.9	
Labour hold		Swing		

Hardwicke
Party	Candidate	Votes	%	±%
Conservative	Len Tomlins	875	69.3	+0.9
Labour	Miranda Williams	227	18.0	+3.4
Green	Sally Pickering	160	12.7	+12.7
Majority		648	51.3	−0.1
Turnout		1,262	33.8	−1.8
Conservative hold		Swing		

Kingswood
Party	Candidate	Votes	%	±%
Liberal Democrats	Paul Hemming	309	50.3	−0.7
Conservative	Michael Howard	187	30.5	−12.1
Green	Sue Fleming	118	19.2	+19.2
Majority		122	19.9	+11.5
Turnout		614	40.3	
Liberal Democrats hold		Swing		

Minchinhampton
Party	Candidate	Votes	%	±%
Conservative	Joe Forbes	1,112	71.2	+8.0
Green	Marie Gwynn	275	17.6	+6.3
Labour	Joan Moore	175	11.2	−1.0
Majority		837	53.6	+3.7
Turnout		1,562	44.6	−4.5
Conservative hold		Swing		

Nailsworth
Party	Candidate	Votes	%	±%
Green	Fi MacMillan	1,028	43.1	+5.2
Conservative	Dorcas Binns	1,000	41.9	+3.5
Labour	Sally Thorpe	229	9.6	−3.7
BNP	Alan Lomas	67	2.8	+2.8
UKIP	Maureen Upchurch	61	2.6	−2.7
Majority		28	1.2	
Turnout		2,385	46.4	+2.6
Green gain from Conservative		Swing		

Painswick
Party	Candidate	Votes	%	±%
Conservative	Barbara Tait	1,228	69.0	+1.9
Green	Elinor Croxall	371	20.8	−1.5
Labour	David Heyes	181	10.2	−0.5
Majority		857	48.1	+3.3
Turnout		1,780	50.0	−0.3
Conservative hold		Swing		

Rodborough
Party	Candidate	Votes	%	±%
Conservative	Nigel Cooper	516	32.1	+1.7
Liberal Democrats	Andrew Fisk	465	29.0	−1.8
Green	Phil Blomberg	446	27.8	+1.7
Labour	John Appleton	178	11.1	−1.6
Majority		51	3.2	
Turnout		1,605	46.4	+1.7
Conservative hold		Swing		

Severn
Party	Candidate	Votes	%	±%
Conservative	Norman-Leonard Smith	961	60.6	+3.1
Liberal Democrats	John Howe	306	19.3	−7.2
Labour	John Greenwood	206	13.0	−1.9
Green	Annie Finlay-Trotter	114	7.2	+7.2
Majority		655	41.3	+10.3
Turnout		1,587	42.9	+0.0
Conservative hold		Swing		

Stonehouse
Party	Candidate	Votes	%	±%
Conservative	Phil Bevan	843	42.1	+5.1
Labour	Gary Powell	806	40.2	−1.1
Green	Clare Sheridan	237	11.8	−2.1
UKIP	Adrian Blake	118	5.9	−1.8
Majority		37	1.8	
Turnout		2,004	34.1	−1.5
Conservative gain from Labour		Swing		

The Stanleys
Party	Candidate	Votes	%	±%
Conservative	Ray Apperley	718	52.3	−1.4
Labour	Lesley Williams	316	23.0	+3.3
Green	Tony Mcnulty	190	13.8	+0.9
Liberal Democrats	Gavin Owen	150	10.9	−2.8
Majority		402	29.3	−4.8
Turnout		1,374	41.2	−1.8
Conservative hold		Swing		

Upton St Leonards
Party	Candidate	Votes	%	±%
Conservative	Keith Pearson	710	78.9	+0.4
Green	Peter Adams	114	12.7	+12.7
Labour	Ela Pathak-Sen	76	8.4	−13.1
Majority		596	66.2	+9.3
Turnout		900	48.9	+1.3
Conservative hold		Swing		

Wotton-Under-Edge
Party	Candidate	Votes	%	±%
Liberal Democrats	June Cordwell	1,014	45.0	−7.2
Conservative	John Gowers	979	43.5	+18.4
Green	Martin Harvey	258	11.5	−5.5
Majority		35	1.6	−25.5
Turnout		2,251	45.0	−0.9
Liberal Democrats gain from Conservative		Swing		
