= 2021 Stroud District Council election =

2021 UK local government election

- 6 May 2021

All 51 seats to Stroud District Council 26 seats needed for a majority

	First party	Second party
Party	Conservative	Labour
Last election	23 seats, 30.8%	18 seats, 28.3%
Seats won	20	15
Seat change	▼3	▼3
Popular vote	17,156	13,355
Percentage	34.4%	25.8%
Swing	▲3.6%	▼1.5%
	Third party	Fourth party
Party	Green	Liberal Democrats
Last election	8 seats, 23.7%	2 seats, 8.8%
Seats won	13	3
Seat change	▲5	▲1
Popular vote	15,116	3,607
Percentage	30.3%	7.2%
Swing	▲6.6%	▼1.6%
- Map showing the results of the 2021 Stroud District Council election
Council control before election
No overall control
Council control after election
No overall control

The 2021 Stroud District Council election took place on 6 May 2021 to elect members of Stroud District Council in England. This was on the same day as other local elections.

== Summary ==
=== Election result ===
2021 Stroud District Council election
Party	Candidates	Seats	Gains	Losses	Net gain/loss	Seats %	Votes %	Votes	+/−
Conservative	51	20	4	7	▼3	39.2	34.4	17,156	▲3.6
Green	32	13	6	1	▲5	25.5	30.3	15,116	▲6.6
Labour	35	15	3	6	▼3	29.4	26.8	13,355	▼1.5
Liberal Democrats	10	3	1	0	▲1	5.9	7.2	3,607	▼1.6
Independent	1	0	0	0	Steady	0.0	0.8	382	▼4.9
TUSC	5	0	0	0	Steady	0.0	0.2	117	▼0.1
Libertarian	1	0	0	0	Steady	0.0	0.1	61	N/A
Heritage	1	0	0	0	Steady	0.0	0.1	58	N/A

== Ward results ==
=== Amberley & Woodchester ===
Amberley & Woodchester
Party	Candidate	Votes	%	±%
Labour	Ashley Smith	537	51.6	+14.5
Conservative	John Copley	503	48.4	+2.7
Majority		34	3.2	
Turnout		1,050	59.0	
Labour gain from Conservative		Swing		

=== Berkeley Vale ===
Berkeley Vale (3 seats)
Party	Candidate	Votes	%	±%
Conservative	Gordon Craig*	1,415	57.0	+4.8
Conservative	Lindsey Green	1,345	54.2	+6.4
Conservative	Haydn Jones*	1,170	47.2	+4.3
Labour	Elizabeth Ashton	768	31.0	−7.8
Green	David Lungley	435	17.5	+8.2
Labour	Keith Terry	404	16.3	−11.1
Liberal Democrats	Nicholas Easby	370	14.9	+2.0
Turnout		2,481	42.0	
Conservative hold				
Conservative hold				
Conservative hold				

=== Bisley ===
Bisley
Party	Candidate	Votes	%	±%
Green	Martin Brown	550	53.6	+22.5
Conservative	Timothy Williams*	476	46.4	−10.8
Majority		74	7.2	
Turnout		1,035	57.0	
Green gain from Conservative		Swing		

=== Cainscross ===
Cainscross (3 seats)
Party	Candidate	Votes	%	±%
Labour	Jenny Miles*	767	33.9	−9.9
Labour	Jessie Hoskin	754	33.4	−10.4
Conservative	Katrina Davis	685	30.3	+7.2
Labour	Thomas Williams*	644	28.5	−8.2
Conservative	George Williams	643	28.5	+9.3
Conservative	Anthony Malpass	468	20.7	+1.5
Green	Steven Naumann	420	18.6	−5.0
Green	Geoffrey Kayum	391	17.3	N/A
Independent	Graham Stanley	382	16.9	+0.4
Green	Roderick Nelson	341	15.1	N/A
Heritage	Richard Nurse	58	2.6	N/A
TUSC	Raymond Darlington	41	1.8	+0.4
Turnout		2,260	39.0	
Labour hold				
Labour hold				
Conservative gain from Labour				

=== Cam East ===
Cam East (2 seats)
Party	Candidate	Votes	%	±%
Conservative	Brian Tipper*	825	49.3	+0.5
Conservative	Victoria Gray	779	46.5	+8.8
Labour	Nera Cornell	454	27.1	−24.1
Labour	Robert Blenkinsop	401	23.9	−12.9
Liberal Democrats	Richard Blackwell-Whitehead	293	17.5	N/A
Turnout		1,675	45.0	
Conservative gain from Labour				
Conservative hold				

=== Cam West ===
Cam West (2 seats)
Party	Candidate	Votes	%	±%
Conservative	Christopher Evans	593	43.8	−0.2
Labour	Colin Fryer	589	43.5	−4.6
Conservative	Jonathan Fulcher	464	34.3	−7.1
Labour	Anja Rowston	393	29.0	−15.0
Liberal Democrats	Elaine Jewell	143	10.6	N/A
TUSC	Lucia Jayaseelanvictor	15	1.1	N/A
Turnout		1,354	41.0	
Conservative hold				
Labour hold				

=== Chalford ===
Chalford (3 seats)
Party	Candidate	Votes	%	±%
Green	Patricia Watson	1,399	50.0	+11.9
Green	Christopher Jockel	1,314	47.0	N/A
Labour Co-op	Helen Fenton	1,018	36.4	−1.2
Conservative	Anthony Pilkington	960	34.3	−9.4
Conservative	Lewis McQueer	926	33.1	−10.5
Conservative	Christopher Lester	830	29.7	−12.8
Turnout		2,796	53.0	
Green gain from Conservative				
Green gain from Conservative				
Labour Co-op gain from Conservative				

=== Coaley & Uley ===
Coaley & Uley
Party	Candidate	Votes	%	±%
Green	Martin Pearcy	606	55.1	+2.2
Conservative	Victoria Newman	494	44.9	+10.1
Majority		112	10.2	
Turnout		1,110	55.0	
Green hold				

=== Dursley ===
Dursley (3 seats)
Party	Candidate	Votes	%	±%
Labour	Trevor Hall	999	42.9	−1.2
Labour	Doina Cornell*	973	41.8	−6.5
Conservative	Loraine Patrick	921	39.6	+7.3
Labour	Danae Savvidou	843	36.2	−3.1
Conservative	Alexander Stennett	770	33.1	+2.9
Conservative	Tracey Viney	713	30.6	+1.3
Green	Benjamin Bywater	467	20.1	+1.5
Green	James Broady	329	14.1	N/A
Turnout		2,328	41.0	
Labour hold				
Labour hold				
Conservative gain from Labour				

=== Hardwicke ===
Hardwicke (3 seats)
Party	Candidate	Votes	%	±%
Conservative	Gillian Oxley*	1,211	56.5	+1.6
Conservative	David Mossman*	979	45.6	−10.5
Conservative	Mark Ryder	860	40.1	−1.3
Green	Peter Adams	555	25.9	−1.9
Labour	John Callinan	536	25.0	−2.3
Green	John Robinthwaite	500	23.3	N/A
Turnout		2,145	35.0	
Conservative hold				
Conservative hold				
Conservative hold				

=== Kingswood ===
Kingswood
Party	Candidate	Votes	%	±%
Liberal Democrats	Richard Wilsher	515	58.9	+18.1
Conservative	Charles Tuffin	284	32.5	−15.8
Labour	David Carter	75	8.6	N/A
Majority		231	26.4	
Turnout		879	49.0	
Liberal Democrats gain from Conservative				

=== Minchinhampton ===
Minchinhampton (2 seats)
Party	Candidate	Votes	%	±%
Green	Chloe Turner	1,190	58.7	+38.5
Conservative	Nicholas Hurst*	986	48.6	−1.1
Labour	Mark Huband	443	21.9	−0.3
Conservative	David Lowin	440	21.7	−33.5
Turnout		2,027	54.0	
Green gain from Conservative				
Conservative hold				

=== Nailsworth ===
Nailsworth (3 seats)
Party	Candidate	Votes	%	±%
Labour Co-op	Stephen Robinson*	1,555	58.8	−3.3
Green	Norman Kay*	1,408	53.2	+2.6
Labour Co-op	Natalie Bennett	1,144	43.3	−14.7
Conservative	John Lockwood	712	26.9	−11.5
Conservative	Ewen Denning	666	25.2	−4.0
Conservative	Max Howells	618	23.4	−2.5
Liberal Democrats	Rhianna Wilsher	315	11.9	N/A
Turnout		2,645	50.0	
Labour Co-op hold				
Green hold				
Labour Co-op hold				

=== Painswick & Upton ===
Painswick & Upton (3 seats)
Party	Candidate	Votes	%	±%
Conservative	Jason Bullingham	1,408	46.1	−10.7
Conservative	Julie Job*	1,279	41.9	−14.9
Conservative	Keith Pearson*	1,279	41.9	−9.6
Green	Isa Clee	1,128	36.9	+2.9
Green	Gavin McClafferty	1,128	36.9	N/A
Labour	Ela Pathak-Sen	785	25.7	−2.9
Turnout		3,054	50.0	
Conservative hold				
Conservative hold				
Conservative hold				

=== Randwick, Whiteshill & Ruscombe ===
Randwick, Whiteshill & Ruscombe
Party	Candidate	Votes	%	±%
Green	Jonathan Edmunds*	706	71.9	+12.5
Conservative	Susan Williams	276	28.1	+5.7
Majority		430	43.8	
Turnout		995	56.0	
Green hold				

=== Rodborough ===
Rodborough (2 seats)
Party	Candidate	Votes	%	±%
Labour Co-op	Robin Layfield	754	41.9	−0.4
Labour Co-op	Nigel Prenter*	609	33.9	−10.8
Green	Philip Blomberg	463	25.8	+4.2
Green	Elizabeth Hillary	435	24.2	+10.9
Conservative	Elisabeth Bird	405	22.5	−5.5
Conservative	Robert Trusty	331	18.4	−1.2
Turnout		1,798	50.0	
Labour Co-op hold				
Labour Co-op hold				

=== Severn ===
Severn (2 seats)
Party	Candidate	Votes	%	±%
Conservative	Stephen Davies*	941	47.9	−1.9
Conservative	John Jones*	900	45.8	−4.1
Labour	Oakley Pollard	548	27.9	−2.9
Green	Moya Shannon	453	23.0	+2.9
Liberal Democrats	Michael Stayte	390	19.8	−4.6
Turnout		1,966	42.0	
Conservative hold				
Conservative hold				

=== Stonehouse ===
Stonehouse (3 seats)
Party	Candidate	Votes	%	±%
Labour Co-op	Christopher Brine*	840	37.9	−18.0
Conservative	Nicholas Housden	789	35.6	+12.0
Labour Co-op	Mattie Ross*	762	34.4	−19.2
Labour Co-op	Gary Powell*	678	30.6	−22.1
Conservative	Christopher Easton	655	29.6	+7.8
Conservative	Emma Porter	569	25.7	+8.2
Green	Carol Kambites	527	23.8	+5.4
Green	Sally Pickering	484	21.9	N/A
Green	Victoria Redding	308	13.9	N/A
Liberal Democrats	Robert Jewell	102	4.6	N/A
Libertarian	Glenville Gogerly	61	2.8	N/A
TUSC	Elizabeth Fletcher	41	1.9	N/A
Turnout		2,214	37.0	
Labour Co-op hold				
Conservative gain from Labour Co-op				
Labour Co-op hold				

=== Stroud Central ===
Stroud Central
Party	Candidate	Votes	%	±%
Green	Kathryn Crews	335	41.2	+2.8
Labour	Jessica McQuail	297	36.5	−2.9
Conservative	John Stanton	181	22.3	+0.2
Majority		38	4.7	
Turnout		655	37.0	
Green gain from Labour		Swing		

=== Stroud Farmhill & Paganhill ===
Stroud Farmhill & Paganhill
Party	Candidate	Votes	%	±%
Conservative	Haydn Sutton*	393	43.4	+3.6
Labour Co-op	David Drew	367	40.6	+13.0
Green	Neil Buick	145	16.0	+1.0
Majority		26	2.8	
Turnout		908	47.0	
Conservative hold		Swing		

=== Stroud Slade ===
Stroud Slade
Party	Candidate	Votes	%	±%
Labour Co-op	Laurie Davies	345	43.0	+6.0
Green	Adrian Oldman	326	40.6	−11.0
Conservative	Allison Long	117	14.6	+3.2
TUSC	Christopher Moore	14	1.7	N/A
Majority		19	2.4	
Turnout		805	44.0	
Labour Co-op gain from Green		Swing		

=== Stroud Trinity ===
Stroud Trinity
Party	Candidate	Votes	%	±%
Green	Lucas Schoemaker	475	51.9	−9.2
Labour	Sebastian Parkinson-Proudlove	290	31.7	+6.8
Conservative	Jessica Tomblin	151	16.5	+2.5
Majority		180	20.2	
Turnout		930	55.0	
Green hold		Swing		

=== Stroud Uplands ===
Stroud Uplands
Party	Candidate	Votes	%	±%
Labour	Paula Baker	329	43.8	+0.9
Green	George Richardson	220	29.3	+14.5
Conservative	Colin Chisholm	168	22.4	+11.8
Liberal Democrats	Natalie Davenport	28	3.7	N/A
TUSC	Adam Goulcher	6	0.8	N/A
Majority		109	14.5	
Turnout		759	45.0	
Labour hold		Swing		

=== Stroud Valley ===
Stroud Valley
Party	Candidate	Votes	%	±%
Green	Martin Baxendale*	438	45.6	−8.9
Labour	Megan Sheer	393	40.9	+8.5
Conservative	Sharon Sugars	130	13.5	+0.4
Majority		45	4.7	
Turnout		961	55.0	
Green hold		Swing		

=== The Stanleys ===
The Stanleys (2 seats)
Party	Candidate	Votes	%	±%
Conservative	Nigel Studdert-Kennedy*	774	41.1	−1.0
Green	Stephen Hynd	730	38.7	+19.4
Conservative	Conor Reddington	556	29.5	−7.0
Labour	Vanessa Price	540	28.6	−21.9
Labour	Andrew Theaker	360	19.1	−17.8
Turnout		1,885	50.0	
Conservative hold				
Green gain from Labour				

=== Thrupp ===
Thrupp
Party	Candidate	Votes	%	±%
Green	Rebecca Aldam	714	63.0	−6.7
Conservative	Anthony Blackburn	294	25.9	+6.8
Labour	Oisin Hayden Burrell	126	11.1	−0.1
Majority		420	37.1	
Turnout		1,138	57.0	
Green hold		Swing		

=== Wotton-under-Edge ===
Wotton-under-Edge (3 seats)
Party	Candidate	Votes	%	±%
Liberal Democrats	Kenneth Tucker*	1,451	53.6	−9.9
Green	Catherine Braun*	1,426	52.6	+20.1
Liberal Democrats	George James*	1,175	43.4	+11.9
Conservative	Graham Smith	1,064	39.3	+9.8
Conservative	Susan Cursham	643	23.7	+4.9
Conservative	Lorna Price	604	22.3	+5.9
Turnout		2,709	48.0	
Liberal Democrats hold				
Green hold				
Liberal Democrats hold				

== Changes 2021–2025 ==
Painswick and Upton by-election, 17 May 2023
Party	Candidate	Votes	%	±%
Green	Gary Luff	1,168	45.9	
Conservative	Susan Williams	817	32.1	
Liberal Democrats	Roz Savage	381	15.0	
Labour	Ela Pathak-Sen	180	7.1	
Turnout				
Green gain from Conservative				

The Painswick and Upton by-election was triggered by the resignation of Conservative councillor Jason Bullingham.
