= 2000 Stroud District Council election =

2000 UK local government election

The 2000 Stroud Council election took place on 4 May 2000 to elect members of Stroud District Council in Gloucestershire, England. One third of the council was up for election and the council stayed under no overall control.

After the election, the composition of the council was

- Conservative 23
- Labour 18
- Liberal Democrat 6
- Green 4
- Independent 4

== Background ==
Before the election the council was run by an alliance between the Labour Party and the Liberal Democrats.

== Election result ==
Stroud local election result 2000
Party	Seats	Gains	Losses	Net gain/loss	Seats %	Votes %	Votes	+/−
Conservative	14			+6	70.0	45.7	11,904	
Labour	3			-6	15.0	26.5	6,897	
Liberal Democrats	2			+1	10.0	20.2	5,250	
Green	1			0	5.0	4.9	1,268	
Independent	0			-1	0	1.9	499	
UKIP	0			0	0	0.5	136	
Natural Law	0			0	0	0.3	66	

== Ward results ==
Berkeley Vale
Party	Candidate	Votes	%	±%
Conservative	Anthony Moseley	436	56.2	
Labour	David Shaw	259	33.4	
Liberal Democrats	Thomas Murray	81	10.4	
Majority		177	22.8	
Turnout		776	37.9	

Cainscross
Party	Candidate	Votes	%	±%
Labour	Andrew Read	507	38.9	
Liberal Democrats	Deborah Sutherland	506	38.9	
Conservative	Ralph Kenber	289	22.2	
Majority		1	0.1	
Turnout		1,302	29.9	

Cam
Party	Candidate	Votes	%	±%
Liberal Democrats	Dennis Andrewartha	526	33.1	
Conservative	Philip Briscoe	467	29.4	
Labour	Miranda Clifton	452	28.5	
Independent	David Winsor	142	8.9	
Majority		59	3.7	
Turnout		1,587	40.7	

Chalford
Party	Candidate	Votes	%	±%
Conservative	Charles Fellows	854	53.8	
Labour	David Taylor	305	19.2	
Liberal Democrats	Leslie Christie	291	18.3	
UKIP	Adrian Blake	136	8.6	
Majority		549	34.6	
Turnout		1,586	35.2	

Dursley
Party	Candidate	Votes	%	±%
Conservative	Basil Allen	605	41.1	
Labour	Geoffrey Wheeler	537	36.5	
Liberal Democrats	David Thomas	330	22.4	
Majority		68	4.6	
Turnout		1,472	33.0	

Hardwicke
Party	Candidate	Votes	%	±%
Conservative	Graham Littleton	532	56.1	
Labour	David Purchase	341	36.0	
Liberal Democrats	John Howe	75	7.9	
Majority		191	20.1	
Turnout		948	33.3	

Kings Stanley
Party	Candidate	Votes	%	±%
Conservative	Nigel Studdert-Kennedy	471	35.1	
Labour	Lesley Illiams	411	30.6	
Liberal Democrats	Elizabeth Cheyne	255	19.0	
Green	Sheila MacFadyen	204	15.2	
Majority		60	4.5	
Turnout		1,341	44.9	

Minchinhampton (2)
Party	Candidate	Votes	%	±%
Conservative	Dorcas Binns	1,101		
Conservative	Stephen Glanfield	1,079		
Labour	Martin Alder	348		
Labour	David Griffiths	334		
Liberal Democrats	Margaret Edmunds	318		
Liberal Democrats	Andrew Fisk	235		
Natural Law	Henry Brighouse	28		
Turnout		3,443	41.1	

Nailsworth
Party	Candidate	Votes	%	±%
Labour	Norman Kay	710	44.7	
Conservative	Mohammad Akhtar	620	39.1	
Liberal Democrats	Bruce Douglas-Mann	257	16.2	
Majority		90	5.7	
Turnout		1,587	33.2	

Painswick
Party	Candidate	Votes	%	±%
Conservative	John Stephenson-Oliver	960	55.3	
Liberal Democrats	Terence Parker	625	36.0	
Labour	John Rhodes	113	6.5	
Natural Law	Sally Brighouse	38	2.2	
Majority		335	19.3	
Turnout		1,736	50.9	

Parklands
Party	Candidate	Votes	%	±%
Conservative	David Tomlins	453	70.5	
Labour	Francoise Jones	106	16.5	
Liberal Democrats	Milner Woodhead	84	13.1	
Majority		347	54.0	
Turnout		643	38.8	

Randwick
Party	Candidate	Votes	%	±%
Liberal Democrats	Michael Charley	278	54.2	
Labour	Anthony Shoritt	139	27.1	
Conservative	John Ferris	96	18.7	
Majority		139	27.1	
Turnout		513	44.2	

Rodborough
Party	Candidate	Votes	%	±%
Conservative	Roy Nicholas	605	45.8	
Labour	Ian Owen	327	24.8	
Green	Carol Kambites	264	20.0	
Liberal Democrats	Adrian Walker-Smith	125	9.5	
Majority		278	21.0	
Turnout		1,321	32.1	

Stonehouse
Party	Candidate	Votes	%	±%
Labour	Mattie Ross	807	53.6	
Conservative	Kamran Hameed	476	31.6	
Liberal Democrats	Melvyn Preston	224	14.9	
Majority		331	22.0	
Turnout		1,507	28.4	

Trinity
Party	Candidate	Votes	%	±%
Green	Gwendoline Belcher	578	41.3	
Conservative	Martin Hemming	545	38.9	
Labour	Henrietta Nichols	192	13.7	
Liberal Democrats	Margaret Fenn	86	6.1	
Majority		33	2.4	
Turnout		1,401	35.9	

Uplands
Party	Candidate	Votes	%	±%
Conservative	John Jeffreys	428	32.3	
Independent	Morgan Anthony	357	26.9	
Labour	Ronald Nichols	235	17.7	
Green	Kevin Cranston	222	16.7	
Liberal Democrats	Darren Jones	84	6.3	
Majority		71	5.4	
Turnout		1,326	29.8	

Upton St Leonards
Party	Candidate	Votes	%	±%
Conservative	Michael Beard	372	53.8	
Liberal Democrats	Keith Ardron	270	39.1	
Labour	Trevor Baker	49	7.1	
Majority		102	14.8	
Turnout		691	51.8	

Vale
Party	Candidate	Votes	%	±%
Conservative	Jonathan Steel	369	53.1	
Labour	Robert Hall	284	40.9	
Liberal Democrats	Barbara Brown	42	6.0	
Majority		85	12.2	
Turnout		695	48.3	

Wotton and Kingswood
Party	Candidate	Votes	%	±%
Conservative	Sidney Gowers	1,146	53.4	
Liberal Democrats	Barrie Pierce	558	26.0	
Labour	Geoffrey Keen	441	20.6	
Majority		588	27.4	
Turnout		2,145	37.0	
