= David Drew (politician) =

British politician (born 1952)

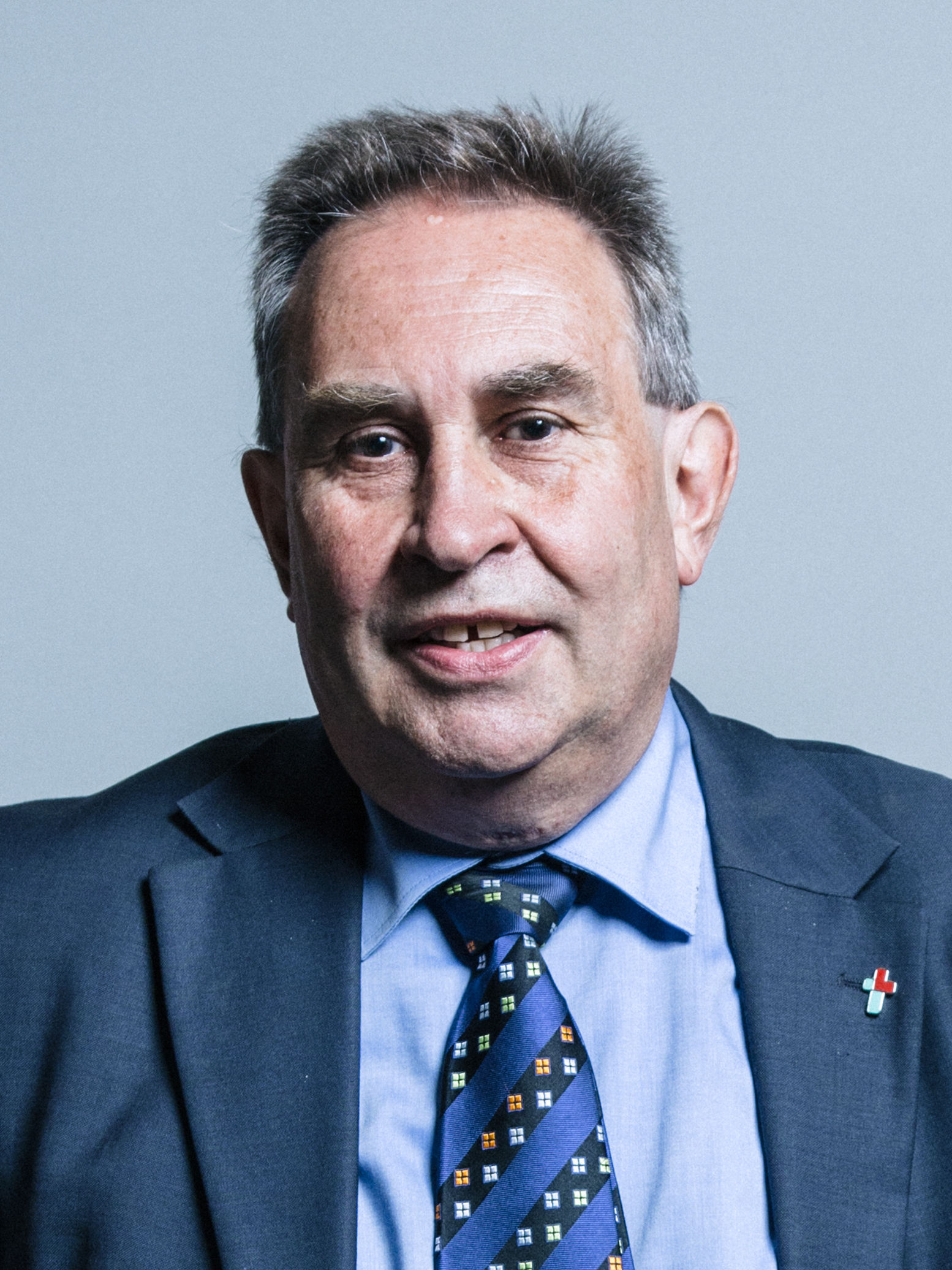
- Official portrait, 2017

Shadow Minister for Farming and Rural Affairs
- In office 3 July 2017 – 12 December 2019
- Leader: Jeremy Corbyn
- Preceded by: Mary Glindon
- Succeeded by: Daniel Zeichner

Member of Parliament for Stroud
- In office 8 June 2017 – 6 November 2019
- Preceded by: Neil Carmichael
- Succeeded by: Siobhan Baillie
- In office 1 May 1997 – 12 April 2010
- Preceded by: Roger Knapman
- Succeeded by: Neil Carmichael

Personal details
- Born: 13 April 1952 (age 74) Gloucestershire, England
- Party: Labour Co-op
- Other political affiliations: Socialist Campaign Group (1997–2010, 2017–19)
- Spouse: Anne Baker (m. 1990)
- Children: 4
- Education: University of Nottingham (BA); University of Birmingham (PGCE); University of the West of England (MA, MEd)
- Occupation: Politician; teacher

David Elliott Drew (born 13 April 1952) is a British politician who served as Member of Parliament (MP) for Stroud from 1997 to 2010 and 2017 to 2019. A member of the Labour and Co-operative parties, he was Shadow Minister for Farming and Rural Affairs from 2017 to 2019.

== Early life and career ==
Drew was born in Gloucestershire, the son of an accountant, and educated at Kingsfield School, Kingswood. He was awarded a Bachelor of Arts in economics at the University of Nottingham in 1974, and qualified as a teacher after receiving his Postgraduate Certificate in Education from the University of Birmingham in 1976. Drew gained a Master of Arts in historical studies from Bristol Polytechnic in 1988, and was awarded a Master of Education from the University of the West of England in 1994.

Drew began his teaching career at Princethorpe College, Rugby in 1976 and moved to St Michael's School, Stevenage in 1978. He returned to Gloucestershire in 1982, teaching at Maidenhill School, Stonehouse, before working at Dene Magna Community School, Mitcheldean. Drew was a member of the National Association of Schoolmasters/Union of Women Teachers throughout his teaching career, serving as a branch secretary from 1984 to 1986. He became a senior lecturer in education at the University of West England in 1986, where he worked until his election to Parliament. Drew remains a member of the University and College Union and has been a member of UNISON since 1990.

== Political career ==
Drew briefly served on Stevenage Borough Council for a year in 1981. He was a Member of Stroud District Council from 1987 to 1995 and Gloucestershire County Council from 1992 to 1997. He was also elected to Stonehouse Town Council in 1987 and served as Stroud Constituency Labour Party secretary in 1992.

Drew unsuccessfully contested Stroud at the 1992 general election, but defeated incumbent Conservative Roger Knapman at the 1997 general election. He increased his majority in 2001 and narrowly held the seat with a majority of 350 votes in 2005. Drew was defeated by Conservative Neil Carmichael at the 2010 general election.

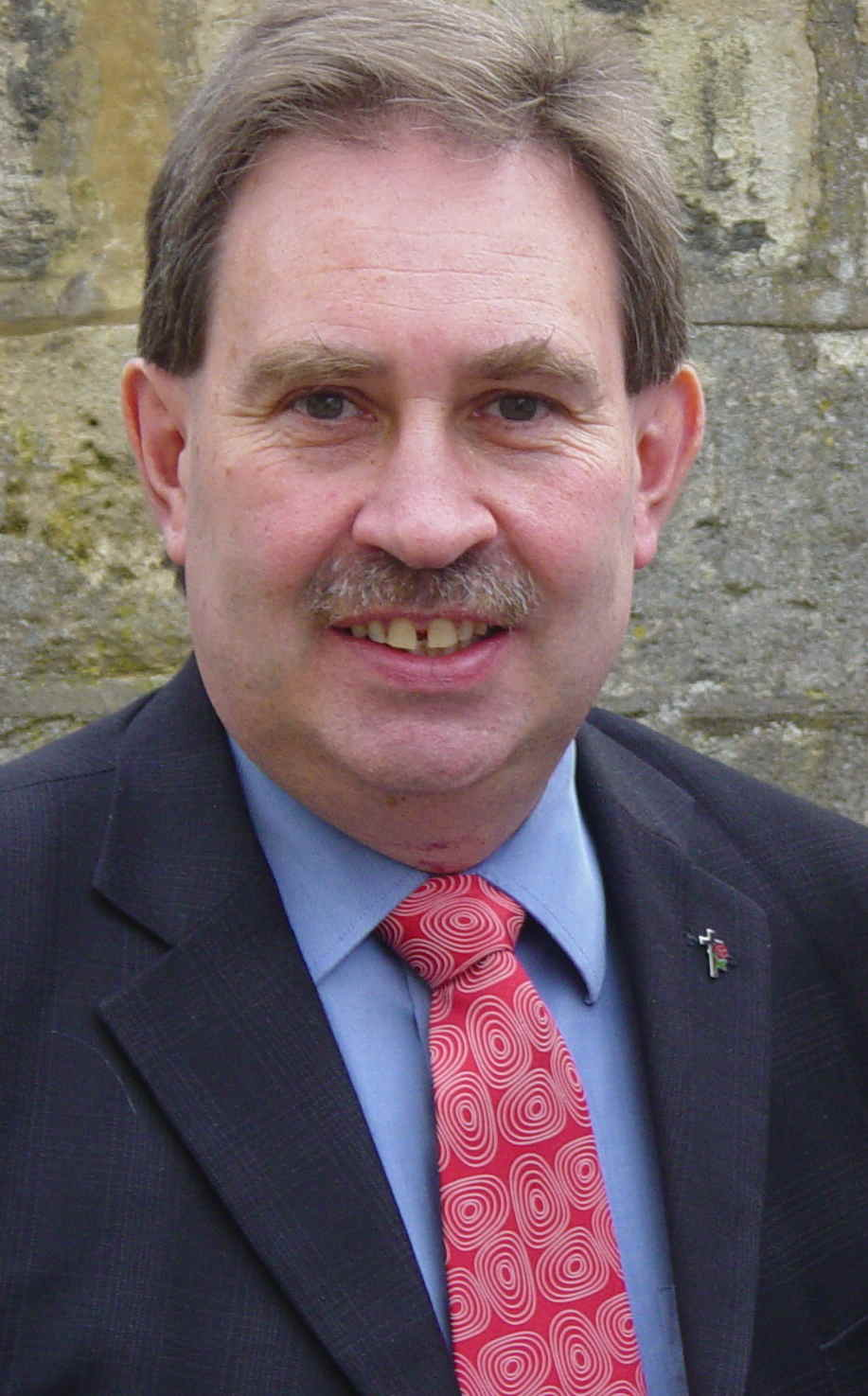
Drew in 2009

Drew made his maiden speech on 17 June 1997. He was a member of the Agriculture Select Committee, later the Environment, Food and Rural Affairs Committee, from 1999 to 2010.

Drew returned to Stroud District Council at the 2011 local elections, elected to represent Farmhill and Paganhill ward. He unsuccessfully contested Stroud once again in 2015, but won the seat from Carmichael at the 2017 general election with a majority of 687 votes. Shortly after re-election, he was appointed to his first front bench role in July 2017, as Shadow Minister for Farming and Rural Affairs.

He lost his seat to Conservative Siobhan Baillie at the 2019 general election, when he also faced a challenge from Green Party candidate Molly Scott Cato. Drew defeated Scott Cato to win a seat on Gloucestershire County Council in 2021, and narrowly missed out on election to Stroud District Council.

== Political views ==
A member of the Socialist Campaign Group, Drew was considered a backbench rebel having voted against the Iraq War and government anti-terror legislation. He nominated John McDonnell in the 2007 Labour leadership election.

Drew has been a staunch Eurosceptic, and welcomed an endorsement by Stroud's UKIP candidate at the 2010 general election. However, Drew gave a speech against Prime Minister Theresa May's deal to leave the EU in 2019, saying he feared Brexit would "become one of the biggest domestic policy disasters this country has known."

== Personal life ==
Drew married second wife Anne Baker in 1990, and has two daughters and two sons. He resides in Stonehouse, Gloucestershire and is a vegetarian.

He was appointed Chairman of Forest Green Rovers F.C. in May 2010, and later became Vice-Chairman. Drew resigned his role upon re-election to Parliament in 2017.

Parliament of the United Kingdom
Preceded by Roger Knapman	Member of Parliament for Stroud; 1997 – 2010	Succeeded by Neil Carmichael
Preceded by Neil Carmichael	Member of Parliament for Stroud; 2017 - 2019	Succeeded by Siobhan Baillie
