= Roundway =

Hamlet in Wiltshire, England

Coordinates: 51.368°N 01.981°W

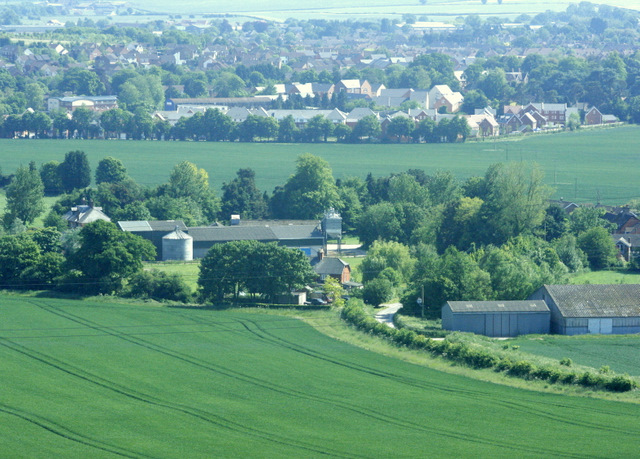
- View south from Roundway Hill

- Location within Wiltshire
- Population: 5,290 (in 2011)
- OS grid reference: SU014632
- Civil parish: Devizes
- Unitary authority: Wiltshire
- Ceremonial county: Wiltshire
- Region: South West
- Country: England
- Sovereign state: United Kingdom
- Post town: Devizes
- Postcode district: SN10
- Dialling code: 01380
- Police: Wiltshire
- Fire: Dorset and Wiltshire
- Ambulance: South Western
- UK Parliament: Melksham and Devizes
- Website: Devizes Town Council

Roundway is a hamlet, ward and former civil parish, now in the parish of Devizes, in the English county of Wiltshire. The hamlet lies about 1 1/4 miles (2.0 km) northeast of Devizes town centre.

In April 2017, Roundway civil parish was abolished and became a ward of Devizes parish, owing to housing development to the north, east and south of the town. At the 2001 census, Roundway parish had a population of 2,267, increasing to 5,290 at the census of 2011.

Roundway ward is in the north, east and southwest of Devizes, and on the north side lies off the A361, which passes from Devizes to Swindon. On the southwest side it is accessible by the A360 Salisbury – Devizes road, and by the A342. The small hamlet of Roundway lies just to the north of this, towards the White Horse. The north part of Roundway provides a bypass from the north of Devizes to the west through Conscience Lane.

Towards the south of the ward is the former hamlet of Nursteed, now a contiguous suburb of Devizes.

Most of the land surrounding Roundway is agricultural. To the north of the hamlet is Roundway Hill, a popular place for walking and kite and model aircraft flying. The hill has round barrows which are scheduled monuments.

== Governance ==
The ward elects six councillors to Devizes parish council. It is in the area of Wiltshire Council unitary authority, which is responsible for all significant local government functions.

The civil parish was created on 31 December 1894 from part of Bishops Cannings parish in the Potterne and Cannings hundred and part of Devizes St James. Part of its area was transferred to Devizes in 1934.

Following a community governance review in 2016, effective 1 April 2017, Roundway parish was abolished and most of its area became a ward of Devizes parish. At the same time there were minor boundary changes, so that the Northfields area is wholly within Bishop Cannings parish, while the Hopton industrial estate is wholly within Roundway ward.

== Amenities ==
The ward has two primary schools: The Trinity Church of England Voluntary Aided Primary School (to the north) and Nursteed Community Primary School (towards the south).

The Kennet and Avon canal crosses the ward.

Roundway Down and Covert is a Site of Special Scientific Interest.

The former parish has no church and is served by churches in Devizes and Bishops Cannings.

== Devizes White Horse ==
A chalk hill figure of a horse was created in the hill above Roundway hamlet in September 1999 to celebrate the millennium. It replaces the white horse of Devizes (Snob's Horse) that was lost after 1845.

== Oliver's Castle ==
Oliver Cromwell is mistakenly thought to have fought at the Battle of Roundway Down in 1643, hence the alternative name for the Roundway Downs, 'Olivers Castle'.

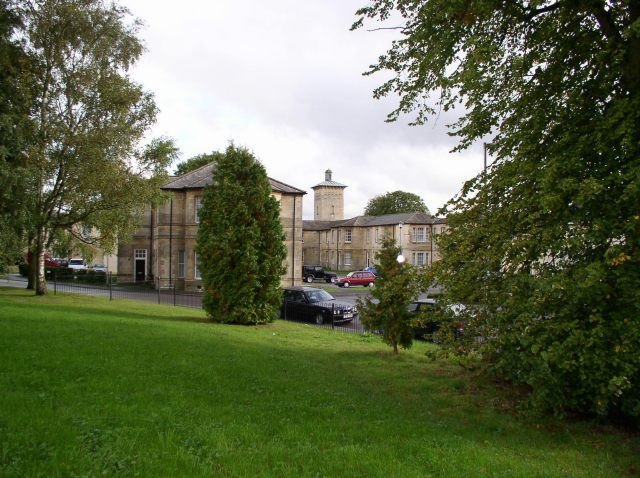
Former Roundway Hospital, now residences

== Roundway Hospital ==
A large Victorian psychiatric hospital stood in the south of the parish and served Wiltshire until it was closed in 1995, following a decision to close it in 1989. The mental health services were transferred to the newly built Green Lane Hospital on part of the same site.

== Notable buildings ==
Roundway House, in the north of the ward, is a Grade II listed building that is the remains of the 18th century country house in the former Roundway Park. The property was last owned privately by the Colston family who sold it in 1948. It was demolished in 1955, leaving the stable block which is now a residence.

Roundway Farmhouse is from the early 18th century, altered in 1900; Roundway Hill Farmhouse is from around the end of the 18th century.

== Notable people ==
Members of the Colston family at Roundway Park include Charles (1854–1925), High Sheriff of Wiltshire and member of parliament, who became Baron Roundway in 1916; and his son Edward (1880–1944), army officer in the Boer War and World War I.

Henry Billington (1908–1980), tennis player, was born in Roundway and is the maternal grandfather of tennis player Tim Henman.
