= Baron Roundway =

Extinct barony in the Peerage of the United Kingdom

Baron Roundway, of Devizes in the County of Wilts, was a title in the Peerage of the United Kingdom. It was created on 30 June 1916 for Charles Colston, Conservative Member of Parliament for Thornbury from 1892 to 1906. He was succeeded by his only son, the second Baron. He was a Brigadier-General in the Army and fought in the Second Boer War and in the First World War. He had no male issue and on his death on 29 March 1944 the barony became extinct.

The family seat was Roundway Park, near Devizes, Wiltshire.

== Barons Roundway (1916) ==
- Charles Edward Hungerford Atholl Colston, 1st Baron Roundway (1854–1925)
- Edward Murray Colston, 2nd Baron Roundway (1880–1944)
