= James Sutton (MP) =

English politician

James Sutton (c. 1733–1801), of New Park, Devizes, Wiltshire, was an English politician.

== Life ==
He born the younger son of Prince Sutton, a Devizes clothier, and his wife Mary Willy, sister of William Willy. He inherited the New Park estate at Roundway, near Devizes, on the death of his elder brother in 1775. Around 1780 he had a new house built there, to a design by James Wyatt. It was demolished in 1955.

He was a Member (MP) of the Parliament of Great Britain for Devizes on 3 June 1765 – 1780. He was appointed High Sheriff of Wiltshire for 1785–86.

== Family ==
Sutton married Eleanor, daughter of Anthony Addington, M.D., of Reading and the sister of Henry Addington. They had sons James and George William who died as infants; and a daughter Mary who died in 1791 at age 14. Their daughter Eleanor married Thomas Grimston Estcourt; and the third daughter Mary married Crispianus Load. Another daughter Sarah died in 1841, at age 76; she had married Robert J. Matthews.
