= Ivan de la Bere =

Sir Ivan de la Bere
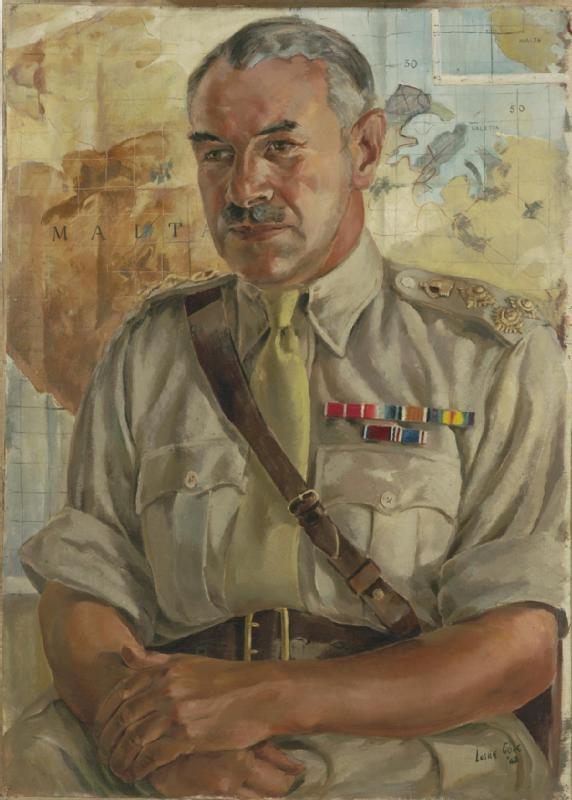
- de la Bere, by Leslie Cole, 1943
- Born: 25 April 1893; Cheltenham, England
- Died: 27 December 1970 (aged 77)
- Military career
- Allegiance: United Kingdom
- Branch: British Army
- Service years: 1913–1945
- Rank: Brigadier
- Commands: 233rd Infantry Brigade (1943–1945); 3rd (Malta) Infantry Brigade (1942–1943); Central Infantry Brigade (1941–1942); 1st Battalion Dorsetshire Regiment (1939–1940)
- Conflicts: First World War; Second World War
- Awards: Knight Commander of the Royal Victorian Order; Companion of the Order of the Bath; Commander of the Order of the British Empire
- Other work: Secretary-General, Central Chancery of the Orders of Knighthood; Extra Gentleman Usher to the Queen

Signature
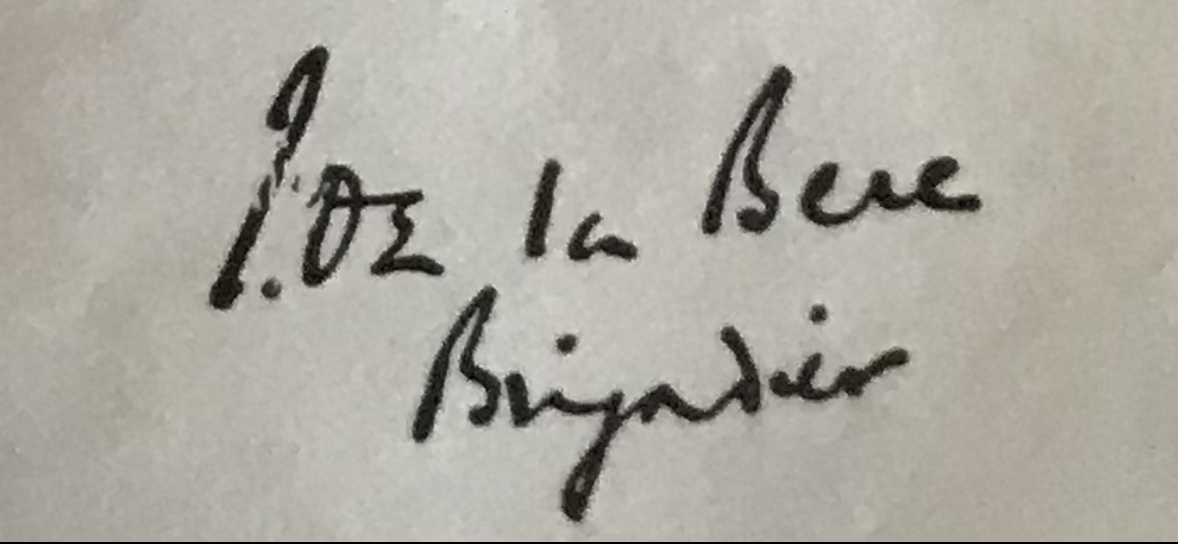

Brigadier Sir Ivan de la Bere, KCVO, CB, CBE (25 April 1893 – 27 December 1970) was a senior British Army officer, who played a prominent part in the Siege of Malta during the Second World War. He was later an official in the Royal Household.

== Early life ==
Ivan de la Bere was born on 25 April 1893, the son of John de la Bere of Battledown Manor, Cheltenham, Gloucestershire. He was educated at Wellington College, Berkshire, and Sidney Sussex College, Cambridge, where he was awarded a Bachelor of Arts degree.

== Military career ==
In 1913, de la Bere joined the British Army and was commissioned as a second lieutenant into the Dorsetshire Regiment. During the First World War he served two spells of duty in France and Belgium in 1914–15 and 1915–16, including a period attached to the Connaught Rangers, and was wounded. In 1916 he was seconded in the rank of captain to the Royal Flying Corps. In January 1918 de la Bere received a special staff appointment as a Conducting Officer in France, escorting visitors to the armies, and became an Assistant Press Officer in May 1918, retaining that appointment in the British Army of the Rhine after the Armistice with Germany.

De la Bere then spent a number of years in staff positions in the War Office, receiving promotion to major in 1931. In 1935 he returned to regimental duty in command of the Dorsets' regimental depot. Then in 1939 he was promoted to lieutenant colonel and took command of the 1st Battalion Dorsets. On the outbreak of the Second World War they were stationed in Malta.

The Siege of Malta began on 11 June 1940, following Italy's entry into the war. The island was dependent on supply convoys fighting their way through from Gibraltar or Alexandria, and meanwhile, the garrison and people were subjected to some of the heaviest bombing of the war for a period of over two years. For its part, the island provided a base for air and sea attacks on supply convoys to the Italian and German forces fighting in North Africa. On 27 July 1941 de la Bere, by now a colonel (promoted 27 July 1940), was placed in command of a new Central Infantry Brigade, formed by a brigade headquarters that had come out from the United Kingdom and by infantry battalions that had been brought in as reinforcements from Egypt. De la Bere was injured in November 1941, but returned to duty within three weeks, and commanded the brigade until the end of the war, ending as an acting major general. Central Brigade was redesignated 3rd (Malta) Infantry Brigade in 1942 and later became 233rd Infantry Brigade. During the siege de la Bere organised gifts and activities to maintain the morale of the civil population.

== Later career ==
De la Bere retired from the army with the rank of brigadier after the Second World War and in 1947 was appointed Secretary-General of the Central Chancery of the Orders of Knighthood, an office within the Royal Household at St James's Palace responsible for administering a large part of the British Honours system. He was the author of The Queen's Orders of Chivalry (1961). He retired in 1960 and the following year was appointed an Extra Gentleman Usher to the Queen, a post that he held until his death.

== Family ==
On 7 October 1922, at All Soul's Church, St Marylebone, London, de la Bere married Marjorie Minton Haines, daughter of Noel Alexander Minton Haines. They had one child, a daughter, Elizabeth Ann de la Bere who predeceased him aged 18 years. Ann was aboard the MV Abosso (1 of 10 civilian casualties) when she was sunk by German submarine U-575 on 29 October 1942, in the Atlantic Ocean between the Azores and British Isles. De la Bere died on 27 December 1970.

== Awards ==
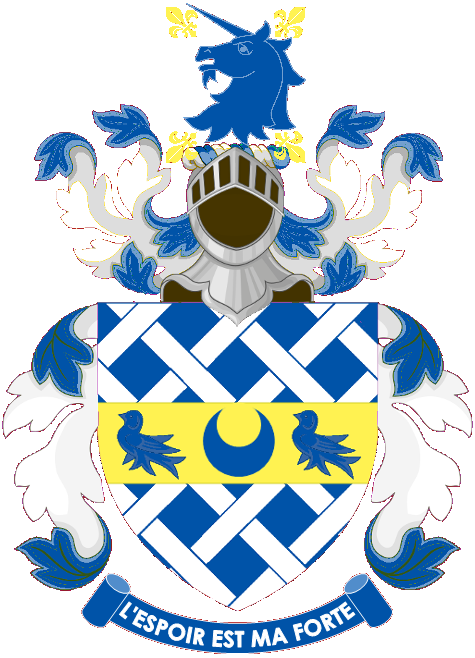
Sir Ivan's coat of arms is displayed on a stall plate at Westminster Abbey.

During his life de la Bere received the following British and Foreign honours and awards:

- Officer of the Order of the British Empire (OBE) 1934, advanced to Commander of the Order of the British Empire (CBE) in 1944.
- Commander of the Royal Victorian Order (CVO) 1950, advanced to Knight Commander of the Royal Victorian Order (KCVO) in 1959.
- Companion of the Order of the Bath (CB) 1957.
- Commander of the Order of St John
- Commander of the Order of Merit of the Federal Republic of Germany
- Commander of the Order of Merit of the Italian Republic
- Commander of the Order of the White Elephant (Thailand)
- Officer of the Legion of Honour (France)
- Officer of the Order of Orange-Nassau (Netherlands)
- Officer of the Order of Radifan (Iraq)
- Officer of the Order of the Dannebrog (Denmark)
- Officer of the Order of the Polar Star (Sweden)
- Personal Order of the Shah of Persia
