= Derrick Gunston =

British politician & army officer (1891-1985)

Sir Derrick Wellesley Gunston, 1st Baronet MC, (26 February 1891 – 13 July 1985) was a Unionist politician in the United Kingdom.

He was educated at Harrow and Trinity College, Cambridge.

Gunston served with the Irish Guards in World War I and was awarded the Military Cross in 1918.

He was elected at the 1924 general election as Member of Parliament (MP) for the Thornbury constituency, in Gloucestershire, and held the seat until his defeat at the 1945 general election by the Labour Party candidate, Joseph Alpass. He was Parliamentary Private Secretary to a succession of leading Conservatives, including Edward Grigg and Neville Chamberlain.

In February 1938, he was made a baronet, of Wickwar in the County of Gloucester. In 1942 he returned to the Army as a major in the 7th Battalion Gloucesterhire Regiment. His eldest son was killed in action in 1944.

In 1943, he was on a British Parliamentary Commission to investigate the future of Newfoundland and Labrador; the other members were Charles Ammon (Chairman) and A. P. Herbert.

His main home was in Onslow Square, London, but he had a cottage in Bembridge as his second home. He was a keen sailor and was a member of both the Royal Yacht Squadron and the Bembridge Sailing Club. He continued sailing till he was 88. In the 1930s he was racing with Lord Brabazon of Tara. In a tight finish with a falling tide in the harbour they took a chance and got stuck in the mud. Brabazon ordered his crewman, Gunston, over the side but he failed to push the boat off. So Brabazon joined on the mud to help push. A moment later the boat was crewless and setting sail in the tide on her own for the open sea - much to the great delight of the members of the sailing club.

On his death at Edgecombe House, Newbury he left his wife of 68 years, Gardenia. His son Richard Wellesley Gunston succeeded to his title.

Parliament of the United Kingdom
Preceded by Athelstan Rendall	Member of Parliament for Thornbury; 1924–1945	Succeeded by Joseph Alpass
Baronetage of the United Kingdom
New creation	Baronet of Wickwar, Gloucestershire; 1938–1985	Succeeded by Richard Gunston
