= Roundway Down and Covert =

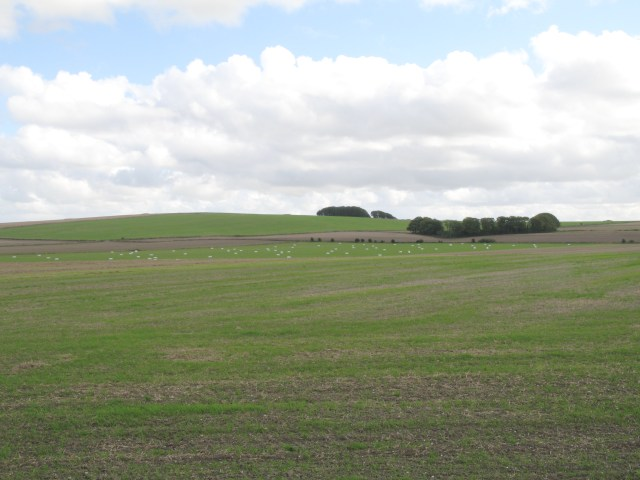
- Roundway Down
- 51.38045°N 2.00139°W
- Type: Hillfort and battle ground
- Location: Wiltshire, England

History
- Built: c. 800 BC - 450 BC

Site notes
- Area: 86 hectares (210 acres)

Scheduled monument
- Official name: Oliver's Camp and two round barrows outside Oliver's Camp
- Designated: 10 November 1964
- Reference no.: 1005709

Registered battlefield
- Official name: Battle of Roundway Down 1643
- Designated: 5 Jun 1995
- Reference no.: 1000030
- Roundway Down and Covert
- Site of Special Scientific Interest
- Area of search: Wiltshire
- Grid reference: ST9990364655
- Coordinates: 51.38045°N 2.00139°W
- Interest: Biological
- Area: 86-hectare (212.5-acre)
- Notification date: 1971

Roundway Down and Covert (grid reference SU000646) is an area of sloping chalk grassland close to the hamlet of Roundway, near Devizes in Wiltshire, England. It is part of the North Wessex Downs Area of Outstanding Natural Beauty. At the summit of the slope are ancient earthworks, evidence of a Bronze Age human settlement and Iron Age hillfort.

During the Civil War, the Battle of Roundway Down was fought here in 1643, and today the hillfort is known locally as "Oliver's Castle" or "Oliver's Camp". In 1971 the 86-hectare (210-acre) site was notified as a biological Site of Special Scientific Interest.

== Hillfort ==
Archaeological remains of a univallate hillfort exist at the top of Roundway Hill, a chalk escarpment. The fortifications are thought to date from between the Late Bronze Age and Early Iron Age (between the eighth and fifth century BC). The site consists of a triangular central area of approximately 1.6 hectares (4.0 acres) enclosed by a single rampart, ditch and counterscarp bank. The north and south sides have steep natural slopes, and so the remains of the main defences are found on the eastern side. Also situated on the summit are two bowl barrows (types of tumuli).

In 1907, the archaeologists Maud Cunnington and Ben Cunnington excavated the site. They found evidence of an older Bronze Age settlement below the hillfort, and artefacts such as Romano-British pottery, antler and animal bone suggested that the site had been a centre of human activity for a prolonged period. Excavations in the bowl barrows revealed evidence of a cremation, along with an incense cup, perforated conical buttons and secondary urn burials, flints, and Bronze Age and Romano-British pottery. Further excavations in 1977 revealed more artefacts, along with evidence that the barrows were at one time incorporated into the hillfort's outer ramparts.

The hillfort was designated a scheduled monument in 1964.

== Civil War ==
During the First English Civil War, Roundway Down became the site of a noted battle. On 13 July 1643, a Royalist cavalry force under Lord Wilmot fought the Parliamentarian Army of the West under Sir William Waller in the Battle of Roundway Down.

The Parliamentarian forces were defeated and at the end of the battle, a large number of their fleeing cavalry rode over the 300 feet (91 m) cliff to their deaths. The ditch at the bottom was given the name "Bloody Ditch" as a result of this rout, while the hillfort is now known as "Oliver's Camp" or "Oliver's Castle" (after Oliver Cromwell).

== Site of Special Scientific Interest ==
The site was notified as a biological Site of Special Scientific Interest in 1971. The escarpment is noted as a habitat for rare wildflower species such as bastard toadflax, early gentian, field fleawort and round-headed rampion, as well as a range of insects, including over 30 types of butterfly.

== Watershed ==
Roundway Down contains the hydrological triple divide of Great Britain, where rainfall drains into the English Channel (via the Salisbury Avon), the Atlantic Ocean (via the Bristol Avon and Severn Estuary) and the North Sea (via the Kennet and Thames). The precise point of this principal watershed of southern England is within Leipzig Plantation.

== Devizes White Horse ==
To the south-east of Roundway Down on Bank Field is the Devizes Millennium White Horse, a chalk hill figure of a horse which was carved into the hillside in 1999.

== Landscape features ==
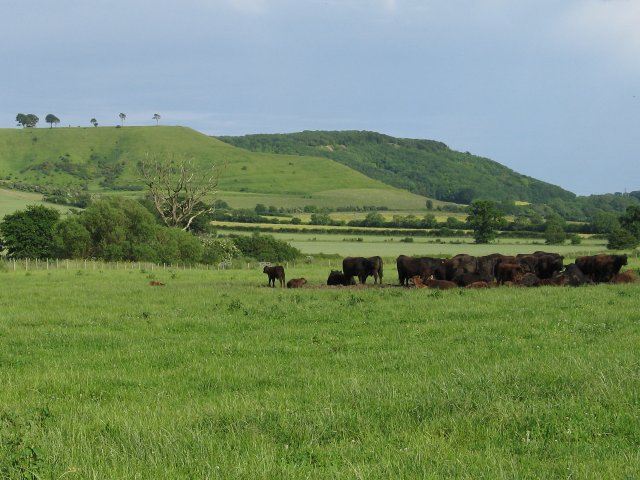
View of the hill fort

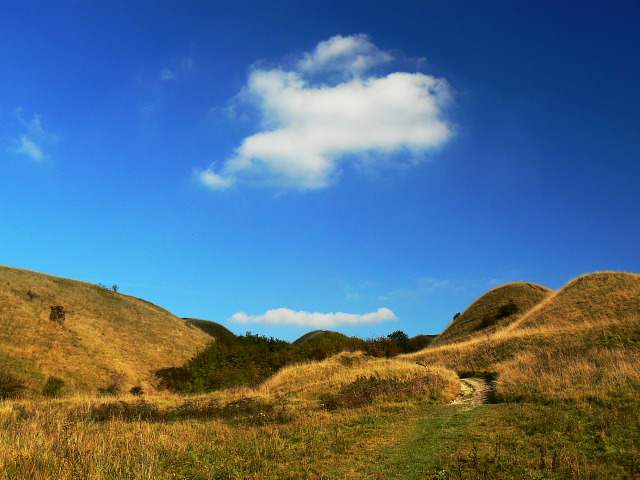
Beacon Hill, to the north

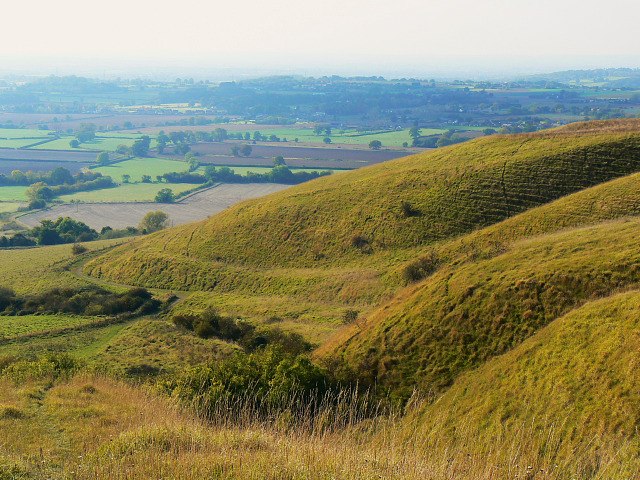
The chalk escarpment

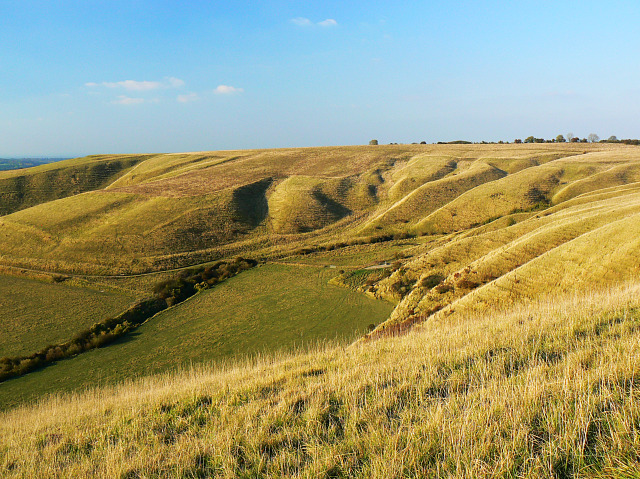
"Bloody Ditch"

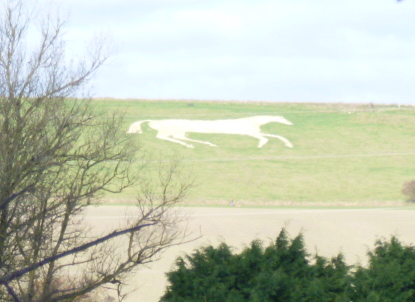
The Devizes White Horse

== Sources ==
- Natural England citation sheet for the site (accessed 25 May 2023)
