= Joseph Alpass =

British politician (1873–1969)

Joseph Herbert Alpass CBE (2 February 1873 – 31 May 1969) was a British Labour Party politician.

He was the chairman of one of meetings held during the Clarion Van visit to Stroud in July 1897 (where he is referred to as "Councillor Alpass") He is also recorded as speaking at a street corner meeting held by the Cheltenham Branch of the Independent Labour Party in July 1899 on the subject "Objections to Socialism Answered".

Alpass was a County Councillor for Gloucestershire and later and Alderman (full dates are not known but he was a Councillor in the period before the Great War and was a member after the Great War) and is noted as an Alderman in 1934. The first record of his return at an ordinary election was when he was unopposed in 1907 for Berkeley where he succeeded the previous councillor William Legge, who had died. He was also returned unopposed in 1913 as the sitting councillor presumably elected in 1910

He was also contested the Thornbury Rural District Council election in 1904 for the Hinton Ward but did not get elected but was a member of Berkeley Parish Council. He had also been a supporter of Mr A T Price when he was nominated to stand for the County Council in 1904 but had lost to Mr Legge.

At the 1922 general election, Alpass was an unsuccessful candidate in the Thornbury constituency in Gloucestershire. He was beaten again at the 1924 general election in Cirencester and Tewkesbury, where the Conservative candidate won 72% of the votes.

At the next general election, in 1929, he was elected as Member of Parliament (MP) for Bristol Central. He was defeated at the 1931 general election, and did not stand for Parliament again until the 1945 general election, when he was elected as MP for Thornbury. He served only one term, until the constituency was abolished in boundary changes for the 1950 general election.

== Family history ==
He was born on 2 February 1873 at Clifton, Bristol, but from the time of the 1881 census until at least 1920 he lived in Berkeley where his mother and father ran a grocer's shop in which he worked along with his brother and sister.

After the First World War he is recorded as an auctioneer living in Berkeley but also appears to have done business in the Thornbury area.

He married Louisa Anne Taylor Neale, daughter of a Berkeley farmer, on 13 September 1905.

He appears in a newspaper report of an Electoral Registration Court where the revising barrister removed his name from the list stating "It is one of the worst faggots that has come under my experience." This refers to registering for a vote using a loophole in the legislation. His evidence was a lease of the land to his father.

== Sources ==
- Craig, F. W. S. (1983) [1969]. British parliamentary election results 1918–1949 (3rd ed.). Chichester: Parliamentary Research Services. ISBN 0-900178-06-X.
- Leigh Rayment's Historical List of MPs

Parliament of the United Kingdom
Preceded by Thomas Inskip	Member of Parliament for Bristol Central; 1929–1931	Succeeded by Lord Apsley
Preceded by Sir Sir Derrick Gunston, Bt.	Member of Parliament for Thornbury; 1945–1950	Constituency abolished
