= Edward Murray Colston, 2nd Baron Roundway =

Brigadier-General The Right Honourable The Lord Roundway CMG DSO MVO
- Born: 31 December 1880; Roundway Park, Devizes, Wiltshire, England
- Died: 29 March 1944 (aged 63); Roundway Park, Devizes, Wiltshire, England
- Military career
- Branch: British Army
- Service years: 1900–1932
- Rank: Brigadier-General
- Commands: Imperial School of Instruction, Egypt; 233rd Brigade; 2nd Bn Grenadier Guards; 131st (Surrey) Brigade; Wiltshire Home Guard
- Conflicts: 2nd Boer War; World War I
- Other work: Exon, Yeomen of the Guard

Brigadier-General Edward Murray Colston, 2nd Baron Roundway, CMG, DSO, MVO (31 December 1880 – 29 March 1944) was a British Army officer in the Second Boer War and World War I.

== Early life ==
Edward Colston was born on 31 December 1880 at Roundway Park, near Devizes in Wiltshire, the only son and heir of Charles Colston, later Member of Parliament for Thornbury, who was created Baron Roundway of Devizes in 1916. He was educated at Eton College, 1894–99.

== Military career ==
=== Boer War ===
Colston was an officer in the 4th (Militia) battalion of the Prince of Wales's (North Staffordshire Regiment). He was commissioned a second lieutenant in the Grenadier Guards on 21 February 1900, and served with the 2nd Battalion in South Africa 1901–02 during the Second Boer War, where he was wounded. Following the end of the war, he returned home with other men of his battalion on the SS Galeka in October 1902. He was promoted to captain in 1908.

=== World War I ===
During World War I Colston was in the Retreat from Mons, the Battle of the Marne and the fighting on the Aisne before he was wounded and invalided back to the UK. He was later awarded the Distinguished Service Order for his service in this period.

Colston was promoted to major in 1915, appointed a General staff Officer (Grade 2), and sent to Egypt to establish a school of technical instruction (the Imperial School of Instruction) for troops stationed there, serving as its Commandant 1915–17. (He was referred to as 'The Hon. Edward Colston' after his father's elevation to the peerage in 1916.) Colston was promoted on 25 May 1917 to Brevet Lieutenant-Colonel in 1917 and appointed to command 233rd Brigade in the rank of Temporary Brigadier-General.

233 Brigade was part of 75th Division, a new formation being created by the Egyptian Expeditionary Force from British battalions of the Territorial Force arriving as reinforcements from India, together Indian Army battalions.

The new brigade took over the Rafa defences in Sinai in June 1917, and only joined 75th Division in August that year. It took part in the EEF's invasion of Palestine beginning with the Third Battle of Gaza on 27 October 1917, culminating in the Capture of Gaza (6–7 November) and Junction Station (13–14 November), and the Battle of Nebi Samwil (20–24 November). When the divisional commander fell sick that December, Colston acted for him.

In the Spring of 1918, 233 Bde was involved in the actions at Tell 'Asur (11–12 March) and Berukin (9–11 April). During General Allenby's final offensive (the Battles of Megiddo), 233 Bde took part in the Battle of Sharon (19 September).

At the end of the fighting on 19 September 75 Division went into reserve until the Armistice with the Turks was signed on 31 October. Demobilisation began early in 1919, but the 75th Division was selected for the Army of Occupation of Palestine. The reduced division formed one composite brigade under Colston's command. In March 1919 it returned to garrison duty in Egypt. Colston relinquished command of 233 Brigade on 16 October 1919.

=== Between the wars ===
Colston became a substantive Lieutenant-Colonel in 1920 and commanded 2nd Battalion, Grenadier Guards, 1920–24. He was promoted to colonel in 1924 and commanded 131st (Surrey) Brigade of the Territorial Army 1927–31. Colston became Lord Roundway in 1925 on the death of his father. He retired from the army with the honorary rank of brigadier general on 16 January 1932, and was appointed Exon of the Yeomen of the Guard, receiving his stick of office from King George V.

=== Home Guard ===
During World War II Lord Roundway served as Zone Commander of the Wiltshire Home Guard.

== Awards ==
Colston had been appointed a Member of the Royal Victorian Order in 1908 and received his DSO in 1916. For his services in World War I he was made a Companion of the Order of St Michael and St George in 1918 and awarded the Order of the Nile (3rd Class) and the Order of the White Eagle (Serbia) (4th Class).

== Family ==
On 28 April 1904 Colston married Blanche Gladys Duddell, only daughter of George Duddell of Queen's Park, Brighton. Their only daughter was killed in a fall from the window of their London home in 1924, aged 14. After an illness of several months, Lord Roundway died on 29 March 1944 when in the absence of male heirs the Barony became extinct. Lady Roundway continued to live at Roundway Park until 1949 when the estate was sold.

== Notes ==
Peerage of the United Kingdom
Preceded by Charles Colston	Baron Roundway; 1925–1944	Extinct
