= 233rd Brigade (United Kingdom) =

233rd Infantry Brigade
- Active: 25 May 1917 – 16 March 1920; 27 July 1941–1945
- Country: United Kingdom
- Branch: British Army
- Type: Infantry Brigade
- Part of: 75th Division (First World War); Malta Command (Second World War)

Commanders
- Notable commanders: Edward Colston; Ivan de la Bere

233rd Brigade was an infantry formation of the British Army in the First and the Second World Wars

== First World War ==
233rd Brigade was formed at Zeitun, near Cairo, on 25 May 1917, as part of 75th Division, which was being organised by the British Egyptian Expeditionary Force (EEF) from Territorial Force battalions arriving as reinforcements from India. The War Office ordered that Indian Army battalions should also be included in order to speed up the formation of the Division, and 233rd Brigade was formed on this basis.

=== Order of Battle ===
The following units served in 233rd Brigade:

- 1/5th Battalion, Somerset Light Infantry (had gone to India with 43rd (Wessex) Infantry Division in October 1914; joined 25 May 1917)
- 2/4th Battalion, Hampshire Regiment (had gone to India with 45th (2nd Wessex) Infantry Division in December 1914; joined 25 May 1917; left for Western Front 2 May 1918 and joined 62nd (2nd West Riding) Division)
- 2nd Battalion, 3rd Gurkha Rifles (joined 24 June 1917 from 29th Indian Brigade)
- 3rd Battalion, 3rd Gurkha Rifles (joined 30 June 1917 from 29th Indian Brigade)
- 230th Machine Gun Company (joined 15 July 1917; transferred to 75th Battalion Machine Gun Corps 3 May 1918)
- 233rd Trench Mortar Battery (joined 1 September 1917; disbanded 27 November 1918)
- 1/4th Battalion, Wiltshire Regiment (had gone to India with 43rd (Wessex) Infantry Division in October 1914; joined 15 October 1917; transferred to 232nd Brigade 3 May 1918)
- 2/4th Battalion, Dorsetshire Regiment (had gone to India with 45th (2nd Wessex) Division in December 1914; transferred from 234th Brigade 25 April 1918; disbanded by 10 August 1918)
- 29th Punjabis (joined from India 28 April 1918)
- 2nd Battalion, 154th Infantry (a new battalion formed at Basra with one company each from:
  - 102nd King Edward's Own Grenadiers
  - 108th Infantry
  - 119th Infantry (The Mooltan Regiment)
  - 122nd Rajputana Infantry

and joined from Mesopotamia 25 July 1918)

=== Commanders ===
The following officers commanded 233rd Brigade during this period:

- Brig-Gen The Hon Edward Colston
- Brig-Gen E.H. Wildblood (from 16 October 1919)

=== Service ===
233rd Brigade took over the Rafa defences in Sinai in June 1917, and only joined 75th Division on 18 August that year. It took part in the EEF's invasion of Palestine beginning with the Third Battle of Gaza on 27 October 1917, culminating in the Capture of Gaza (6–7 November) and Junction Station (13–14 November), and the Battle of Nebi Samwil (20–24 November). In the Spring of 1918, 233rd Brigade was involved in the actions at Tell 'Asur (11–12 March) and Berukin (9–11 April). During General Allenby's final offensive (the Battles of Megiddo, 233rd Brigade took part in the Battle of Sharon (19 September). At the end of the fighting on 19 September, 75 Division went into reserve until the Armistice with the Turks was signed on 31 October. Demobilisation began early in 1919, but the 75th Division was selected for the Army of Occupation of Palestine. The reduced division formed one composite brigade under the command of Brig-Gen Colston of 233rd Brigade. In March 1919 it returned to garrison duty in Egypt, and other units were attached for this work. Finally, 233rd Brigade was disbanded on 16 March 1920.

== Second World War ==
On 27 July 1941, Malta Command created Central Infantry Brigade from among reinforcements that had reached the island from Egypt during the ongoing siege; brigade HQ was provided by HQ 'D' Infantry Brigade, which had come out from the United Kingdom. Central Infantry Brigade was commanded by Brigadier Ivan de la Bere, and was renamed 3rd (Malta) Infantry Brigade on 14 July 1942. It was renamed again as 233rd Infantry Brigade on 1 April 1943.

=== Order of Battle ===
The following units served in 3rd (Malta)/233 Brigade:

- 11th Battalion, Lancashire Fusiliers (until 20 May 1944)
- 1st Battalion, Cheshire Regiment (machine gun battalion) (until 22 January 1943)
- 2nd Battalion, Queen's Own Royal West Kent Regiment (until 10 April 1943)
- 4th Battalion, Buffs (Royal East Kent Regiment) (11 April – 5 September 1943)
- 1st Battalion, King's Own Malta Regiment (from 11 June 1943)
- 10th (Territorial) Battalion, King's Own Malta Regiment (4 May 1942 – 5 October 1943)
- 8th Battalion, King's Own Royal Regiment (Lancaster) (11 October – 3 November 1943)
- 2nd Battalion, King's Own Malta Regiment (from 10 October 1943)
- 3rd Battalion, King's Own Malta Regiment (from 10 October 1943)
- 30th Battalion, Royal Northumberland Fusiliers (from 14 May 1944)
