= Herbert Charles Woodcock =

British businessman and Conservative Party politician

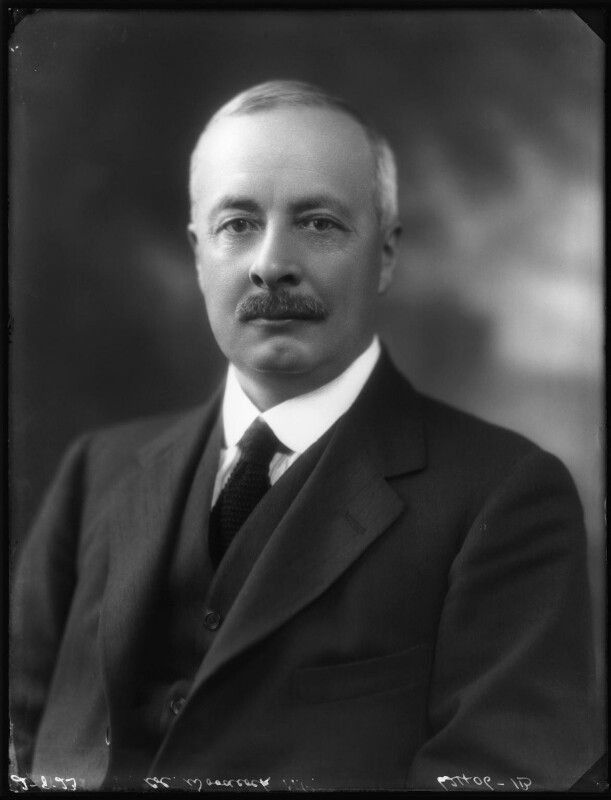
Woodcock

Herbert Charles Woodcock (2 June 1871 – 18 January 1950) was a British businessman and Conservative Party politician.

The son of Charles Woodcock of Smethwick and his wife, Annie (née Robertson) of Bristol, he entered business and local politics in the latter city. He was an alderman on Bristol City Council for many years and a member of the Bristol Stock Exchange from 1898.

He was a director of a number of public companies including the Metropolitan Cinema Investment Corporation Limited and the British Benzol and Coal Distillation Limited.

Woodcock held a commission in the Volunteer Force and its successor the Territorial Force, and in 1911 became commanding officer of the 6th Battalion, the Gloucestershire Regiment. With the outbreak of war in 1914 he mobilised with the battalion, serving on the Western Front and in Italy.

Woodcock was elected at the 1922 general election as the member of parliament (MP) for Thornbury division of Gloucestershire, defeating the sitting Liberal MP Athelstan Rendall by a majority only 104 votes (0.3% of the total). However, he lost the seat to Rendall at the next election, in 1923.

Woodcock returned to Parliament a year later, when he was elected at the 1924 general election as MP for the Everton division of Liverpool. He held that seat until the 1929 general election, which he did not contest.

He was appointed in November 1922 as a deputy lieutenant of Gloucestershire. He was master of the court of the Worshipful Company of Wheelwrights, a Chevalier de la Légion d’Honneur and a Commander of the Order of St John of Jerusalem. He also served as vice-president of the Royal Life Saving Society.

He died at his home in Clifton, Bristol in January 1950, aged 78.

Parliament of the United Kingdom
Preceded by Athelstan Rendall	Member of Parliament for Thornbury; 1922 – 1923	Succeeded by Athelstan Rendall
Preceded by Sir John Harmood-Banner	Member of Parliament for Liverpool Everton; 1924 – 1929	Succeeded by Derwent Hall Caine
