= Thomas Grimston Estcourt =

English politician (1775–1853)

Personal details
- Born: 1775
- Died: 1853 (aged 77–78)
- Spouse: Eleanor Sutton
- Occupation: Politician

Thomas Grimston Estcourt (1775–1853), of New Park near Devizes, Wiltshire, later known as Thomas Grimston Bucknall Estcourt, was an English politician.

== Biography ==
He was the eldest son of Thomas Estcourt, Member of the Parliament of Great Britain (MP) for Cricklade. He was MP for Devizes. 23 January 1805 – February 1826 and for Oxford University 22 February 1826 – 1847.

After the death of his uncle, Harbottle Bucknall, rector of Pebmarsh, Essex, in early 1823, under the will of John Askell Bucknall, who had died in 1796, Estcourt inherited the estate of Oxhey, Hertfordshire, The will obliged him to take the name of Bucknall, he swiftly obtained permission to add his former surname to it, and was afterwards known as Bucknall Estcourt.

== Family ==
Estcourt married Eleanor Sutton, daughter of James Sutton. Their sons were:

- T. H. S. Sotheron-Estcourt, eldest son.
- James Bucknall Bucknall Estcourt was their second son.
- Edmund Hiley Bucknall Estcourt
- Walter Grimston Bucknall Estcourt R.N. (1807–1845) was their fourth son.
- William John Bucknall Estcourt
- Edward Dugdale Bucknall Estcourt

Their daughters were Eleanor Anne, Georgina Charlotte (died young) and Mary Anne Harriet.

Parliament of the United Kingdom
Preceded by Joshua Smith; Henry Addington	Member of Parliament for Devizes; 1805–1826; With: Joshua Smith 1805–1818; John Pearse 1818–1826	Succeeded by John Pearse; George Watson-Taylor
Preceded by Robert Peel; Richard Heber	Member of Parliament for Oxford University; 1826–1847; With: Robert Peel 1826–1829; Sir Robert Inglis 1829–1847	Succeeded by Sir Robert Inglis; William Ewart Gladstone
