= Athelstan Rendall =

British politician (1871–1948)

Athelstan Rendall

Athelstan Rendall (16 November 1871 – 12 July 1948) was a Liberal Party, later Labour politician in the United Kingdom.

== Family and education ==
Rendall was the son of Henry Rendall JP of Bridport in Dorset. He was educated at University College School. In 1897, he married Amy, daughter of J J Young JP of Northend, Portsmouth. They had one daughter. Amy Rendall died in 1945 and Rendall was remarried, in 1946, to Beatrice Sophia, the daughter of Captain A W Brooke-Smith RNR.

== Career ==
After first working as a journalist, Rendall trained as a solicitor, passing the Law Society final examinations in January 1894 and practising at Yeovil. After he left Parliament, Rendall reverted to the law and was a partner in the firm of Rendall, Litchfield and Co. of Bournemouth.

== Politics ==
In 1895, Rendall joined the Fabian Society but his political affiliation at this time was still Liberal, as reflected by his membership of the Cobden Club, and by 1905 he had been selected as a Liberal Parliamentary candidate.

He was elected as Member of Parliament (MP) for the Thornbury constituency in Gloucestershire at the 1906 general election, and held the seat until his defeat at the 1922 general election by the Conservative Party candidate Herbert Charles Woodcock. In 1918 Rendall had stood as a supporter of the Coalition government of David Lloyd George. He was not opposed by the Conservatives, though he did defeat a National Party candidate, and had presumably been in receipt of the Coalition Coupon. However, by 1920 he had fallen out with the Coalition, writing to his local Liberal Association to explain that he was dissatisfied by what he described as the government's tremendous and unjustified commitment of British money and lives in Mesopotamia at the same time as their inability to end waste and extravagance at home. He went and sat on the opposition benches.

After Liberal reunion he regained his Thornbury seat standing as a Liberal at the 1923 general election, but was defeated again at the 1924 general election. He did not stand for Parliament again.

In Parliament, Rendall interested himself particularly in divorce reform and was responsible for introducing legislation under which a widow could marry her deceased husband's brother. He also sat as a member of the House of Commons Select Committee on Debtors’ Imprisonment. He was also a committed supporter of Electoral reform and introduced a Proportional representation bill during the term of the first Labour government.

== Labour ==
Rendall was, as indicated by his membership of the Fabian Society, always on the New Liberal wing of the party and identified himself as a Radical. He was sympathetic to many of the aims of the Labour Party. In 1918, he joined a group of Left-wing Liberals, formed by Josiah Wedgwood. The aim of the group was to formulate the best course to be adopted by those calling themselves ‘advanced radicals’ against the background of the formation of the Labour Party. The membership of the group included E D Morel, Charles Trevelyan and Arthur Ponsonby. While they were sympathetic to Labour they never came to a collective decision about how to work best with it, whether to merge or simply co-operate. Wedgwood, Morel, Trevelyan and Ponsonby all defected to Labour in due course and in 1925, Rendall joined them.

Parliament of the United Kingdom
Preceded by Charles Colston	Member of Parliament for Thornbury; 1906–1922	Succeeded by Herbert Charles Woodcock
Preceded by Herbert Charles Woodcock	Member of Parliament for Thornbury; 1923–1924	Succeeded by Derrick Gunston
