= Roundway Park =

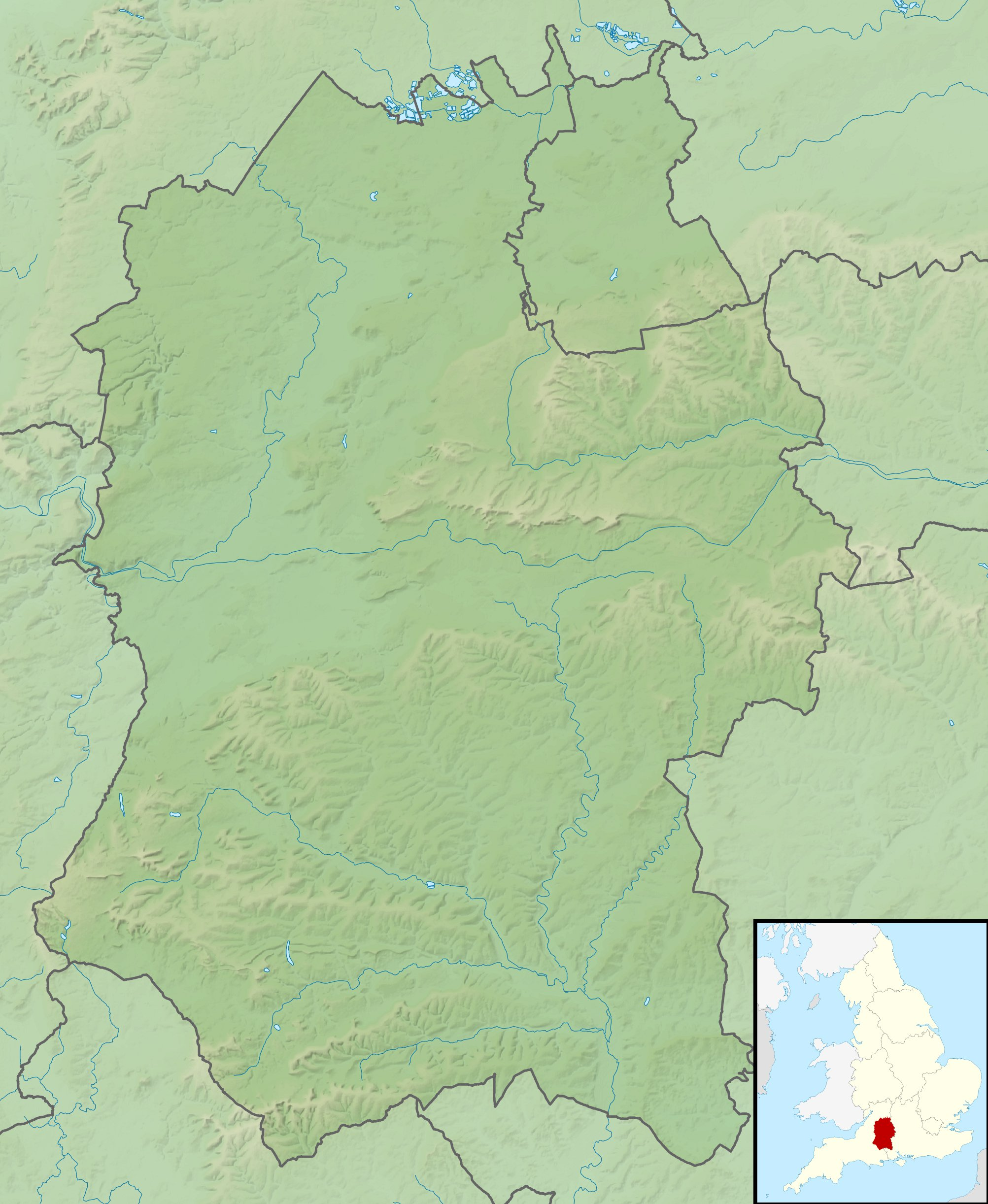
- Location within Wiltshire
- 51.363°N 1.9914°W
- Type: Former English country estate
- Location: Roundway, Wiltshire

History
- Built: 1777–1783
- Demolished: 1955

Site notes
- Architect: James Wyatt

Roundway Park (or New Park) was a 750-hectare (1,584-acre) estate in the former parish of Roundway in the centre of the English county of Wiltshire. The estate was about 1 1/4 miles (2 km) northeast of the town of Devizes and included a house, stables, gardens, farmland and woodland. After passing through several owners, the house was demolished in 1955 and the estate has since been divided up into residences and farmland.

== Willy-Sutton era ==
The land that New Park stood upon was originally owned by the Crown Estate and was later purchased by an unknown party. Roundway House was built in 1777–1783 by George Willy, whose son William Willy MP later inherited the estate. He died without issue in 1770 and the estate passed to his nephew Willey Sutton who died five years later.

The estate passed to Willey's younger brother James Sutton MP, recently married to Eleanor Addington, and he ordered alterations to the house. These were completed in Neoclassical style in 1777–1783 by architect James Wyatt and the house became known as New Park; the architecture resembles Wyatt's other works such as Heaton Hall. Changes to the landscape were designed by Humphry Repton. Sutton's daughter Eleanor inherited the estate in 1801 and lived there with her husband Thomas Grimston Estcourt MP until 1839 when the Dowager Sutton died.

== Colston era ==
The house was sold in 1840 to Edward Francis Colston, formerly of Filkin's Hall in Oxfordshire. Colston ordered alterations in 1841–2 including the construction of fencing around the estate, which caused local resentment, a new deer park and two driveways with gatehouses: one towards London Road and one towards the centre of Devizes, bringing about the street name 'New Park Street' (which still exists today). Church services for the villagers of Roundway were held in the house between 1937 and 1944.

The estate, now known as Roundway Park, continued in the Colston family until circa 1948; owners included Charles, 1st Baron Roundway (1854–1925) and Edward, 2nd Baron (1880–1944). Further renovations were made during the Colston's ownership including moving the main entrance to the courtyard, the addition of a porte-cochere and a semi-circular balustrade, refurbishing the greenhouse into a library, transforming the sash windows into mullion windows and the addition of bedrooms and bathrooms. The 2nd Baron's wife Gladys, Lady Roundway continued to live at Roundway Park until 1949 before moving to London, at which point the estate was divided up and sold.

== Fate ==
In 1949, the estate land of 1584 acres was sold to the Bristol Merchant Venturers for use by Henry Herbert Wills' charity for Chronic and Incurable Sufferers, although it is unknown what the involvement of Wills' charity was. Bristol Merchant Venturers still own the land and lease it to local farmers. In 2016, they built a modern housing estate on a small amount of land.

In 1954, Wiltshire County Council purchased the house, gardens and paddocks for Civil Defence purposes. After six years, the council sold the house, which was suffering from dry rot at this point, to Peter White, a property speculator. White demolished the north and west wings of the house, leaving only the stables, coach house and the east wing of the house, which was converted into a private residence. The stable block was recorded as Grade II listed in 1962.
