= Charles Colston, 1st Baron Roundway =

British politician

Colston in 1895.

Charles Edward Hungerford Atholl Colston, 1st Baron Roundway DL (16 May 1854 – 17 June 1925) was a British Conservative Party politician. He sat in the House of Commons from 1892 to 1906, and was later elevated to the peerage, taking his seat in the House of Lords.

== Early life and family ==
Colston was the son of Edward Colston, of Roundway Park near Devizes, Wiltshire, and his wife Louisa, daughter of Rev. Edward Murray from Northolt in Middlesex.

in 1879 he married Rosalind Emma Gostling-Murray, daughter of Col. Charles Gostling-Murray of Hounslow.

== Career ==
He was educated at Eton College and at Christ Church, Oxford, where he graduated in 1876 with a Bachelor of Arts (BA) degree.

He was High Sheriff of Wiltshire in 1885, and became a deputy lieutenant of Wiltshire in the same year. He was also a justice of the peace for Wiltshire.

At the 1885 general election he stood unsuccessfully in Bristol North. He was elected at the 1892 general election as the member of parliament (MP) for Thornbury, and held the seat until his defeat at the 1906 general election by the Liberal candidate Athelstan Rendall.

He was elevated to the peerage in the 1916 Birthday Honours, as Baron Roundway of Devizes.

Parliament of the United Kingdom
Preceded by John William Plunkett	Member of Parliament for Thornbury; 1892 – 1906	Succeeded by Athelstan Rendall
Peerage of the United Kingdom
New creation	Baron Roundway; 1916–1925	Succeeded by Edward Murray Colston
