= Battle of Roundway Down =

1643 battle of the First English Civil War

- Part of First English Civil War
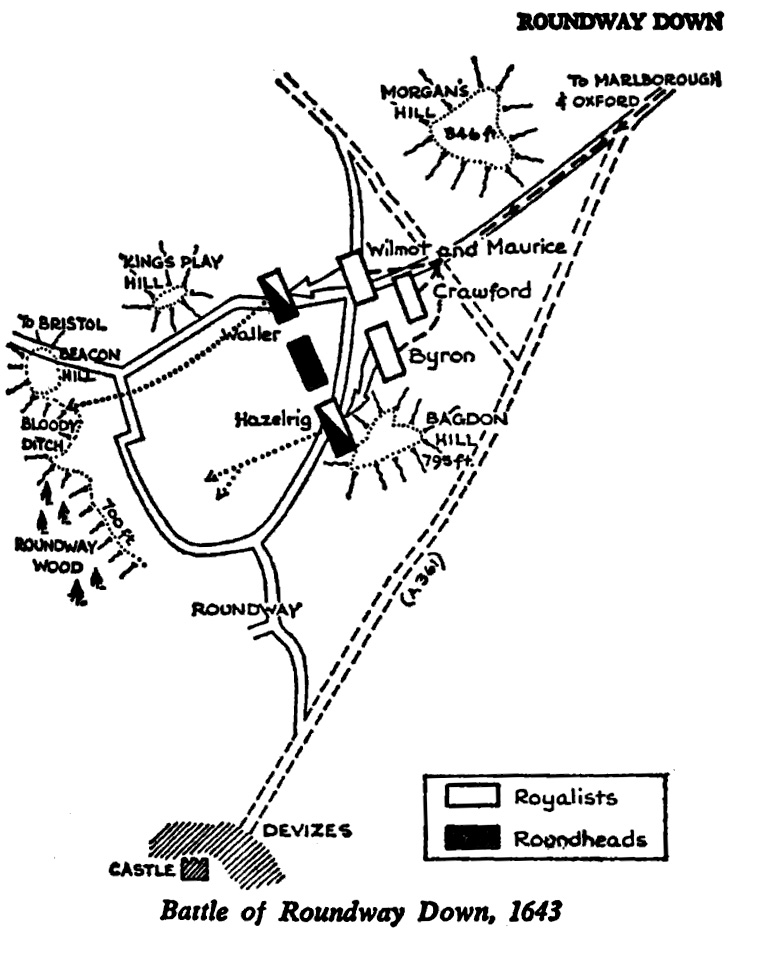
- Map of the battle by John Kinross
| Date | 13 July 1643 |
| Location | Roundway Down, near Devizes, Wiltshire 51.385°N 1.980°W |
| Result | Royalist victory |

Belligerents
| Royalists | Parliamentarians |

Commanders and leaders
| Lord Wilmot; Sir John Byron; Earl of Crawford; Sir Ralph Hopton | Sir William Waller; Sir Arthur Haselrig |

Strength
| 1,800 horse | 2,500 horse c. 2,500 foot 8 guns |

Casualties and losses
| Minimal | 600 killed 1,200 captured |

The Battle of Roundway Down was fought on 13 July 1643 at Roundway Down near Devizes, in Wiltshire during the First English Civil War. Despite being outnumbered and exhausted after riding overnight from Oxford, a Royalist cavalry force under Lord Wilmot won a crushing victory over the Parliamentarian Army of the West under Sir William Waller.

Viewed as their most decisive victory of the war, the Royalists secured control of South West England which they held until late 1645. Two weeks later they captured the port of Bristol, allowing them to establish links with supporters in Ireland.

== Prelude ==
After the hard fought Battle of Lansdown, the Royalists withdrew from Lansdown to Marshfield, hoping to obtain reinforcements and supplies from their wartime capital of Oxford. They arrived in Chippenham on 7 July. Meanwhile, despite his retreat, Waller's army was largely intact after the battle and losses were quickly replaced by the Parliamentarian garrison in Bristol. Hopton's precarious position provided Waller an opportunity to crush him if he moved fast enough and Waller set out from Bath with 5,000 troops, reaching Chippenham on 9 July.

As the Parliamentarians approached, Hopton marched south to Devizes, followed by Waller who occupied Roundway Down, high ground approximately 2 kilometres north of the town. Short of materials and outnumbered, the Royalists agreed that Prince Maurice and 300 cavalry would break out and race to Oxford for reinforcements, leaving Hopton and the 3,000 Cornish foot to hold Devizes. Departing at midnight on 10 July, Maurice reached Oxford next morning; most of the Royalist field army was absent but Lord Wilmot assembled 1,500 cavalry, then set out for Devizes with Maurice and his men.

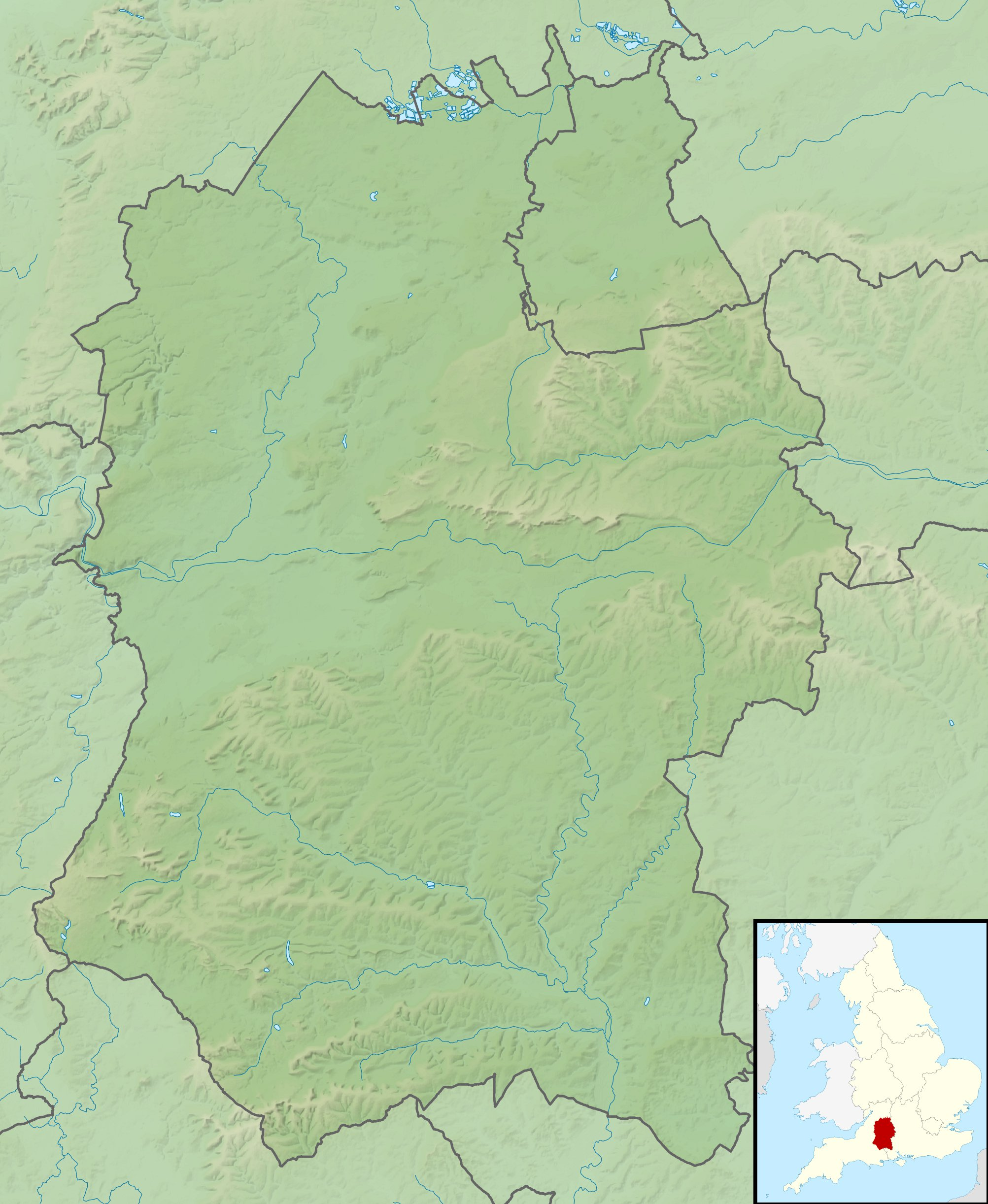
Wiltshire and Roundway Down

== Siege of Devizes ==
On 11 July, Waller brought his army down from Roundway Down and deployed them on the east side of Devizes. To support an attack, he set up an artillery battery within range of the town on Coatefield Hill. Stalling for time, Hopton asked for and received a truce to allow time for negotiations. Overnight as the Parliamentarians waited for Hopton's response, their cavalry intercepted and captured a Royalist convoy of gunpowder and ammunition that had previously been dispatched to resupply Hopton after the Battle at Lansdowne. Many of their escort escaped but 200 were captured along with the wagons.

On the morning of 12 July, Waller ended talks and began an assault, first bombarding the town with artillery before his infantry attacked the outworks and fortifications. Despite hours of fierce hand-to-hand combat, at the end of the day the Royalists remained in control of Devizes. Early next morning, Wilmot's relief force neared Roundway Down, and as they did so fired several cannon to warn Hopton of their approach. Waller now abandoned the siege and marched his force north to intercept them; reaching the high ground, the infantry and artillery were placed in the centre, with Waller commanding the cavalry on the left and Sir Arthur Haselrig the right.

== Battle ==
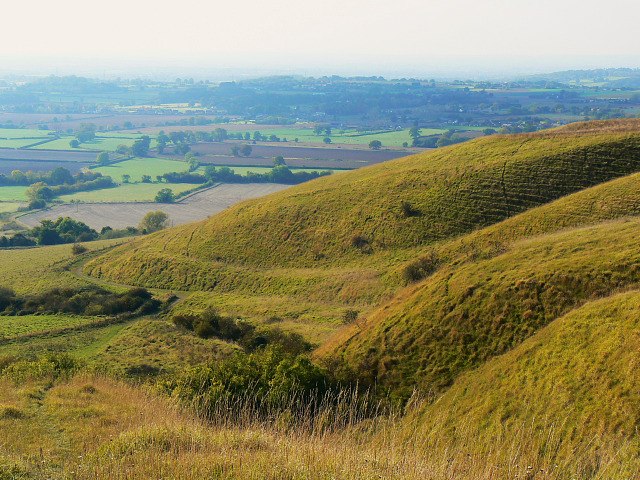
The view from the scarp known as 'Oliver's Castle' into the 'Bloody Ditch'

The Royalist cavalry was divided into three brigades; as well as being in overall command, Wilmot led the brigade on the left, with Sir John Byron on the right, and the Earl of Crawford in reserve. Despite having ridden all night, Wilmot attacked immediately and caught Waller out of position, with Haselrig and his regiment of "London lobsters" in an exposed forward position. Haselrig tried to rally his men but withdrew when he saw Byron preparing to attack, and rejoined the rest of Waller's cavalry.

As Waller advanced down the hill, Byron continued his attack supported by Wilmot and the Royalist reserve under Crawford; with their infantry unable to fire for fear of hitting their own men, the Parliamentarian cavalry were swept from the field. Pursued by the Royalists, some of them rode over the edge of a 300 feet (91 m) steep precipice and into an area that became known as "the Bloody Ditch".

Now isolated and with 3,000 Royalists from Devizes advancing against their rear, Waller ordered his infantry into defensive squares and began withdrawing towards the northwest. After approximately an hour, Byron's cavalry returned from their pursuit and captured the Parliamentarian artillery which they turned on the retreating enemy, quickly causing them to break apart. Fleeing in all directions, many were cut down by Wilmot's men; Waller and the remnants of his cavalry escaped toward Bristol, leaving the remainder to surrender.

== Aftermath ==
The Parliamentarian army in the west was virtually wiped out, with losses estimated to be as many as 600 killed and 1,200 captured, along with their artillery, wagons, gunpowder, ammunition, and supplies. In his letter reporting the victory, Byron lists Royalist losses as "very few killed, but many hurt", although this applies only to officers and other "gentlemen". Arguably the most comprehensive Royalist victory of the war, it secured the south-west and less than two weeks later they captured the vital port of Bristol, allowing them to establish links with their supporters in Ireland.

The battle was an outstanding victory for the Royalists; despite travelling over 60 kilometres directly onto the battlefield, 1,800 cavalry defeated a superior force of 5,000 including cavalry, infantry, and artillery. They were helped by the high quality of Wilmot's force, which contained some of the most experienced units in the Royalist army, and the "deplorable tactics" employed by Haselrig, who awaited Wilmot's charge at the halt, hoping their carbine fire would drive them off. This was a mistake commonly made by Parliamentarian cavalry leaders in the early stages of the war. Conversely, Waller's reputation as a military leader suffered because of the loss, even though historians claim that his leadership at both Lansdowne and Roundway Down was without fault.

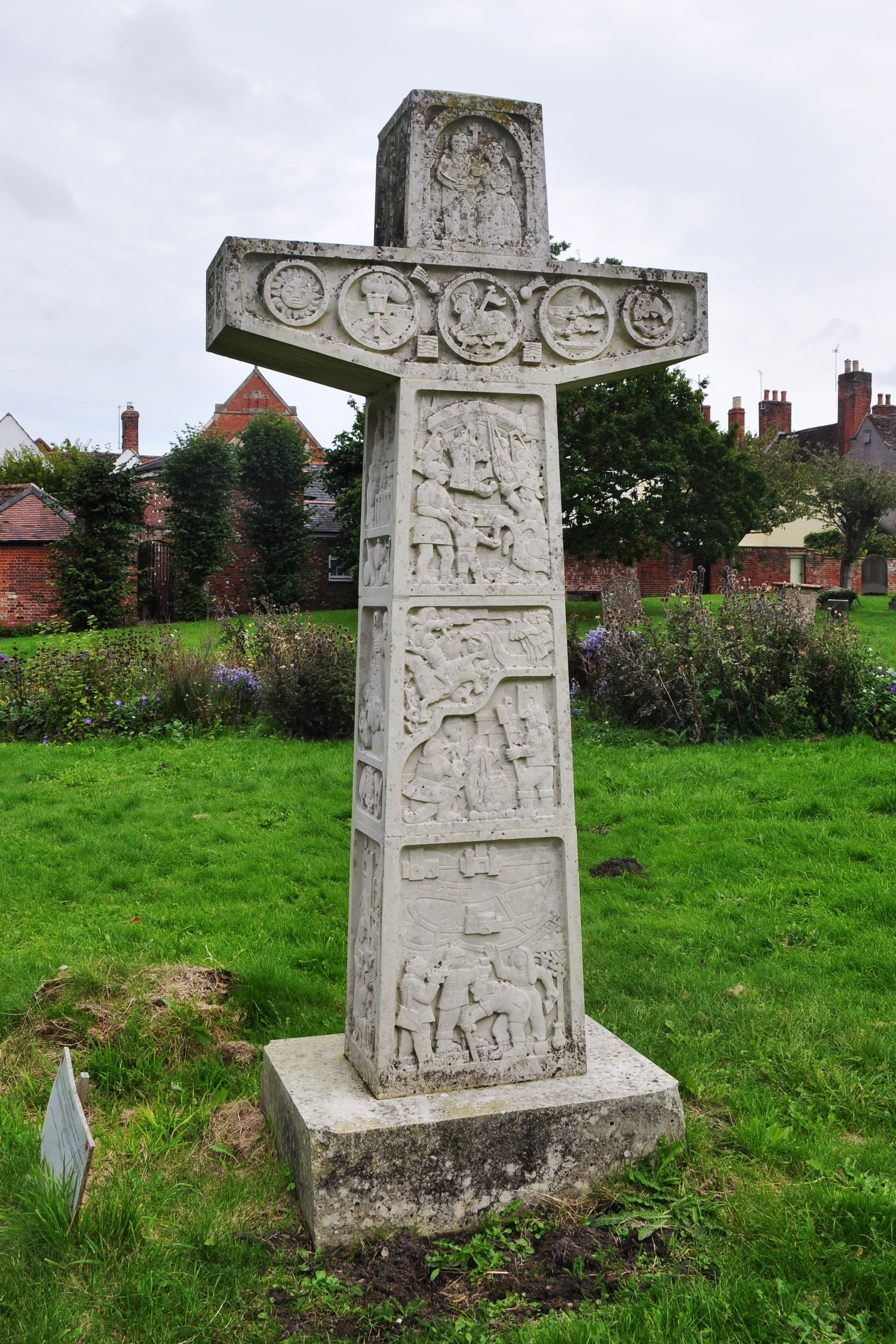
The Millennium Monument, erected at the Church of St. John the Baptist, Devizes in 2000, includes scenes from the battle (second panel from the base).

The village of Roundway is today a small hamlet 2 kilometres north of Devizes with a population of approximately 25 residents. Discussions regarding permanent burial sites for those who lost their lives in the battle are under consideration today.

== Sources ==
- Beale, Norman (2024). "New evidence for the possible location of the dead buried after the Battle of Roundway Down, July 1643". Wiltshire Archaeological and Natural History Magazine. 117: 207–213.
- "The Battle of Roundway Down, Devizes July 13th, 1643". Devizes Heritage. Archived from the original on 28 February 2012.
- "English Heritage Battlefield Report: Roundway Down 1643" (PDF). WaybackMachine. Internet Archive. 1995. Archived from the original (PDF) on 14 February 2012.
- "Known Grave Sites and Potential Burial Places for those Killed at the Battle of Roundway Down on July 13th, 1643". Wayback Machine. Internet Archive. 11 August 2010. Archived from the original on 11 August 2010.
- Plant, David (1 December 2009). "The Battle of Lansdown Hill, 1643". BCW Project. David Plant.
- Plant, David (1 December 2009). "The Battle of Roundway Down, 1643". BCW Project. David Plant.
- Royle, Trevor (2004). Civil War: The Wars of the Three Kingdoms 1638–1660 (2006 ed.). Abacus. ISBN 978-0-349-11564-1.
- Young, Peter (1953). "The Royalist Army at the Battle of Roundway Down 13 July 1643". Society for Army Historical Research. 31 (127): 127–131. JSTOR 44228735.
