= Thornbury (constituency) =

Parliamentary constituency in the United Kingdom, 1885–1950

- Former county constituency for the House of Commons
- County: Gloucestershire
- Major settlements: Thornbury

1885–1950
- Seats: One
- Created from: West Gloucestershire
- Replaced by: Stroud & Thornbury

Thornbury was a county constituency centred on the town of Thornbury in Gloucestershire. It returned one Member of Parliament (MP) to the House of Commons of the Parliament of the United Kingdom, elected by the first past the post voting system.

== History ==
The constituency was created by the Redistribution of Seats Act 1885 for the 1885 general election, and abolished for the 1950 general election.

== Boundaries ==
1885–1918: The Sessional Divisions of Chipping Sodbury, Thornbury, and Lawford's Gate except the part included in the parliamentary borough of Bristol.

1918–1950: The Urban District of Kingswood, and the Rural Districts of Sodbury, Thornbury, and Warmley.

== Members of Parliament ==
Election	Member	Party
1885	Stafford Howard	Liberal
1886	John Plunkett (Lord Dunsany from 1889)	Conservative
1892	Charles Colston	Conservative
1906	Athelstan Rendall	Liberal
1916	Athelstan Rendall	Coalition Liberal
1920	Athelstan Rendall	Liberal
1922	Herbert Charles Woodcock	Conservative
1923	Athelstan Rendall	Liberal
1924	Sir Derrick Gunston, Bt.	Unionist
1945	Joseph Alpass	Labour
1950	constituency abolished	

== Elections ==
=== Elections in the 1880s ===
General election 1885: Thornbury
Party	Candidate	Votes	%
Liberal	Stafford Howard	4,834	50.8
Conservative	Benjamin St John Ackers	4,689	49.2
Majority		145	1.6
Turnout		9,523	84.0
Registered electors		11,333	
Liberal win (new seat)			

General election 1886: Thornbury
Party	Candidate	Votes	%	±%
Conservative	John Plunkett	4,935	54.9	+5.7
Liberal	Stafford Howard	4,054	45.1	−5.7
Majority		881	9.8	N/A
Turnout		8,989	79.3	−4.7
Registered electors		11,333		
Conservative gain from Liberal		Swing	-5.7	

=== Elections in the 1890s ===
Colston

General election 1892: Thornbury
Party	Candidate	Votes	%	±%
Conservative	Charles Colston	5,202	51.1	−3.8
Liberal	Stafford Howard	4,978	48.9	+3.8
Majority		224	2.2	−7.6
Turnout		10,180	85.8	+6.5
Registered electors		11,867		
Conservative hold		Swing	-3.8	

Allen

General election 1895: Thornbury
Party	Candidate	Votes	%	±%
Conservative	Charles Colston	5,727	55.3	+4.2
Liberal	Arthur Acland Allen	4,638	44.7	−4.2
Majority		1,089	10.6	+8.4
Turnout		10,635	85.0	−0.8
Registered electors		12,195		
Conservative hold		Swing	+4.2	

=== Elections in the 1900s ===
General election 1900: Thornbury
Party	Candidate	Votes	%	±%
Conservative	Charles Colston	Unopposed		
Conservative hold				

General election 1906: Thornbury
Party	Candidate	Votes	%	±%
Liberal	Athelstan Rendall	7,370	58.4	New
Conservative	Charles Colston	5,240	41.6	N/A
Majority		2,130	16.8	N/A
Turnout		12,610	89.5	N/A
Registered electors		14,096		
Liberal gain from Conservative		Swing	N/A	

=== Elections in the 1910s ===
General election January 1910: Thornbury
Party	Candidate	Votes	%	±%
Liberal	Athelstan Rendall	7,270	53.8	−4.6
Conservative	Cyril Augustus Ward	6,251	46.2	+4.6
Majority		1,019	7.6	−9.2
Turnout		13,521	91.7	+2.2
Liberal hold		Swing	-4.6	

George Cockerill

General election December 1910: Thornbury
Party	Candidate	Votes	%	±%
Liberal	Athelstan Rendall	6,820	53.9	+0.1
Conservative	George Cockerill	5,837	46.1	−0.1
Majority		983	7.8	+0.2
Turnout		12,657	85.9	−5.8
Liberal hold		Swing	+0.1	

General Election 1914–15:

Another General Election was required to take place before the end of 1915. The political parties had been making preparations for an election to take place and by July 1914, the following candidates had been selected;

- Liberal: Athelstan Rendall
- Unionist: George Cockerill

Athelstan Rendall

General election 1918: Thornbury
Party		Candidate	Votes	%	±%
C	National Liberal	Athelstan Rendall	9,999	62.0	+8.1
	National	Thomas Pilcher	6,132	38.0	−8.1
Majority			3,687	24.0	+16.2
Turnout			16,131	47.6	−38.3
Registered electors			33,862		
	National Liberal hold		Swing	+8.1	
C indicates candidate endorsed by the coalition government.

=== Elections in the 1920s ===
General election 1922: Thornbury
Party	Candidate	Votes	%	±%
Unionist	Herbert Charles Woodcock	10,682	39.5	+1.5
Liberal	Athelstan Rendall	10,578	39.2	−22.8
Labour	Joseph Alpass	5,749	21.3	New
Majority		104	0.3	−23.7
Turnout		27,009	77.9	+30.3
Registered electors		34,655		+2.3
Unionist gain from National Liberal		Swing		

General election 1923: Thornbury
Party	Candidate	Votes	%	±%
Liberal	Athelstan Rendall	16,722	62.0	+22.8
Unionist	Herbert Charles Woodcock	10,252	38.0	−1.5
Majority		6,470	24.0	+2.7
Turnout		26,974	75.6	−2.3
Registered electors		35,695		+3.0
Liberal gain from Unionist		Swing	+12.2	

General election 1924: Thornbury
Party	Candidate	Votes	%	±%
Unionist	Derrick Gunston	12,500	42.9	+4.9
Liberal	Athelstan Rendall	10,283	35.3	−26.7
Labour	Godfrey Elton	6,376	21.9	New
Majority		2,217	7.6	N/A
Turnout		29,159	79.5	+3.9
Registered electors		36,672		+2.7
Unionist gain from Liberal		Swing	+15.8	

General election 1929: Thornbury
Party	Candidate	Votes	%	±%
Unionist	Derrick Gunston	13,914	34.0	−8.9
Liberal	John Adam Day	13,614	33.2	−2.1
Labour	Godfrey Elton	13,445	32.8	+10.9
Majority		300	0.8	−6.8
Turnout		40,973	82.5	+3.0
Registered electors		49,645		+35.4
Unionist hold		Swing	-3.4	

=== Elections in the 1930s ===
General election 1931: Thornbury
Party	Candidate	Votes	%	±%
Conservative	Derrick Gunston	23,072	55.1	+21.1
Labour	George Pearce Blizard	11,008	26.3	−6.5
Liberal	J. Howard Whitehouse	7,826	18.7	−14.5
Majority		12,064	28.8	+28.0
Turnout		41,906	79.7	−2.8
Registered electors		52,547		+5.8
Conservative hold		Swing	+13.8	

General election 1935: Thornbury
Party	Candidate	Votes	%	±%
Conservative	Derrick Gunston	19,180	47.4	−7.7
Labour	F. A. Heron	15,164	37.5	+11.2
Liberal	Wilfred John Jenkins	6,104	15.1	−3.6
Majority		4,016	9.9	−18.9
Turnout		40,448	71.5	−8.2
Registered electors		56,582		+7.7
Conservative hold		Swing	-9.4	

General Election 1939–40: Another General Election was required to take place before the end of 1940. The political parties had been making preparations for an election to take place and by the Autumn of 1939, the following candidates had been selected;

- Conservative: Derrick Gunston
- Labour: Joseph Alpass
- Liberal: Raymond Walton

=== Elections in the 1940s ===
General election 1945: Thornbury
Party	Candidate	Votes	%	±%
Labour	Joseph Alpass	28,364	49.3	+11.8
Conservative	Derrick Gunston	18,927	32.9	−14.5
Liberal	Ronald W Brighton	10,262	17.8	+2.7
Majority		9,437	16.4	N/A
Turnout		57,553	76.4	+4.9
Registered electors		75,286		+33.1
Labour gain from Conservative		Swing	+13.2	
