= Cope (surname) =

Cope is a surname, and may refer to

- Amber Cope, American racing driver and niece of Derrike Cope
- Angela Ruch, (née Cope) American racing driver and twin of Amber Cope.
- Sir Anthony Cope (c. 1486–1551)
- Arabella Diana Cope (1769–1829), British noblewoman
- Arthur C. Cope (1909–1966), American organic chemist
- Arthur Stockdale Cope (1857–1940), English portrait painter
- Bob Cope, American football coach
- Charles West Cope (1811–1890), English artist
- Cuthbert Leslie Cope (1903–1975), English physician
- Davey Cope (1877–1898), South African rugby union player
- David Cope, artificial intelligence and music researcher
- David Cope (economist), British energy & resource economist
- Derrike Cope, American racing driver
- Edward Drinker Cope, American anatomist and paleontologist
- Edward Meredith Cope, English classical scholar
- Frederick Cope, Canadian politician
- Geoff Cope, English cricketer
- George Cope (tobacco manufacturer), English industrialist
- Gilbert Cope (1840–1928), American historian and genealogist
- Harold Cope (1902–1980), English footballer
- Jack Cope, South African writer
- James Cope (UK politician), British MP and Resident to the Hanseatic League in the mid-eighteenth century
- Jamie Cope, English snooker player
- Jean-François Copé, French politician
- Jean-Baptiste Cope, Mi'kmaq sakamaw (leader of the Mi'kmaq people)
- Jim Cope (1911–1999), Australian politician
- John Cope (British Army officer), English general during the 1745 Jacobite Uprising
- John Cope, Baron Cope of Berkeley, English politician
- Julian Cope, English musician
- Kenneth Cope, English actor
- Kenneth Cope (musician), American composer
- Kit Cope, American martial arts fighter
- Louise Todd Cope (1930–2020), American artist
- Marianne Cope, American nun and Catholic saint
- Mike Cope, American racing driver
- Myron Cope, American radio personality
- Nick Cope, English musician
- Peter Cope, American test pilot
- Richard Cope (1776–1856), English congregationalist minister and religious writer
- Sidney Cope (1904–1986), English cricketer
- Thomas Cope (1827–1884), English tobacco manufacturer
- Tom Cope, English footballer
- Thomas D. Cope, American historian and physicist
- Warner Cope, American judge
- Wendy Cope, English poet
- Zachary Cope, English physician and surgeon

== Cope family ==
The Cope family of Loughgall, County Armagh is a historic family in British politics.

=== Members ===
- Robert Cope
- Robert Camden Cope
- Anthony Cope

== See also ==
- Cope (disambiguation)
- Cape (surname)
