= Thomas Cope =

Thomas Cope may refer to:

- Thomas Cope (manufacturer) (1827–1884), English tobacco manufacturer
- Thomas Cope (judge) (1821–1891), judge in colonial Victoria (Australia)
- Thomas D. Cope (1880–1964), American physicist and historian of science
- Sir Thomas Cope, 1st Baronet (1840–1924), of the Cope baronets
- Sir Thomas George Cope, 2nd Baronet (1884–1966), of the Cope baronets
- Thomas Cope (politician) (c. 1814–1882), member of the Legislative Assembly of Victoria 1868–1877

== See also ==
- Cope (surname)
