= Liverpool Everton by-election =

Liverpool Everton by-election may refer to:

- Liverpool Everton by-election, 1892
- Liverpool Everton by-election, 1905

See also

- Liverpool Everton (UK Parliament constituency)
