= 1913 Liverpool City Council election =

Liverpool City Council elections 1913

← 1912	November 1, 1913	1914 →

36 seats were up for election (one third): one seat for each of the 36 wards 69 (incl. Aldermen) seats needed for a majority

Elections to Liverpool City Council were held on 1 November 1913.

Due to the First World War this was the last contested local election, other than by-elections, until 1 November 1919.

Nineteen of the thirty-six seats were uncontested.

After the election, the composition of the council was:

Party	Councillors	±	Aldermen	Total
Conservative	??	+4	??	??
Liberal	??	-2	??	??
Irish Nationalist	??	0	??	??
Labour	??	0	0	??
Independent	??	0	0	??

== Election result ==
Liverpool local election result 1913
Party	Seats	Gains	Losses	Net gain/loss	Seats %	Votes %	Votes	+/−
Conservative	24	4	0	+4	67%			
Liberal	8	0	2	-2	22%			
Irish Nationalist	3	0	0	0	8%			
Independent	1	0	0	0	3%			
Labour	0	0	0	0	0%			

== Ward results ==
* - Retiring Councillor seeking re-election

Comparisons are made with the 1910 election results, as the retiring councillors were elected in that year.

=== Abercromby ===
No. 18 Abercromby
Party	Candidate	Votes	%	±%
Conservative	Joseph Walter Smith	unopposed		
Registered electors				
Conservative hold		Swing		

=== Aigburth ===
No. 36 Aigburth
Party	Candidate	Votes	%	±%
Conservative	William Parkfield Wethered *	unopposed		
Registered electors				
Conservative hold		Swing		

=== Allerton, Childwall and Little Woolton ===
No. 34 Allerton, Childwall and Little Woolton
Party	Candidate	Votes	%	±%
Conservative	Henry Glover	unopposed		
Registered electors				
Conservative win (new seat)				

=== Anfield ===
No. 26 Anfield
Party	Candidate	Votes	%	±%
Conservative	Edward Russell-Taylor *	unopposed		
Registered electors				
Conservative hold		Swing		

=== Breckfield ===
No. 5 Breckfield
Party	Candidate	Votes	%	±%
Conservative	William Rudd *	unopposed		
Registered electors				
Conservative hold		Swing		

=== Brunswick ===
No. 19 Brunswick
Party	Candidate	Votes	%	±%
Liberal	Patrick Charles Kelly *	861	55%	
Conservative	William Fraser	693	45%	
Majority		168		
Registered electors		2,640		
Turnout		1,554	59%	
Liberal hold		Swing		

=== Castle Street ===
No. 15 Castle Street
Party	Candidate	Votes	%	±%
Conservative	John Edward Rayner	unopposed		
Registered electors				
Conservative hold		Swing		

=== Dingle ===
No. 20 Dingle
Party	Candidate	Votes	%	±%
Conservative	Alfred James Branwood *	unopposed		
Registered electors				
Conservative hold		Swing		

=== Edge Hill ===
No. 18 Edge Hill
Party	Candidate	Votes	%	±%
Conservative	Frederick Bennett Brough *	1,323	51%	
Labour	Ernest Whiteley	1,294	49%	
Majority		29		
Registered electors		4,714		
Turnout		2,617	56%	
Conservative hold		Swing		

=== Everton ===
No. 21 Everton
Party	Candidate	Votes	%	±%
Conservative	Gerald Kyffin-Taylor M.P. *	Unopposed	N/A	N/A
Registered electors				
Conservative hold				

=== Exchange ===
No. 13 Exchange
Party	Candidate	Votes	%	±%
Liberal	Frederick Charles Bowring *	unopposed		
Registered electors				
Liberal hold		Swing		

=== Fairfield ===
No. 25 Fairfield
Party	Candidate	Votes	%	±%
Liberal	James Hughes junior *	1,297	51%	
Conservative	Kenneth Kusel	1,238	49%	
Majority		59		
Registered electors		4,045		
Turnout		2,535	63%	
Liberal hold		Swing		

=== Garston ===
No. 37 Garston
Party	Candidate	Votes	%	±%
Conservative	Frederick James Rawlinson *	1,234	63%	
Labour	George Porter	713	37%	
Majority		521		
Registered electors		2,353		
Turnout		1,947	83%	
Conservative hold		Swing		

=== Granby ===
No. 24 Granby
Party	Candidate	Votes	%	±%
Independent	Miss Eleanor Florence Rathbone *	Unopposed	N/A	N/A
Registered electors				
Independent hold				

=== Great George ===
No. 17 Great George
Party	Candidate	Votes	%	±%
Liberal	Samuel Skelton *	unopposed		
Registered electors				
Liberal hold		Swing		

=== Kensington ===
No. 19 Kensington
Party	Candidate	Votes	%	±%
Conservative	Samuel Mason Hatchinson *	1,617	63%	
Labour	Patrick McConville	946	37%	
Majority		671		
Registered electors		4,753		
Turnout		2,563	54%	
Conservative hold		Swing		

=== Kirkdale ===
No. 2 Kirkdale
Party	Candidate	Votes	%	±%
Conservative	John George Paris *	1,900	63%	
Labour	James Clayton	1,120	37%	
Majority		780		
Registered electors		6,542		
Turnout		3,020	46%	
Conservative hold		Swing		

=== Low Hill ===
No. 11 Low Hill
Party	Candidate	Votes	%	±%
Conservative	William Boote *	1,084	54%	
Labour	Joseph Patrick Cotter	918	46%	
Majority		166		
Registered electors		3,845		
Turnout		2,002	52%	
Conservative hold		Swing		

=== Much Woolton ===
No. 35 Much Woolton
Party	Candidate	Votes	%	±%
Conservative	James Marsh	unopposed		
Registered electors				
Conservative win (new seat)				

=== Netherfield ===
No. 3 Netherfield
Party	Candidate	Votes	%	±%
Conservative	William Ball *	1,116	60%	
Independent	Charles Rolls	758	40%	
Majority		357		
Registered electors		3,975		
Turnout		1,875	47%	
Conservative hold		Swing		

=== North Scotland ===
No. 7 North Scotland
Party	Candidate	Votes	%	±%
Irish Nationalist	William John Loughrey *	unopposed		
Registered electors				
Irish Nationalist hold		Swing		

=== Old Swan ===
No. 32 Old Swan
Party	Candidate	Votes	%	±%
Conservative	Charles Burchall *	1,056	64%	
Labour	Joseph Mooney	606	36%	
Majority		450		
Registered electors		3,909		
Turnout		1,662	43%	
Conservative hold		Swing		

=== Prince's Park ===
No. 23 Prince's Park
Party	Candidate	Votes	%	±%
Conservative	Charles Henry Rutherford *	unopposed		
Registered electors				
Conservative hold		Swing		

=== Sandhills ===
No. 1 Sandhills
Party	Candidate	Votes	%	±%
Liberal	Alfred Gates *	1,207	56%	
Conservative	William Brady Anderson	944	44%	
Majority		263		
Registered electors		3,423		
Turnout		2,151	63%	
Liberal hold		Swing		

=== St. Anne's ===
No. 14 St. Anne's
Party	Candidate	Votes	%	±%
Liberal	Dr. James Clement Baxter *	813	53%	
Conservative	Richard Joseph Ward	735	47%	
Majority		78		
Registered electors		2,665		
Turnout		1,548	58%	
Liberal hold		Swing		

=== St. Domingo ===
No. 6 St. Domingo
Party	Candidate	Votes	%	±%
Conservative	Dr. Charles Alexander Hill *	unopposed		
Registered electors				
Conservative hold		Swing		

=== St. Peter's ===
No. 16 St. Peter's
Party	Candidate	Votes	%	±%
Liberal	Lawrence Durning Holt	655	59%	
Conservative	James Caughey Walker	454	41%	
Majority		201		
Registered electors		1,591		
Turnout		1,109	70%	
Liberal hold		Swing		

=== Sefton Park East ===
No. 22 Sefton Park East
Party	Candidate	Votes	%	±%
Conservative	James Stuart Rankin *	unopposed		
Registered electors				
Conservative hold		Swing		

=== Sefton Park West ===
No. 21 Sefton Park West
Party	Candidate	Votes	%	±%
Liberal	Frank Campbell Wilson *	989	56%	
Conservative	Joseph Dalton Flood	774	44%	
Majority		215		
Registered electors		2,566		
Turnout		1,763	69%	
Liberal hold		Swing		

=== South Scotland ===
No. 8 South Scotland
Party	Candidate	Votes	%	±%
Irish Nationalist	Francis Joseph Harford *	unopposed		
Registered electors				
Irish Nationalist hold		Swing		

=== Vauxhall ===
No. 12 Vauxhall
Party	Candidate	Votes	%	±%
Irish Nationalist	Joseph Hughes *	unopposed		
Registered electors				
Irish Nationalist hold		Swing		

=== Walton ===
No. 27 Walton
Party	Candidate	Votes	%	±%
Conservative	Dr. John George Moyles *	1,780	79%	
Labour	William Cruikshanks	460	21%	
Majority		1,320		
Registered electors		5,349		
Turnout		2,240	42%	
Conservative hold		Swing		

=== Warbreck ===
No. 26 Warbreck
Party	Candidate	Votes	%	±%
Conservative	John Albert Thompson	1,114	52%	
Liberal	Thomas Fleming *	1,026	48%	
Majority		88		
Registered electors		4,327		
Turnout		2,140	49%	
Conservative gain from Liberal		Swing		

=== Wavertree ===
No. 30 Wavertree
Party	Candidate	Votes	%	±%
Conservative	Robert Stephen Porter *	unopposed		
Registered electors				
Conservative hold		Swing		

=== Wavertree West ===
No. 33 Wavertree West
Party	Candidate	Votes	%	±%
Conservative	Edwin Haigh	988	44%	
Liberal	Cecil Heywood Brunner *	726	33%	
Labour	Joseph Cleary	513	23%	
Majority		262		
Registered electors		3,726		
Turnout		2,227	60%	
Conservative gain from Liberal		Swing		

=== West Derby ===
No. 28 West Derby
Party	Candidate	Votes	%	±%
Conservative	Edward Henry Cooke	1,310	66%	
Liberal	Albert Edward Faulkner	673	34%	
Majority		637		
Registered electors		3,758		
Turnout		1,983	53%	
Conservative hold		Swing		

== Aldermanic Elections ==
=== Aldermanic Election 9 November 1913 ===
19 Aldermen were elected by the councillors on 9 November 1913 for a term of six years and assigned to the following wards.

- - re-elected aldermen.

Party	Alderman	Ward
Conservative	Louis Samuel Cohen JP *	Kensington
Conservative	Edward Hatton Cookson JP *	Dingle
Conservative	Richard Dart JP *	Fairfield
Conservative	John Duncan JP *	Everton
Conservative	Sir William Bower Forwood DL JP *	St. Peter's
Conservative	James Heald	Allerton, Childwall and Little Woolton
Conservative	Simon Jude *	Wavertree West
Conservative	Richard Kelly JP *	Edge Hill
Conservative	Frank John Leslie *	Kirkdale
Conservative	Arthur Stanley Mather	Much Woolton
Conservative	Maxwell Hyslop Maxwell JP *	West Derby
Conservative	William Muirhead JP	Netherfield
Conservative	William Radcliffe JP *	Garston
Conservative	William Roberts JP *	Walton
Conservative	Sir Thomas Bland Royden Bart. *	Sefton Park East
Conservative	Robert Edward Walkington Stephenson *	Wavertree
Irish Nationalist	John Gregory Taggart *	Great George
Conservative	Dr. John Utting *	Granby
Conservative	Hartley Wilson *	Low Hill

James Heald was nominated by the combined Urban District Councils of Allerton, Childwall and Little Woolton to be Alderman for no. 34 Allerton, Childwall and Little Woolton on 4 November 1913 under Section 3 (1) (a) of the Local Government Board's Provisional Order Confirmation (No. 14) Act 1913. Alderman Heald's term of office was due to expire on 9 November 1916.

Arthur Stanley Mather was nominated by the Much Woolton Urban District Council to be Alderman for No. 35 Much Woolton under Section 3 (1) (b) of the Local Government Board's Provisional Order Confirmation (No. 14) Act 1913. Alderman Mather's term of office was due to expire on 9 November 1919.

In addition, aldermen who were elected on 9 November 1910 were assigned to the following wards:

Party	Alderman	Ward
Conservative	William Bartlett	Brunswick
Liberal	Edmond Brownbill	South Scotland
Conservative	Edward James Chevalier	Aigburth
Conservative	Arthur Crosthwaite	Anfield
Conservative	Charles Herbert Giles	Prince's Park
Conservative	Jacob Reuben Grant	Old Swan
Liberal	John Lea	St. Domingo
Irish Nationalist	George Jeremy Lynskey	Vauxhall
Liberal	Richard Robert Meade-King	Sandhills
Conservative	Thomas Menlove	Breckfield
Conservative	Sir Charles Petrie	Warbreck
Irish Nationalist	Edward Purcell	North Scotland
Conservative	Archibald Tutton Salvidge	Abercromby
Conservative	Anthony Shelmerdine	Sefton Park West

=== Aldermanic Election 1 July 1914 ===
Caused by the resignation of Alderman Edward Purcell (Irish Nationalist, elected as an alderman by the Council on 9 November 1910) which was reported to the Council on 10 June 1914.

In his place Councillor Austin Harford (Irish Nationalist, South Scotland, elected 1 November 1911 was elected as an alderman by the councillors on 1 July 1914.

Party	Alderman	Ward	Term expires
Irish Nationalist	Austin Harford	No. 7 North Scotland	1916

=== Aldermanic Election 28 October 1914 ===
Caused by the death of Alderman Thomas Menlove (Conservative, elected as an alderman by the Council on 9 November 1910) on 30 November 1913, Councillor Sir John Sutherland Harmood Banner MP (Conservative, Exchange ward, elected 1 November 1912) was elected by the councillors as an alderman on 28 October 1914 and assigned as returning officer for the Breckfield ward.

Party	Alderman	Ward	Term expires
Conservative	Sir John Sutherland Harmood Banner MP	No. 5 Breckfield	1916

== By-elections ==
=== No. 17 Great George, 27 November 1913 ===
Caused by the election of Councillor William Muirhead JP (Conservative, Great George, elected 1 November 1912) as an alderman by the Council on 9 November 1913.

No. 17 Great George
Party	Candidate	Votes	%	±%
	Thomas Philip Maguire	478		
Conservative	James Caughey Walker	468		
Labour	Joseph Cleary	72		
Majority		10		
Registered electors				
Turnout				
		Swing		

=== No. 13 Exchange, ===
Following the death of Alderman Thomas Menlove (Conservative, elected as an alderman by the Council on 9 November 1910) on 30 November 1913, Councillor Sir John Sutherland Harmood Banner MP (Conservative, Exchange ward, elected 1 November 1912) was elected by the councillors as an alderman on 28 October 1914 and assigned as returning officer for the Breckfield ward.

=== No. 8 South Scotland, 14 July 1914 ===
Following the resignation of Alderman Edward Purcell Irish Nationalist, elected as an alderman by the Council on 9 November 1910) which was reported to the Council on 10 June 1914, Councillor Austin Harford (Irish Nationalist, South Scotland, elected 1 November 1911, was elected as an alderman by the Council on 1 July 1914, creating a vacancy for the South Scotland ward.

No. 8 South Scotland
Party	Candidate	Votes	%	±%
Irish Nationalist	Patrick Jeremiah Kelly	unopposed		
Registered electors				
Irish Nationalist hold		Swing		

== See also ==
- Liverpool City Council
- Liverpool Town Council elections 1835 - 1879
- Liverpool City Council elections 1880–present
- Mayors and Lord Mayors of Liverpool 1207 to present
- History of local government in England
