= John Willox =

John Willox may refer to:

- John Willock (c.1515–1585), or John Willox, Scottish reformer
- John A. Willox (1842–1905), British journalist, newspaper owner and politician
