= Crossley Hospital =

Crossley Hospital may refer to:

- Crossley Hospital, Ancoats, a Salvation Army Maternity hospital in Ancoats, Manchester
- Crossley Hospital East, a tuberculosis sanatorium in Delamere Forest, Cheshire, also known as the Manchester Sanitorium
- Crossley Hospital West, a tuberculosis sanatorium in Delamere Forest, Cheshire, also known as the Liverpool Sanitorium
