= Charles Cope =

Charles Cope may refer to:

- Charles West Cope (1811–1890), English painter
- Sir Charles Cope, 2nd Baronet (c. 1743–1781), British aristocrat
- Sir Charles Cope, 3rd Baronet (1770–1781), of the Cope baronets

== See also ==
- Cope (surname)
