= 1892 Liverpool Everton by-election =

UK parliamentary by-election

The 1892 Liverpool Everton by-election was a parliamentary by-election held in England on 15 February 1892 for the British House of Commons constituency of Liverpool Everton.

== Vacancy ==
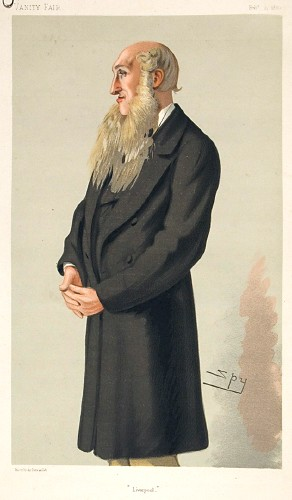
Edward Whitley MP, caricatured in Vanity Fair in 1880

The vacancy was caused by the death on 14 January of the Conservative Member of Parliament (MP) Edward Whitley. The 67-year-old Whitley was a former Mayor of Liverpool who had held the seat since its creation at the 1885 general election, and had previously been one of the three MPs for Liverpool from 1880 to 1885.

== Candidates ==
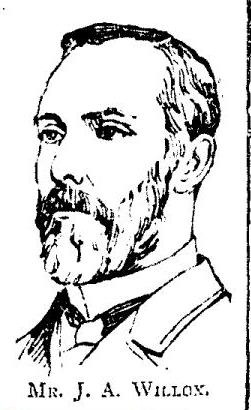
John A. Willox, pictured in the Pall Mall Gazette in July 1892

The Executive Committee of the Everton Conservatives met on 22 January to consider their choice of candidate for the by-election. They decided that three names should be proposed to a meeting of the party's Divisional Council: former Liverpool MP Lord Claud Hamilton, Councillor John Houlding, and former Birkenhead MP David MacIver. However, at the council meeting on 26 January Houlding declined the invitation to stand, and no other names were formally put to the meeting.

The Divisional Council met again on 2 February, with Houlding in the chair. Two names were proposed: MacIver, and the journalist John A. Willox. The meeting unanimously chose Willox, the owner of Cope Brothers tobacco merchants (based in Liverpool and London), and also the owner and editor of the Liverpool Courier newspaper.

The Liberal Party had intended to contest the election, and hoped that if the Conservatives had selected the brewer Houlding they would have gained the temperance vote. However, in the end they did not choose a candidate.

== Election ==
The writ was moved in the Commons on 10 February by Aretas Akers-Douglas, the MP for St Augustine's. 15 February had been selected as the day for nominations, and since Willox was the only candidate nominated, he was returned unopposed, without any need for a vote.

In honour of his election, over 100 journalists from Liverpool presented him with an illuminated address.

== Aftermath ==
Willox was re-elected with a large majority at the general election in July 1892, and was returned unopposed in 1895 and 1900. He was knighted in Queen Victoria's Diamond Jubilee Honours in 1897.

Sir John held the seat until serious illness prompted his resignation from Parliament in February 1905 by taking the Chiltern Hundreds, triggering another by-election. He died in June 1905, on his 63rd birthday.

== Results ==
Election	Political result	Candidate	Party	Votes	%	±%
By-election, February 1892 death of Whitley	Conservative hold	John Archibald Willox	Conservative	unopposed		
General election, July 1886	Conservative hold	Edward Whitley	Conservative	unopposed		

== See also ==
- Liverpool Everton constituency
- Everton
- List of United Kingdom by-elections (1885–1900)
