= Margaret Beavan =

English politician (1877-1931)

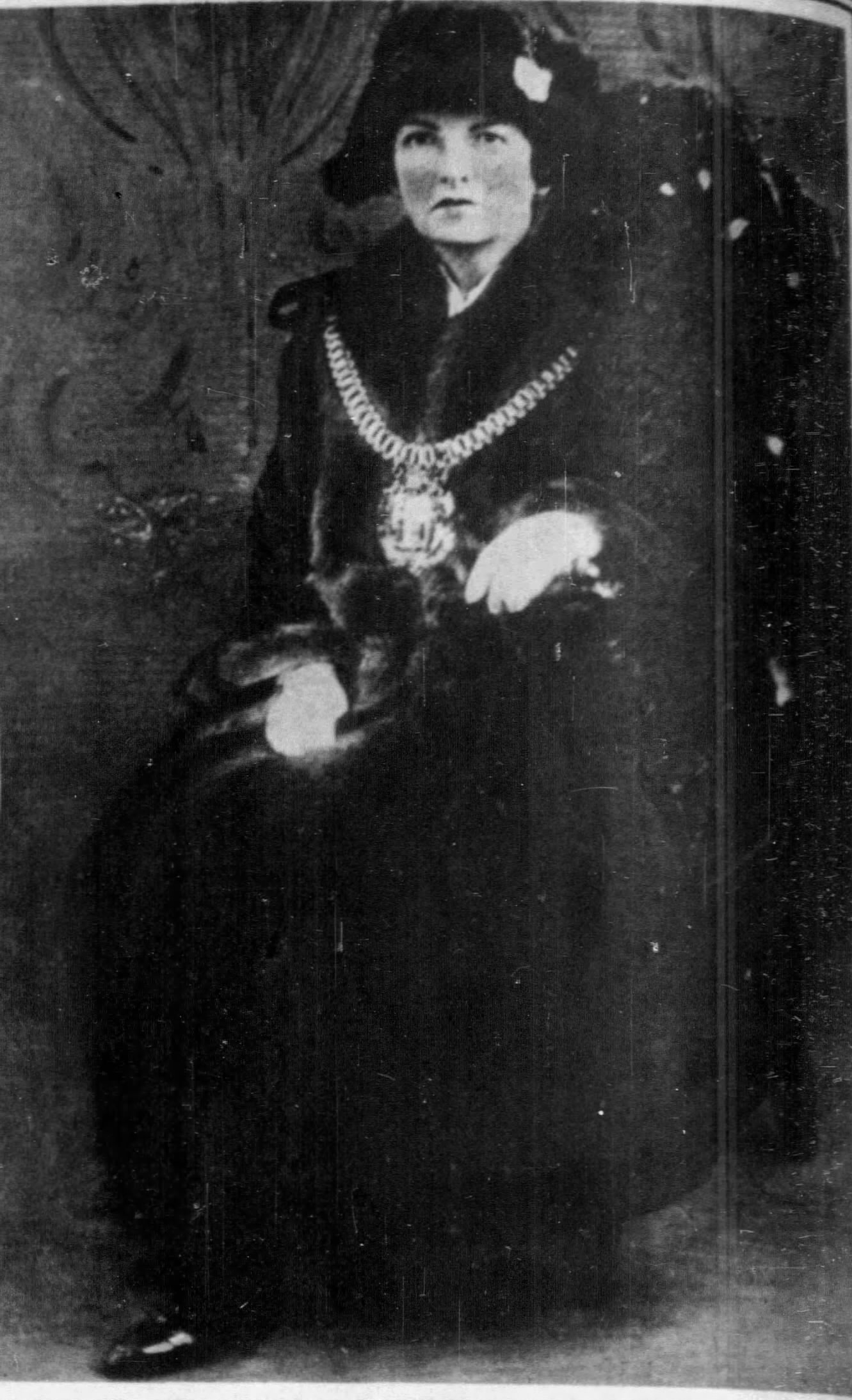
Beavan as Lord Mayor of Liverpool

Margaret Beavan (1877 – 22 February 1931) was an English politician who was the first female Lord Mayor of Liverpool in 1927.

Beaven attended Belvedere School, and then the Royal Holloway College. She was also educated at Liverpool Institute High School for Girls, in the same form as Maude Royden. Outside of her political career, she was a well known campaigner for the welfare of children and their mothers. She founded the Liverpool Child Welfare Association, Liverpool Open Air Hospital for Children, Royal Liverpool Babies Hospital, Ellen Gonner Convalescent Home, and the Tired Mothers' Rest Home.

In 1927, Beaven became the first woman Lord Mayor of Liverpool. At the 1929 United Kingdom general election, she stood unsuccessfully as a Conservative Party candidate in Liverpool Everton. She was also a member of the National Council of Women of Great Britain.
