= Cope Bros & Co =

Former tobacco company

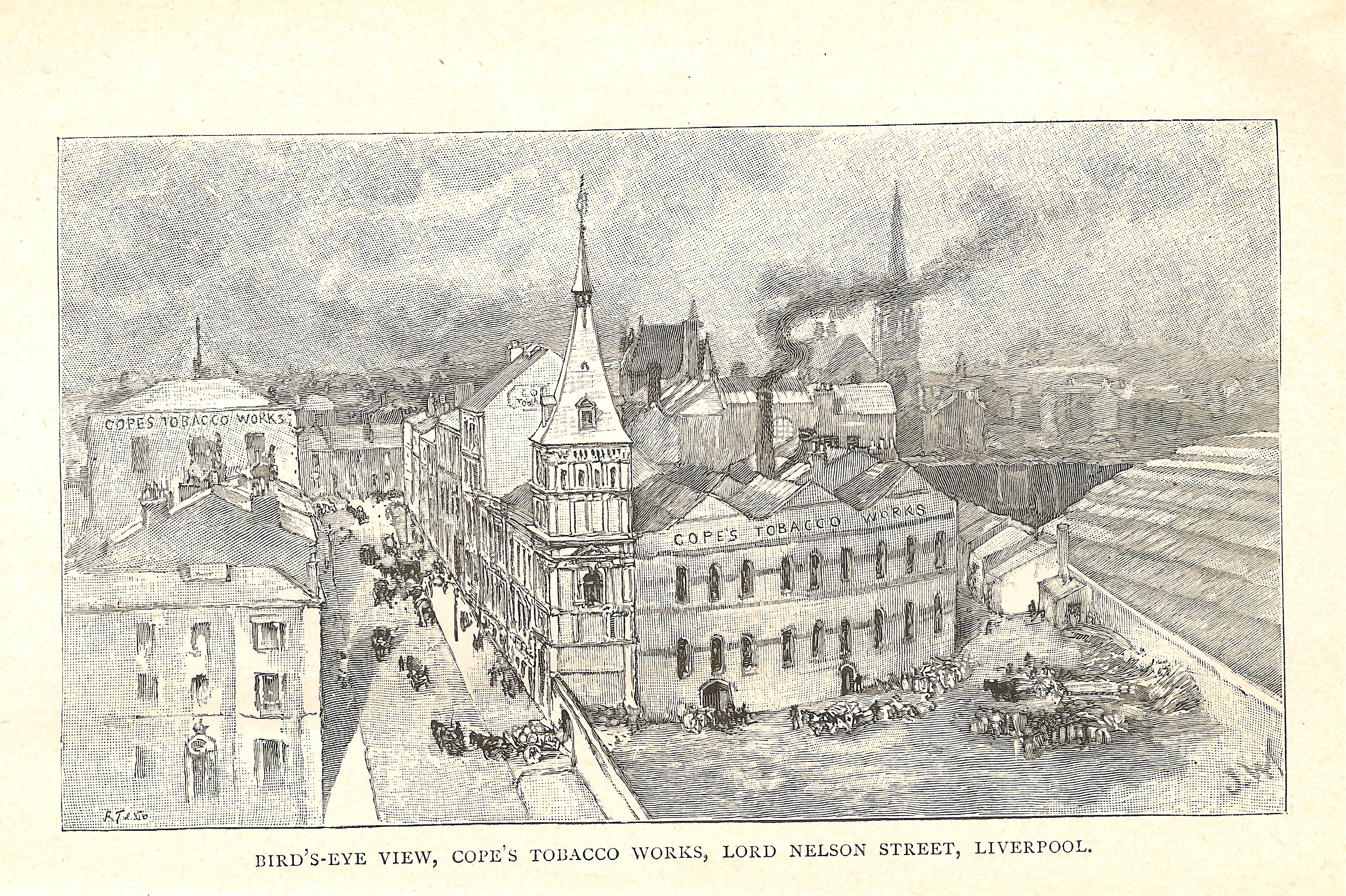
- Industry: Tobacco
- Founded: 1845
- Defunct: 1952
- Fate: Taken over by Gallaher in 1952
- Headquarters: Liverpool, UK
- Key people: Thomas Cope, George Cope
- Products: Cigarettes, cigars, snuff, tobacco
- Number of employees: 1500

Cope Bros & Co was a company based in Liverpool that manufactured tobacco products from 1848 until 1952.

== History ==
The company was started in 1848 in Old Post Office Street, Liverpool by Thomas Cope and George Cope.

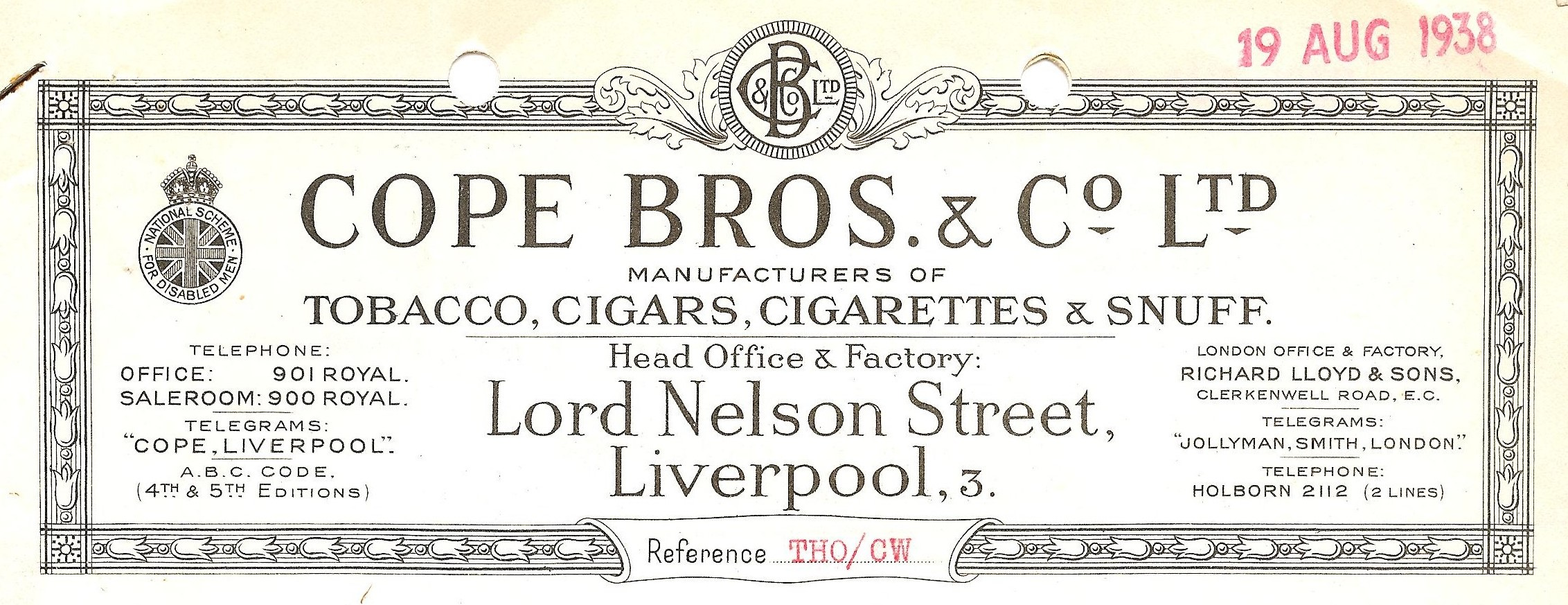
Copes Bill Header

In 1853 the business moved to the Old Church for the Blind in Lord Nelson Street, Liverpool. The company also obtained buildings and warehouses nearby over the following decades. By the 1880s the company was employing nearly 2000 staff and producing multiple brands of snuff, cigars, cigarettes and tobacco. It was estimated that in the late 1800s the company was contributing £400,000 in tax revenues to the Exchequer annually.

The Company became public in 1885 following the death of Thomas Cope in 1884. George Cope became the first managing director in 1885, and on his death in 1888 was succeeded by the newspaper-owner John A. Willox.

1904 was one of the company’s worst trading years as tobacco duty was increased.

John Arnold Cope, the son of Thomas, took over the running of the company and retired from the role of managing director in 1948 to become chairman. He retired completely in 1949 being the last Cope to be involved with the business. The company was taken over by Gallaher in 1952.

== Locally ==
The company employed mainly women and girls and was regarded by local press to be a model employer of the age with better working conditions than other employers. The company gave cooking lessons to the women and the company was also known to have an annual Soiree and ball that was often reported in local newspapers and other regions newspapers of the time. The factory in Lord Nelson Street Liverpool, and the Copes in particular, were praised for providing favourable working conditions for women by Charles Dickens and Emily Faithfull.

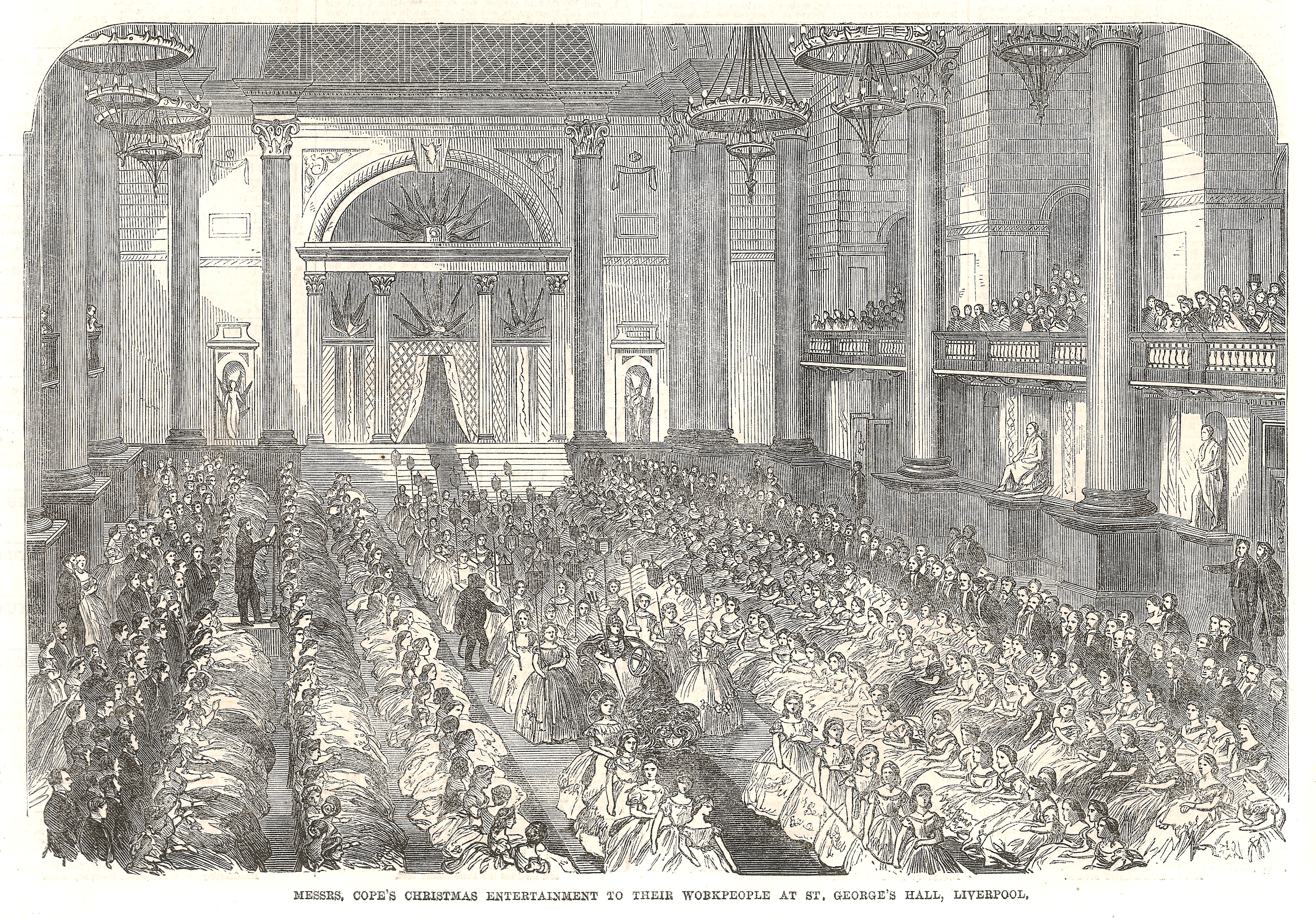
Copes Christmas Entertainment 1864 Illustrated London News

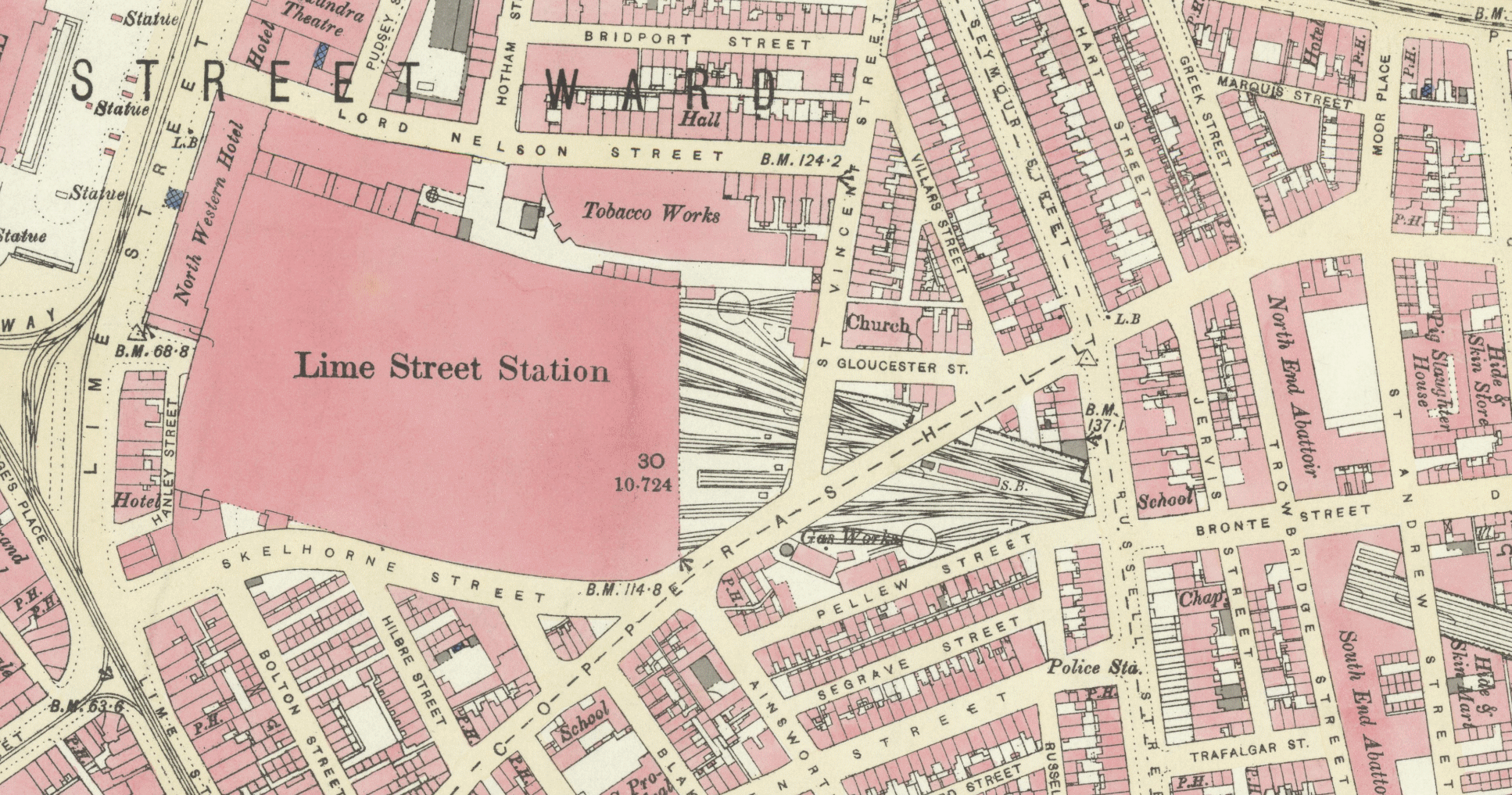
Lord Nelson Street Liverpool in 1890

== Marketing ==
Cope's held a leadership position in British advertising. Smoking had been common for centuries but the innovations comprised brand names, heavy advertising, and market segmentation according to class. An innovative appeal was to health consciousness; the ads directed at the middle-class promised that "smoke not only checks disease but preserves the lungs." A rugged heavy taste was pitched to working men, soldiers and sailors, while "delicately fragrant" was part of the appeal to the upper-class. The packaging was attractive, posters were omnipresent to show that smoking was a normal part of English life; lobbying was used to undercut the anti-tobacco lobby.

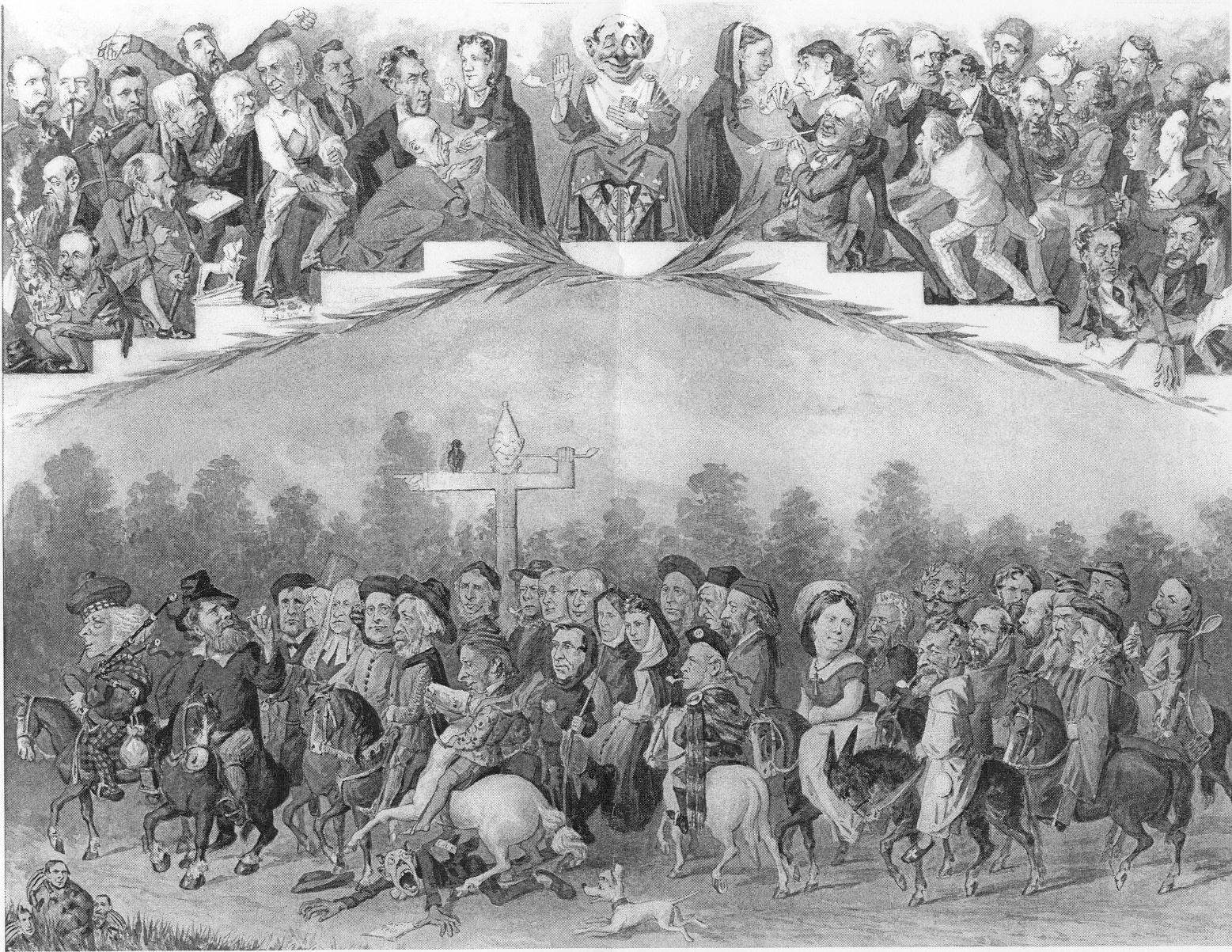
Illustration from Cope's by John Wallace (1841-1903). Below are Carlyle, Ruskin, Newman, Tennyson among others.

From 1889 the company produced their own publicity material and literature publishing Cope’s Tobacco Plant and Smoke Room booklets. The literature promoted the company’s products and also smoking in general and was combative in nature to the Anti-Smoking campaigns of the time. In 1893 John Ruskin took out an injunction against the company to stop them publishing his works in advertising. Many of the Cope Bros cigarette cards are still collected, bought and traded on auction web sites such as eBay.
