= Harmood-Banner baronets =

Extinct baronetcy in the Baronetage of the United Kingdom

The Harmood-Banner Baronetcy, of Liverpool in the County of Lancaster, was a title in the Baronetage of the United Kingdom. It was created on 26 February 1924 for the accountant, steel maker and Conservative politician John Harmood-Banner. The title became extinct on the death of the third Baronet in 1990.

== Harmood-Banner baronets, of Liverpool (1924) ==
- Sir John Sutherland Harmood-Banner, 1st Baronet (1847–1927)
- Sir Harmood Harmood-Banner, 2nd Baronet (1876–1950)
- Sir George Knowles Harmood-Banner, 3rd Baronet (1918–1990)

Coat of arms of Harmood-Banner of Liverpool
Crest 1st, In front of a sinister arm embowed in armour Proper, garnished Or, the hand grasping a spear in bend sinister also Proper, flowing therefrom a banner Gules, charged with a fleur-de-lis Argent, two fleur-de-lis also Argent (Banner); 2nd, Issuant from an antique crown Or, a demi-stag between two oak branches Proper (Harmood). Escutcheon Quarterly, 1st and 4th: Per pale Ermine and Or, a fleur-de-lis counterchanged, in chief a lion passant Gules (Banner); 2nd and 3rd: Chequy Or and Azure, on a bend engrailed ermine, an eagle displayed between two roses Gules, barbed and seeded Proper Motto Nil sine numine
