= John A. Willox =

British politician

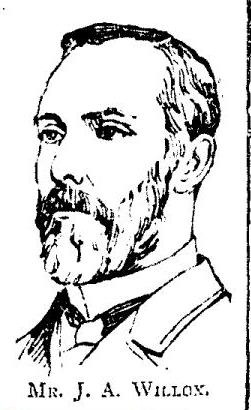
John Archibald Willox pictured in the Pall Mall Gazette following his election to Parliament

Sir John Archibald Willox (9 June 1842 – 9 June 1905) was a British journalist, newspaper owner and Conservative Party politician from Liverpool. He rose through the ranks to become the owner of the Liverpool Courier newspaper and sat in the House of Commons from 1892 to 1905.

== Early life ==
Willox was born in Edinburgh, the son of the journalist John Willox who also wrote several books related to shipping. His family moved to Liverpool, where he was educated at Liverpool College.

== Career ==
Leaving school in his mid-teens, Willox was apprenticed to the journalists Lee and Nightingale. They seconded him to the Liverpool Courier, which was then published twice each week. He became a sub-editor, then a partner in Tinling & Co which owned the paper. By 1863, aged only 21, he was the editor.

Under Willox's editorship, the paper promptly became a daily, with a Saturday Weekly Courier. The Evening Courier was established in 1870 and became the Evening Express.

He was a member of the Institute of Journalists and chairman of the Press Association in 1875 and 1900.

=== Tobacco and marriage ===
In 1884, he was an executor of the will of Thomas Cope, the founder of Cope Brothers tobacco merchants. He became a director of the company in 1885. When Thomas's brother George died in 1888 he became managing director, and married Thomas's widow, Sara (died 1904). who had ten children from her first marriage. She was a philanthropist, and 1897 she donated the £15,000 cost of constructing the Sanitorium for Consumptives at Delamere Forest in Cheshire.

=== Electricity ===
Willox took an interest in the commercial development of electricity, and became a director of several companies in that field. He became chairman of the Blackheath and Greenwich District Electric Light Company, and also of the New St Helens and District Tramway Company and the South Lancashire Electric Traction and Power Company.

=== Politics ===
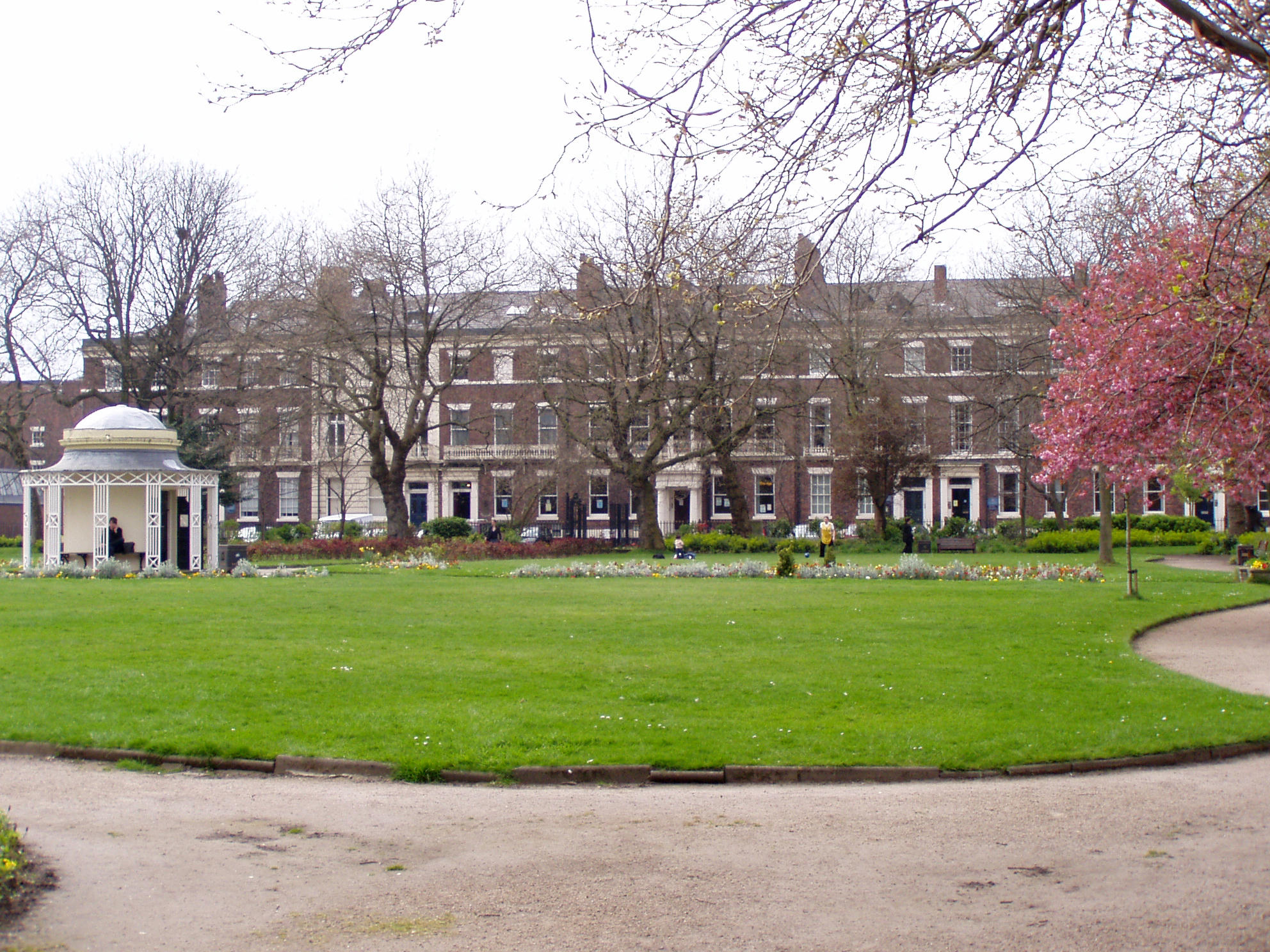
Abercromby Square in Liverpool, where Willox died

After his marriage, Willox had become more involved in public affairs. When Edward Whitley, the Conservative Member of Parliament (MP) for Liverpool Everton died in January 1892, Willox was selected as the Conservative candidate for the resulting by-election.

Everton was a Conservative safe seat, which the party had held since its creation in 1885, and Willox was regarded as a strong candidate. The local Liberal Party therefore decided not to contest the election, and Willox was returned unopposed. In honour of his election, over 100 journalists from Liverpool presented him with an illuminated address.

Willox was re-elected with a large majority at the general election in July 1892, and was returned unopposed in 1895 and 1900. He was knighted in Queen Victoria's Diamond Jubilee Honours in 1897.

== Death ==
Sir John became seriously ill in late 1904. When his wife Sara died, he attended her funeral at Anfield Cemetery on 17 December, but was really too ill to go out, and had to be supported by two stepsons.

He resigned from Parliament in February 1905 by taking the Chiltern Hundreds, triggering another by-election. He died on his 63rd birthday, 16 June 1905, at his home on Abercromby Square, Liverpool.

Parliament of the United Kingdom
Preceded by Edward Whitley	Member of Parliament for Liverpool Everton; 1892–1905	Succeeded by Sir John Harmood-Banner
