= Liverpool Courier =

19th-century English newspaper

- Owner: John A. Willox
- Founded: 6 January 1808
- Ceased publication: 1929

The Liverpool Courier was a 19th-century conservative newspaper that circulated in Liverpool, England. First published in 1808 as a four-page weekly political paper priced at 6d, it was printed and published by Thomas Kaye. In addition to political news, the newspaper provided details on departing ships, cargoes, ship location updates, as well as announcements of births, deaths, and bankruptcies.

Throughout its history, the paper underwent several name changes:

- Liverpool Courier and Commercial Advertiser (1808–1863)
- Daily Courier (1863–1882)
- Liverpool Courier (1882–1922)
- Liverpool Daily Courier (1922)
- Daily Courier (1922–1929)
