= Harold Cope =

English footballer

Personal information
- Full name: Harold Cope
- Date of birth: 9 February 1902
- Place of birth: Rawmarsh, England
- Date of death: 1980 (aged 77–78)
- Position: Goalkeeper

Senior career*
Years	Team	Apps	(Gls)
1919–1920	Parkgate Works		
1920–1921	Rawmarsh Athletic		
1921–1922	Mexborough Town		
1922–1925	Barnsley	32	(0)
1925–1926	Mexborough Athletic		
1926–1930	Blackburn Rovers	25	(0)
1930–1932	Swindon Town	68	(0)
1932–1934	Stalybridge Celtic		
1934	Ollerton Colliery		
Total		125	(0)
- * Club domestic league appearances and goals

Harold Cope (9 February 1902 – 1980) was an English footballer who played in the Football League for Barnsley, Blackburn Rovers and Swindon Town.
