= Peter Cope =

Peter Roland Cope (7 December 1921 – 4 April 2005) was the last surviving test pilot from the Avro Arrow program.

Born in Croydon, England, Cope signed up for the Royal Air Force in 1939 after graduating from Croydon College with a degree in science and applied mathematics.

Due to the over stretched pilot training in the UK in August 1941 Cope was sent for training with the United States Army Air Corps on the Vultee BT-13 Valiant at Maxwell Field, Alabama. Cope returned to England in 1942 and after advanced fighter training joined 170 Squadron flying the North American Mustang.

Cope attended No. 5 Course at the Empire Test Pilots' School in 1946/1947.

He was hired by Armstrong-Whitworth Company to test the Gloster Meteor

In April 1952 Cope moved to Canada to work for A.V.Roe Canada. Because of his experience in the war he became the unofficial armament development pilot.

Cope was one of four pilots assigned to test fly the Arrow, and flew it five times.

In 1960 Cope left Avro for Boeing, from which he retired in 1986.

Cope died in Bellevue, Washington.
