= Crossley Hospital West =

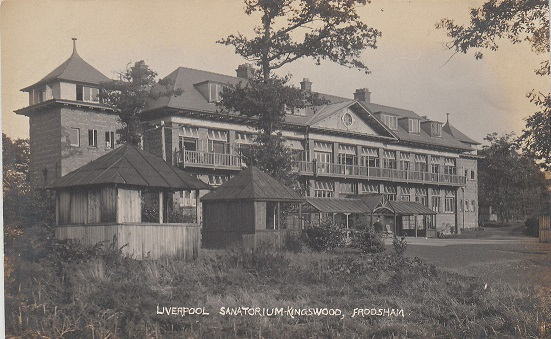
- Crossley Hospital West

- Shown in Cheshire

Geography
- Location: Delamere Forest, Cheshire, England
- Coordinates: 53.256°N 2.709°W

Organisation
- Care system: NHS
- Type: Specialist

Services
- Emergency department: No
- Speciality: Tuberculosis

History
- Founded: 1901
- Closed: 1960s

Links
- Lists: Hospitals in England

Crossley Hospital West, founded in 1905 as the Liverpool Sanatorium, was a tuberculosis sanatorium situated on the outer edge of Delamere Forest in Cheshire. It closed in the 1960s and has since been demolished.

== History ==
The hospital was originally founded in 1863 as a Consumption Hospital. The sanatorium was largely financed by Lady Willox and Sir William Hartley and opened as the Liverpool Sanatorium in 1901. Admission was restricted to residents of Liverpool. It joined the National Health Service as Crossley Hospital West in 1948 and closed in the 1960s. It was subsequently used as a private nursing home before being demolished.

== See also ==
- Listed buildings in Manley, Cheshire
