= George Cope (tobacco manufacturer) =

George Cope (1822–1888) was one of the founding brothers of Cope Bros & Co, a tobacco products manufacturer in Liverpool. He was understood to be the junior partner in the business up until his brother Thomas Cope (1827-1884)'s death in 1884. He was born on 4 September 1822 as Soloman George Cope to John Cope (1791–1884), a music professor originally from Ross On Wye, and Ellen Jones (from Liverpool) He died 1 February 1888, and was buried in Anfield Cemetery on 3 February 1888.

At the time of his death in 1888 he was living in and was the owner of Dove Park in Liverpool (which is now called Reynolds Park, named after the Park’s last private owners). He was a justice of the peace (JP) in the County of Denbigh of north Wales in the last two years before his death, where he had another residence.

His estate was valued at £274,923 at the time of his death, and was the subject of some newspaper articles at the time due to his being one of the richest men in Britain dying that year. Henry Tate of Tate & Lyle was one of the executors of the will. Woolton Convalescent Institution (£5000) and Cope's Benevolent Fund (£10,000) were among the beneficiaries of the will.
