= Sidney Cope =

English cricketer

Personal information
- Full name: Sidney Alfred Cope
- Born: 12 August 1904; Hastings, Sussex
- Died: 14 April 1986 (aged 81); Dartford, Kent
- Batting: Left-handed
- Bowling: Left-arm fast-medium

Domestic team information
- Years: Team
- 1924: Kent

Career statistics
Competition	First-class
Matches	1
Runs scored	0
Batting average	0.00
100s/50s	0/0
Top score	0
Balls bowled	42
Wickets	1
Bowling average	27.00
5 wickets in innings	0
10 wickets in match	0
Best bowling	1/27
Catches/stumpings	0/–
- Source: Cricinfo, 21 August 2012

Sidney Alfred Cope (12 August 1904 – 14 April 1986) was an English professional cricketer.

Cope was born at Hastings in Sussex, the son of Herbert and Eleanor Cope. His father was a railway porter. Cope played for Kent County Cricket Club's Second XI in 1924 and 1925. After impressing with 12 wickets against Bedfordshire in his third match, he was employed at the club's Tonbridge Nursery.

He made one first-class cricket appearance for the county's First XI against Gloucestershire in the 1924 County Championship at Mote Park, Maidstone, taking one wicket. He was Kent's leading Second XI wicket-taker in 1924, with 32, but played only four times the following season and was released from the Nursery at the end of 1925. He was later given a trial at Warwickshire but was considered "temperamentally unsuited to a cricket career" by the county.

Cope died at Dartford in Kent in 1986 aged 81.

== Bibliography ==
- Carlaw, Derek (2020). Kent County Cricketers, A to Z: Part Two (1919–1939) (PDF). Cardiff: ACS.
