= Liverpool Everton =

Parliamentary constituency in the United Kingdom, 1885–1950

- Former borough constituency for the House of Commons
- County: Lancashire
- Major settlements: Everton

1885–1950
- Seats: One
- Created from: Liverpool
- Replaced by: Liverpool Scotland

Liverpool Everton was a borough constituency represented in the House of Commons of the Parliament of the United Kingdom. It elected one Member of Parliament (MP) by the first past the post system of election.

== History ==
The constituency was created by the Redistribution of Seats Act 1885 for the 1885 general election, and abolished for the 1950 general election.

== Boundaries ==
1885–1918: Part of the civil parish of Everton.

1918–1950: The County Borough of Liverpool wards of Everton and Netherfield.

== Members of Parliament ==
Elected	Member	Party
1885	Edward Whitley	Conservative
1892 by-election	Sir John A. Willox	Conservative
1905 by-election	John Harmood-Banner	Conservative
1924	Herbert Charles Woodcock	Conservative
1929	Derwent Hall Caine	Labour
1931	Frank Hornby	Conservative
1935	Bertie Kirby	Labour
1950	constituency abolished	

== Election results ==
=== Elections in the 1880s ===
General election 1885: Liverpool Everton
Party	Candidate	Votes	%	±%
Conservative	Edward Whitley	4,535	68.7	
Liberal	Frederick Davies	2,063	31.3	
Majority		2,472	37.4	
Turnout		6,598	69.9	
Registered electors		9,439		
Conservative win (new seat)				

General election 1886: Liverpool Everton
Party	Candidate	Votes	%	±%
Conservative	Edward Whitley	Unopposed		
Conservative hold				

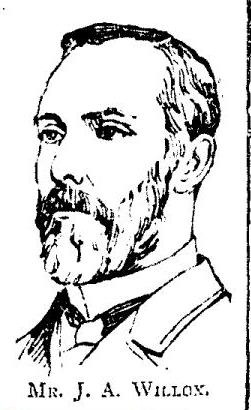

=== Elections in the 1890s ===
By-election 15 Feb 1892: Liverpool Everton
Party	Candidate	Votes	%	±%
Conservative	John A. Willox	Unopposed		
Conservative hold				

- Caused by Whitley's death.

General election 1892: Liverpool Everton
Party	Candidate	Votes	%	±%
Conservative	John A. Willox	3,954	64.6	N/A
Liberal	Peter Wilson Atkin	2,165	35.4	New
Majority		1,789	29.2	N/A
Turnout		6,199	66.7	N/A
Registered electors		9,179		
Conservative hold		Swing	N/A	

General election 1895: Liverpool Everton
Party	Candidate	Votes	%	±%
Conservative	John A. Willox	Unopposed		
Conservative hold				

=== Elections in the 1900s ===
General election 1900: Liverpool Everton
Party	Candidate	Votes	%	±%
Conservative	John A. Willox	Unopposed		
Conservative hold				

1905 Liverpool Everton by-election
Party	Candidate	Votes	%	±%
Conservative	John Harmood-Banner	3,854	60.2	N/A
Liberal	William Hanbury Aggs	2,543	39.8	New
Majority		1,311	20.4	N/A
Turnout		6,397	63.4	N/A
Registered electors		10,096		
Conservative hold		Swing	N/A	

General election 1906: Liverpool Everton
Party	Candidate	Votes	%	±%
Conservative	John Harmood-Banner	3,949	57.8	N/A
Liberal	William Hanbury Aggs	2,884	42.2	N/A
Majority		1,065	15.6	N/A
Turnout		6,833	67.3	N/A
Registered electors		10,149		
Conservative hold		Swing	N/A	

=== Elections in the 1910s ===
General election January 1910: Liverpool Everton
Party	Candidate	Votes	%	±%
Conservative	John Harmood-Banner	4,283	62.4	+4.6
Liberal	William Hanbury Aggs	2,577	37.6	−4.6
Majority		1,706	24.8	+9.2
Turnout		6,860	73.7	+6.4
Conservative hold		Swing	+4.6	

General election December 1910: Liverpool Everton
Party	Candidate	Votes	%	±%
Conservative	John Harmood-Banner	Unopposed		
Conservative hold				

General Election 1914–15:

Another General Election was required to take place before the end of 1915. The political parties had been making preparations for an election to take place and by July 1914, the following candidates had been selected;

- Unionist: John Harmood-Banner
- Liberal:

General election 1918: Liverpool Everton
Party		Candidate	Votes	%	±%
C	Unionist	John Harmood-Banner	6,370	52.4	N/A
	NFDDSS	Arthur W Brooksbank	5,779	47.6	New
Majority			591	4.8	N/A
Turnout			12,149	47.4	N/A
	Unionist hold		Swing	N/A	
C indicates candidate endorsed by the coalition government.

=== Elections in the 1920s ===
General election 1922: Liverpool Everton
Party	Candidate	Votes	%	±%
Unionist	John Harmood-Banner	11,667	60.6	+8.2
Labour	Joseph Toole	7,600	39.4	New
Majority		4,067	21.2	+16.4
Turnout		19,267	70.3	+13.9
Unionist hold		Swing		

General election 1923: Liverpool Everton
Party	Candidate	Votes	%	±%
Unionist	John Harmood-Banner	9,183	54.5	−6.1
Labour	Henry Walker	7,673	45.5	+6.1
Majority		1,510	9.0	−12.2
Turnout		16,856	59.8	−10.5
Unionist hold		Swing	-6.1	

General election 1924: Liverpool Everton
Party	Candidate	Votes	%	±%
Unionist	Herbert Charles Woodcock	10,705	51.5	−3.0
Labour	Henry Walker	10,075	48.5	+3.0
Majority		630	3.0	−6.0
Turnout		20,780	72.3	+12.5
Unionist hold		Swing	-3.0	

General election 1929: Liverpool Everton
Party	Candidate	Votes	%	±%
Labour	Derwent Hall Caine	14,234	52.9	+4.4
Unionist	Margaret Beavan	12,667	47.1	−4.4
Majority		1,567	5.8	N/A
Turnout		26,901	75.9	+3.6
Labour gain from Unionist		Swing	+4.4	

=== Elections in the 1930s ===
General election 1931: Liverpool Everton
Party	Candidate	Votes	%	±%
Conservative	Frank Hornby	12,186	48.9	+1.8
Labour	Samuel Lewis Treleaven	7,786	31.2	−21.7
National Labour	Derwent Hall Caine	4,950	19.9	New
Majority		4,400	17.7	N/A
Turnout		24,922	71.3	−4.6
Conservative gain from Labour		Swing	+11.7	

General election 1935: Liverpool Everton
Party	Candidate	Votes	%	±%
Labour	Bertie Kirby	10,962	50.4	+19.2
Conservative	Ralph Etherton	10,785	49.6	+0.7
Majority		177	0.8	N/A
Turnout		21,747	67.4	―3.9
Labour gain from Conservative		Swing	+9.2	

General Election 1939–40

Another General Election was required to take place before the end of 1940. The political parties had been making preparations for an election to take place and by the Autumn of 1939, the following candidates had been selected;

- Labour: Bertie Kirby
- Conservative:

=== Elections in the 1940s ===
General election 1945: Liverpool Everton
Party	Candidate	Votes	%	±%
Labour	Bertie Kirby	9,088	65.4	+15.0
Conservative	HW Hill	4,806	34.6	―15.0
Majority		4,282	30.8	+30.0
Turnout		13,894	62.9	―4.5
Labour hold		Swing	+15.0	
