= John Harmood-Banner =

British politician

Sir John Sutherland Harmood-Banner, 1st Baronet (8 September 1847 – 24 February 1927) was an English accountant from Liverpool. His interests spread across Lancashire and Cheshire, and extended to the British colonies and South America.

He was also prominent in the civic affairs of Liverpool, where he was a long-serving City Councillor. A Conservative, he was Lord Mayor of Liverpool, and was one of the city's Members of Parliament (MPs) for nearly 20 years.

== Early life ==
Harmood-Banner was born in Toxteth Park, Liverpool, the second son of accountant Harmood Walter Banner from Bebington in Cheshire. He was educated at Radley College.

== Career ==
He entered the family accountancy firm of Harmood Banner & Son in Liverpool, becoming a partner in 1870. In 1883 he assumed the position of deputy chairman of Pearson and Knowles, a coal and iron conglomerate based in Warrington. For the next 20 years he specialised in accounting work acting as a financial advisor and auditor of a number of major companies.

He was elected MP for Liverpool Everton in a by-election in 1905, sitting until 1924. He was a justice of the peace and deputy lieutenant for Cheshire and was appointed High Sheriff of Cheshire for 1902. He also served as Lord Mayor of the City of Liverpool for 1912, was knighted in July 1913 and created a baronet in 1924.

In later life he served on the boards of a number of companies and on several government committees. He retired in 1925 and died on 24 February 1927 at his home, Ingmire Hall, in Sedbergh, Yorkshire. He was buried in Toxteth Park Cemetery in Liverpool.

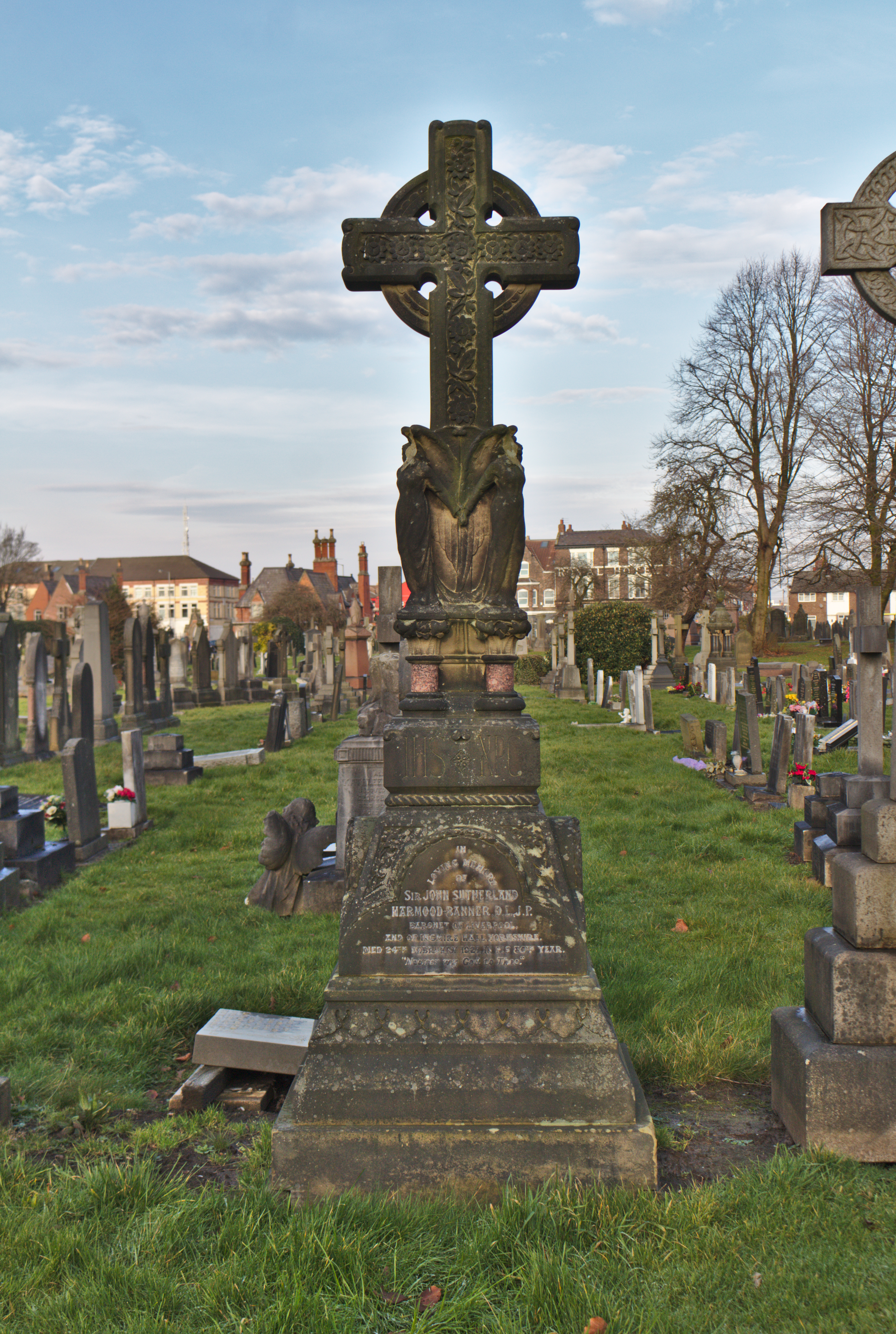
Gravestone in Toxteth Park Cemetery

== Private life ==
He married twice, firstly Elizabeth, the daughter and coheir of Thomas Knowles, MP of Wigan, with whom he had four sons and two daughters and secondly in 1908 the widow Ella Wilstone, daughter of John Ernest Herbert Linford of Thorpe, Norfolk. He was succeeded by his son Harmood Harmood-Banner.

Parliament of the United Kingdom
Preceded by Edward Whitley	Member of Parliament for Liverpool Everton; 1905–1924	Succeeded by Herbert Charles Woodcock
Baronetage of the United Kingdom
New creation	Baronet (of Liverpool); 1924–1927	Succeeded by Harmood Harmood-Banner
