= Thomas D. Cope =

Thomas Darlington Cope (December 28, 1880 – December 13, 1964) was an American physicist and historian of science who published numerous articles concerning the Mason–Dixon survey in America, providing the most thorough record of the scientific accomplishments and historical importance of the survey.

From 1939 to 1956, Cope published more than 20 articles on the scientific and boundary survey work of Charles Mason and Jeremiah Dixon in America, Africa, and Europe. His work appeared in Pennsylvania History, Proceedings of the Pennsylvania Academy of Science, Scientific Monthly, Nature, Sky and Telescope, Proceedings of the American Philosophical Society, and Notes and Records of the Royal Society of London.

Cope tends to focus on the scientific importance of the Mason–Dixon survey as an accomplishment of Enlightenment ingenuity applied to a geographically and politically difficult problem. Cope’s research is thought to serve as a significant source for the historical basis of Thomas Pynchon’s novel Mason & Dixon.

Cope served as Professor of Physics at the University of Pennsylvania from 1902 to 1952. He earned his A.B. (1903) and Ph.D. (1915) from the University of Pennsylvania and studied at the University of Berlin in 1912-13 under Max Planck. His collected notes, held at the library of the American Philosophical Society in Philadelphia, also include notes on lectures of relativity (1921) by Albert Einstein.
