= Thomas Cope (manufacturer) =

British businessman (1827–1884)

Thomas Cope (2 February 1827 – 18 September 1884) founded and operated a tobacco products manufacturing company in Liverpool from 1848, along with his brother, George Cope. This company was Cope Bros & Co.

== Life ==
Thomas Cope was born to John Cope (1791–1884), a music professor originally from Ross On Wye, and Ellen Jones from Liverpool.

At the time of his death he was chairman of the Convalescent Home at Woolton, and the Consumptive Hospital in Mount Pleasant, Liverpool until his death and was one of the main benefactors.

He was a member of the Senate of University College Liverpool, which later became Liverpool University. G. H. Kendal, who was Principal of University College Liverpool at the time of Cope's death, stated in a letter to the Liverpool Mercury that Thomas Cope had been “instrumental” in raising the fund for the Chemical Laboratories, to which he contributed the initial £600.

From 1881 he served as Justice of the Peace in Liverpool. and was the founding member and the first speaker of the Liverpool Parliamentary Debating Society.

By 1876, 1500 of the 2000 workers at the company's factory in Lord Nelson Street, Liverpool, were women. The company was praised for its working conditions for women by Charles Dickens and Emily Faithful.

Died on 18 September 1884 and was buried in Anfield Cemetery on 23 September 1884. Among the mourners were John Hignett of Hignett's Tobacco Company, Henry Tate of Tate & Lyle, and John Archibald Willox. The Liverpool Mercury newspaper reported up to 3000 people assembled by the graveside.

At the time of his death he was a director at the Liverpool Gas Company and also chairman of Richmond Cavendish, another tobacco products company based in Liverpool.

== Innovation ==
Thomas Cope and his brother, George, applied for a patent in the United States for tobacco pressing equipment.
