= 1905 Liverpool Everton by-election =

UK Parliamentary by-election

The 1905 Liverpool Everton by-election was held on 22 February 1905 after the resignation due to ill health of the incumbent Conservative MP Sir John Archibald Willox. It was retained by the Conservative candidate John Harmood-Banner.

Liverpool Everton by-election, 1905
Party	Candidate	Votes	%	±%
Conservative	John Harmood-Banner	3,854	60.2	N/A
Liberal	William Hanbury Aggs	2,543	39.8	New
Majority		1,311	20.4	N/A
Turnout		6,397	63.4	N/A
Conservative hold		Swing	N/A	
