= List of MPs elected in the 1931 United Kingdom general election =

1931–1935 Parliament of the United Kingdom
←	1929–1931 Parliament	1935–1945 Parliament	→
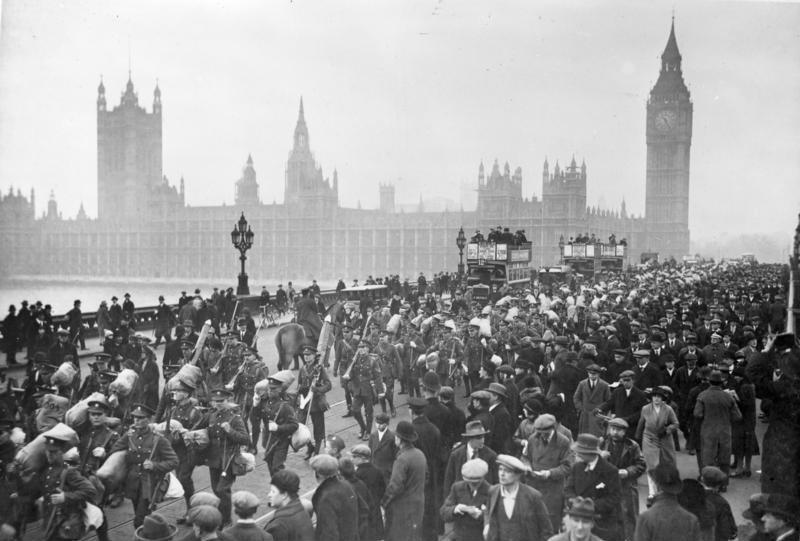
- Palace of Westminster in 1932

Overview
- Legislative body: Parliament of the United Kingdom
- Term: 27 October 1931 – 14 November 1935
- Election: 1931 United Kingdom general election
- Government: National Government II

House of Commons
- Members: 615
- Speaker: Edward FitzRoy
- Leader: Ramsay MacDonald
- Prime Minister: Ramsay MacDonald
- Leader of the Opposition: Arthur Henderson; George Lansbury
- Third-party leader: Sir Herbert Samuel

House of Lords
- Lord Chancellor: John Sankey, 1st Baron Sankey

Crown-in-Parliament George V

Sessions
- 1st: 3 November 1931 – 17 November 1932
- 2nd: 22 November 1932 – 17 November 1933
- 3rd: 21 November 1933 – 16 November 1934
- 4th: 16 November 1934 – 25 October 1935

This is a complete list of members of Parliament elected at the 1931 general election, held on 27 October.

== Composition ==
These representative diagrams show the composition of the parties in the 1931 general election. First, immediately after the election.

Affiliation	Members
Conservative Party	470
Labour Party	49
Liberal National	35
Liberal	32
National Labour	13
National	4
Independent Liberal	4
Nationalist	2
Ind. Labour Party	3
Independent	3

Second, at the end of 1933, after the Liberal Party withdrew from the National Government.

Affiliation	Members
Conservative Party	467
Labour Party	52
Liberal	36
Liberal National	35
National Labour	13
National	4
Nationalist	2
Ind. Labour Party	3
Independent	3

== A ==
Constituency	MP	Party
Aberavon	William Cove	Labour
Aberdare	George Hall	Labour
Aberdeen North	John George Burnett	Conservative
Aberdeen South	Sir Frederick Thomson, Bt	Conservative
Aberdeenshire Central	Robert Smith	Conservative
Aberdeenshire East	Robert Boothby	Conservative
Aberdeenshire West and Kincardine	Malcolm Barclay-Harvey	Conservative
Abertillery	George Daggar	Labour
Abingdon	Ralph Glyn	Conservative
Accrington	Henry Procter	Conservative
Acton	Hubert Duggan	Conservative
Aldershot	Roundell Palmer	Conservative
Altrincham	Cyril Atkinson	Conservative
Anglesey	Megan Lloyd George	Independent Liberal
Antrim (Two members)	Hon. Sir Hugh O'Neill	Ulster Unionist
Antrim (Two members)	Sir Joseph McConnell, Bt	Ulster Unionist
Argyllshire	Frederick Macquisten	Conservative
Armagh	Sir William Allen	Ulster Unionist
Ashford	Hon. Michael Knatchbull	Conservative
Ashton-under-Lyne	John Broadbent	Conservative
Aylesbury	Michael Beaumont	Conservative
Ayr Burghs	Thomas Moore	Conservative
Ayrshire North and Bute	Sir Aylmer Hunter-Weston	Conservative
Ayrshire South	James MacAndrew	Conservative
== B ==
Balham and Tooting	Sir Alfred Butt, Bt	Conservative
Banbury	Albert Edmondson	Conservative
Banffshire	Sir Murdoch McKenzie Wood	Liberal
Barkston Ash	Leonard Ropner	Conservative
Barnard Castle	Cuthbert Headlam	Conservative
Barnsley	Richard John Soper	Liberal National
Barnstaple	Sir Basil Peto, Bt	Conservative
Barrow-in-Furness	Sir Jonah Walker-Smith	Conservative
Basingstoke	Viscount Lymington	Conservative
Bassetlaw	Malcolm MacDonald	National Labour
Bath	Loel Guinness	Conservative
Batley and Morley	Wilfrid Wills	Conservative
Battersea North	Arthur Marsden	Conservative
Battersea South	Harry Selley	Conservative
Bedford	Richard Wells	Conservative
Bedfordshire Mid	Alan Lennox-Boyd	Conservative
Bedwellty	Charles Edwards	Labour
Belfast, East	Herbert Dixon	Ulster Unionist
Belfast, North	Thomas Somerset	Ulster Unionist
Belfast, South	William Stewart	Ulster Unionist
Belfast, West	Alexander Browne	Ulster Unionist
Belper	Herbert Wragg	Conservative
Bermondsey West	Alfred Salter	Labour
Berwick-on-Tweed	Alfred Todd	Conservative
Berwick and Haddington	John McEwen	Conservative
Bethnal Green North-East	Harry Nathan	Liberal
Bethnal Green South-West	Percy Harris	Liberal
Bewdley	Rt Hon. Stanley Baldwin	Conservative
Birkenhead East	Graham White	Liberal
Birkenhead West	John Sandeman Allen	Conservative
Birmingham Aston	Arthur Hope	Conservative
Birmingham Deritend	Smedley Crooke	Conservative
Birmingham Duddeston	Oliver Simmonds	Conservative
Birmingham Edgbaston	Rt Hon. Neville Chamberlain	Conservative
Birmingham Erdington	John Eales	Conservative
Birmingham Handsworth	Oliver Locker-Lampson	Conservative
Birmingham King's Norton	Lionel Beaumont-Thomas	Conservative
Birmingham Ladywood	Geoffrey Lloyd	Conservative
Birmingham Moseley	Patrick Hannon	Conservative
Birmingham Sparkbrook	Rt Hon. Leo Amery	Conservative
Birmingham West	Rt Hon. Sir Austen Chamberlain	Conservative
Birmingham Yardley	Edward Salt	Conservative
Bishop Auckland	Aaron Curry	Liberal National
Blackburn (Two members)	Sir W. D. Smiles	Conservative
Blackburn (Two members)	George Elliston	Conservative
Blackpool	Clifford Erskine-Bolst	Conservative
Blaydon	Thomas Martin	Conservative
Bodmin	Isaac Foot	Liberal
Bolton (Two members)	Cyril Entwistle	Conservative
Bolton (Two members)	Sir John Haslam	Conservative
Bootle	Chichester Crookshank	Conservative
Bosworth	William Edge	Liberal National
Bothwell	Helen Shaw	Conservative
Bournemouth	Sir Henry Page Croft	Conservative
Bow and Bromley	Rt Hon. George Lansbury	Labour
Bradford Central	George Eady	Conservative
Bradford East	Joseph Hepworth	Conservative
Bradford North	Sir Eugene Ramsden	Conservative
Bradford South	Herbert Holdsworth	Liberal
Brecon and Radnor	Walter Hall	Conservative
Brentford and Chiswick	Harold Mitchell	Conservative
Bridgwater	Reginald Croom-Johnson	Conservative
Brigg	Michael Hunter	Conservative
Brighton (Two members)	Sir Cooper Rawson	Conservative
Brighton (Two members)	Rt Hon. Sir George Tryon	Conservative
Bristol Central	Lord Apsley	Conservative
Bristol East	Sir Stafford Cripps	Labour
Bristol North	Robert Bernays	Liberal
Bristol South	Noel Ker-Lindsay	Conservative
Bristol West	Cyril Thomas Culverwell	Conservative
Brixton	Nigel Colman	Conservative
Bromley	Sir Edward Campbell	Conservative
Broxtowe	Seymour Cocks	Labour
Buckingham	Sir George Bowyer	Conservative
Buckrose	Albert Braithwaite	Conservative
Burnley	Gordon Campbell	National
Burslem	William Allen	National
Burton	Rt Hon. John Gretton	Conservative
Bury	Charles Ainsworth	Conservative
Bury St. Edmunds	Frank Heilgers	Conservative
== C ==
Caerphilly	Morgan Jones	Labour
Caithness and Sutherland	Rt Hon. Sir Archibald Sinclair, Bt	Liberal
Camberwell North	Arthur Bateman	Conservative
Camberwell North West	James Cassels	Conservative
Camborne	Peter Agnew	Conservative
Cambridge	Sir George Newton	Conservative
Cambridge University (Two members)	Sir John Withers	Conservative
Cambridge University (Two members)	Godfrey Wilson	Conservative
Cambridgeshire	Richard Briscoe	Conservative
Cannock	Sarah Ward	Conservative
Canterbury	Sir William Wayland	Conservative
Cardiff Central	Sir Ernest Bennett	National Labour
Cardiff East	Owen Temple-Morris	Conservative
Cardiff South	Arthur Evans	Conservative
Cardiganshire	Rhys Hopkin Morris	Liberal
Carlisle	Louis Spears	Conservative
Carmarthen	Richard Thomas Evans	Liberal
Carnarvon Boroughs	Rt Hon. David Lloyd George	Independent Liberal
Carnarvonshire	Goronwy Owen	Independent Liberal
Chatham	Park Goff	Conservative
Chelmsford	Sir Vivian Henderson	Conservative
Chelsea	Rt Hon. Sir Samuel Hoare, Bt	Conservative
Cheltenham	Sir Walter Preston	Conservative
Chertsey	Sir Archibald Boyd-Carpenter	Conservative
City of Chester	Sir Charles Cayzer, Bt	Conservative
Chesterfield	Roger Conant	Conservative
Chester-le-Street	Jack Lawson	Labour
Chichester	John Courtauld	Conservative
Chippenham	Victor Cazalet	Conservative
Chislehurst	Waldron Smithers	Conservative
Chorley	Rt Hon. Douglas Hacking	Conservative
Cirencester and Tewkesbury	William Morrison	Conservative
City of London (Two members)	Sir Vansittart Bowater, Bt	Conservative
City of London (Two members)	Edward Grenfell	Conservative
Clapham	Sir John Leigh, Bt	Conservative
Clay Cross	Charles Duncan	Labour
Cleveland	Robert Bower	Conservative
Clitheroe	Sir William Brass	Conservative
Coatbridge	William Templeton	Conservative
Colchester	Oswald Lewis	Conservative
Colne Valley	Lance Mallalieu	Liberal
Combined English Universities (Two members)	Eleanor Rathbone	Independent
Combined English Universities (Two members)	Sir Reginald Craddock	Conservative
Combined Scottish Universities (Three members)	Dugald Cowan	Liberal
Combined Scottish Universities (Three members)	John Buchan	Conservative
Combined Scottish Universities (Three members)	Noel Skelton	Conservative
Consett	John Dickie	Liberal National
Cornwall North	Rt Hon. Sir Donald Maclean	Liberal
Coventry	William Strickland	Conservative
Crewe	Sir Donald Somervell	Conservative
Croydon North	Glyn Mason	Conservative
Croydon South	William Mitchell-Thomson	Conservative
Cumberland North	Fergus Graham	Conservative
== D ==
Darlington	Charles Peat	Conservative
Dartford	Frank Clarke	Conservative
Darwen	Rt Hon. Sir Herbert Samuel	Liberal
Daventry	Rt Hon. Edward FitzRoy	Speaker (Conservative)
Denbigh	Henry Morris-Jones	Liberal National
Deptford	Denis Hanley	Conservative
Derby (Two members)	Rt Hon. J. H. Thomas	National Labour
Derby (Two members)	William Allan Reid	Conservative
Derbyshire North East	Jardine Whyte	Conservative
Derbyshire South	Paul Emrys-Evans	Conservative
Derbyshire West	The Marquess of Hartington	Conservative
Devizes	Sir Percy Hurd	Conservative
Dewsbury	Walter Rea	Liberal
Doncaster	Hugh Molson	Conservative
Don Valley	Tom Williams	Labour
Dorset East	Gordon Hall Caine	Conservative
Dorset North	Cecil Hanbury	Conservative
Dorset, South	Viscount Cranborne	Conservative
Dorset West	Philip Colfox	Conservative
Dover	Hon. John Astor	Conservative
Down (Two members)	David Reid	Ulster Unionist
Down (Two members)	Viscount Castlereagh	Ulster Unionist
Dudley	Dudley Joel	Conservative
Dulwich	Sir Frederick Hall, Bt	Conservative
Dumbarton Burghs	David Kirkwood	Independent Labour
Dumfriesshire	Joseph Hunter	Liberal
Dunbartonshire	John Thom	Conservative
Dundee (Two members)	Dingle Foot	Liberal
Dundee (Two members)	Florence Horsbrugh	Conservative
Dunfermline Burghs	John Wallace	Liberal National
Durham	William McKeag	Liberal
== E ==
Ealing	Sir Frank Sanderson, Bt	Conservative
Eastbourne	Edward Marjoribanks	Conservative
East Grinstead	Sir Henry Cautley, Bt	Conservative
East Ham North	John Mayhew	Conservative
East Ham South	Malcolm Campbell-Johnston	Conservative
Ebbw Vale	Aneurin Bevan	Labour
Eccles	John Potter	Conservative
Eddisbury	R. J. Russell	Liberal National
Edinburgh Central	James Guy	Conservative
Edinburgh East	David Marshall Mason	Liberal
Edinburgh North	Sir Patrick Ford, Bt	Conservative
Edinburgh South	Sir Samuel Chapman	Conservative
Edinburgh West	Wilfid Normand	Conservative
Edmonton	John Rutherford	Conservative
Elland	Thomas Levy	Conservative
Enfield	Reginald Applin	Conservative
Epping	Rt Hon. Winston Churchill	Conservative
Epsom	Archibald Southby	Conservative
Essex South East	Victor Raikes	Conservative
Evesham	Rt Hon. Sir Bolton Eyres-Monsell	Conservative
Exeter	Arthur Reed	Conservative
Eye	Edgar Granville	Liberal National
== F ==
Fareham	Sir Thomas Inskip	Conservative
Farnham	Sir Arthur Samuel	Conservative
Farnworth	James Stones	Conservative
Faversham	Adam Maitland	Conservative
Fermanagh and Tyrone (Two members)	Joseph Devlin	Irish Nationalist
Fermanagh and Tyrone (Two members)	Cahir Healy	Irish Nationalist
Fife East	Sir James Duncan Millar	Liberal National
Fife West	Charles Milne	Conservative
Finchley	Hon. Edward Cadogan	Conservative
Finsbury	Sir George Gillett	National Labour
Flintshire	Frederick Llewellyn-Jones	Liberal National
Forest of Dean	John Worthington	National Labour
Forfarshire	William T. Shaw	Conservative
Frome	Henry Thynne	Conservative
Fulham East	Sir Kenyon Vaughan-Morgan	Conservative
Fulham West	Sir Cyril Cobb	Conservative
Fylde	Edward Stanley	Conservative
== G ==
Gainsborough	Harry Crookshank	Conservative
Galloway	John Mackie	Conservative
Gateshead	Thomas Magnay	Liberal National
Gillingham	Sir Robert Gower	Conservative
Glasgow Bridgeton	James Maxton	Independent Labour Party
Glasgow Camlachie	James Stevenson	Conservative
Glasgow Cathcart	John Train	Conservative
Glasgow Central	Sir William Alexander	Conservative
Glasgow Gorbals	George Buchanan	Independent Labour
Glasgow Govan	Neil Maclean	Labour
Glasgow Hillhead	Rt Hon. Sir Robert Horne	Conservative
Glasgow Kelvingrove	Walter Elliott	Conservative
Glasgow Maryhill	Douglas Jamieson	Conservative
Glasgow Partick	Charles MacAndrew	Conservative
Glasgow Pollok	Rt Hon. Sir John Gilmour, Bt	Conservative
Glasgow St. Rollox	William Leonard	Labour Co-op
Glasgow Shettleston	John McGovern	Independent Labour Party
Glasgow Springburn	Charles Emmott	Conservative
Glasgow Tradeston	William McLean	Conservative
Gloucester	Leslie Boyce	Conservative
Gower	David Grenfell	Labour
Grantham	Sir Victor Warrender, Bt	Conservative
Gravesend	Irving Albery	Conservative
Great Yarmouth	Arthur Harbord	Liberal National
Greenock	Sir Godfrey Collins	Liberal National
Greenwich	Sir George Hume	Conservative
Grimsby	Walter Womersley	Conservative
Guildford	Hon. Charles Rhys	Conservative
== H ==
Hackney Central	John Lockwood	Conservative
Hackney North	Austin Hudson	Conservative
Hackney South	Marjorie Graves	Conservative
Halifax	Gilbert Gledhill	Conservative
Hamilton	Duncan Graham	Labour
Hammersmith North	Mary Pickford	Conservative
Hammersmith South	Douglas Cooke	Conservative
Hampstead	George Balfour	Conservative
Hanley	Harold Hales	Conservative
Harborough	Arthur Stuart	Conservative
Harrow	Sir Isidore Salmon	Conservative
The Hartlepools	W. G. Howard Gritten	Conservative
Harwich	Percy Pybus	Liberal National
Hastings	Rt Hon. Eustace Percy	Conservative
Hemel Hempstead	Rt Hon. J. C. C. Davidson	Conservative
Hemsworth	Gabriel Price	Labour
Hendon	Rt Hon. Sir Philip Cunliffe-Lister	Conservative
Henley	Robert Henderson	Conservative
Hereford	James Thomas	Conservative
Hertford	Murray Sueter	Conservative
Hexham	Douglas Clifton Brown	Conservative
Heywood and Radcliffe	Joseph Cooksey Jackson	Conservative
High Peak	Sir Alfred Law	Conservative
Hitchin	Viscount Knebworth	Conservative
Holborn	Stuart Bevan	Conservative
Holderness	Samuel Savery	Conservative
Holland-with-Boston	James Blindell	Liberal National
Honiton	Cedric Drewe	Conservative
Horncastle	Henry Haslam	Conservative
Hornsey	Euan Wallace	Conservative
Horsham and Worthing	The Earl Winterton PC	Conservative
Houghton-le-Spring	Robert Chapman	Conservative
Howdenshire	William Carver	Conservative
Huddersfield	William Mabane	Liberal National
Huntingdonshire	Sidney Peters	Liberal National
Hythe	Rt Hon. Sir Philip Sassoon, Bt	Conservative
== I ==
Ilford	Sir George Hamilton	Conservative
Ilkeston	Abraham Flint	National Labour
Ince	Gordon Macdonald	Labour
Inverness	Sir Murdo Macdonald	Liberal National
Ipswich	Sir John Ganzoni, Bt	Conservative
Isle of Ely	James de Rothschild	Liberal
Isle of Thanet	Harold Balfour	Conservative
Isle of Wight	Peter Macdonald	Conservative
Islington East	Thelma Cazalet	Conservative
Islington North	Albert Goodman	Conservative
Islington South	Tom Howard	Conservative
Islington West	Patrick Donner	Conservative
== J ==
Jarrow	William Pearson	Conservative
== K ==
Keighley	George Harvie-Watt	Conservative
Kennington	George Harvey	Conservative
Kensington North	James Duncan	Conservative
Kensington South	Sir William Davison	Conservative
Kettering	John Eastwood	Conservative
Kidderminster	Sir John Wardlaw-Milne	Conservative
Kilmarnock	Rt Hon. Craigie Aitchison	National Labour
King's Lynn	The Lord Fermoy	Conservative
Kingston upon Hull Central	Basil Barton	Conservative
Kingston upon Hull East	John Nation	Conservative
Kingston upon Hull North West	Sir Lambert Ward, Bt	Conservative
Kingston upon Hull South West	Richard Law	Conservative
Kingston-upon-Thames	Sir Frederick Penny	Conservative
Kingswinford	Alan Todd	Conservative
Kinross & West Perthshire	The Duchess of Atholl	Conservative
Kirkcaldy District of Burghs	Albert Russell	Conservative
Knutsford	Ernest Makins	Conservative
== L ==
Lambeth North	Frank Briant	Liberal
Lanark	Alec Douglas-Home	Conservative
Lanarkshire North	William Anstruther-Gray	Conservative
Lancaster	Herwald Ramsbotham	Conservative
Leeds Central	Richard Denman	National Labour
Leeds North	Osbert Peake	Conservative
Leeds North East	Sir John Birchall	Conservative
Leeds South	Noel Whiteside	Conservative
Leeds South East	James Milner	Labour
Leeds West	Vyvyan Adams	Conservative
Leek	Arthur Ratcliffe	Conservative
Leicester East	Abraham Lyons	Conservative
Leicester South	Charles Waterhouse	Conservative
Leicester West	Ernest Pickering	Liberal
Leigh	Joe Tinker	Labour
Leith	Ernest Brown	Liberal National
Leominster	Ernest Shepperson	Conservative
Lewes	John Loder	Conservative
Lewisham East	Sir Assheton Pownall	Conservative
Lewisham West	Sir Philip Dawson	Conservative
Leyton East	Sir Frederick Mills, Bt	Conservative
Leyton West	Sir Wilfrid Sugden	Conservative
Lichfield	James Lovat-Fraser	National Labour
Lincoln	Walter Liddall	Conservative
Linlithgowshire	Sir Adrian Baillie, Bt	Conservative
Liverpool East Toxteth	Patrick Buchan-Hepburn	Conservative
Liverpool Edge Hill	Sir Hugo Rutherford, Bt	Conservative
Liverpool Everton	Frank Hornby	Conservative
Liverpool Exchange	Sir James Reynolds, Bt	Conservative
Liverpool Fairfield	Edmund Brocklebank	Conservative
Liverpool Kirkdale	Robert Rankin	Conservative
Liverpool Scotland	David Logan	Labour
Liverpool Walton	Reginald Purbrick	Conservative
Liverpool Wavertree	Ronald Nall-Cain	Conservative
Liverpool West Derby	Sir John Sandeman Allen	Conservative
Liverpool West Toxteth	Clyde Wilson	Conservative
Llandaff and Barry	Patrick Munro	Conservative
Llanelli	John Henry Williams	Labour
London University	Sir Ernest Graham-Little	National Independent
Londonderry	Ronald Ross	Ulster Unionist
Lonsdale	Lord Balniel	Conservative
Loughborough	Lawrence Kimball	Conservative
Louth	Arthur Heneage	Conservative
Lowestoft	Sir Gervais Rentoul	Conservative
Ludlow	George Windsor-Clive	Conservative
Luton	Leslie Burgin	Liberal National
== M ==
Macclesfield	John Remer	Conservative
Maidstone	Alfred Bossom	Conservative
Maldon	Edward Ruggles-Brise	Conservative
Manchester Ardwick	Albert Fuller	Conservative
Manchester Blackley	John Lees-Jones	Conservative
Manchester Clayton	William Flanagan	Conservative
Manchester Exchange	Edward Fielden	Conservative
Manchester Gorton	Eric Bailey	Conservative
Manchester Hulme	Joseph Nall	Conservative
Manchester Moss Side	Sir Gerald Hurst	Conservative
Manchester Platting	Alan Chorlton	Conservative
Manchester Rusholme	Sir Frank Merriman	Conservative
Manchester Withington	Edward Fleming	Conservative
Mansfield	Charles Brown	Labour
Melton	Lindsay Everard	Conservative
Merioneth	Henry Haydn Jones	Liberal
Merthyr	R. C. Wallhead	Independent Labour Party
Middlesbrough East	Ernest Young	Liberal
Middlesbrough West	F. Kingsley Griffith	Liberal
Middleton and Prestwich	Sir Nairne Stewart Sandeman, Bt	Conservative
Midlothian North	John Colville	Conservative
Midlothian South and Peebles	Archibald Maule Ramsay	Conservative
Mitcham	Sir Richard Meller	Conservative
Monmouth	Sir Leolin Forestier-Walker, Bt	Conservative
Montgomery	Clement Davies	Liberal National
Montrose Burghs	Sir Robert Hutchison	Liberal National
Moray & Nairn	Hon. James Stuart	Conservative
Morpeth	Godfrey Nicholson	Conservative
Mossley	Austin Hopkinson	National Independent
Motherwell	Thomas Ormiston	Conservative
== N ==
Neath	Sir William Jenkins	Labour
Nelson and Colne	Linton Thorp	Conservative
Newark	The Marquess of Titchfield	Conservative
Newbury	Howard Clifton Brown	Conservative
Newcastle-under-Lyme	Rt Hon. Josiah Wedgwood	Independent Labour
Newcastle-upon-Tyne Central	Alfred Denville	Conservative
Newcastle-upon-Tyne East	Sir Robert Aske, Bt	Liberal National
Newcastle-upon-Tyne North	Sir Nicholas Grattan-Doyle	Conservative
Newcastle-upon-Tyne West	Joseph Leech	Conservative
New Forest and Christchurch	Rt Hon. Wilfrid Ashley	Conservative
Newport	Reginald Clarry	Conservative
Newton	Reginald Essenhigh	Conservative
Norfolk East	Viscount Elmley	Liberal National
Norfolk North	Thomas Cook	Conservative
Norfolk South	James Christie	Conservative
Norfolk South West	Sir Alan McLean	Conservative
Normanton	Frederick Hall	Labour
Northampton	Sir Mervyn Manningham-Buller, Bt	Conservative
Northwich	Lord Colum Crichton-Stuart	Conservative
Norwich (Two members)	Geoffrey Shakespeare	Liberal National
Norwich (Two members)	George Hartland	Conservative
Norwood	Sir Walter Greaves-Lord	Conservative
Nottingham Central	Terence O'Connor	Conservative
Nottingham East	Louis Gluckstein	Conservative
Nottingham South	Holford Knight	National Labour
Nottingham West	Cecil Caporn	Conservative
Nuneaton	Edward North	Conservative
== O ==
Ogmore	Edward Williams	Labour
Oldham (Two members)	Anthony Crossley	Conservative
Oldham (Two members)	Hamilton Kerr	Conservative
Orkney and Shetland	Sir Robert Hamilton	Liberal
Ormskirk	Sir Samuel Rosbotham	National Labour
Oswestry	Bertie Leighton	Conservative
Oxford	Robert Bourne	Conservative
Oxford University (Two members)	Rt Hon. Lord Hugh Cecil	Conservative
Oxford University (Two members)	Sir Charles Oman	Conservative
== P ==
Paddington North	Brendan Bracken	Conservative
Paddington South	Ernest Taylor	Conservative
Paisley	Hon. Joseph Maclay	Liberal
Peckham	Viscount Borodale	Conservative
Pembrokeshire	Gwilym Lloyd George	Independent Liberal
Penistone	Clifford Glossop	Conservative
Penrith and Cockermouth	Arthur Dixey	Conservative
Penryn and Falmouth	Maurice Petherick	Conservative
Perth	Lord Scone	Conservative
Peterborough	Lord Burghley	Conservative
Petersfield	Rt Hon. William Graham Nicholson	Conservative
Plymouth Devonport	Leslie Hore-Belisha	Liberal National
Plymouth Drake	Rt Hon. Freddie Guest	Conservative
Plymouth Sutton	Nancy Astor	Conservative
Pontefract	Thomas Sotheron-Estcourt	Conservative
Pontypool	Thomas Griffiths	Labour
Pontypridd	David Lewis Davies	Labour
Poplar South	David Morgan Adams	Labour
Portsmouth Central	Hon. Ralph Beaumont	Conservative
Portsmouth North	Sir Bertram Falle, Bt	Conservative
Portsmouth South	Sir Herbert Cayzer, Bt	Conservative
Preston (Two members)	William Kirkpatrick	Conservative
Preston (Two members)	Adrian Moreing	Conservative
Pudsey and Otley	Granville Gibson	Conservative
Putney	Samuel Samuel	Conservative
== Q ==
Queen's University of Belfast	Thomas Sinclair	Ulster Unionist
== R ==
Reading	Alfred Howitt	Conservative
Reigate	Gordon Touche	Conservative
Renfrewshire, East	Douglas Douglas-Hamilton	Conservative
Renfrewshire, West	Henry Scrymgeour-Wedderburn	Conservative
Rhondda East	David Watts-Morgan	Labour
Rhondda West	William John	Labour
Richmond (Yorks)	Thomas Dugdale	Conservative
Richmond upon Thames	Sir Newton Moore	Conservative
Ripon	Rt Hon. John Hills	Conservative
Rochdale	Thomas Jesson	Conservative
Romford	William Hutchison	Conservative
Ross and Cromarty	Rt Hon. Ian Macpherson	Liberal National
Rossendale	Ronald Cross	Conservative
Rotherham	George Herbert	Conservative
Rotherhithe	Norah Runge	Conservative
Rother Valley	Thomas Walter Grundy	Labour
Rothwell	William Lunn	Labour
Roxburgh and Selkirk	The Earl of Dalkeith	Conservative
Royton	Harold Sutcliffe	Conservative
Rugby	David Margesson	Conservative
Rushcliffe	Sir Henry Betterton, Bt	Conservative
Rutherglen	Herbert Moss	Conservative
Rutland and Stamford	Neville Smith-Carington	Conservative
Rye	Sir George Courthope, Bt	Conservative
== S ==
Saffron Walden	Rab Butler	Conservative
St Albans	Sir Francis Fremantle	Conservative
St Helens	Richard Austin Spencer	Conservative
St Ives	Rt Hon. Walter Runciman	Liberal National
St Marylebone	Sir Rennell Rodd	Conservative
St Pancras North	Ian Fraser	Conservative
St Pancras South East	Sir Alfred Beit, Bt	Conservative
St Pancras South West	George Mitcheson	Conservative
Salford North	John Morris	Conservative
Salford South	Hon. John Stourton	Conservative
Salford West	Fred Astbury	Conservative
Salisbury	James Despencer-Robertson	Conservative
Scarborough and Whitby	Sir Paul Latham, Bt	Conservative
Seaham	Rt Hon. Ramsay MacDonald	National Labour
Sedgefield	Roland Jennings	Conservative
Sevenoaks	Rt Hon. Sir Hilton Young	Conservative
Sheffield, Attercliffe	Cecil Pike	Conservative
Sheffield, Brightside	Hamer Russell	Conservative
Sheffield, Central	William Boulton	Conservative
Sheffield, Ecclesall	Sir Samuel Roberts, Bt	Conservative
Sheffield, Hallam	Louis Smith	Conservative
Sheffield, Hillsborough	Gurney Braithwaite	Conservative
Sheffield, Park	Sir Arthur Benn	Conservative
Shipley	James Lockwood	Conservative
Shoreditch	Charles Summersby	Liberal National
Shrewsbury	Arthur Duckworth	Conservative
Skipton	Ernest Bird	Conservative
Smethwick	Roy Wise	Conservative
Southampton (Two members)	William Craven-Ellis	Conservative
Southampton (Two members)	Sir Charles Barrie	Liberal National
Southend-on-Sea	The Countess of Iveagh	Conservative
South Molton	Rt Hon. George Lambert	Liberal National
Southport	Robert Hudson	Conservative
South Shields	Harcourt Johnstone	Liberal
Southwark Central	Ian Horobin	National
Southwark North	Edward Strauss	Liberal National
Southwark South East	George Powell	Conservative
Sowerby	Malcolm McCorquodale	Conservative
Spelthorne	Sir Reginald Blaker, Bt	Conservative
Spennymoor	Joseph Batey	Labour
Spen Valley	Rt Hon. Sir John Simon	Liberal National
Stafford	Rt Hon. William Ormsby-Gore	Conservative
Stalybridge and Hyde	Sydney Hope	Conservative
Stepney Limehouse	Clement Attlee	Labour
Stepney Mile End	William O'Donovan	Conservative
Stirling and Falkirk	James Reid	Conservative
Stirlingshire East and Clackmannan	James Wellwood Johnston	Conservative
Stirlingshire West	J. Campbell Ker	Conservative
Stockport (Two members)	Samuel Hammersley	Conservative
Stockport (Two members)	Alan Dower	Conservative
Stockton on Tees	Harold Macmillan	Conservative
Stoke Newington	Sir George Jones	Conservative
Stoke-on-Trent	Ida Copeland	Conservative
Stone	Sir Joseph Lamb	Conservative
Stourbridge	Robert Morgan	Conservative
Streatham	Sir William Lane-Mitchell	Conservative
Stretford	Gustav Renwick	Conservative
Stroud	Walter Perkins	Conservative
Sudbury	Rt Hon. Henry Burton	Conservative
Sunderland (Two members)	Luke Thompson	Conservative
Sunderland (Two members)	Samuel Storey	Conservative
Surrey East	James Galbraith	Conservative
Swansea East	David Williams	Labour
Swansea West	Lewis Jones	Liberal National
Swindon	Sir Reginald Banks	Conservative
== T ==
Tamworth	Rt Hon. Sir Arthur Steel-Maitland, Bt	Conservative
Taunton	Andrew Gault	Conservative
Tavistock	Colin Patrick	Conservative
Thirsk and Malton	Robin Turton	Conservative
Thornbury	Derrick Gunston	Conservative
Tiverton	Gilbert Acland-Troyte	Conservative
Tonbridge	Herbert Spender-Clay	Conservative
Torquay	Charles Williams	Conservative
Totnes	Samuel Harvey	Conservative
Tottenham North	Edward Doran	Conservative
Tottenham South	Noel Palmer	National Labour
Twickenham	Sir John Ferguson	Conservative
Tynemouth	Alexander Russell	Conservative
== U ==
University of Wales	Ernest Evans	Liberal
Uxbridge	John Llewellin	Conservative
== W ==
Wakefield	George Hillman	Conservative
Wallasey	John Moore-Brabazon	Conservative
Wallsend	Irene Ward	Conservative
Walsall	Joseph Leckie	National
Walthamstow East	Sir Brograve Beauchamp, Bt	Conservative
Walthamstow West	Valentine McEntee	Labour
Wandsworth Central	Henry Jackson	Conservative
Wansbeck	Bernard Cruddas	Conservative
Warrington	Noel Goldie	Conservative
Warwick and Leamington	Anthony Eden	Conservative
Waterloo	Malcolm Bullock	Conservative
Watford	Sir Dennis Herbert	Conservative
Wednesbury	Viscount Ednam	Conservative
Wellingborough	Archibald James	Conservative
Wells	Anthony Muirhead	Conservative
Wentworth	George Harry Hirst	Labour
West Bromwich	Alexander Ramsay	Conservative
Westbury	Robert Grimston	Conservative
Western Isles	Thomas Ramsay	Liberal National
West Ham Plaistow	Will Thorne	Labour
West Ham Silvertown	Jack Jones	Labour
West Ham Stratford	Thomas Groves	Labour
West Ham Upton	Alfred Chotzner	Conservative
Westhoughton	Rhys Davies	Labour
Westminster Abbey	Otho Nicholson	Conservative
Westminster St George's	Duff Cooper	Conservative
Westmorland	Hon. Oliver Stanley	Conservative
Weston-super-Mare	Lord Erskine	Conservative
Whitechapel & St Georges	Barnett Janner	Liberal
Whitehaven	William Nunn	Conservative
Widnes	Roland Robinson	Conservative
Wigan	John Parkinson	Labour
Willesden East	Daniel Somerville	Conservative
Willesden West	Mavis Tate	Conservative
Wimbledon	Sir John Power, Bt	Conservative
Winchester	Robert Ellis	Conservative
Windsor	Annesley Somerville	Conservative
Wirral	Sir Christopher Clayton	Conservative
Wolverhampton Bilston	Geoffrey Peto	Conservative
Wolverhampton East	Geoffrey Mander	Liberal
Wolverhampton West	Robert Bird	Conservative
Woodbridge	Walter Ross-Taylor	Conservative
Wood Green	Rt Hon. Godfrey Locker-Lampson	Conservative
Woolwich East	George Hicks	Labour
Woolwich West	Rt Hon. Sir Kingsley Wood	Conservative
Worcester	Crawford Greene	Conservative
Workington	Tom Cape	Labour
The Wrekin	James Baldwin-Webb	Conservative
Wrexham	Aled Roberts	Liberal
Wycombe	Sir Alfred Knox	Conservative
== Y ==
Yeovil	George Davies	Conservative
York	Roger Lumley	Conservative

== By-elections ==
See the list of United Kingdom by-elections.

== See also ==
- UK general election, 1931
- List of MPs for constituencies in Wales (1931–1935)
- List of parliaments of the United Kingdom
