= James Duckworth (businessman, born 1869) =

British businessman and politician

James Duckworth JP (1869 – 28 December 1937), was a British company director and Liberal Party politician who served as Mayor of Rochdale.

== Background ==
Duckworth was the eldest son of Sir James Duckworth, who had founded a chain a grocery shops known popularly as "Jimmy Duck's" and a Liberal Member of Parliament. He was educated at Ashville College, Harrogate and Manchester University. In 1894 he married Mary Petrie of Rochdale. They had four sons and one daughter. He was appointed a Justice of the peace in 1911, serving in the Rochdale area. He was an Honorary Captain, 6th Battalion of the Lancashire Voluntary Regiment.

== Professional career ==
Duckworth was a director of various companies in Lancashire. The family business "James Duckworth Ltd" was incorporated in 1895 as a limited company, with him as vice-chairman. In 1916 he worked for the Ministry of Food in London.

== Political career ==
Duckworth was first elected as a councillor to Rochdale Borough Council. He was Liberal candidate for the Bury division of Lancashire at the 1923 General Election. Bury was a Unionist seat where the Liberals had come third at the preceding election in 1922. The 1923 result was similar, with Duckworth managing to marginally increase the Liberal share of the vote.

He was again Liberal candidate for Bury at the 1924 General Election. However, in a bad election for the Liberals across the UK, Duckworth saw his vote share drop. He did not stand for parliament again.

=== Electoral record ===
General Election 1923: Bury
Party	Candidate	Votes	%	±%
Unionist	Charles Ainsworth	10,680	40.3	−0.9
Labour	Harry Wright Wallace	9,568	36.1	−0.6
Liberal	James Duckworth	6,251	23.6	+1.5
Majority		1,112	4.2	−0.3
Turnout			80.8	−0.5
Unionist hold		Swing	-0.1	

General Election 1924: Bury
Party	Candidate	Votes	%	±%
Unionist	Charles Ainsworth	13,382	46.9	+6.6
Labour	Harry Wright Wallace	10,286	36.1	0.0
Liberal	James Duckworth	4,847	17.0	−6.6
Majority		3,096	10.8	+6.6
Turnout			86.5	+5.7
Unionist hold		Swing	+3.3	

Duckworth remained involved in Rochdale municipal politics. In November 1937 he was elected Mayor of Rochdale. He died the following month, and in an unprecedented move, the council chose his wife Mary to succeed him, even though she was not a Councillor or Alderman. She was Rochdale's first ever female mayor. She served out the remainder of her husband's term of office and soon after won a by-election to become Rochdale's first ever woman councillor.
