= Farmers Guardian =

- Type: Weekly newspaper
- Owner: Agriconnect
- Founder: Joseph Livesey
- Editor: Olivia Midgley
- News editor: Alex Black
- Founded: 10 February 1844
- Website: www.farmersguardian.com

Farmers Guardian is a weekly newspaper aimed at the British farming industry. It provides comprehensive and topical news with Livestock, Arable and Machinery sections; as well as business information and latest market prices. It is sold nationally and is published each Friday. Based in Preston, Lancashire, it was for many years owned by United Business Media but it, and sister title Pulse, were sold to UK business-to-business publisher AgriBriefing in February 2012 in a deal worth £10 million.

Related products in include: Dairy Farmer, Arable Farming and the website. The website was launched in February 2015, and includes sections on news, arable, livestock, and machinery.

== History ==
The newspaper started life on 10 February 1844, priced 4½d, as the Preston Guardian, and was founded by Joseph Livesey, the "father" of the total abstinence movement in Britain to support the campaign for the repeal of the Corn Laws. He was assisted by his sons: William, as sub-editor and manager of the business department (until forced to retire by ill health); John, who came in as editor at the age of 21; and younger sons Franklin and Howard. Livesey Snr was, however, the overall superintendent and wrote the leaders for local news items. His son James did not participate in that familial enterprise; instead he turned his hand to building railways and later made a name for himself with the construction of the Transandean Railway (1887 to 1910), "one of the greatest engineering feats in South America" topped by a 1-mile-long tunnel at a 10,466 ft altitude; in 1890 he also designed the first cantilever bridge built in Spain, although the company he worked for floundered and the designing engineer of the company that took over the work only retained the cantilever principle of his project.

The success of the newspaper can be attested by a remark of Richard Cobden:

I never remember a case of a local newspaper succeeding as this has done in so short a time and subject to the same competition.

The paper lasted for 15 years under the Livesey's management, until 1859. By then it had become a valuable commodity and was sold to local businessman and fellow teetotaller, Councillor George Toulmin JP (father of the journalist, newspaper proprietor and Liberal Party politician George Toulmin (1857–1923)), who owned the paper until 1883. Thomas Wemyss Reid was an editor from 1864 to 1866.

In 1872, a new office building was completed in Fishergate, Preston, and the paper moved into the ground floor. The building was later shared with the Lancashire Evening Post and was demolished in 1989. The paper lasted under its original name until May 1958 and then continued to the present day as the Farmers Guardian.

John Boyle O'Reilly, a future Irish poet, journalist and activist in the United States, worked as an apprentice at the Preston Guardian in the early 1860s.
