= William Barefoot =

British politician (1872–1941)

William Barefoot (1872 – November 1941) was a notable local politician in south-east London during the early part of the 20th century.

He was born in Frances Street, Woolwich, and lived for a time in Griffin Road, Plumstead.

He served as a local councillor in Eltham for 33 years, was mayor of the Metropolitan Borough of Woolwich three times (1925–1927), and served on the national executive committee of the Labour Party. In 1928, he wrote Twenty-five years' history of the Woolwich Labour Party, 1903–1928, published by the "Kentish Independent" Printing Works. He died from a heart attack in the Woolwich council chamber.

Barefoot was instrumental in the creation of the Well Hall Pleasaunce as a public park and gardens. A plaque there reads: "He loved nature and his efforts to beautify Woolwich are reflected in the creation of this Pleasaunce". A small park, William Barefoot Gardens in Alliance Road, Plumstead, and William Barefoot Drive in Coldharbour are also named after him.

Party political offices
Preceded by J. R. Clynes	Trades councils representative on the National Executive Committee of the Labour Party; 1909–1910	Succeeded by Tom Fox
Civic offices
Preceded by James Newman	Mayor of Woolwich; 1925–1927	Succeeded by Charles Henry Langham
