= James Kenyon (politician) =

English textile manufacturer and politician

Kenyon in 1895.

James Kenyon (1846 – 25 February 1924) was an English textile manufacturer and Conservative Party politician from Bury in Lancashire, 1895–1902.

== Early life ==
Kenyon was the second son of James Kenyon and his first wife Margaret (née Whittaker) of Crimble, near Heywood in Lancashire. He was educated at Bury Grammar School and at Liverpool Collegiate Institution.

He was a prosperous woollen and cotton manufacturer with a large factory in Bury. He became a Justice of the Peace (J.P.) for Lancashire, a Fellow of the Royal Colonial Institute, and was chairman of the Liverpool Storage Company. His residence was listed in 1901 as Walshaw Hall, Bury, which later became a residential care home.

In 1875, he had married Elise/ Elisa Augusta Genth, a classically trained musician with German parents, from Burnage. (although some censuses state that Elise was born in Huddersfield like some of her older siblings, others state Rusholme, where she was baptised and James and Elise were also married; none give Burnage as her place of birth) They had four sons who assisted in running the business: James died from illness as a result of service in World War I, Charles became a successful actor/manager in London and Myles played cricket for Lancashire.

== Political career ==
He was elected at the 1895 general election as the Member of Parliament (MP) for borough of Bury, having stood unsuccessfully in nearby Heywood at the 1885 election.

He was re-elected in Bury in 1900, but resigned his seat in the House of Commons two years later, by the procedural device of becoming Steward of the Manor of Northstead on 29 April 1902.

Parliament of the United Kingdom
Preceded by Henry James	Member of Parliament for Bury; 1895 – 1902	Succeeded by Sir George Toulmin
