= 1902 Bury by-election =

UK parliamentary by-election

- 10 May 1902

Candidate	Toulmin	Lawson
Party	Liberal	Liberal Unionist
Popular vote	4,213	3,799
Percentage	52.6%	47.4%
MP before election
James Kenyon
Conservative
Subsequent MP
George Toulmin
Liberal

The 1902 Bury by-election was a by-election held in England on 10 May 1902 for the House of Commons constituency of Bury in Lancashire.

It was the first by-election gain by the Liberal Party from the ruling Conservatives in the Parliament of 1900–1906 and it can arguably be said to have set in motion the swing to the Liberals from the Tories which brought twenty by-election gains in all over the following months, leading to the Liberals landslide victory in the 1906 general election.

== Vacancy ==
The election was triggered by the resignation of the sitting Conservative Member of Parliament (MP), James Kenyon.

== Candidates ==
The Conservatives and their Liberal Unionist Party allies already had a candidate in the field, as Kenyon had made known his intention to stand down because of ill-health. They had chosen Harry Lawson, the former Liberal MP.

Toulmin

The Liberals re-selected their candidate from the 1900 general election George Toulmin, a Lancashire newspaper proprietor.

It was reported that at a meeting of socialists at Bury on 28 April 1902 it was agreed to support a socialist candidate at the forthcoming election, if one were nominated. There were splits in the socialist camp however. The Independent Labour Party decided to dissociate itself from the decision of the Social Democratic Federation to bring forward a candidate and chose to support Toulmin. The Labour Representation Committee in Bury held a meeting to decide their position but declined in the end to stand a candidate. The traditional Lib-Lab alignment seemed to be holding in Bury with the trade unions in the cotton industry coming out strongly for Toulmin.

== Issues ==
=== Irish Home Rule ===
A principal issue in the election was the question of Irish Home Rule. This was the issue which had split the Liberal Party in 1886 and the constituency of Bury was typical of many at the time. The sitting Liberal MP, Sir Henry James had defected to the Liberals Unionists in opposition to Home Rule and he retained his seat unopposed at the 1886 general election. With Conservative support Bury had been held for the Unionist cause at each election since. When the by-election was called one of the first acts recorded was a public vote of support for Toulmin by the Irish Nationalist electors of the town, on the basis that they had received from him a satisfactory declaration of his sympathy with the cause of Home Rule. They urged all Irish voters in the constituency to vote for Toulmin to prevent the election of Lawson, who they described as a renegade on Home Rule and a coercionist. A meeting of Roman Catholic voters in the town was held on 4 May 1902 to discuss the election but no resolutions of support for either candidate were passed.

=== Levy on corn ===
Taxation and the policy of Free Trade once more became central election issues at Bury. The Conservative government had introduced a duty on corn as a revenue measure to help meet the cost of the Boer War. The Liberal leader, Henry Campbell-Bannerman wrote to Toulmin deploring the government's proposed introduction of a duty on corn, claiming this would lead to the poorest in the community having to pay more for their bread or suffering some deterioration in the quality of their loaf and stating that this measure was the first step in the government's plan to reverse the country's traditional Free Trade approach. The Conservatives said most of any extra burden would fall on businessmen at home or abroad and what Lawson described in a speech as the 'middlemen' adding that the British consumer would have to pay only one extra penny on every 32 loaves. The Times newspaper identified the one shilling corn duty as "the real horse [the candidates] are riding on".

=== Education and the Boer War ===
Other issues included the Education Bill. Toulmin apparently held strong views against the legislation although as Bury had no school board as set up by the Elementary Education Act 1870, it was not thought to have such great resonance as elsewhere. The Boer War was also the subject of debate between the candidates. Joseph Chamberlain the great Liberal Unionist Secretary of State for the Colonies urged the electors of Bury not to support a party willing to surrender to the Boers. The voters of Bury were probably as patriotic as any other men but the spiralling cost of the war was a real issue for them. First the government had raised income tax and now the corn levy was thought to herald a bread tax and it was this perception which fostered support for the Liberals rather than the pro-war Unionists.

== Result ==
The result was a Liberal gain from the Conservatives perhaps against the odds. The Times, taking the temperature of local opinion in the constituency, had predicted a Unionist hold by a majority of around 500 votes.

Bury by-election, 1902
Party	Candidate	Votes	%	±%
Liberal	George Toulmin	4,213	52.6	+8.3
Liberal Unionist	Harry Lawson	3,799	47.4	−8.3
Majority		414	5.2	N/A
Turnout		8,012	91.2	+4.8
Liberal gain from Conservative		Swing	+9.0	

The corn tax issue seems to have been more of true vote winner for the Liberals than even political correspondents anticipated as Toulmin took the seat with a majority of 414 – a swing of 9% and he continued to hold it at the next three general elections. The corn duty continued to play well for the Liberals at forthcoming by-elections in predominantly working class constituencies. Government hopes that its unpopularity would soon fade were misplaced. The Conservative MP for Oldham, Winston Churchill conceded to Prime Minister Arthur Balfour six months after the Bury result that the corn tax remained 'very unpopular'.
