= Richard Walker (MP) =

English Liberal Party politician

Richard Walker (1784 – 1 February 1855) was an English Liberal Party politician who sat in the House of Commons from 1832 to 1852.

Walker was born in Bury the eldest son of William Walker and his wife Mary Ormerod. His father was a woollen manufacturer and head of the family firm of William Walker and Sons of Stanley Street Bury.

Walker was elected at the 1832 general election as the Member of Parliament (MP) for the newly enfranchised borough of Bury in Lancashire, and held the seat until he stood down from the House of Commons at the 1852 general election.

Walker married Ann Scholes, daughter of John Scholes of Bury.

Parliament of the United Kingdom
New constituency	Member of Parliament for Bury; 1832 – 1852	Succeeded by Frederick Peel
