= Peel's Restaurant =

- Interactive map of Peel's Restaurant

Restaurant information
- Head chef: Robert Palmer
- Food type: British
- Dress code: Formal
- Rating: Michelin stars AA Rosettes
- Location: Hampton Manor, Shadowbrook Lane, Hampton in Arden, England, B92 0EN
- Coordinates: 52.4256°N 1.7055°W
- Seating capacity: 28
- Website: hamptonmanor.com

Peel's Restaurant is situated in Hampton Manor, Hampton in Arden, England. It currently holds one Michelin star and four AA Rosettes. Hampton Manor is a Grade II listed building. Originally the family home of Frederick Peel, son of Prime Minister Robert Peel, the Manor was acquired by hoteliers Derrick and Janet Hill in March 2008. Under the stewardship of their son, James, and daughter in law Fjona, today it runs as a Restaurant with Rooms.

Robert Palmer took on the role of Head Chef at the age of 27. His dishes are defined by his use of seasonal produce cooked using modern techniques.

== History ==
=== Hampton Manor ===
Robert Peel, former Prime Minister and founder of the British Police Force, bought the land at Hampton from Isaac William Lillingston. On his death his son, Frederick Peel, commissioned the building of the current Manor House. In 1855 William Eden Nesfield designed the Neo-Tudor Gothic building that we see today. The Peel family played an important role in the Industrial Revolution, particularly due to their part in the mechanisation of the cotton and spinning industry. Their motto, 'Industria', is carved into the oak panelling on Hampton Manor's main staircase. This celebration of industry is juxtaposed with the later Arts and Crafts additions that Frederick Peel made to the land, re-commissioning Nesfield to build a clocktower in 1872, and Thomas Hayton Mawson to design a walled garden with a Jacobean gateway in around 1900.

In March 2008 the current owners, hoteliers Derrick and Jan Hill, acquired the estate. They embarked on a multi-million pound renovation project and in 2019 opened Hampton Manor as a hotel with 15 bedrooms and restaurant. Today their son James and his wife, Creative Director Fjona, run the business. When Fjona re-designed the interiors of the Manor she took inspiration from its Arts and Crafts past; decorating the bedrooms with William Morris wallpapers and working with local craftspeople to create bespoke, handmade furnishings. In 2017, with the success of Peel's Restaurant, James and Fjona rebranded the Manor to a Restaurant with Rooms. At the inaugural Midlands Food Drink and Hospitality Awards (formerly Birmingham Food Drink and Hospitality Awards), Hampton Manor won Best Afternoon Tea, Fine Dining Restaurant [Peel's Restaurant] and Boutique Hotel. The following year Hampton Manor's Craig Newman won Best General Manager.

=== Peel's Restaurant ===
Hampton Manor is home to Peel's Restaurant. Opening in 2008, it wasn't until 2016 when Head Chef, Rob Palmer, took over the kitchen that the restaurant took gastronomic strides. Rob was just 27 when he took on the Head Chef role at Peel's having made the move from the Forest, Dorridge arriving at Peel's as Junior Sous Chef under Martyn Pearn. From the offset Rob has been inspired by local British, seasonal produce which he cooks using modern techniques. Heirloom tomato with burrata and basil, asparagus with burrata and chicken and beetroot with goat's cheese are the three garden inspired starters that have re-appeared, re-imagined, seasonally on Rob's menu. Peel's Restaurant maintained its star in the 2018 awards.

== Reception ==
Richard McComb of the Birmingham Post published news of Hampton Manor's refurbishment in September 2010, but from the beginning it was the food in Peel's Restaurant that received acclaim. In August 2015 Hampton Manor and Peel's Restaurant received national coverage when Fiona Duncan visited on behalf of The Sunday Telegraph. Fiona awarded the Manor 10/10 for food and drink and included in her roundup of the 'top ten hotels to visit and stay at in 2016' as her 'best surprise'. Following Peel's' acquisition of a Michelin-star, she revisited her review in December 2017 for Country and Town House Magazine, stating it as a favourite hotel restaurant with a star [print].

In December 2015 Hampton Manor received more national press coverage as The Times included it in The Cool Hotel Guide: giving it a review of 8.5/10 and stating that 'food is an event'. In November 2017 The Sunday Times names Hampton Manor one of the main cosy destinations in the UK.

On gaining its Michelin-star, Peel's restaurant features in both local and national press pieces including being named in London Evening Standard's bucket list of Michelin destinations to look out for in 2017, and being the lead feature on ITV News Central's Birmingham foodie Michelin alert. The London Evening Standard named the Manor its 'cool place of the week' in May 2017. The Birmingham Mail carried out a full feature on Peel's as Solihull's first starred restaurant. In December 2017 Hampton Manor was named 'one of the leading foodie destinations in the UK' in Stella Magazine of The Sunday Times.

Today, reviews focus on the Manor's reception and restaurant renovation, with Birmingham bloggers starting to visit the restaurant.
