= Coldharbour, Greenwich =

Area of south east London

Coordinates: 51.4312°N 0.05209°E

Coldharbour (Eltham)
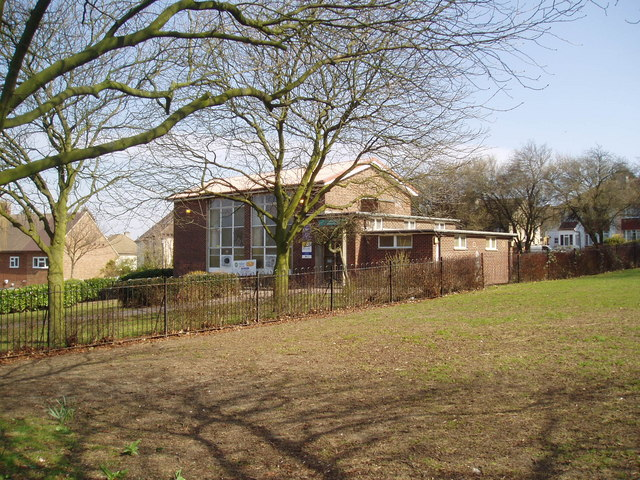
- Coldharbour Estate Community Hall

- Location within Greater London
- Population: 13,062 (2011 Census. Coldharbour and New Eltham Ward)
- OS grid reference: TQ427722
- London borough: Greenwich
- Ceremonial county: Greater London
- Region: London
- Country: England
- Sovereign state: United Kingdom
- Post town: LONDON
- Postcode district: SE9
- Dialling code: 020
- Police: Metropolitan
- Fire: London
- Ambulance: London
- UK Parliament: Eltham and Chislehurst
- London Assembly: Greenwich and Lewisham

Coldharbour is an area of South East London and post-war housing estate within the Royal Borough of Greenwich. It is located to the south of Eltham and north of Chislehurst.

== History ==
=== Coldharbour Farm ===
The area on which the estate now stands was a farm referred to as 'Merry Fields' in a 1761 map of Kent. By 1769, the farm was known as Coldharbour and consisted of a small holding and two farm buildings opposite the entrance to Elmstead Lane, on what is now Speke Hill.

The first farm bailiff for Coldharbour recorded in census records was Thomas Blanche in 1851, with labourers and shepherds living on the site. By 1861, Ephraim Jackson was the farm bailiff, living with his wife, children and three dairy labourers. He held this position until 1891, during which time the farm had expanded with various farmhands and milkmen living in the farm buildings and surrounding cottages.

Following Ephraim's retirement in 1891, the brothers Richard and James Higgs, at the time aged 21 and 29 respectively, became the resident farmers on Coldharbour Farm. They lived in the farmhouse consisting of one furnished room. By 1911, James Higgs had sole running of the farm with his wife, children and three servants, as Richard had departed to run a farm in Dorset.

In 1913, J.B Stocker bought the farm and his son Cecil ran it on his behalf until 1919, when Sydney Baldry took over. He was succeeded in 1936 by the final farm bailiff of Coldharbour, Thomas Spooner, who remained until the completion of the housing estate and removal of the final farm buildings in 1953.

=== Coldharbour Estate ===
The Coldharbour housing estate began development in 1947 on the site of Coldharbour Farm, by then the last working farm in London, built by the Metropolitan Borough of Woolwich. It was created in a garden suburb style in order to house borough residents made homeless by The Blitz and young families. The majority of initial residents, therefore, were rehoused from Woolwich or Eltham, and to a lesser extent Plumstead, Charlton and surrounding boroughs.

The first house to be built, 2 Wynford Way, was opened by Aneurin Bevan, the Minister for Health, in 1947. The 'bottom end' of the estate was built first, with Wynford Way, Woodcroft, Littlemede and Bromhedge completed by the end of 1948, many of which were built in concrete due to post-war lack of building supplies. The area from the Mound to the Course and surrounding roads were open to residents the following year, with Southold Rise and Speke Hill complete by 1950. The roads surrounding the Farmhouse were ready by the end of 1951, Beanshaw in 1952 and finally the roads at the south of the estate, between Beanshaw and Hever Croft, were ready by 1953. The church of St Alban was completed in the same year. The estate was due to be officially opened by Queen Elizabeth the Queen Mother in May 1952, but that part of her tour was cancelled. When she finally arrived to "commemorate the completion of the Coldharbour Housing Estate" on 9 May 1957, the Kentish Independent''s headline the following day was "Five Year Wait For Royal Visit But It Was Well Worth It".

The first official resident of the estate was Ethel Lewino of 1 William Barefoot Drive, who lived on the estate from 1946 until 1948 when she emigrated with her family to Australia.

Coldharbour Farm and subsequently the Coldharbour Estate were in the civil parish of Eltham, which was in Kent until 1889 when it became part of the County of London and from 1900 formed part of the Metropolitan Borough of Woolwich. The metropolitan borough was abolished in 1965 and Coldharbour then became part of the Royal Borough of Greenwich.

== Naming and location ==
The boundaries of the Coldharbour Estate are Mottingham Road and White Horse Hill to the west, Chapel Farm Road to the north, Green Lane and Crouch Croft to the east and Mainridge Road to the south.

William Barefoot Drive forms the main road running through the estate. This road was originally named Hellensmead until renamed in honour of a former Eltham councillor and three times Mayor of Woolwich. Another renamed road is Sandling Rise, which was called Hurstmead until 1951. Other roads on the estate named after local personalities and historical events, include Kingsley Wood Drive, Lambarde Avenue and Great Harry Drive. Many of the remaining roads retain the names of the ancient fields they were built on, including Littlemede, Southold Rise, Altash Way and Woodcroft.

== Transport ==
=== Rail ===
The closest railway stations to Coldharbour are Mottingham, New Eltham & Elmstead Woods.

=== Bus ===
- 124 to Eltham and to Catford via Grove Park
- 126 to Eltham and to Bromley via Grove Park
- 161 to North Greenwich via Eltham & Woolwich and to Chislehurst
- 273 to Lewisham via Grove Park and to Petts Wood via Chislehurst
- 314 to Eltham and to New Addington via Bromley
- N136 to Oxford Circus via Grove Park, Catford, Lewisham & Peckham and to Chislehurst

== Education ==
The two primary schools located on the Coldharbour Estate are Montbelle Primary School (formerly Ruxley Manor Primary School) and Greenacres Primary School.

== Pubs ==
The two public houses built on the estate upon opening were the Farmhouse and the Royal Eltham, which has since been demolished.

== Churches ==
St Albans Church (Church of England) is the main place of worship on the estate. It is a subparish of St Andrew's, Mottingham. Coldharbour Evangelical Free Church is an independent Protestant church located nearby. The serving Roman Catholic churches are the joint churches of Our Lady Help of Christians, Mottingham and St Patrick's, Chislehurst.
