= Robert Needham Philips =

English merchant and manufacturer

Robert Needham Philips DL (1815 – 28 February 1890) was an English merchant and manufacturer in the Lancashire textiles business, a Liberal Party politician, and the grandfather of the Whig historian G. M. Trevelyan.

He lived in Manchester and in Warwickshire, and after holding at least three ceremonial appointments he was the Member of Parliament (MP) for the borough of Bury, a mill town which was then in Lancashire, for a total of 22 years between 1857 and 1885.

== Family and early life ==
Philips was the youngest son Robert Philips, a merchant of The Park, Manchester, and his wife Anne née Needham. His older brother Mark (1800–1873) was one of the first two MPs to be elected for Manchester in 1832, after the Great Reform Act had given city parliamentary representation for the first time. The family's extensive estate on the boundary of Whitefield and Prestwich, in Greater Manchester (now within the Metropolitan Borough of Bury), is now Philips Park.

His father's business partnership, Philips, Wood & Co, was dissolved in 1844 after the death of both partners.

The younger Robert was educated at Rugby School and at Manchester College.

He married twice, firstly in 1845 to Anna Maria Yates, daughter of Joseph Brooks Yates from Liverpool, who died in 1850. He married again in 1852 to Anna Maria's cousin, Mary Ellen Yates from London. His daughter Caroline was married in 1869 to George Otto Trevelyan (1838–1928), who was later a baronet; their youngest son was the historian G. M. Trevelyan (1876–1962), and their eldest son was the Liberal MP Sir Charles Trevelyan (1870–1958), who later joined the Labour Party and served in Ramsay MacDonald's cabinets as President of the Board of Education.

His residences were listed in 1881 as The Park, Manchester, and Welcombe, Stratford upon Avon, Warwickshire. He had inherited Welcombe House in 1873 on the death of his brother, and on his death the estate passed to his daughter Caroline.

== Business interests ==
He was a partner in a partnership of smallware manufacturers, with interests in Staffordshire, Lancashire, Westmorland and London, which was dissolved in 1855. He was also engaged in a similar partnership which was restructured in 1867. After his death in 1890 at the age of 75, a further partnership was dissolved, which had involved a bleaching and dyeing enterprise at Bagley in Lancashire, and bobbin manufacturing at Staveley in Westmorland.

== Political career ==
Philips was appointed as a Deputy Lieutenant of Lancashire 1853, and of Warwickshire in 1855. He was Sheriff of Lancashire from 1856 to 1857.

He was elected as the MP for Bury at the 1857 general election, but held the seat for only two years until he stood down from the House of Commons at the 1859 general election. He stood again in 1865, after which he held the seat until he retired from Parliament of the United Kingdom at the 1885 general election.

== See also ==
- J. & N. Philips
- Philips Park, Prestwich

Parliament of the United Kingdom
Preceded by Frederick Peel	Member of Parliament for Bury; 1857 – 1859	Succeeded by Frederick Peel
Preceded by Frederick Peel	Member of Parliament for Bury; 1865 – 1885	Succeeded by Sir Henry James
Professional and academic associations
Preceded by William Nield	President of the Manchester Statistical Society; 1851–53	Succeeded by James Heywood
