= George Toulmin =

British politician

George Toulmin MP

Member of Parliament for Bury
- In office 1902–1918
- Preceded by: James Kenyon
- Succeeded by: Charles Ainsworth

Personal details
- Born: 17 March 1857
- Died: 21 January 1923 (aged 65)
- Party: Liberal Party
- Spouse: Mary Elizabeth Edelston

Sir George Toulmin (17 March 1857 – 21 January 1923) was an English journalist, newspaper proprietor and Liberal Party politician.

== Family and education ==
George Toulmin was born in Bolton, Lancashire, the son of Councillor George Toulmin JP of Preston. He was educated at the Grammar School in Preston. In 1882 he married Mary Elizabeth Edelston from Preston, the daughter of a local Alderman; they had two sons and two daughters. In religion Toulmin was a Wesleyan.

== Career ==
Toulmin began as a journalist but eventually rose to the top of his profession. From 1860 he took over the ownership of the Preston Guardian newspaper. In 1886, he founded the Lancashire Daily Post, becoming its managing director. With the help of his brother he had also established the Blackburn Times and the Warrington Examiner. He was Chairman of the Press Association from 1919 to 1920, was sometime Hon. Treasurer of the Newspaper Society as well as a Fellow of the Institute of Journalists.

== Politics ==
Toulmin first stood for Parliament at the 1900 general election when he represented the Liberal Party at Bury standing under the description of Radical. Two years later he got the chance to contest the seat again when the sitting Conservative MP, James Kenyon resigned causing a by-election in Bury. Toulmin was re-adopted by Bury Liberal Association and he gained the seat at the by-election which was held on 10 May 1902, turning a Tory majority of 849 into a Liberal one of 414.

Toulmin held his seat at the general elections of 1906, January 1910 and December 1910. However, in 1918, despite supporting the coalition government of David Lloyd George and being awarded the Coalition coupon, he lost Bury to the Conservatives in a three-cornered contest. He did not stand for the House of Commons again.

== Interests, honours and other appointments ==
Like many Liberals of the day, Toulmin was pre-occupied with social questions and the need for social reform and improvement. In February 1908, he introduced a Bill into the House of Commons designed to establish wages boards to fix minimum wages in certain trades. Among the Parliamentary bodies Toulmin sat on were the National Health Insurance Joint Committee, set up under the National Insurance Act 1911 and the Select Committee on London Motor Traffic to look into the increasing number of fatal traffic accidents due to motor omnibus and other power-driven vehicles, of which he was Chairman. His committee recommended setting up a new traffic authority, increased powers to control traffic by County Councils, special speed limits and greater education and awareness for schoolchildren of traffic dangers.

Toulmin was knighted in 1911. He was also a Justice of the Peace for the County Borough of Preston (1897) and for Lancashire (1906).

== Death ==
Toulmin died on 21 January 1923, aged 65 years.

Parliament of the United Kingdom
Preceded by James Kenyon	Member of Parliament for Bury; 1902 – 1918	Succeeded by Charles Ainsworth
