= Frederick Peel =

British politician (1823–1906)

The Right Honourable Sir Frederick Peel KCMG PC MP
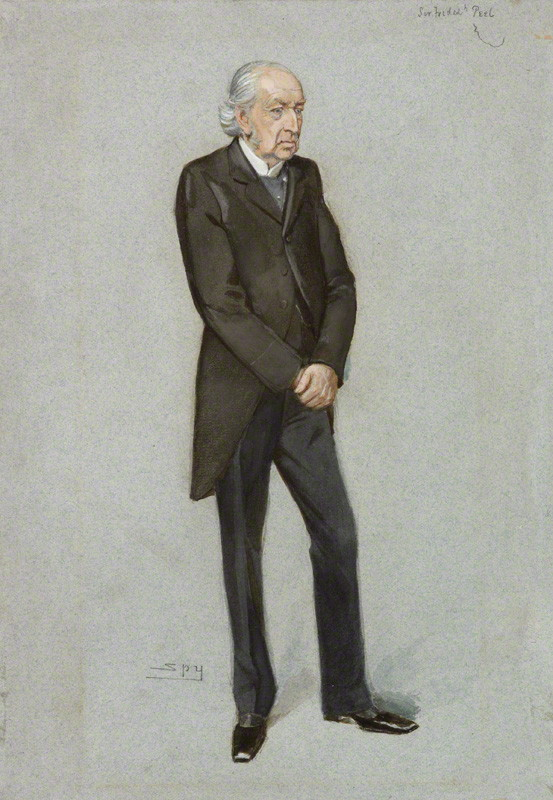
- "a Railway Commissioner". Caricature by "Spy" (Leslie Ward) published in Vanity Fair in 1903.

Financial Secretary to the Treasury
- In office 2 November 1860 – 19 August 1865
- Monarch: Victoria
- Prime Minister: The Viscount Palmerston
- Preceded by: Samuel Laing
- Succeeded by: Hugh Childers

Personal details
- Born: 26 October 1823
- Died: 6 June 1906 (aged 82)
- Party: Liberal
- Parents: Sir Robert Peel; Julia Floyd
- Education: Trinity College, Cambridge

Sir Frederick Peel KCMG PC MP (26 October 1823 – 6 June 1906) was a British Liberal Party politician and railway commissioner.

== Background and education ==
Peel was second son of Sir Robert Peel, Prime Minister of the United Kingdom, and his wife Julia, daughter of General Sir John Floyd, 1st Baronet. He was the brother of Sir Robert Peel, 3rd Baronet, Sir William Peel and Arthur Peel, 1st Viscount Peel. He was educated at Harrow and Trinity College, Cambridge, becoming a barrister in 1849. At Cambridge he was a member of the Pitt Club.

== Political career ==
Peel entered parliament in that year, when he was elected at an unopposed by-election in February 1849 as a Member of Parliament (MP) for Leominster. At the next general election, in 1852, he was returned as the MP for Bury, but was defeated in 1857. He regained the Bury seat in 1859, and remained in the House of Commons until a further defeat in 1865. He served as Under-Secretary of State for War and the Colonies under Lord John Russell from 1851 to 1852 and under Lord Aberdeen from 1852 to 1854, as Under-Secretary of State for the Colonies under Aberdeen from 1854 to 1855 and as Under-Secretary of State for War under Lord Palmerston from 1855 to 1857, when he was sworn of the Privy Council. He again held office under Palmerston and then Russell as Financial Secretary to the Treasury from 1860 to 1865.

Peel's chief service to the state was in connection with the Railway and Canal Commission. He was appointed a commissioner on the inception of this body in 1873, and was its president until its reconstruction in 1888, remaining a member of the commission until his death in 1906. He was appointed a Knight Commander of the Order of St Michael and St George in 1869.

== Death ==
Peel died in June 1906, aged 82.

== See also ==
- Peel's Restaurant

Parliament of the United Kingdom
Preceded by Henry Barkly; George Arkwright	Member of Parliament for Leominster; 1849–1852; With: George Arkwright	Succeeded by John George Phillimore; George Arkwright
Preceded by Richard Walker	Member of Parliament for Bury; 1852–1857	Succeeded by Robert Needham Philips
Preceded by Robert Needham Philips	Member of Parliament for Bury; 1859–1865	Succeeded by Robert Needham Philips
Political offices
Preceded by Benjamin Hawes	Under-Secretary of State for War and the Colonies; 1851–1852	Succeeded by The Earl of Desart
Preceded by The Earl of Desart	Under-Secretary of State for War and the Colonies; 1852–1854	Office abolished
New office	Under-Secretary of State for the Colonies; 1854–1855	Succeeded by John Ball
Preceded by Henry Roberts	Under-Secretary of State for War; 1855–1857	Succeeded by Sir John Ramsden, Bt
Preceded by Samuel Laing	Financial Secretary to the Treasury; 1860–1865	Succeeded by Hugh Childers
