= Wemyss Reid =

English newspaper editor and writer (1842–1905)

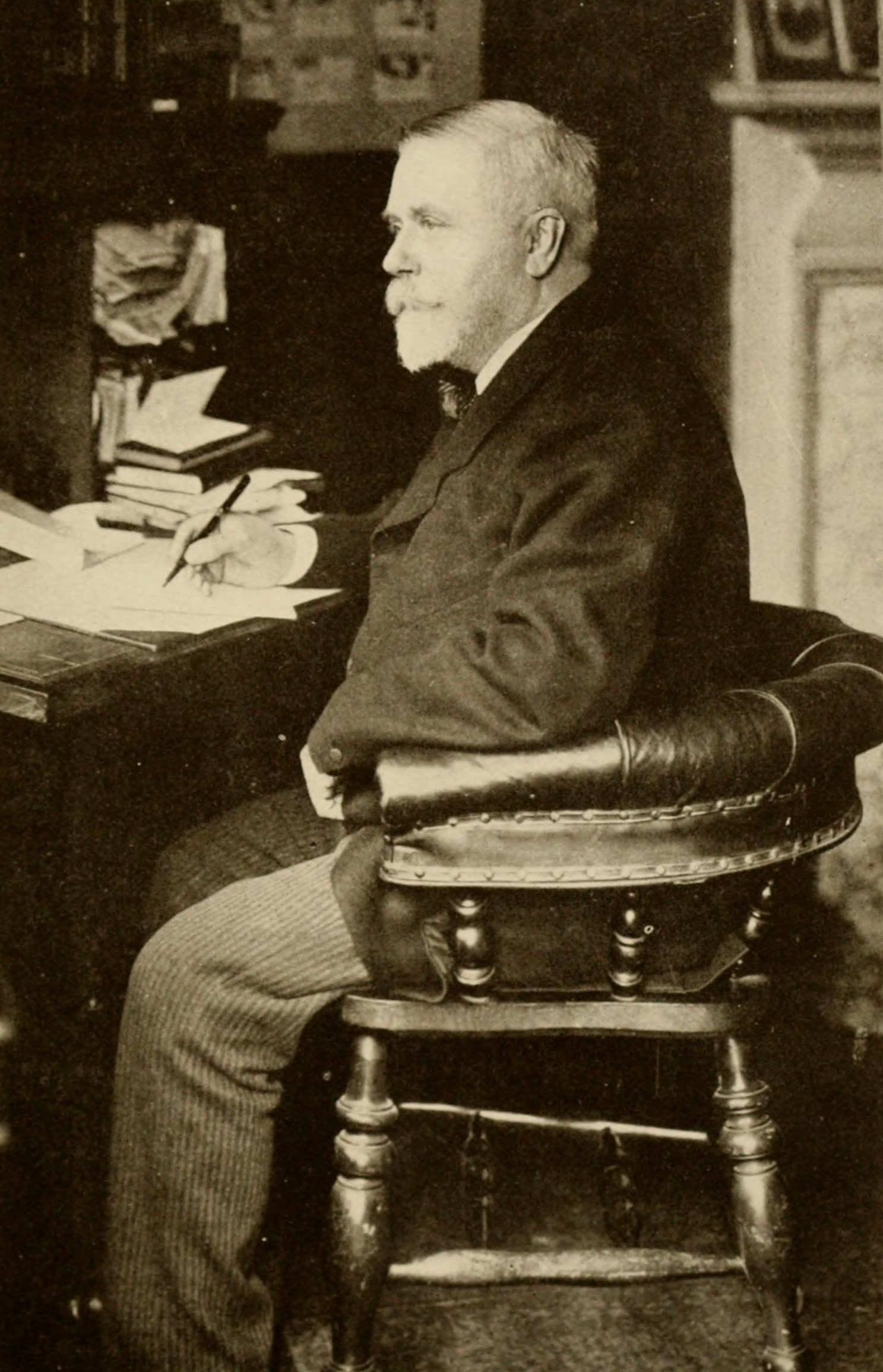
Sir Wemyss Reid.

Sir Thomas Wemyss Reid (29 March 1842 – 26 February 1905) was an English newspaper editor, novelist and biographer.

== Early life ==
Reid was born at Newcastle upon Tyne in 1842, the son of a Congregational minister

== Career ==
He became chief reporter on the Newcastle Journal aged 19. His reporting of the Hartley Colliery disaster (1862) established his reputation regionally, and two years later he was appointed editor of the Preston Guardian. He was made London correspondent of the Leeds Mercury in 1867, becoming its editor three years later. He reminisced of the changes he had made to the working methods of the Mercury:

When I was appointed editor of the Leeds Mercury I was told that I need never trouble to come to the office in the evening. If I looked in during the afternoon, and wrote my leader and notes, I would do all that was necessary. In those days, the provincial daily editor did not think of forming a judgement of his own on current events. When the pile of London dailies came in, he would read their leaders and base his own on them. In that way he was always a day behind London. I tried to change all that. I was down in my office each night, and I wrote my leaders on the telegraphic news as it came in . When Charles Dickens died, the news came in about eleven at night, and we went to press at one. I wrote a leader on Dickens's death, and that, I believe, was the only comment that appeared next day in any provincial daily on the matter. Other editors awoke to the fact that they, too, must no longer depend on London, and the old, easy-going times everywhere passed away.

He won the right for provincial newspapers to be admitted to the House of Commons press gallery and was (notes his entry in the ODNB) "the first to establish a provincial paper as a real rival to the London press, in the quality of its news and comment, and in its access to behind-the-scenes information". He held the editorship for seventeen years, until in 1887 he moved to London to become a director and general manager of Cassell & Co, the London publishers, a post he held until his death. From its start in 1890 to 1899, he was the editor-in-chief of the moderate Liberal magazine The Speaker.

He wrote a number of biographies, principally of W E Forster (a personal friend), and of Richard Monckton Milnes, 1st Baron Houghton, but also including one of Charlotte Brontë. He also wrote a book on Tunisia, Land of the Bey, and a number of popular novels, including Gladys Fane.

On his death the Yorkshire Post, the Leeds-based rival of the Mercury described him as an inveterate political wire-puller who had known more about the formation of William Ewart Gladstone's administration in 1892 that anybody else outside the official circles. He was knighted in 1894.

Reid died in 1905 and is buried in Brompton Cemetery, London. A former subordinate offered the following pen-portrait:

His style, if direct and clever, was common place, and his manner of speech retained more than a suggestion of Northern provincialism. But at every point and in every situation he had a personality that impressed. He was self-willed, self-assured, and if provoked eminently combative. It was not by suavity alone that he made his way. He could fight, and I know that in politics at any rate he was a tolerably good hater. He was afraid of nobody. Rather below the medium height, without any particular graces of person or of address, he could hold his own anywhere. He talked well and unaffectedly, and in his eyes, which had a curious scintillating brightness, there ever seemed to lurk a shrewd and humorous patronage of all men and things.

== Writings ==
Among his more permanent writings are:

- Politicians of To-day: A Series of Personal Scetches. London: Griffith and Farran. 1880. volume I, volume II - a compendium of short biographical character sketches of leading statesman and foreign premiers.
- The Land of the Bey (1882),
- Gladys Fane (1883),
- and Lives of William Edward Forster (1888), and Lords Houghton (1891), and Playfair (1899), and William Black, Novelist (1902).

He pronounced Heathcliff, from Wuthering Heights, "the greatest villain of literature." (From "A character study from "Wuthering Heights," The Nassau Literary Magazine (1848–1908); Apr 1879; 34, 9; American Periodicals Series Online).

== Sources ==
- Author and Bookinfo.com
