= Joseph Livesey =

British temperance activist (1794–1884)

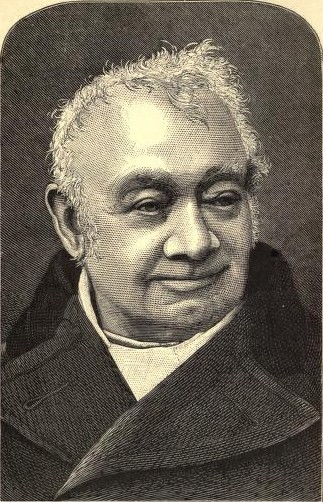
Joseph Livesey

Joseph William Livesey (5 March 1794 – 2 September 1884) was an English temperance campaigner, social reformer, local politician, writer, publisher, newspaper proprietor and philanthropist.

== Early life ==
Livesey was born on 5 March 1794 at Walton-le-Dale near Preston, Lancashire, the son of John Livesey, a cloth manufacturer, and Jennett (née Ainsley). His father had a warehouse and warping mill in the village and contracted work out to local weavers. However, both Joseph's parents died of tuberculosis when he was 7, and his grandfather, also Joseph Livesey, and uncle, Thomas Livesey, stepped in to run the business and look after the boy; they were not successful and the business had to be wound up after 3–4 years.

The family became weavers instead, practising their trade in a damp cellar, prone to flooding due to the nearby River Ribble. Shortly afterwards, his grandfather died and young Joseph had to take on the domestic duties as well. The hardships of his early life continued until after his marriage in 1815 to Jane Williams, when he moved to Preston and abandoned the trade of weaving for the business of cheese selling. He successfully continued this trade in Preston until his death.

== Business career and social activism ==
Livesey engaged energetically in local politics, filled many public posts, and was a leader in every kind of philanthropic effort, especially identifying with the teetotal movement. From January 1831 to December 1883, he published The Moral Reformer, a monthly magazine, priced at 6 pennies, in which he attempted to provide cheap and elevated reading. It became the Preston Temperance Advocate in January 1834, a monthly priced at 1 penny. This was the first temperance publication produced in England. Livesey ran it for 4 years, then transferred it to the British Temperance Association, where it became the British Temperance Advocate.

In January 1838, the Moral Reformer was revived and continued until February 1839. In 1841 Livesey engaged in agitation against the Corn Laws. From December 1841 until the repeal of the laws, he issued The Struggle, weekly, price a halfpenny. Its 235 editions, reaching up to 15,000 readers a week, proved valuable to the repealers.

In 1844 he established (with the help of his sons) the weekly Preston Guardian, which became the leading North Lancashire paper until 1859 when it was sold off. From August 1851 to May 1852 he issued the Teetotal Progressionist, and in 1867, commenced a penny monthly called the Staunch Teetotaller which ran for two years. In 1881, Livesey issued his memoirs under the title The autobiography of Joseph Livesey (Preston 1881; 2nd edition, London 1885). He also authored numerous tracts and lectures.

== Later years ==
Livesey had inherited a tendency to rheumatism from his mother, which was aggravated by having to work in a damp cellar in his early years; He also suffered from rheumatic fever throughout his life, which interrupted his literary work on several occasions. He maintained that doctors did not help him at all in his affliction, but credited hydropathic treatment with bringing him much-needed relief – even investing in the "hydro" at Bowness-on-Windermere. He was also an enthusiast for vegetarianism from 1867 after spending a year without meat.

Livesey died aged 90 on 2 September 1884, leaving a large family. His wife, Jane died before him in June 1869. In his will he left a provision that every household in Preston should receive a free copy of his Malt Liquor Lecture, in which he maintained that "there is more food in a pennyworth of bread than in a gallon of ale"; each of the 20,000 copies distributed was inscribed with the words, "he being dead yet speaketh".

A speech given by Livesey at the Oak Street Chapel in Manchester inspired John Cassell (founder of Cassell & Co.) to become a travelling temperance campaigner, and to "never let go the desire to be somebody and to do something from that moment".

== Bibliography ==
- Kirton, J. W. Dr. Guthrie. Father Mathew. Elihu Burritt. Joseph Livesey (Cassell & Co, 1885) p95 ff.
- Lee, Sidney, ed. (1893). "Livesey, Joseph" . Dictionary of National Biography. Vol. 33. London: Smith, Elder & Co. p. 380–1.
- Levitt, Ian. Joseph Livesey of Preston: Business, Temperance and Moral Reform (University of Central Lancashire, 1996).
- Livesey, Joseph. Moral reformer, and protestor against the vices, abuses, and corruptions of the age, volumes 1–3 (Sherwood & Co, 1831).
- Livesey, Joseph. Staunch teetotaler, nos 13–24 (1868).
- Livesey, Joseph. The life and teachings of Joseph Livesey, comprising his autobiography (National Temperance League's Depot, 1885).
- Pearse, John (Ed). The Life and Teachings of Joseph Livesey: Comprising His Autobiography (1885)
- Weston, James. Joseph Livesey: the story of his life, 1794–1884 (London: Partridge, 1884).
