= Alan Chorlton =

British politician (1874–1946)

- Born: 24 February 1874; Audenshaw, Lancashire, England
- Died: 6 October 1946 (aged 72)
- Education: Manchester Technical School
- Engineering career
- Discipline: Mechanical engineering
- Institutions: Mather and Platt's ironworks
- Employer: Hubbard Textile Printing Works
- Projects: Development of the internal combustion engine
- Significant design: High speed diesel engines
- Awards: Telford Premium medal

Alan Ernest Leofric Chorlton (24 February 1874 – 6 October 1946) was a British mechanical engineer and Conservative Party politician, and was involved in the development of the internal combustion engine.

== Biography ==
Chorlton was born om 24 February 1874, in Audenshaw. He was educated privately and at the mechanical engineering department of Manchester Technical School. He served an apprenticeship at Mather and Platt's ironworks in Salford, while studying part-time at Victoria University, Manchester.

At age 24, he became a consulting engineer to Hubbard Textile Printing Works, St Petersburg, Russia. He returned to England and the Salford Iron Works where he rose to become general works manager and was largely responsible for redesigning the Mather-Reynolds pump manufactured at the plant.

In 1913, he moved to Ruston and Hornsby at Lincoln. During the First World War he was appointed Deputy Controller of Aero Engines at the Ministry of Munitions. In 1917, he was awarded a Telford Premium medal by the Institution of Civil Engineers, and was made a Commander of the Order of the British Empire for his wartime services. He was also awarded the Cross of an Officer of the Order of the Crown of Italy.

From 1918 to 1928, he worked for William Beardmore and Company designing high speed diesel engines. These engines had various applications ranging from use in railcars to the R101 airship.

In 1929, he was nominated as Conservative candidate for the parliamentary constituency of Manchester Platting. Although unsuccessful on this occasion, two years later he was elected as Platting's Member of Parliament (MP), unseating the sitting Labour member, John Clynes. He was elected President of the Institute of Mechanical Engineers in 1933.

At the 1935 election, Chorlton was elected MP for Bury. In 1939, he announced he would not be standing for parliament again. He remained Bury's member of parliament until he stood down at the next election in 1945, which was delayed due to World War II.

A E L Chorlton retired from politics in 1945, and died on 6 October 1946, aged 72.

Parliament of the United Kingdom
Preceded by J. R. Clynes	Member of Parliament for Manchester Platting; 1931–1935	Succeeded by J. R. Clynes
Preceded by Charles Ainsworth	Member of Parliament for Bury; 1935–1945	Succeeded by Walter Fletcher
Professional and academic associations
Preceded by William Taylor	President of the Institution of Mechanical Engineers; 1933	Succeeded by Charles Day
