= J. R. Clynes =

British politician and trade unionist

The Right Honourable J. R. Clynes
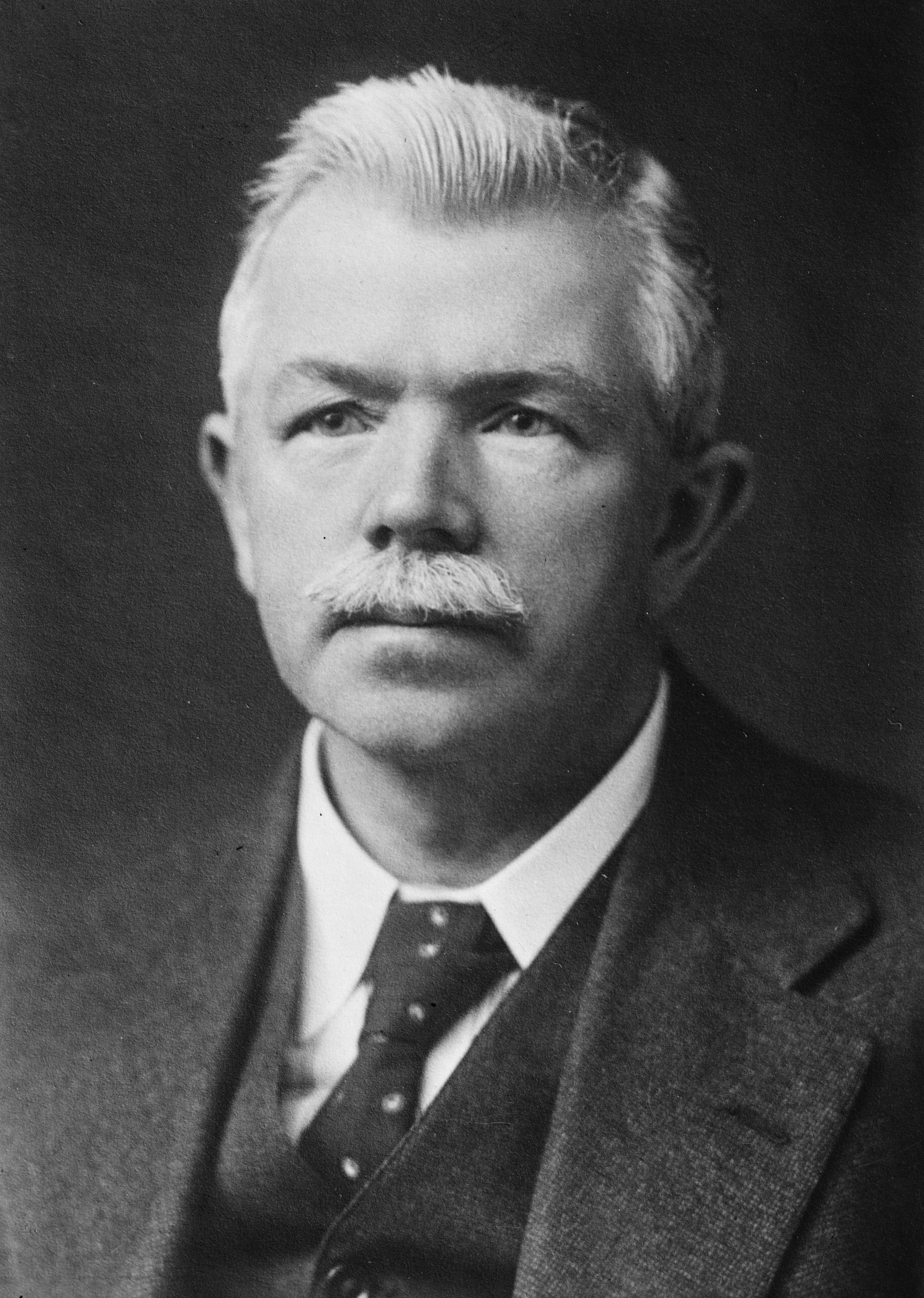

Leader of the Opposition
- In office 15 November 1922 – 21 November 1922
- Monarch: George V
- Prime Minister: Bonar Law
- Deputy: Stephen Walsh
- Preceded by: H. H. Asquith
- Succeeded by: Ramsay MacDonald

Leader of the Labour Party
- In office 14 February 1921 – 21 November 1922
- Deputy: Stephen Walsh
- Preceded by: William Adamson
- Succeeded by: Ramsay MacDonald

Deputy Leader of the Labour Party
- In office 21 November 1922 – 25 October 1932
- Leader: Ramsay MacDonald; Arthur Henderson
- Preceded by: Stephen Walsh
- Succeeded by: Clement Attlee
- In office 8 January 1919 – 14 February 1921
- Leader: William Adamson
- Preceded by: John Hodge
- Succeeded by: Stephen Walsh
- In office 15 February 1910 – 6 February 1911
- Leader: George Barnes
- Preceded by: George Barnes
- Succeeded by: William Brace
Ministerial positions
Home Secretary
In office 8 June 1929 – 26 August 1931
Prime Minister	Ramsay MacDonald
Preceded by	Sir William Joynson-Hicks
Succeeded by	Sir Herbert Samuel
Lord Privy Seal
In office 22 January 1924 – 6 November 1924
Prime Minister	Ramsay MacDonald
Preceded by	Robert Cecil
Succeeded by	James Gascoyne-Cecil
Minister of Food Control
In office 18 July 1918 – 10 January 1919
Prime Minister	David Lloyd George
Preceded by	David Alfred Thomas
Succeeded by	George Henry Roberts
Parliamentary Secretary of the Ministry of Food Control
In office 2 July 1917 – 18 July 1918
Prime Minister	David Lloyd George
Preceded by	Charles Bathurst
Succeeded by	Waldorf Astor

Member of Parliament for Manchester Platting Manchester North East (1906–1918)
- In office 14 November 1935 – 5 July 1945
- Preceded by: Alan Chorlton
- Succeeded by: Hugh Delargy
- In office 8 February 1906 – 27 October 1931
- Preceded by: James Fergusson
- Succeeded by: Alan Chorlton

Personal details
- Born: 27 March 1869 Oldham, Lancashire, England
- Died: 23 October 1949 (aged 80) London, England
- Party: Labour
- Spouse: Mary Elizabeth Harper (m. 1893)
- Children: 2

John Robert Clynes (27 March 1869 – 23 October 1949) was a British trade unionist and Labour Party politician. He was a Member of Parliament (MP) for 35 years, and as Leader of the Labour Party (1921–1922), led the party in its breakthrough at the 1922 general election.

He was the first English-born politician to serve as Leader of the Labour Party.

== Early life ==
The son of an Irish labourer named Patrick Clynes, he was born in Oldham, Lancashire, and began working in a local cotton mill when he was ten years old. Aged sixteen, he wrote a series of articles about child labour in the textile industry, and the following year he helped form the Piercers' Union. He was mainly self-educated, although he went to night-school after his day's work in the mill. His first book was a dictionary and then, by careful saving of coppers, he bought a Bible, William Shakespeare's plays, and Francis Bacon's essays. Later in life, he would amaze colleagues in meetings and in parliamentary debates by quoting verbatim from the Bible, Shakespeare, John Milton and John Ruskin. He married Mary Elizabeth Harper, a mill worker, in 1893.

== Trade union and political involvement ==
In 1892, Clynes became an organiser for the Lancashire Gasworkers' Union and came in contact with the Fabian Society. Having joined the Independent Labour Party, he attended the 1900 conference where the Labour Representation Committee was formed; this committee soon afterwards became the Labour Party.

Clynes stood for the new party in the 1906 general election and was elected to Parliament for Manchester North East, becoming one of Labour's bright stars. In 1910, he became the party's deputy chairman.

== Parliamentary career ==
During the First World War, Clynes was a supporter of British military involvement (in which he differed from Ramsay MacDonald), and, in 1917, became Parliamentary Secretary of the Ministry of Food Control in the Lloyd George coalition government. The next year, he was appointed Minister of Food Control and, at the 1918 general election, he was returned to Parliament for the Manchester Platting constituency.

In August 1917, three months before the Balfour Declaration, the Labour Party issued a statement in support of a Jewish state in Palestine. Clynes spoke in favour of a Jewish state.

Clynes became leader of the party in 1921 and led it through its major breakthrough in the 1922 general election. Before that election, Labour only had fifty-two seats in Parliament but, as a result of the election, Labour's total number of seats rose to 142. He was held in considerable respect and affection in the Labour Party and, although lacking the charisma of MacDonald, was a wily operator who believed all resources available should be used to advance the material of the working classes.

MacDonald had resigned as Labour leader in 1914, due to his wartime pacifism, and at the 1918 general election, he lost his seat. He did not return to the House of Commons for another four years. By that stage, MacDonald's pacifism had been forgiven. When the occupant of the Labour leadership had to be decided on through a vote of Labour parliamentarians, MacDonald narrowly defeated Clynes. Being half-Irish himself, Clynes was a critic of government policy towards the Irish population in the years after 1918, and attacked 'a recurring system of coercion' which had left Ireland "more angry and embittered . . . than ever'

== Governmental office ==
When MacDonald became Prime Minister, he made Clynes the party's leader in the Commons until the government was defeated in 1924. During the second MacDonald government of 1929–31, Clynes served as Home Secretary. In that role, Clynes gained literary prominence when he explained in the Commons his refusal to grant a visa to the Russian revolutionary Leon Trotsky, then living in exile in Turkey, who had been invited by the Independent Labour Party to give a lecture in Britain. Clynes received a scathing rebuttal of his conception of the right to asylum by Trotsky, in the last chapter of his autobiography My Life titled "The planet without visa".

In 1931, Clynes sided with Arthur Henderson and George Lansbury, against MacDonald's support for austerity measures to deal with the Great Depression. Clynes split with MacDonald when the latter left Labour to form a National Government. At the 1931 general election, Clynes was one of the notable casualties, losing his Manchester Platting seat. Nevertheless, he regained the constituency four years later in 1935, and then remained in the House of Commons, following the wartime suspension of party politics; until his retirement ten years later, at the 1945 general election.

== Retirement and death ==
After retiring, Clynes was living in very straitened circumstances, with no other income than trade union pension of £6 per week. This pension debarred him from the Commons Ex-Members Fund. Doctors' and nursing fees in respect of his invalid wife had hit him heavily. MPs opened a fund to help and raised about £1,000. Thus, after a lifetime spent in advancing the material conditions of the people, he died in relative poverty in October 1949. His wife died a month later.

== Honours ==
- He was sworn in as a member of the Privy Council of the United Kingdom in 1918, giving him the honorific title "The Right Honourable" for life.
- He was awarded the Freedom of the Borough of Oldham on 9 January 1946.
- He received the Honorary degree of Doctor of Civil Law (DCL) from the University of Durham and the University of Oxford.
- John Clynes Court, a social housing development in Putney, south west London, is named after him.

Parliament of the United Kingdom
Preceded by Sir James Fergusson	Member of Parliament for Manchester North East; 1906–1918	Constituency abolished
New constituency	Member of Parliament for Manchester Platting; 1918–1931	Succeeded by Alan Chorlton
Preceded by Alan Chorlton	Member of Parliament for Manchester Platting; 1935–1945	Succeeded by Hugh James Delargy
Political offices
Preceded by The Lord Rhondda	Minister of Food Control; 1918–1919	Succeeded by George Henry Roberts
Preceded by The Viscount Cecil of Chelwood	Lord Privy Seal; 1924	Succeeded by The Marquess of Salisbury
Preceded by Sir William Joynson-Hicks	Home Secretary; 1929–1931	Succeeded by Sir Herbert Samuel
Trade union offices
Preceded by New position	Lancashire District Secretary of the National Union of General Workers; 1896–1917	Succeeded by Fleming Eccles
Preceded by Herbert Skinner and John Wadsworth	Trades Union Congress representative to the American Federation of Labour; 1909; With: Alfred Henry Gill	Succeeded by William Brace and Ben Turner
Preceded by J. E. Smith	President of the National Union of General Workers; 1912–1924	Succeeded by Position abolished
Preceded by New position	President of the National Union of General and Municipal Workers; 1924–1937	Succeeded by Fred Marshall as Chair of the Executive
Party political offices
Preceded by Ben Turner	Trades councils representative on the National Executive Committee of the Labour Party; 1904–1909	Succeeded by William Barefoot
Preceded by William Adamson	Chair of the Labour Party; 1921–1922	Succeeded by Ramsay MacDonald
