= John Haslam =

John Haslam may refer to:

- John Haslam (politician)
- John Haslam (physician)

== See also ==
- John Haslem (disambiguation)
