= Bury (constituency) =

Parliamentary constituency in the United Kingdom, 1832–1950

- Former borough constituency for the House of Commons
- County: Lancashire (now Greater Manchester)
- Major settlements: Bury

1832–1950
- Seats: One
- Created from: Lancashire
- Replaced by: Bury & Radcliffe

Bury was a borough constituency centred on the town of Bury in Lancashire. It returned one Member of Parliament (MP) to the House of Commons of the Parliament of the United Kingdom.

The constituency was created for the 1832 general election, and abolished for the 1950 general election, when it was largely replaced by the new constituency of Bury & Radcliffe.

== Boundaries ==
1885-1918: The existing parliamentary borough, and so much of the municipal borough of Bury as was not already included in the parliamentary borough.

1918-1950: The county borough of Bury and the urban district of Tottington.

== Members of Parliament ==
Election	Member	Party
1832	Richard Walker	Whig-Radical
1852	Frederick Peel	Peelite
1857	Robert Needham Philips	Radical
1859	Frederick Peel	Liberal
1865	Robert Needham Philips	Liberal
1885	Sir Henry James	Liberal
1886	Sir Henry James	Liberal Unionist
1895	James Kenyon	Conservative
1902 by-election	Sir George Toulmin	Liberal
1918	Charles Ainsworth	Conservative
1935	Alan Chorlton	Conservative
1945	Walter Fletcher	Conservative
1950	constituency abolished: see Bury & Radcliffe	

== Elections ==
1830s – 1840s – 1850s – 1860s – 1870s – 1880s – 1890s – 1900s – 1910s – 1920s – 1930s –1940s – Back to Top

=== Elections in the 1830s ===
General election 1832: Bury
Party	Candidate	Votes	%	±%
Whig	Richard Walker	306	66.7	
Radical	Edmund Grundy	153	33.3	
Majority		153	33.4	
Turnout		459	85.8	
Registered electors		535		
Whig win (new seat)				

General election 1835: Bury
Party	Candidate	Votes	%	±%
Whig	Richard Walker	Unopposed		
Registered electors		526		
Whig hold				

General election 1837: Bury
Party	Candidate	Votes	%	±%
Whig	Richard Walker	251	57.8	N/A
Radical	James Paul Cobbett	96	22.1	N/A
Conservative	Robert Spankie	87	20.0	New
Majority		155	35.7	N/A
Turnout		434	68.1	N/A
Registered electors		637		
Whig hold		Swing	N/A	

=== Elections in the 1840s ===
General election 1841: Bury
Party	Candidate	Votes	%	±%
Whig	Richard Walker	325	53.0	−4.8
Conservative	Henry Hardman	288	47.0	+27.0
Majority		37	6.0	−29.7
Turnout		613	79.8	+11.7
Registered electors		768		
Whig hold		Swing	−15.9	

General election 1847: Bury
Party	Candidate	Votes	%	±%
Whig	Richard Walker	Unopposed		
Registered electors		868		
Whig hold				

=== Elections in the 1850s ===
General election 1852: Bury
Party	Candidate	Votes	%	±%
Peelite	Frederick Peel	472	53.5	N/A
Whig	Adam Haldane-Duncan	410	46.5	N/A
Majority		62	7.0	N/A
Turnout		882	92.0	N/A
Registered electors		959		
Peelite gain from Whig		Swing	N/A	

General election 1857: Bury
Party	Candidate	Votes	%	±%
Radical	Robert Needham Philips	565	51.6	N/A
Peelite	Frederick Peel	530	48.4	−5.1
Majority		35	3.2	N/A
Turnout		1,095	89.9	−2.1
Registered electors		1,218		
Radical gain from Peelite		Swing		

General election 1859: Bury
Party	Candidate	Votes	%	±%
Liberal	Frederick Peel	641	57.3	+8.9
Liberal	Thomas Barnes	478	42.7	N/A
Majority		163	14.6	+11.4
Turnout		1,119	86.8	−3.1
Registered electors		1,218		
Liberal hold		Swing	N/A	

=== Elections in the 1860s ===
General election 1865: Bury
Party	Candidate	Votes	%	±%
Liberal	Robert Needham Philips	595	51.0	N/A
Liberal	Frederick Peel	572	49.0	−8.3
Majority		23	2.0	−12.6
Turnout		1,167	86.3	−0.5
Registered electors		1,352		
Liberal hold		Swing	N/A	

General election 1868: Bury
Party	Candidate	Votes	%	±%
Liberal	Robert Needham Philips	2,830	55.6	+4.6
Conservative	George Cadogan	2,264	44.4	New
Majority		566	11.2	+9.2
Turnout		5,094	91.2	+4.9
Registered electors		5,587		
Liberal hold		Swing	N/A	

=== Elections in the 1870s ===
General election 1874: Bury
Party	Candidate	Votes	%	±%
Liberal	Robert Needham Philips	3,016	54.7	−0.9
Conservative	Oliver Ormerod Walker	2,500	45.3	+0.9
Majority		516	9.4	−1.8
Turnout		5,516	88.5	−2.7
Registered electors		6,236		
Liberal hold		Swing	−0.9	

=== Elections in the 1880s ===
General election 1880: Bury
Party	Candidate	Votes	%	±%
Liberal	Robert Needham Philips	Unopposed		
Registered electors		6,835		
Liberal hold				

Lawson

General election 1885: Bury
Party	Candidate	Votes	%	±%
Liberal	Henry James	3,976	51.2	N/A
Conservative	John Lawson	3,787	48.8	New
Majority		189	2.4	N/A
Turnout		7,763	94.5	N/A
Registered electors		8,214		
Liberal hold		Swing	N/A	

General election 1886: Bury
Party	Candidate	Votes	%	±%
Liberal Unionist	Henry James	Unopposed		
Liberal Unionist gain from Liberal				

=== Elections in the 1890s ===
General election 1892: Bury
Party	Candidate	Votes	%	±%
Liberal Unionist	Henry James	4,070	55.7	N/A
Liberal	John Parks	3,241	44.3	New
Majority		829	11.4	N/A
Turnout		7,311	93.4	N/A
Registered electors		7,831		
Liberal Unionist hold				

Cheetham

General election 1895: Bury
Party	Candidate	Votes	%	±%
Conservative	James Kenyon	3,890	54.8	−0.9
Liberal	John Frederick Cheetham	3,215	45.2	+0.9
Majority		675	9.6	−1.8
Turnout		7,105	89.0	−4.4
Registered electors		7,986		
Conservative hold		Swing	-0.9	

=== Elections in the 1900s ===
General election 1900: Bury
Party	Candidate	Votes	%	±%
Conservative	James Kenyon	4,132	55.7	+0.9
Liberal	George Toulmin	3,283	44.3	−0.9
Majority		849	11.4	+1.8
Turnout		7,415	86.4	−2.6
Registered electors		8,581		
Conservative hold		Swing	+0.9	

Toulmin

1902 Bury by-election
Party	Candidate	Votes	%	±%
Liberal	George Toulmin	4,213	52.6	+8.3
Liberal Unionist	Harry Levy-Lawson	3,799	47.4	−8.3
Majority		414	5.2	N/A
Turnout		8,012	91.2	+4.8
Registered electors		8,786		
Liberal gain from Conservative		Swing	+8.3	

General election 1906: Bury
Party	Candidate	Votes	%	±%
Liberal	George Toulmin	4,626	56.9	+12.6
Conservative	Reginald Jaffray Lucas	3,499	43.1	−12.6
Majority		1,127	13.8	N/A
Turnout		8,125	89.6	+3.2
Registered electors		9,068		
Liberal gain from Conservative		Swing	+12.6	

=== Elections in the 1910s ===
General election January 1910: Bury
Party	Candidate	Votes	%	±%
Liberal	George Toulmin	4,866	53.3	−3.6
Conservative	Edwin Leach Hartley	4,258	46.7	+3.6
Majority		608	6.6	−7.2
Turnout		9,124	94.5	+4.9
Liberal hold		Swing	-3.6	

General election December 1910: Bury
Party	Candidate	Votes	%	±%
Liberal	George Toulmin	4,509	51.5	−1.8
Conservative	Edwin Leach Hartley	4,254	48.5	+1.8
Majority		255	3.0	−3.6
Turnout		8,763	90.7	−3.8
Liberal hold		Swing	+1.8	

General Election 1914–15:

Another General Election was required to take place before the end of 1915. The political parties had been making preparations for an election to take place and by July 1914, the following candidates had been selected;

- Liberal: George Toulmin
- Unionist:

General election 1918: Bury
Party		Candidate	Votes	%	±%
	Unionist	Charles Ainsworth	10,043	45.9	−2.6
C	Liberal	George Toulmin	6,862	31.4	−20.1
	Labour	Harry Wallace	4,973	22.7	New
Majority			3,181	14.5	N/A
Turnout			21,878	67.0	−23.7
Registered electors			32,666		
	Unionist gain from Liberal		Swing	+8.7	
C indicates candidate endorsed by the coalition government.

=== Elections in the 1920s ===
General election 1922: Bury
Party	Candidate	Votes	%	±%
Unionist	Charles Ainsworth	10,830	41.2	−4.7
Labour	Harry Wallace	9,643	36.7	+14.0
Liberal	William Alfred Lewins	5,795	22.1	−9.3
Majority		1,187	4.5	−10.0
Turnout		26,268	81.3	+14.3
Registered electors		32,304		
Unionist hold		Swing	−9.4	

General election 1923: Bury
Party	Candidate	Votes	%	±%
Unionist	Charles Ainsworth	10,680	40.3	−0.9
Labour	Harry Wallace	9,568	36.1	−0.6
Liberal	James Duckworth	6,251	23.6	+1.5
Majority		1,112	4.2	−0.3
Turnout		26,499	80.8	−0.5
Registered electors		32,803		
Unionist hold		Swing	−0.2	

General election 1924: Bury
Party	Candidate	Votes	%	±%
Unionist	Charles Ainsworth	13,382	46.9	+6.6
Labour	Harry Wallace	10,286	36.1	0.0
Liberal	James Duckworth	4,847	17.0	−6.6
Majority		3,096	10.8	+6.6
Turnout		28,515	86.5	+5.7
Registered electors		32,982		
Unionist hold		Swing	+3.3	

General election 1929: Bury
Party	Candidate	Votes	%	±%
Unionist	Charles Ainsworth	14,845	42.1	−4.8
Labour	James Bell	13,175	37.5	+1.4
Liberal	Clifford Stanley Ickringill	7,160	20.4	+3.4
Majority		1,670	4.6	−6.2
Turnout		35,180	81.4	−5.1
Registered electors		43,216		
Unionist hold		Swing	−3.1	

=== Elections in the 1930s ===
General election 1931: Bury
Party	Candidate	Votes	%	±%
Conservative	Charles Ainsworth	24,975	70.3	+28.2
Labour	James Bell	10,532	29.7	−7.8
Majority		14,443	40.6	+36.0
Turnout		35,507	81.6	+0.2
Conservative hold		Swing	+17.9	

General election 1935: Bury
Party	Candidate	Votes	%	±%
Conservative	Alan Chorlton	18,425	49.4	−20.9
Labour	Edith Summerskill	12,845	34.4	+4.7
Liberal	Donald Johnson	6,065	16.2	New
Majority		5,580	15.0	−25.6
Turnout		37,335	83.3	+1.7
Conservative hold		Swing	-12.8	

=== Elections in the 1940s ===
General Election 1939–40 Another General Election was required to take place before the end of 1940. The political parties had been making preparations for an election to take place from 1939 and by the end of this year, the following candidates had been selected;

- Labour: William Harvey Moore

General election 1945: Bury
Party	Candidate	Votes	%	±%
Conservative	Walter Fletcher	14,012	39.9	−9.5
Labour	Sydney Hand	13,902	39.6	+5.2
Liberal	Arthur Walter James	7,211	20.5	+4.3
Majority		110	0.3	−14.7
Turnout		35,125	78.2	−5.1
Conservative hold		Swing	-7.3	
