= Manchester Platting =

Parliamentary constituency in the United Kingdom, 1918–1950

- Former borough constituency for the House of Commons

1918–1950
- Seats: one
- Created from: Manchester North
- Replaced by: Manchester Cheetham and Manchester Clayton

Manchester Platting was a parliamentary constituency in Manchester. It returned one Member of Parliament (MP) to the House of Commons of the Parliament of the United Kingdom, elected by the first past the post system.

== History ==
The constituency was created as a result of the Report of the Boundary Commission in 1917, when it was recommended to be called "Manchester Collyhurst". However, when the Representation of the People Bill to give effect to the commission's recommendations was debated in Parliament, the Government accepted an amendment to change the name to Platting. The new constituency came into effect at the 1918 general election. It was abolished for the 1950 general election.

== Boundaries ==
Although Parliament changed the name proposed by the Boundary Commission, they kept the boundaries as recommended. The constituency was defined as the Collyhurst, Harpurhey and Miles Platting municipal wards of the County Borough of Manchester, together with the part of the St Michael's municipal ward which was not included in the Exchange division. The St Michael's ward was divided along the Rochdale Road, the small area to the south-west including the High Street area being excluded.

== Members of Parliament ==
Election	Member	Party
1918	J. R. Clynes	Labour
1931	Alan Chorlton	Conservative
1935	J. R. Clynes	Labour
1945	Hugh Delargy	Labour
1950	constituency abolished	

== Election results ==
=== Election in the 1910s ===
General election 1918: Manchester Platting
Party	Candidate	Votes	%	±%
Labour	J. R. Clynes	Unopposed		
Labour win (new seat)				

=== Elections in the 1920s ===
General election 1922: Manchester Platting
Party	Candidate	Votes	%	±%
Labour	J. R. Clynes	15,683	48.5	N/A
Unionist	Frank Henry Holmes	14,814	45.8	New
Liberal	William Ramage	1,847	5.7	New
Majority		869	2.7	N/A
Turnout		32,344	81.8	N/A
Registered electors		39,559		
Labour hold		Swing	N/A	

General election 1923: Manchester Platting
Party	Candidate	Votes	%	±%
Labour	J. R. Clynes	17,078	54.8	+6.3
Unionist	Frank Henry Holmes	14,099	45.2	−0.6
Majority		2,979	9.6	+6.9
Turnout		31,178	78.1	−3.7
Registered electors		39,898		
Labour hold		Swing	+3.5	

General election 1924: Manchester Platting
Party	Candidate	Votes	%	±%
Labour	J. R. Clynes	17,233	49.2	−5.6
Unionist	Frank Henry Holmes	16,228	46.4	+1.2
Liberal	E Baker	1,538	4.4	New
Majority		1,005	2.8	−6.8
Turnout		34,999	86.1	+8.0
Registered electors		40,629		
Labour hold		Swing	−3.4	

General election 1929: Manchester Platting
Party	Candidate	Votes	%	±%
Labour	J. R. Clynes	22,969	57.9	+8.7
Unionist	Alan Chorlton	16,323	41.1	−5.3
Communist	Joe Vaughan	401	1.0	New
Majority		6,646	16.8	+14.0
Turnout		39,693	80.8	−5.3
Registered electors		49,153		
Labour hold		Swing	+6.8	

=== Elections in the 1930s ===
General election 1931: Manchester, Platting
Party	Candidate	Votes	%	±%
Conservative	Alan Chorlton	23,588	57.0	+15.9
Labour	J. R. Clynes	17,798	43.0	−14.9
Majority		5,790	14.0	N/A
Turnout		41,386	82.6	+1.8
Registered electors		50,081		
Conservative gain from Labour		Swing	+15.5	

General election 1935: Manchester, Platting
Party	Candidate	Votes	%	±%
Labour	J. R. Clynes	18,352	51.9	+8.9
Conservative	James Warden Stansfield	17,015	48.1	−8.9
Majority		1,337	3.8	N/A
Turnout		35,367	76.5	−6.1
Registered electors		46,234		
Labour gain from Conservative		Swing	+8.9	

=== Election in the 1940s ===
General election 1945: Manchester, Platting
Party	Candidate	Votes	%	±%
Labour	Hugh Delargy	16,427	63.9	+12.0
Conservative	Wilfrid Sugden	9,262	36.1	−12.0
Majority		7,165	27.8	+24.0
Turnout		25,689	72.6	−2.9
Registered electors		35,403		
Labour hold		Swing	+12.0	

== Sources ==
- Craig, F. W. S. (1983) [1969]. British parliamentary election results 1918-1949 (3rd ed.). Chichester: Parliamentary Research Services. ISBN 0-900178-06-X.
- Leigh Rayment's Historical List of MPs – Constituencies beginning with "P" (part 1)
