= Charles Ainsworth (politician) =

British politician

Ainsworth in February 1923

Colonel Charles Ainsworth (25 February 1874 – 10 April 1956) was a British businessman and Conservative politician.

He was born at Ingol, near Preston, Lancashire. Following a private education, he entered the family textile business of Charles Ainsworth and Company Limited, of which he eventually became chairman and managing director. He married Clara Middlemost in 1902, and they had three children.

In the First World War he served in the Middle East as an officer in the Lancashire Fusiliers. Following demobilisation in 1918, he was to maintain his connection with the regiment, becoming the commanding officer of the 5th (Territorial) Battalion from 1928 to 1933, and being awarded the brevet rank of colonel.

At the 1918 general election he was elected MP for Bury, and held the seat until 1935. In 1931 he was elected to the Grand Council of the Primrose League.

Apart from his business and political interests he was master of the Holcombe Hunt from 1928 to 1933, and a member of the Church Assembly.

He died at his home in Milton-under-Wychwood, Oxfordshire, in 1956, aged 82.

Parliament of the United Kingdom
Preceded by Sir George Toulmin	Member of Parliament for Bury; 1918 – 1935	Succeeded by Alan Chorlton
