= Forest of Dean by-election =

Forest of Dean by-election may refer to:

- 1887 Forest of Dean by-election
- 1911 Forest of Dean by-election
- 1912 Forest of Dean by-election
- 1925 Forest of Dean by-election
