= Wignall =

Wignall may refer to:

People

- Anne Wignall (1912–1982), English socialite and author
- Frank George Wignall Pogson married into Doria-Pamphili-Landi, a princely Roman family of Genoese extraction
- Frank Wignall (born 1939), retired English international footballer
- Harrison James Wignall or Harrison Slater, American writer, pianist, and educator
- James Wignall (1856–1925), M.P. for Forest of Dean
- Judita Wignall, founder of Halo Friendlies, an all girl pop-punk band from Long Beach, CA
- Maurice Wignall (born 1976), Jamaican hurdling athlete
- Ruth Wignall (née Dodsworth), Welsh television presenter for ITV Wales
- Steve Wignall (born 1954), English former professional football manager and player
- Trevor Wignall (1881–1958), Welsh author and sportswriter

Geography

- Wignall Nunataks, two snow-covered nunataks northwest of Mount Starlight in the Athos Range, Prince Charles Mountains, Antarctica
- Wignall Peak, small peak just west of Mount McCarthy in the eastern part of the Porthos Range, Prince Charles Mountains, Antarctica
