= A. A. Purcell =

British trade unionist and Labour politician (1872–1936)

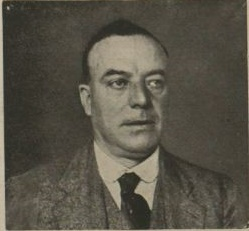
- Purcell in 1920

Member of Parliament for Coventry
- In office 6 December 1923 – 29 October 1924

Member of Parliament for Forest of Dean
- In office 14 July 1925 – 30 May 1929

Personal details
- Born: 3 November 1872
- Died: 24 December 1935 (aged 63)
- Party: Labour Party

Albert Arthur "Alf" Purcell (3 November 1872, Hoxton – 24 December 1935) was a British trade unionist and Labour Party politician. He was a founding member of the Communist Party of Great Britain and later President of the International Federation of Trade Unions from 1924 to 1928 and sat in the House of Commons during two separate periods between 1923 and 1929.

== Early life ==
The son of a French polisher, Purcell lived in East London until he moved with his family to Yorkshire at an early age. He was educated at elementary school in Keighley but at the age of nine started work part-time in a local woolen mill. The family returned to Hoxton in 1890, and he was a taken on as an apprentice French polisher. He joined the London French Polishers' Union in 1891. In 1893, he joined the Legal Eight Hours and International Labour League. By 1898, he was its general secretary. It was later incorporated into the National Amalgamated Furnishing Trades Association. About the same time, he also joined the South Salford Branch of the Social Democratic Federation.

== Political career ==
In 1907, he was elected to Salford Borough Council, serving for six years. In 1911, he became the assistant general secretary of the union, and in 1917, he was elected as its general secretary. He also served as treasurer of the Federation of Engineering and Shipbuilding Trades for three years and then as president.

He attended the Foundation Congress of the Communist Party of Great Britain and was responsible for the resolution proposing the foundation of the Communist Party of Great Britain.

In 1920, he visited Belfast as part of a Trades Union Congress delegation enquiring into the workplace expulsions. He was elected to the General Council of the TUC in 1921 and became President of the TUC in 1924. In 1925, he chaired a TUC delegation to the Soviet Union. Leon Trotsky was very critical of the political choices of the Stalinist bureaucracy toward Purcell.

At the December 1923 general election, Purcell was elected as the Member of Parliament (MP) for Coventry by defeating the sitting Conservative MP, Sir Edward Manville. However, at the October 1924 general election, he was defeated by Manville.

Purcell was out of Parliament for only nine months. James Wignall, the Labour MP for the Forest of Dean division of Gloucestershire, died in June 1925, and at the resulting by-election on 14 July, Purcell won the seat. He did not defend that seat at the 1929 general election and stood instead in Manchester Moss Side. He lost to the sitting Conservative MP, Sir Gerald Berkeley Hurst.

Purcell died in December 1935.

Parliament of the United Kingdom
Preceded by Sir Edward Manville	Member of Parliament for Coventry; 1923–1924	Succeeded by Archibald Boyd-Carpenter
Preceded by James Wignall	Member of Parliament for Forest of Dean; 1925–1929	Succeeded by David Vaughan
Trade union offices
Preceded by Joe Williams	President of the Trades Union Congress; 1924	Succeeded by Alonzo Swales
Preceded by Charlie Cramp and Alonzo Swales	Trades Union Congress representative to the American Federation of Labour; 1925; With: Ben Smith	Succeeded by John Bromley and George Hicks
Preceded by J. H. Thomas	President of the International Federation of Trade Unions; 1924 – 1927	Succeeded by Walter Citrine
Preceded by William R. Mellor	Secretary of the Manchester and Salford Trades Council; 1929–1935	Succeeded by Jack Munro
