= Frank Butler (British sportswriter) =

British sportswriter

Frank James Butler OBE (16 September 1916 – 2 January 2006) was a British sportswriter and author. He was one of Fleet Street's best-known and longest-serving sports editors, retiring from that position at the News of the World in 1982, after 22 years' service. Though Butler covered all sports, boxing was always his favourite.

His father, James Butler, was boxing correspondent at the Daily Herald, and introduced Frank to the sport at an early age. As a child Frank watched such stars as Augie Ratner, Mickey Walker and Georges Carpentier at their training camps, and saw the fights of leading British boxers such as Ted "Kid" Lewis, Ernie Rice and Harry Mason while perched between two press seats – one occupied by his father, and the other, as he remembered it, by either Charlie Rose or Fred Dartnell – themselves leading boxing correspondents. Before he was 10, Butler had watched innumerable boxing matches at notable venues such as the National Sporting Club, Premierland, the Blackfriars Ring, the Royal Albert Hall and Olympia.

At 16 Butler joined the Daily Express as a junior member of the Sports Department, and at 18 was reporting boxing and football under his own name. He was encouraged and helped enormously by Trevor Wignall, the newspaper's main sports columnist at the time, and also by the Express Editor Arthur Christiansen. Butler soon became the newspaper's chief boxing writer and columnist, and in 1941 – at the age of 24 – was appointed sports editor at the Sunday Express (the youngest person to hold that position).

In 1949 the News of The World hired Butler as a sports columnist on a salary dubbed 'the highest transfer fee in Fleet Street'; and he became the newspaper's sports editor in 1960.

In 1954 he was a founder member of the Boxing Writers' Club, and later became its chairman. In 1984 he was made an administrative steward of the British Boxing Board of Control, and after retiring in 1997, was elected honorary steward.

He was the author of at least four books on the subject of boxing. His first, The Fight Game, was co-written with his father and published in 1954.

He was appointed an Officer of the Order of the British Empire (OBE) in the 1981 New Year Honours.
