= Hands off our Forest =

British protest group

- Abbreviation: HOOF
- Formation: 2010
- Type: Campaign group
- Headquarters: Ellwood Lodge; Little Drybrook; Coleford; GL16 8PL
- Chairman: Richard Daniels
- Website: http://www.handsoffourforest.org

Hands off our Forest (HOOF) is a campaign group formed in 2010 to fight the UK Government's proposed sale of publicly owned land in the Forest of Dean. 'Hands off our Forest' describe themselves as a broad alliance of groups and individuals.

== Historical context ==
The Forest of Dean has a long history of struggle between commoners, the Crown and private landowners. The Dean and New Forests Act 1808 resulted in large areas of the forest being enclosed, depriving commoners of their customary privileges, and led directly to the Dean Forest Riots of 1831.

In 1981, Parliament passed the Forestry Act 1981, amending an earlier act of 1967 to allow the sale of land managed by the Forestry Commission. Following a sustained campaign, the Forest of Dean was specifically exempted from the act. The Public Bodies Bill, introduced to Parliament in October 2010, proposed to amend the Forestry Act 1967 (c. 10), potentially repealing the Forest of Dean exemption.

== Background to the HOOF campaign ==
Towards the end of October, 2010, newspaper reports emerged, claiming that the government was planning to sell off public forests in England. Following discussions with Dean Forest Voice, Baroness Royall and other individuals, Forest of Dean newspaper, The Forester, responded by announcing the formation of a "Hands off our Forest" campaign. The reports were confirmed in late October, when the Minister for Agriculture and Food, James Paice MP, wrote to MPs to explain the government's reasons for including powers to modernise forestry legislation in the Public Bodies Bill, which had recently been introduced to Parliament. His letter confirmed the government was "exploring new ownership" options for forestry land currently managed by the Forestry Commission; which include large areas of the Forest of Dean.

=== National reaction ===
According to The Guardian, "the news [was] met with near-universal disgust and shock". The same newspaper also quoted Caroline Lucas MP, leader of the Green Party, as saying it was an "unforgivable act of environmental vandalism". An online petition opposing the sale, titled Save Our Forests has so far received more than 500,000 signatories.

=== Local reaction ===
The member of Parliament for the Forest of Dean, Mark Harper, defended the proposals, describing them as an 'exciting opportunity for community ownership'. He also said James Paice's letter assured him everything the public holds dear about the Forest of Dean would be protected under any new ownership. However, the proposals were widely criticised by residents within his constituency, by the local press and by politicians with connections to the Forest of Dean, most notably Baroness Royall, Leader of the Opposition in the House of Lords. She described Mark Harper as 'fundamentally wrong' and his views on the subject as 'utter nonsense'. Concern within the local community resulted in a number of Forest of Dean organisations joining to form an alliance, adopting 'Hands off our Forest' (HOOF) as its name.

== Aims and strategy ==
HOOF's website describes its aim as being 'to keep the Forest [of Dean] as it is – publicly owned and publicly run by the Forestry Commission' and its strategy as being 'that government should respect the 1981 Act regarding the Forest of Dean and give it, and the other Heritage Forests, full protection from disposal'.

== Public consultation ==
On 27 January 2011, the Government published a consultation document. Despite the Public Bodies Bill having been in the House of Lords for three months, this made it clear for the first time that the Government was not planning, or no longer planned, to sell the majority of the Forest of Dean and instead planned to "transfer the ownership or management of the large heritage sites on the public forest estate to a charity or charities, via a trust arrangement or lease.........at no cost to the new owner".

This was claimed as a victory by some campaigners, although HOOF rejected the handover plan, deciding to stick to its aim of gaining an exemption for the Forest of Dean from the Public Bodies Bill; thus ensuring it stayed in public ownership and protected from any future sale or transfer.

Having waited for the consultation document to be published, Mark Harper held a public meeting in Coleford, on 4 February. Despite being given only 2 days notice, 400 people turned up, but the venue chosen could only accommodate around 150 and the rest had to stay outside. He had to be rescued by police.

== Campaign victory ==
The campaign celebrated a partial victory on 17 February 2011 when, speaking in the House of Commons, the Secretary of State for the Environment, Caroline Spelman, told MPs the government had "got this one wrong". She announced the consultation process had been halted and that the Government would remove the forestry clauses from the Public Bodies Bill. An independent panel would also be set up to consult on the issue of the future direction of forestry and woodland, and will report to the government in the autumn of 2011. However, HOOF pledged to fight on until it had confirmation the Government had abandoned its privatisation policy, and called for representation on the panel. The group also said it would campaign against cuts within the Forestry Commission and woodland within the Forest of Dean not protected in the 1981 Act.

== Timeline of events ==
Hands off our Forest public meeting, December 2010.

- 23–24 October 2010. National newspapers report that the Government is planning to sell off public forests.
- 28 October. Forest of Dean weekly newspaper, The Forester, launches a 'Hands off our Forest' campaign.
  On the same day, the Public Bodies Bill is introduced to The House of Lords by Lord Taylor of Holbeach.
- 31 October. The Minister for Agriculture and Food, James Paice MP, writes to MPs, confirming that the Government is "exploring new ownership" options for publicly owned forests in England.
- 1 November. Dean Forest Voice co-ordinates the formation of a steering group.
- 6 November. With HOOF still not solidly formed, Forest of Dean poet and freeminer Dave Harvey arranges a preliminary rally at the Speech House. A group of about 50 people gather in a marquee.
- 9 November. The Public Bodies Bill receives its second reading in the House of Lords. It includes a clauses which could enable the Secretary of State to amend the Forestry Act 1967 and order the disposal of Forestry Commission land in England.
- 10 November. Hands off our Forest (HOOF) is officially adopted as the campaign name by the inaugural meeting of an alliance of several pre-existing local organisations, including 'Dean Forest Voice', 'Friends of the Forest', the Forest of Dean Local History Society, forestry trade unions, Play Gloucestershire, The Forest & Wye Valley Review, the Forester newspaper, Freeminers’ and Commoners’ associations. A committee is elected.
- Throughout November and early December, HOOF campaigns at events around the Forest of Dean, distributes "Forest of Dean - not for sale" boards, coordinates letter-writing campaigns and organises a petition, which gains 5,000 signatures within its first month.
  Mark Harper MP announces in early December that he will meet with protesters in January 2011, when the Government is due to publish a white paper on forestry and canvasses constituents in Coalway, asking their opinions on "an opportunity to own our Forest".
- 23 November. The Public Bodies Bill reaches Committee stage.
- 24 November. Minister James Paice concedes to a House of Lords EU Select Committee's forestry inquiry that, under EU rules, forests could be sold to foreign interests and that, while he does not want forests to be woodchipped by biofuel companies, he could offer no guarantees they wouldn't be.
- 9 December. The Forest of Dean District Council agrees to back the HOOF campaign and to send a delegation to Parliament to put pressure on the Prime Minister, MPs and Lords against any sell-off.
- 10 December. About 500 people attend a public meeting, organised by Cinderford Town Council and backed by HOOF, held at the Miners Welfare Hall in Cinderford, to hear passionate speeches from Baroness Royall, Richard Daniels (HOOF chairman) and members of the audience. The Government's forest privatisation clause in the Public Bodies Bill was condemned but Baroness Royall stated her belief that it was unlikely the clause could be overturned. Efforts would therefore concentrate on achieving an exemption for the Forest of Dean, on the grounds that it was different from other forests in that, for historical reasons, it had very few actual rights of way but instead had customary privileges making it much more vulnerable to having the footpaths and bridleways closed.
- 15 December. HOOF members join a national rally outside the Houses of Parliament, organised by national campaign group Save Our Forests and the Public and Commercial Services Union.
- 16 December. It is reported that HOOF has backing from Coleford and Cinderford Town Councils and Drybrook Parish Council, while Lydney Town Council and West Dean Parish Council voted unanimously to express their objection to any sale. Actor Richard Wilson, the Bishop of Gloucester, the Bishop of Guildford, Baroness Fritchie and former Chancellor of the Exchequer Denis Healey, whose wife Edna Healey was from Coleford, all endorse the HOOF campaign.
- 20 December. Environmentalist Jonathon Porritt backs the HOOF campaign in his blog.
- 23 December. More campaign endorsements are reported, including author Bill Bryson, Lydbrook Parish Council, Forest in Transition (part of the Transition Towns movement), children's author Shoo Rayner. and the Bishop of Gloucester.
- 3 January 2011. 3000 people attend a HOOF rally at Speech House Meadow, including a procession through the Cyril Hart Arboretum led by the Forest of Dean Brass Band. Speeches are heard from Jonathon Porritt, Baroness Jan Royall, The Bishop of Guildford and others.
- 17 January. A deputation organised by Forest of Dean District Council meet Lords at Westminster.
- 23 January. Over 120 cyclists attend a HOOF cycle rally at Cannop Cycle Centre.
- 27 January. The Government published its consultation document. See the Public consultation section.
- 31 January. HOOF steering group unanimously decide to reject the handover plan and stick with its aim of gaining an exemption from the Public Bodies Bill.
- 4 February. Mark Harper holds a public meeting to discuss the proposals. See the Public consultation section.
- 11 February. The Government announces it has put the sale of 15% of the public forest estate (which it planned to sell to the highest bidder as part of its comprehensive spending review) on hold while it looks at strengthening access and biodiversity protection for the woodlands. Some of those earmarked for sale before 2014 are within the Forest of Dean, but outside the legally protected area of forest.
- 17 February. The Government announces plans to transfer state-owned forests to the private sector have been abandoned. See the Campaign victory section.
- 19 February. Baroness Jan Royall ceremoniously removes a sign and yellow ribbon from an oak, but warns "this is not necessarily the end" of the battle.
- 26 February. HOOF hosts a summit of local and national public forest campaign groups in the Forest of Dean. As a result, the Forest Campaigns Network is formed to fight the next stage of the battle with local and national groups in a united front against taking any of the public forest estate out of public hands.
- 20 March. HOOF plans events, such as cycling and barbecue, as part of a national Celebrate Our Forests day, co-ordinated by the FCN and 38 Degrees. People taking part will be encouraged to wear something yellow or to display a yellow ribbon.

== Related art, film and music ==
Hands off our Forest public meeting, December 2010.

The campaign inspired a wide range of artwork, including creative banners, newspaper cartoons and children's artwork - some instigated by local schools. A protest artwork by Doug Eaton filled the window of The Gallery in Cinderford. The fire sculpture Big BENt (a wooden effigy of Big Ben by Phil Bews) became a national icon after being burnt at the 3 January HOOF rally and featured in The Guardian. The rally poster, by Helen Sandford, was also an historic and notable work of art. Filmmaker Woodrow "Woody" Morris was one of several people who made their own short films of the rally and several filmmakers are (as of March 2011) in the process of making films inspired by the campaign, including Mike Thomas, who chronicled many events including Mark Harper's February 2011 public meeting.

The protest singer, Billy Bragg, gave permission for his British adaptation of Woody Guthrie's This Land Is Your Land to be used in the campaign, and is included on a HOOF benefit CD called HANDS OFF, which also features new protest songs directly inspired by the campaign by musicians who performed at the 3 January rally. HOOF's website is building an online exhibition of photographs and accounts of the campaign. In addition, Tom Cousins has voluntarily painted a range of large wall murals on the gable ends of Forest of Dean residents' homes and offices.

== See also ==
- The Forestry Commission
- Mark Harper MP (Forest of Dean)
