= Janet Lane-Claypon =

Physician and epidemiologist

Janet Lane-Claypon JP
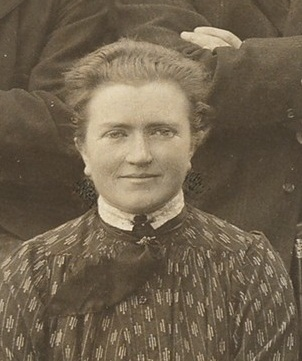
- Dr. Lane-Claypon in 1907
- Born: Janet Elizabeth Claypon; 3 February 1877; Boston, Lincolnshire, England
- Died: 17 July 1967 (aged 90); Seaford, East Sussex, England
- Spouse: Sir Edward Rodolph Forber (m. 1929; died 1960)
- Medical career
- Profession: Physician
- Research: Epidemiology

Janet Elizabeth Lane-Claypon, Lady Forber (3 February 1877 – 17 July 1967) was an English physician. She was one of the founders of the science of epidemiology, pioneering the use of cohort studies and case-control studies.

== Early life and education ==
Lane-Claypon was born Janet Elizabeth Claypon in 1877 into an affluent family, in Boston, Lincolnshire, the daughter of William Ward Lane-Claypon, a banker and former first-class cricketer, and Edith (née Stow). Her uncle C. G. Lane was also a first-class cricketer. A few weeks after her birth, her father changed the family name to Lane-Claypon by royal license.

She was privately educated and entered the London School of Medicine for Women in 1898, winning numerous honors and fellowships. During her training, the British Medical Society awarded Lane-Claypon a research scholarship—the first time it had ever bestowed the honour on a woman. She earned both an MD and DSc (making her an early example of the "Doctor-doctor" phenomenon).

== Career ==
Immediately after her education, Lane-Claypon began research at University College, London. During the first phase of her career, Dr. Lane-Claypon's research focused on female reproductive physiology—specifically the structure and function of the ovary.

In 1912, Lane-Claypon published a ground-breaking study of two cohorts (groups) of babies, fed cow's milk and breast milk respectively. Lane-Claypon found that those babies fed breast milk gained more weight, and she used statistical methods to show that the difference was unlikely to occur by coincidence alone. She also investigated whether something other than the type of milk could account for the difference, an effect known as confounding.

Having demonstrated the power of cohort studies, Lane-Claypon went on to develop another key type of epidemiological investigation, the case-control study. Lane-Claypon tracked down 500 women with a history of breast cancer – the "cases" – and compared them with 500 women who were free of the disease but otherwise broadly similar, known as "controls". She showed that breast cancer risk increased for childless women, women who married later than average, and women who did not breast feed. The overall breast cancer risk decreased according to the number of children. For all cases, rapid treatment held the key to survival among women with breast cancer. This study eventually led to the incorporation of risk tables and life expectancy in cancer treatment.

In 1916, Dr. Lane-Claypon was named the dean of King's College for Women. However, departmental politics and pressures led her to resign her post and return to research, where she remained until the end of her career. In total, Lane-Claypon published three books and 30 scientific papers. In 1920, she was appointed a Justice of the Peace for the County of London.

== Personal life ==
In 1929, Lane-Claypon married civil servant Sir Edward Rodolph Forber (1878–1960). She was his second wife. Sir Edward held several prominent positions, including Deputy Secretary of the Ministry of Health. Lane-Claypon's final paper was published under her married name, and she essentially retired following her marriage, not uncommon for a woman of her class in this era. The couple lived in Seaford, East Sussex.

Lady Forber died in 1967, aged 90.
