= 2023 Forest of Dean District Council election =

2023 English local election

- 4 May 2023

All 38 seats to Forest of Dean District Council 20 seats needed for a majority

	First party	Second party	Third party
Leader	Jackie Dale		Matt Bishop
Party	Green	Independent	Labour
Last election	6 seats, 21.6%	15 seats, 25.8%	5 seats, 16.4%
Seats before	7	20 (Note: Of the 20 independent councillors prior to the election, seven formed the "Progressive Independents Group" (which included council leader Tim Gwilliam), six formed the "Independent Group", four formed the "Independent Alliance Group", and three formed "Independent Group 2".)	3
Seats won	15	11	5
Seat change	▲9	▼4	Steady
Popular vote	11,621	9,960	3,244
Percentage	28.8%	24.7%	8.0%
Swing	▲7.2%	▼0.9%	▼8.4%
	Fourth party	Fifth party
Leader	Harry Ives	Gill Moseley
Party	Conservative	Liberal Democrats
Last election	10 seats, 30.0%	2 seats, 5.2%
Seats before	6	2
Seats won	4	3
Seat change	▼6	▲1
Popular vote	11,258	4,242
Percentage	27.9%	10.5%
Swing	▼2.4%	▲5.3%
- Winner of each seat at the 2023 Forest of Dean District Council election
Leader before election
Tim Gwilliam
Independent
No overall control
Leader after election
Mark Topping
Green
No overall control

The 2023 Forest of Dean District Council election was held on 4 May 2023 to elect members to the Forest of Dean District Council in Gloucestershire, England. This was part of the 2023 United Kingdom local elections.

Following publication of the English devolution white paper on 16 December 2024, the Forest of Dean District Council will be required to merge with neighbouring authorities in Gloucestershire. No further elections are expected beyond 2023.

== Overview ==
Prior to the election the majority of the seats on the council were held by independent councillors, with 20 of the 38 councillors not representing a political party. The independents did not act as one political group, instead sitting as four different groups. Since 2017 the council had been led by Tim Gwilliam of the "Progressive Independents" group.

Following the election, the council consisted of fifteen Green, eleven Independent, five Labour, four Conservative and three Liberal Democrat councillors. Of the wards where more than 3 candidates stood, Labour councillor Di Martin and newly elected Labour councillor Matt Bishop achieved the highest share individually where they received 34% and 32% of the vote respectively in Cinderford East. At the subsequent annual council meeting on 25 May 2023, Green councillor Mark Topping was appointed Leader of the Council with support from Labour on a confidence and supply basis. Former Labour group leader Di Martin was appointed as chair of the council at the same meeting.

=== Election result ===
2023 Forest of Dean District Council election
Party	Candidates	Seats	Gains	Losses	Net gain/loss	Seats %	Votes %	Votes	+/−
Green	21	15	9	0	▲9	39.5	28.8	11,621	+7.2
Independent	27	11	2	6	▼4	28.9	24.7	9,960	–0.9
Labour	7	5	1	1	Steady	13.2	8.0	3,244	–8.4
Conservative	38	4	0	6	▼6	10.5	27.9	11,258	–2.1
Liberal Democrats	8	3	1	0	▲1	7.9	10.5	4,242	+5.3

== Ward results ==
The results for each ward were as follows, with an asterisk (*) indicating a sitting councillor standing for re-election.

=== Berry Hill ===
Berry Hill (2 seats)
Party	Candidate	Votes	%	±%
Independent	Tim Gwilliam*	571	44.2	−16.0
Independent	Jamie Elsmore*	560	43.4	N/A
Green	Stephen Yeates	391	30.3	+16.8
Green	Richard Henson	282	21.8	+1.0
Independent	Nigel Bluett	209	16.2	−10.2
Conservative	Clive Dunning	202	15.6	−10.8
Conservative	Valerie Nurden	140	10.8	−10.7
Independent	Scott Baine	58	4.5	N/A
Turnout		1,295	34.55	
Registered electors		3,748		
Rejected ballots		4	0.3	
Independent hold		Swing		
Independent hold		Swing		

=== Bream ===
Bream (2 seats)
Party	Candidate	Votes	%	±%
Green	Alison Bruce	537	44.5	+25.1
Green	Beth Llewellyn	377	31.3	+13.6
Labour	Barry Faulkner	288	23.9	−1.1
Independent	Alan Grant	283	23.5	N/A
Independent	Paul Hiett *	283	23.5	−9.4
Conservative	Rob Whittaker	213	17.7	+2.9
Conservative	Sarah Price	149	12.4	+0.6
Independent	Emma Gleave	81	6.7	N/A
Turnout		1,210	32.61	
Registered electors		3,711		
Rejected ballots		4	0.3	
Green gain from Independent		Swing		
Green hold		Swing		

=== Cinderford East ===
Cinderford East (2 seats)
Party	Candidate	Votes	%	±%
Labour	Di Martin*	458	60.5	+6.1
Labour	Matt Bishop	421	55.6	+0.2
Conservative	Alan Bensted	163	21.5	+0.7
Independent	Jeremy Charlton-Wright	157	20.7	−8.5
Conservative	Freda Gittos	137	18.1	+2.0
Turnout		765	22.47	
Registered electors		3,404		
Rejected ballots		8	1.0	
Labour hold		Swing		
Labour hold		Swing		

=== Cinderford West ===
Cinderford West (2 seats)
Party	Candidate	Votes	%	±%
Labour	Jacob Sanders	367	49.8	+12.1
Independent	Mark Turner*	359	48.7	+7.2
Independent	Lynn Sterry*	299	40.6	+2.9
Conservative	Andrew Plummer	131	17.8	−0.7
Conservative	John Clissold	104	14.1	−0.7
Turnout		741	23.73	
Registered electors		3,123		
Rejected ballots		4	0.5	
Labour hold		Swing		
Independent hold		Swing		

=== Coleford ===
Coleford (3 seats)
Party	Candidate	Votes	%	±%
Independent	Clive Elsmore*	643	40.2	−6.1
Labour	Patrick Kyne	619	38.7	+17.6
Independent	Ian Whitburn*	577	36.1	+4.5
Conservative	Carole Allaway-Martin *	530	33.1	+3.3
Green	Rachel Lane	526	32.9	+5.6
Liberal Democrats	Peter Taylor	364	22.8	+5.4
Conservative	Denis Riley	288	18.0	−2.5
Conservative	Joseph Price	226	14.1	−10.6
Turnout		1,602	26.44	
Registered electors		6,060		
Rejected ballots		3	0.2	
Independent hold		Swing		
Labour gain from Conservative		Swing		
Independent hold		Swing		

=== Dymock ===
Dymock (1 seat)
Party	Candidate	Votes	%	±%
Liberal Democrats	Gill Kilmurray	431	62.5	N/A
Conservative	Eli Heathfield	259	37.5	−27.8
Turnout		698	42.41	
Registered electors		1,646		
Rejected ballots		8	1.1	
Liberal Democrats gain from Conservative		Swing		

=== Hartpury & Redmarley ===
Hartpury & Redmarley (2 seats)
Party	Candidate	Votes	%	±%
Independent	Philip Burford*	759	52.6	−6.8
Conservative	Clayton Williams	658	45.6	+9.3
Green	John Turvill	424	29.4	±0.0
Green	David Gregory	337	23.4	N/A
Conservative	Geoff Woodyatt	287	19.9	−18.3
Turnout		1,446	40.49	
Registered electors		3,571		
Rejected ballots		3	0.2	
Independent hold		Swing		
Conservative hold		Swing		

=== Longhope & Huntley ===
Longhope & Huntley (2 seats)
Party	Candidate	Votes	%	±%
Independent	John Francis	465	35.2	N/A
Green	David Tradgett	449	34.0	−9.0
Independent	Alan Wood	387	29.3	N/A
Independent	Jeremy Rebbeck	340	25.7	N/A
Conservative	Gary Nicholas	316	23.9	−27.4
Conservative	Venk Shenoi	259	19.6	−26.5
Turnout		1,323	40.68	
Registered electors		3,252		
Rejected ballots		1	0.1	
Independent gain from Conservative		Swing		
Green gain from Conservative		Swing		

=== Lydbrook ===
Lydbrook (1 seat)
Party	Candidate	Votes	%	±%
Green	Sid Phelps*	502	85.5	+18.1
Conservative	Rosie Ker	85	14.5	+10.6
Turnout		590	32.96	
Registered electors		1,790		
Rejected ballots		3	0.5	
Green hold		Swing		

=== Lydney East ===
Lydney East (3 seats)
Party	Candidate	Votes	%	±%
Conservative	Alan Preest*	448	38.1	−1.4
Independent	James Bevan*	441	37.5	+1.7
Green	Andrew McDermid	440	37.4	+19.1
Independent	Claire Vaughan *	439	37.4	+7.5
Labour	Andy Hewlett	390	33.2	+10.5
Conservative	Julie Kirkham	344	29.3	−0.6
Conservative	Elliott James	314	26.7	+10.6
Turnout		1,178	23.15	
Registered electors		5,089		
Rejected ballots		3	0.3	
Conservative hold		Swing		
Independent hold		Swing		
Green gain from Conservative		Swing		

=== Lydney North ===
Lydney North (1 seat)
Party	Candidate	Votes	%	±%
Conservative	Harry Ives*	483	76.3	+32.6
Green	Jane Carr	150	23.7	+8.8
Turnout		635	37.46	
Registered electors		1,695		
Rejected ballots		2	0.3	
Conservative hold		Swing		

=== Lydney West & Aylburton ===
Lydney West & Aylburton (1 seat)
Party	Candidate	Votes	%	±%
Green	Mark Topping*	512	77.6	+36.7
Conservative	Will Windsor-Clive	148	22.4	−16.8
Turnout		667	34.17	
Registered electors		1,952		
Rejected ballots		7	1.0	
Green hold		Swing		

=== Mitcheldean Ruardean & Drybrook ===
Mitcheldean Ruardean & Drybrook (3 seats)
Party	Candidate	Votes	%	±%
Green	Jackie Fraser*	958	49.0	+16.6
Green	Trevor Roach	816	41.7	+19.3
Labour	Shaun Stammers	701	35.9	+13.0
Independent	Thom Forester *	673	34.4	+4.6
Independent	Andrew Gardiner *	542	27.7	−7.9
Conservative	Guy Hollier	461	23.6	+2.0
Conservative	Tracy Heathfield	275	14.1	−5.0
Conservative	Pam Plummer	256	13.1	−3.5
Liberal Democrats	Stewart Bean	200	10.2	−8.0
Turnout		1,956	33.93	
Registered electors		5,765		
Rejected ballots		1	0.1	
Green gain from Independent		Swing		
Green gain from Independent		Swing		
Labour hold		Swing		

=== Newent & Taynton ===
Newent & Taynton (3 seats)
Party	Candidate	Votes	%	±%
Liberal Democrats	Gill Moseley*	1,044	64.0	
Independent	Julia Gooch*	894	54.8	
Liberal Democrats	Julie Hudson	865	53.1	
Conservative	Jonathon Beeston	498	30.6	
Liberal Democrats	Martin Roper	366	22.5	
Conservative	Nick Winter	273	16.7	
Conservative	Maria Edey	258	15.8	
Turnout		1,639	30.46	
Registered electors		5,381		
Rejected ballots		9	0.5	
Liberal Democrats hold		Swing		
Independent hold		Swing		
Liberal Democrats hold		Swing		

=== Newland & Sling ===
Newland & Sling (1 seat)
Party	Candidate	Votes	%	±%
Green	David Wheeler*	409	69.4	+26.6
Conservative	Pam Woodyatt	180	30.6	+6.2
Turnout		601	30.45	
Registered electors		1,974		
Rejected ballots		12	2.0	
Green hold		Swing		

=== Newnham ===
Newnham (2 seats)
Party	Candidate	Votes	%	±%
Green	Richard Burton	763	56.7	−0.8
Green	Andy Moore	744	55.3	N/A
Conservative	Carol Thomas	411	30.5	−9.9
Conservative	Kevin Oversby	299	22.2	−12.9
Independent	Richard Ashton	247	18.4	N/A
Turnout		1,351	34.63	
Registered electors		3,901		
Rejected ballots		5	0.4	
Green hold		Swing		
Green gain from Conservative		Swing		

=== Pillowell ===
Pillowell (1 seat)
Party	Candidate	Votes	%	±%
Green	Jackie Dale	493	77.3	+39.0
Conservative	Alison Taylor	145	22.7	+3.4
Turnout		644	37.16	
Registered electors		1,733		
Rejected ballots		6	0.9	
Green hold		Swing		

=== Ruspidge ===
Ruspidge (1 seat)
Party	Candidate	Votes	%	±%
Independent	Bernie O'Neill*	230	50.9	−8.5
Liberal Democrats	James Green	126	27.9	N/A
Conservative	Judy Parsons	96	21.2	−19.4
Turnout		457	25.10	
Registered electors		1,821		
Rejected ballots		5	1.1	
Independent gain from Labour		Swing		

=== St Briavels ===
St Briavels (1 seat)
Party	Candidate	Votes	%	±%
Green	Chris McFarling*	650	74.5	−6.4
Conservative	Roger Stuart	188	21.6	+2.5
Independent	Rose Collins	34	3.9	N/A
Turnout		877	45.61	
Registered electors		1,923		
Rejected ballots		5	0.6	
Green hold		Swing		

=== Tidenham ===
Tidenham (3 seats)
Party	Candidate	Votes	%	±%
Green	Johnathan Lane	1,034	48.3	+29.2
Green	Adrian Birch	977	45.6	+19.6
Conservative	Nick Evans*	884	41.3	+6.0
Liberal Democrats	Jan Koning	846	39.5	+20.9
Conservative	Julian McGhee-Sumner	661	30.9	+8.6
Conservative	Gareth Hughes	557	26.0	+4.4
Independent	Maria Edwards *	381	17.8	−16.5
Independent	Gethyn Davies	371	17.3	−3.0
Turnout		2,150	38.74	
Registered electors		5,550		
Rejected ballots		9	0.4	
Green gain from Independent		Swing		
Green gain from Independent		Swing		
Conservative hold		Swing		

=== Westbury-on-Severn ===
Westbury-on-Severn (1 seat)
Party	Candidate	Votes	%	±%
Independent	Simon Phelps*	557	87.4	+25.5
Conservative	Suzanne Bowen	80	12.6	−6.8
Turnout		642	39.29	
Registered electors		1,634		
Rejected ballots		5	0.8	
Independent hold		Swing		

== By-elections ==
=== Cinderford East ===
The by-election was triggered by the resignation of Labour councillor Matt Bishop after he was elected MP for the Forest of Dean at the 2024 general election.

Cinderford East By-Election 1 May 2025
Party	Candidate	Votes	%	±%
Reform	Stuart Graham	480	44.4	N/A
Labour	Emma Louise Phillips	344	31.8	–27.1
Conservative	Pamela Kay Plummer	112	10.4	–10.6
Independent	Jeremy Paul Charlton-Wright	74	6.8	–13.4
Independent	Tom Forester	71	6.6	N/A
Majority		136	12.6	N/A
Turnout		1,086	31.7	+9.2
Reform gain from Labour				

=== Newent and Taynton ===
The by-election was triggered by the resignation of Liberal Democrat councillor Julie Hudson.

Newent and Taynton By-Election 1 May 2025
Party	Candidate	Votes	%	±%
Conservative	Jonathan Edward Beeston	704	38.7	+18.3
Liberal Democrats	Tony Clifford-Winters	561	30.8	–12.1
Green	Tim Rickard	430	23.6	N/A
Labour	Graham David Mountcastle	124	6.8	N/A
Majority		143	7.9	N/A
Turnout		1,887	33.3	+1.8
Conservative gain from Liberal Democrats				
