= David Vaughan (British politician) =

David John Vaughan (15 November 1873 – 23 November 1938) was a British Labour Party politician. He sat in the House of Commons from 1929 to 1931.

Vaughan unsuccessfully contested Bristol South at three successive general elections, in 1922, 1923 and 1924.

He finally won a seat at the 1929 general election, when he was elected as the Member of Parliament (MP) for the Forest of Dean division of Gloucestershire, replacing the sitting Labour MP Albert Arthur Purcell who did not defend the seat. However, at the next general election, in 1931, Vaughan was defeated by Dr. John Vigers Worthington, standing as a National Labour candidate.

Parliament of the United Kingdom
Preceded by A. A. Purcell	Member of Parliament for Forest of Dean; 1929–1931	Succeeded by John Worthington
