= James Edmunds (British politician) =

Welsh trade unionist and politician

James Ewart Edmunds (5 May 1882 – 1962) was a Welsh trade unionist and politician.

Born in Gilwern in Breconshire, Edmunds' parents were both teachers. Educated at Howard Gardens Secondary School and at University College Cardiff, he qualified as a teacher in 1903 and worked at schools in Cardiff. Edmunds was also involved in trade unionism, and became secretary of Cardiff Trades Council in 1911, serving until 1922. In 1913, he was elected as a Labour Party member of the Cardiff Board of Guardians, and he stood unsuccessfully in Cardiff Central at the 1918, 1922 and 1923 general elections.

In 1920, Edmunds quit teaching to take up a post as the Newport District Secretary of the Transport and General Workers' Union. He was elected as President of Cardiff Trades Council in 1924, serving for four years, and in 1926, he was appointed as a magistrate. He stood for Cardiff East at the 1929 general election and finally won a seat, but he lost it at the following election, in 1931.

Parliament of the United Kingdom
Preceded by Clement Kinloch-Cooke	Member of Parliament for Cardiff East; 1929–1931	Succeeded by Owen Temple-Morris
