= Thomas Blake (MP) =

English politician

Thomas Blake (9 November 1825 – 31 March 1901) was an English Liberal politician.

Blake was the youngest son of William Blake, of Ross on Wye. He was chairman of the Ross School Board, to which he was elected four times.

Blake stood for parliament unsuccessfully in Herefordshire at the 1868. He was elected as Member of Parliament (MP) for Leominster at a by-election in February 1876, and held the seat until his defeat in 1880. He was elected on 4 December 1885 at the general election as MP for the new Forest of Dean constituency, and was re-elected on 2 July 1886, but resigned from the House of Commons on 15 July 1887. He was replaced at a by-election the same month by another Liberal G B Samuelson, and appears to have not stood again. Blake died at the age of 75.

Blake married firstly Susan Ellen Gordon in 1844. He married secondly Anne Kay in 1874.

Parliament of the United Kingdom
Preceded by Richard Arkwright	Member of Parliament for Leominster; 1876–1880	Succeeded by James Rankin
New constituency see West Gloucestershire	Member of Parliament for Forest of Dean; 1885–1887	Succeeded by Godfrey Samuelson
