= Mark Harper =

British politician (born 1970)

The Right Honourable The Lord Harper PC
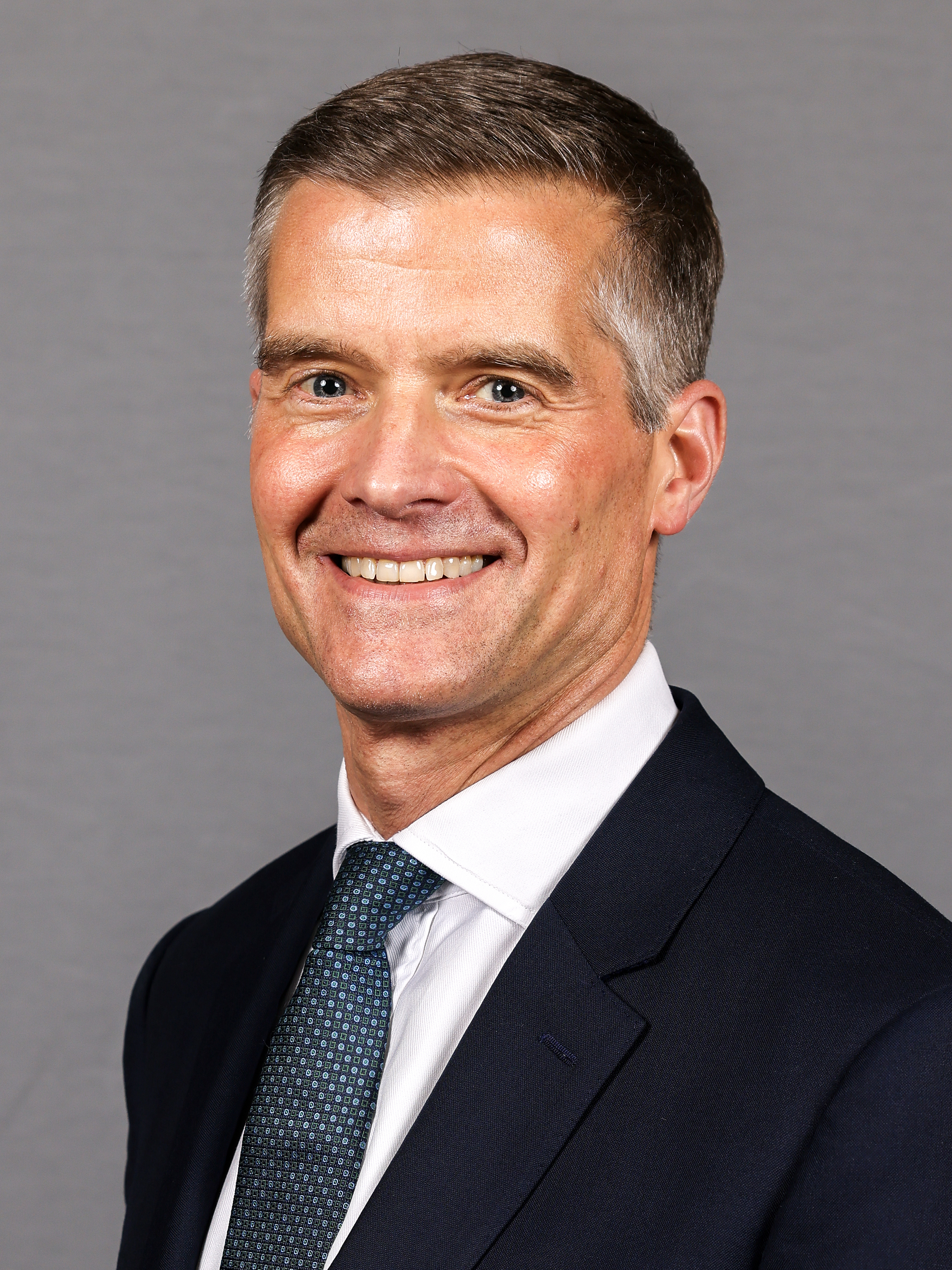
- Official portrait, 2022

Secretary of State for Transport
- In office 25 October 2022 – 5 July 2024
- Prime Minister: Rishi Sunak
- Preceded by: Anne-Marie Trevelyan
- Succeeded by: Louise Haigh

Government Chief Whip in the House of Commons Parliamentary Secretary to the Treasury
- In office 9 May 2015 – 14 July 2016
- Prime Minister: David Cameron
- Preceded by: Michael Gove
- Succeeded by: Gavin Williamson

Minister of State for Disabled People
- In office 15 July 2014 – 8 May 2015
- Prime Minister: David Cameron
- Preceded by: Mike Penning
- Succeeded by: Justin Tomlinson

Minister of State for Immigration
- In office 4 September 2012 – 8 February 2014
- Prime Minister: David Cameron
- Preceded by: Damian Green
- Succeeded by: James Brokenshire

Parliamentary Secretary for Political and Constitutional Reform
- In office 11 May 2010 – 4 September 2012
- Prime Minister: David Cameron
- Preceded by: Office established
- Succeeded by: Chloe Smith

Shadow Minister for Disabled People
- In office 3 July 2007 – 11 May 2010
- Leader: David Cameron
- Preceded by: Jeremy Hunt
- Succeeded by: Margaret Curran

Member of the House of Lords
- Lord Temporal
- Life peerage 12 May 2025

Member of Parliament for Forest of Dean
- In office 5 May 2005 – 30 May 2024
- Preceded by: Diana Organ
- Succeeded by: Matt Bishop

Personal details
- Born: Mark James Harper; 26 February 1970 (age 56) Swindon, Wiltshire, England
- Party: Conservative
- Spouse: Margaret Harper
- Education: Brasenose College, Oxford

Mark James Harper, Baron Harper (born 26 February 1970) is a British politician who served in the Cabinet as Chief Whip from 2015 to 2016 and as Secretary of State for Transport from 2022 to 2024. A member of the Conservative Party, he served as the Member of Parliament (MP) for Forest of Dean in Gloucestershire from 2005 until his defeat in 2024.

Harper was born in Swindon and studied philosophy, politics and economics at Brasenose College, Oxford. He was a chartered accountant before his election to Parliament. Under the coalition government of David Cameron he served as Parliamentary Secretary for Political and Constitutional Reform before being promoted to Minister of State for Immigration in the 2012 reshuffle. During his tenure at the Home Office, he devised a controversial campaign in which advertising vans told illegal migrants to "go home". He resigned as Immigration Minister in February 2014, but quickly returned to government as Minister of State for Disabled People in the July 2014 reshuffle.

Harper was promoted to Cameron's cabinet as Chief Whip following the 2015 general election; he served in the role for a year before being sacked by incoming Prime Minister Theresa May in 2016. Harper was a candidate for leader of the Conservative Party in the 2019 leadership contest, finishing ninth out of 10 candidates with 10 votes. During the Johnson premiership, he was the chair of the COVID Recovery Group of Conservative MPs advocating for looser COVID-19 restrictions. After Rishi Sunak became Prime Minister, Harper was appointed to the Cabinet as Secretary of State for Transport.

== Early life and education ==
Harper was born and raised in Swindon, Wiltshire, where he had a working-class upbringing: his father was a manual worker and his mother was employed by a book club. He was educated at Headlands Comprehensive School and Swindon College. He read philosophy, politics and economics at Brasenose College, Oxford, where he studied under Professor Vernon Bogdanor.

== Early career ==
Upon graduation in 1991, Harper joined KPMG as an auditor. After qualifying as a chartered accountant, he joined Intel Corporation. In 2002, he left Intel to set up his own accountancy practice.

Before entering Parliament, Harper was the treasurer of the Swindon Conservative Association and served as vice-chairman for a year in 1998.

== Parliamentary career ==
At the 2001 general election, Harper contested the Gloucestershire seat of Forest of Dean but came second to the incumbent Labour Party MP Diana Organ; Harper won 38.8% of the vote.

Organ retired at the 2005 general election and Harper was elected for the Conservatives with a majority of 2,049 votes, similar to the Labour majority at the previous election, and 40.9% of the vote. At the same general election, Harper's wife Margaret stood for election as the Conservative candidate in Worcester, where she finished in second place to the Labour candidate, Michael Foster.

On 24 May 2005, Harper made his maiden speech, in which he advocated giving the parents of children with special educational needs the option of sending their children to a non-mainstream school – an issue of local interest in Harper's Gloucestershire seat and one close to the heart of the then Shadow Education Secretary, David Cameron, whose son Ivan was born with severe learning difficulties. When Cameron was elected leader of the party in December 2005, he made Harper a spokesman on armed forces welfare issues and veterans.

Harper has sat on the Commons Administration Committee and briefly on the Work and Pensions Committee. On matters of foreign policy, he has consistently voted in support of British military intervention overseas. Harper was described in 2015 as a Eurosceptic. Even so, he campaigned to remain in the European Union during the 2016 referendum on ending the UK's membership.

The scandal over MPs' expenses showed Harper to be a frugal parliamentarian: his only significant expenses claim was for a brief period of temporary accommodation occupied on a short-term basis soon after being elected in 2005.

In the reshuffle of July 2007, Harper was made Shadow Minister for Disabled People, a position he held until the general election in 2010.

=== Junior Minister at the Cabinet Office ===
At the 2010 general election, Harper was re-elected with an increased vote share of 46.9% and an increased majority of 11,064. Soon afterwards, Harper became Parliamentary Secretary for Political and Constitutional Reform. He worked with Deputy Prime Minister Nick Clegg on the Parliamentary Voting System and Constituencies Act 2011 that changed the voting system for electing MPs (Harper was not enthusiastic about the proposal, which had been a key bargaining chip in the coalition negotiations in May 2010).

In October 2010, the government introduced the Public Bodies Act to the House of Lords, which would allow it to sell or lease public forests in England. Harper supported the bill, describing it as an "exciting opportunity for community ownership." However, the measure was widely criticised by many residents within his Forest of Dean constituency and by politicians with connections to the large oak forest after which Harper's parliamentary seat is named – including Baroness Jan Royall, leader of the opposition in the House of Lords. Following a public meeting – after which Harper had to be rescued by the police from what he described as "a baying mob" – and a sustained national campaign which included the newly formed local Forest of Dean pressure group Hands off our Forest, the government announced it had abandoned its plans and would remove the forestry clauses from the Public Bodies Bill.

Harper worked on the House of Lords Reform Bill, which set out to introduce a smaller second chamber consisting mostly of elected peers. This was a Liberal Democrat policy that had also been mentioned as an aspiration in the Conservative Party's manifesto of 2010. In July 2012, 91 Conservative MPs defied the whips and voted with Labour against the proposals, something which led the coalition government to abandon the planned reform soon afterwards.

=== Immigration Minister ===
In the reshuffle of September 2012, Harper was promoted to Minister of State for Immigration at a time when levels of inward migration were falling but emigration rates were falling faster still, leading to a rise in net migration into the UK.

Over the summer of 2013, Harper trialled a campaign aimed at illegal immigrants that consisted, in part, of lorries with hoardings attached to their load areas driving around London displaying the sign "Here Illegally? Go Home or Risk Arrest" with more information in smaller print on how to contact the Home Office for advice. The scheme was seen as offensive by some and it divided opinion within the coalition's ministerial team. In October 2013, Harper told MPs: "The advertising vans in particular were too much of a blunt instrument and will not be used again". As immigration minister, Harper stated "British citizenship is a privilege, not a right".

Harper resigned as immigration minister on 8 February 2014, after he discovered that his self-employed cleaner did not have permission to work in the UK. In his resignation letter, Harper stated that he first made checks on his cleaner in 2007 and "considered the issue again" when appointed a minister in the Cabinet Office in 2010 and immigration minister in September 2012 but had concluded that "no further check was necessary". After launching a campaign to get employers and landlords to carry out "reasonable checks" on workers, Harper said that he thought it prudent to check the documents again, but could not locate them, and asked his cleaner for new copies. When his private office checked the details with immigration officials, it was found she did not have indefinite leave to stay in the UK. He immediately told Home Secretary Theresa May, and then after notifying Prime Minister David Cameron, he resigned. He was replaced by James Brokenshire.

=== Minister for Disabled People ===
The ministerial reshuffle in July 2014 saw Harper restored to office in the role of Minister of State for Disabled People at the Department for Work and Pensions (DWP). He took over responsibility for the relatively new Personal Independence Payment (PIP), as well as for the Work Capability Assessment (WCA) used to assess entitlement to Employment and Support Allowance (ESA) – a legacy of New Labour. Both operations were plagued by large backlogs of unassessed claims.

In October 2014, the Office for Budget Responsibility disclosed that Harper's department had failed to make the anticipated £3 billion annual saving in incapacity benefits spending expected by 2014 (the DWP achieved no saving at all from this budget over the whole of the 2010–15 parliamentary term).

In December 2014, Harper attracted negative media attention after Steve Parry-Hearn, a prospective Labour parliamentary candidate, accused him of hypocrisy when he called for businesses to improve disabled access, even though his own high street constituency office was inaccessible to wheelchair users.

In January 2015, Harper appeared before the Work and Pensions Select Committee to face questions over the problems with PIP. A former senior civil servant appointed by the DWP to review PIP had found the scheme beset by "delays and backlogs" and had described the process, which was introduced by another minister in April 2013, as still representing "a major delivery challenge." Macmillan benefits advisers had told the reviewer that people had died while waiting for their PIP claim to be processed. The MS Society described these delays as unacceptable and some charities called for the PIP scheme to be halted.

In March 2015, the US firm Maximus began carrying out WCAs in place of Atos under a completely new contract that would cost almost £600 million and run until late 2018. There was initial optimism within Whitehall that a new contract and a new provider would mean the start of a new chapter in fit-for-work assessment, although two House of Commons select committees – the Work and Pensions Committee and the Public Accounts Committee – had between them concluded that the DWP's policies, its operational decisions and its failure to monitor Atos adequately were to blame for many of the assessment's earlier failings. A review by the National Audit Office of the performance of the new contract in its first year was sceptical about its value for money, although the WCA backlog had been virtually eliminated by the spring of 2016.

By the time he left the DWP, Harper had brought about a substantial reduction in the size of the backlog of PIP claims as well. This was achieved by: drafting in hundreds more DWP decision-makers; assessing more claims on the basis of the documents supplied by claimants, rather than through more time-consuming face-to-face assessments; changing the way that waiting times were measured; and streamlining the whole end-to-end process.

=== Government Chief Whip ===
At the 2015 general election, Harper was again re-elected with a decreased vote share of 46.8% and a decreased majority of 10,987. He was promoted to Chief Whip after the Conservative general election victory in May 2015.

In December 2015, after a vote in favour of using Britain's military capabilities against the Islamic State in Syria, the London Evening Standard reported that: "David Cameron dashed to the Government whips' office to congratulate Chief Whip Mark Harper following the Commons vote on the war, which saw MPs back action after a 10-hour debate."

=== Backbench MP ===
Following David Cameron's resignation and the ascension of Theresa May to the Prime Ministership, May dismissed Harper from the cabinet and he returned to the backbenches.

At the snap 2017 general election, Harper was again re-elected with an increased vote share of 54.3% and a decreased majority of 9,502. He was again re-elected at the 2019 general election with an increased vote share of 59.6% and an increased majority of 15,869.

During the COVID-19 pandemic, Harper was a critic of the government's approach. In November 2020, he became chair of the COVID Recovery Group, a group of MPs who advocated against lockdown and for looser restrictions.

In April 2022, Harper submitted a letter of no confidence in Prime Minister Boris Johnson in the wake of the Partygate scandal. Harper said that Johnson was "no longer worthy" of remaining Prime Minister.

In June 2022, Harper was re-selected as the Conservative candidate for Forest of Dean at the 2024 general election.

=== Secretary of State for Transport (2022–2024) ===
Upon the accession of Rishi Sunak to the Prime Ministership, Harper made a return to the frontbench when he was appointed Secretary of State for Transport on 25 October 2022. His appointment came amid a period of significant industrial action held by railway staff. Harper refused to negotiate with the unions, which led to a years-long standoff and rolling strikes. In July 2023 the closure of almost all ticket offices at railway stations, making hundreds of staff redundant, was proposed after Harper instructed train operators to cut costs. The proposal was later scrapped.

In October 2023, Harper spoke out against the governing Conservative Party's transportation policies, particularly anti-pollution charges on cars and low speed limits. He called his party "proudly pro-car." In particular, his speech at the party conference appeared to "echo conspiracy theories about sinister plots linked to the concept of '15-minute cities'", suggesting that councils could "decide when people could go the shops", described by the BBC as "not an accurate characterisation of '15-minute cities'."

At the 2024 general election, the railway unions campaigned specifically against Harper, aiming to dislodge him in favour of the Labour candidate Matt Bishop. Harper was narrowly defeated in the election. Negotiations resumed after his defeat and the dispute was largely resolved by the new government that September.

=== House of Lords ===
It was announced in the 2024 Prime Minister's Resignation Honours of April 2025 that Harper was to be made a life peer; he was created as Baron Harper, of Forest of Dean in the County of Gloucestershire on 12 May 2025. He was introduced to the House of Lords the next day, where he sits as a Conservative peer.

== Personal life ==
Harper is married to Margaret. In 2015, he was sworn in as a member of Her Majesty's Most Honourable Privy Council. This gave him the honorific prefix "The Right Honourable" for life.

Parliament of the United Kingdom
Preceded by Diana Organ	Member of Parliament for the Forest of Dean; 2005–2024	Succeeded by Matt Bishop
Political offices
Preceded by Andrew Robathan	Shadow Minister for Forces Families and Welfare; 2005–2007	Succeeded by Andrew Murrison
Preceded by Jeremy Hunt	Shadow Minister for the Disabled; 2007–2010	Position abolished
Preceded by Damian Green	Minister of State for Immigration; 2012–2014	Succeeded by James Brokenshire as Minister of State for Security and Immigration
Preceded by Mike Penning	Minister of State for Disabled People; 2014–2015	Succeeded by Justin Tomlinson
Preceded by Michael Gove	Government Chief Whip in the House of Commons; 2015–2016	Succeeded by Gavin Williamson
Preceded by Michael Gove	Parliamentary Secretary to the Treasury; 2015–2016	Succeeded by Gavin Williamson
Preceded by Anne-Marie Trevelyan	Secretary of State for Transport; 2022–2024	Succeeded by Louise Haigh
Party political offices
Preceded by Michael Gove	Conservative Chief Whip in the House of Commons; 2015–2016	Succeeded by Gavin Williamson
