= William Seager (businessman) =

Welsh shipping magnate and Liberal Party politician (1862-1941)

Sir William Henry Seager
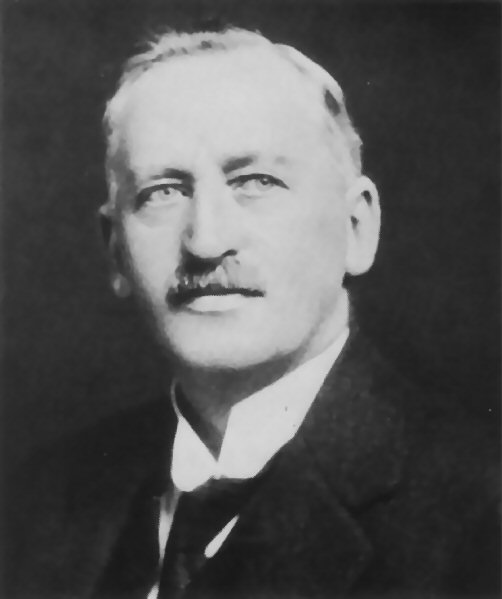

Member of Parliament for Cardiff East
- In office 14 December 1918 – 26 October 1922
- Preceded by: Constituency established
- Succeeded by: Lewis Lougher

Personal details
- Born: 1862 Cardiff, Wales
- Died: 10 March 1941 (aged 78–79)
- Party: Liberal

Sir William Henry Seager (1862 – 10 March 1941) was a Welsh shipping magnate and Liberal Party politician who spent four years as a Member of Parliament (MP).

== Life ==
William Henry Seager outside his store on Bute Street Cardiff

The Seager family were originally from Ilfracombe, Devon, but moved to Cardiff in the 1850s. William Henry Seager was born in Cardiff and initially worked as a clerk but established his own business, W. H. Seager & Company, ship's chandlers, at 109, Bute Street, Cardiff in 1892. In 1904 he bought a new ship, the 'Tempus'. By 1910 he was buying more ships, another new ship which Seager called the Amicus, then three older ships which he renamed Beatus, Salvus and Virtus, and also by 1914 the Campus had been added to the line. After the First World War three vessels were sold, but more were bought, and by 1928 W. H. Seager & Co. had a total of seven.

A Liberal in politics, Seager was elected at the 1918 general election to the House of Commons as MP for Cardiff East and held the seat until he stood down at the 1922 general election. He was knighted in the 1918 New Year Honours. In memory of his son Willie who was killed in action in 1916 at the age of 23, he built the William Seager Memorial Homes in Cardiff for retired Merchant Seamen and their wives and an operating theatre in Cardiff Royal Infirmary

He lived at Croft-Y-Bwla, near Monmouth and served as High Sheriff of Monmouthshire in 1932.

During the Second World War, all the company's ships except the Campus were lost to enemy action. Seager died in March 1941.

== Family ==
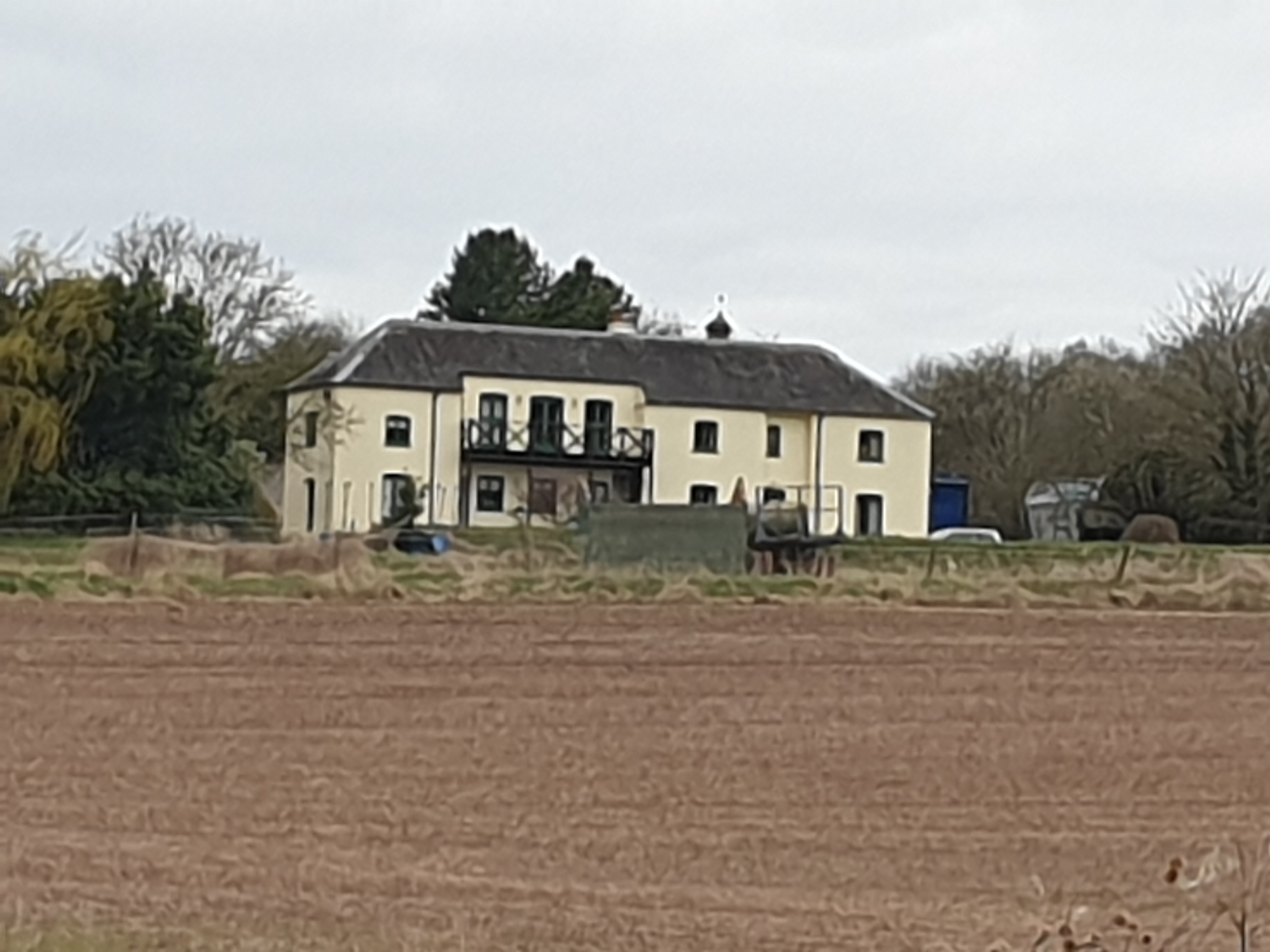
Croft-y-Bwla

William Henry Seager was the son of William and Mary Jane Seager, originally of Ilfracombe. He married Margaret Annie Elliot in Cardiff in 1890. His sons John Elliot Seager and Leighton Seager (granted a peerage as Baron Leighton of St Mellons in 1962) were also leading Cardiff business men.

Parliament of the United Kingdom
New constituency	Member of Parliament for Cardiff East; 1918 – 1922	Succeeded by Lewis Lougher
