= William Lane (cricketer) =

English banker, magistrate and cricketer

William Ward Claypon Lane-Claypon (Note: Born William Ward Claypon Lane, he changed his name to William Ward Claypon Lane-Claypon by royal licence in February 1877.) (1 August 1845 – 31 March 1939) was an English banker, magistrate and a cricketer who played in a few first-class cricket matches for Cambridge University and Surrey between 1866 and 1870. He was born at Kennington, at the time of his birth part of Surrey, now an inner London suburb.

== Education and cricket career ==
Lane was educated at Westminster School and Trinity College, Cambridge. He played cricket as a lower-order right-hand batsman and a right-arm slow round-arm bowler in single first-class matches for Cambridge University in both 1866 and 1867, and then against the university for Southgate Cricket Club in 1868, all without success. He made 36 and 11 playing for Surrey against Oxford University also in 1868, but played only one further first-class match, a second game for Surrey in 1870 in which he was again not successful. His brother Charlton had a much longer first-class cricket career for Surrey, Oxford University and various amateur sides.

== Career ==
After leaving Cambridge, Lane moved to Lincolnshire where he was involved in a bank at Boston and became a Justice of the Peace. He is recorded as "of Aswardby Hall, Spilsby". Later he moved back to the London area and was a warden of the Worshipful Company of Mercers and involved with the livery company's educational charities; he was Master of the company in 1899. He was a director of the Capital and Counties Bank.

== Personal life ==
He married Edith Stow. Their daughter Janet Lane-Claypon (1877–1967) was a pioneering physician and cancer researcher. He died at Wheathampstead, Hertfordshire. The cricketer Montague Stow was his brother-in-law.
