= Godfrey Samuelson =

Godfrey Blundell Samuelson (3 June 1863 – 3 November 1941) was a British Liberal Party politician. He sat in the House of Commons from 1887 to 1892.

Samuelson unsuccessfully contested the 1885 general election in the Tewkesbury division of Gloucestershire. He was unsuccessful again at the 1886 general election in the Frome division of Somerset, where he was defeated by the Conservative candidate in what had been a Liberal-held seat.

He entered Parliament the following year, when he was elected at by-election in July 1887 as Member of Parliament (MP) for the Forest of Dean, following the resignation of the Liberal MP Thomas Blake.

Samuelson did not stand again at the next general election, in 1892.

Parliament of the United Kingdom
Preceded by Thomas Blake	Member of Parliament for Forest of Dean; 1887–1892	Succeeded by Sir Charles Dilke
