= 1876 Leominster by-election =

UK Parliamentary by-election

The 1876 Leominster by-election was a by-election held on 15–16 February 1876 for the British House of Commons constituency of Leominster in Herefordshire.

The by-election was caused by the resignation on 8 February 1876 of the serving Conservative Party MP, Richard Arkwright. After a close-fought campaign, the result was a gain for the Liberal candidate, Thomas Blake, with a majority of 85 over the Conservative, Charles Spencer Bateman Hanbury Kincaid-Lennox, brother of Lord Bateman. This came as something of a surprise as no Liberal had been elected to the constituency for the previous 25 years.

== Result ==
Leominster by-election, 1876
Party	Candidate	Votes	%	±%
Liberal	Thomas Blake	434	55.4	New
Conservative	Charles Spencer Bateman Hanbury Kincaid-Lennox	349	44.6	N/A
Majority		85	10.8	N/A
Turnout		783	84.3	N/A
Liberal gain from Conservative		Swing	N/A	

== See also ==
- List of United Kingdom by-elections
- Leominster constituency
