= John Worthington (British politician) =

British politician (1872–1951)

Sir John Vigers Worthington MP

Member of Parliament for Forest of Dean
- In office 1931–1935
- Preceded by: David Vaughan
- Succeeded by: M. Philips Price
- Majority: 1,524

Parliamentary Private Secretary to the Prime Minister
- In office 1931–1935 Serving with Ralph Glyn (1931–1935); Frank Markham (1931–1932)
- Prime Minister: Ramsay McDonald
- Preceded by: Robert Morrison
- Succeeded by: Geoffrey Lloyd

Personal details
- Born: John Vigers Worthington; 28 December 1872
- Died: 16 June 1951 (aged 78)
- Party: National Labour
- Education: Woodbridge School, Suffolk; Haileybury School, Herts
- Alma mater: London Hospital Medicine School
- Occupation: Surgeon

Sir John Vigers Worthington (28 December 1872 – 16 June 1951) was a British surgeon and businessman, who later went into politics. After securing a remarkable election victory he served in Parliament in the early-1930s, being an unpaid assistant to Prime Minister Ramsay MacDonald. His mining constituency suffered particular difficulties in the depression and despite his efforts to help, he was defeated in his bid for re-election.

== Medical training ==
Worthington's family came from Lowestoft, Suffolk, and his father was a surgeon. He was sent to public school, beginning at Woodbridge School and then at Haileybury. Worthington initially sought to follow his father's profession, studying medicine at London Hospital Medicine School. In 1892 Worthington won a £3 prize in practical anatomy; he qualified as a surgeon in 1895 by taking the conjoint diploma. He found employment as an assistant demonstrator in anatomy at the school, and was also official surgeon to the Mission to Deep Sea Fishermen.

== Business career ==
Dissatisfied with medicine as a career, in 1901 Worthington left to join Dunlop Rubber Company with whom he remained for 20 years. He worked as a technical superintendent of factories, and in March 1916 was appointed as a Director of the company; he also became a Director of Dunlop America. He was technical superintendent of the company for two years, but owing to ill health he was forced to resign from that position and from his directorships in October 1920. He was later associated with the Moran Tea Company.

== Politics ==
According to Worthington's obituary in The Times, he was dissatisfied with the economic policies of the Labour government, a dissatisfaction which increased after the report of the May Committee. He decided to stand for Parliament and joined with the group of Labour Party members who supported Ramsay MacDonald's decision to form the National Government. After a general election was called in October 1931, Worthington was adopted as the National Labour candidate for Forest of Dean division; simultaneously the division's adopted Conservative Party candidate Richard Tufnell, withdrew from the election. Worthington had a straight fight with the sitting Labour MP, David Vaughan, and succeeded in winning the election with a majority of 1,524, regarded as an "outstanding result" by The Times; four years later it was described as the most remarkable victory in the West of England.

== Parliament ==
Soon after the new Parliament assembled, in December 1931 Worthington accepted the offer from Ramsay MacDonald to act as his Parliamentary Private Secretary, an unpaid post which required him to keep in touch with the opinion of Government-supporting backbencher Members of Parliament about MacDonald and advise MacDonald how to maintain support. Busy with this duty it was not until April 1932 that he made his maiden speech in support of the Wheat Bill which brought in a subsidy to farmers growing wheat. The next month he called attention to the good example set by Parliament using smokeless fuel and said that he would support legislation to make smokeless fuel compulsory for London houses above a certain rental level. Worthington also strongly supported the use of hire purchase as "thoroughly good and sound business".

A serious illness in 1933 restricted Worthington's political activity, and early in 1934 he had to deal with a severe economic blow to his constituency when the owners of Lightmoor Colliery at Cinderford gave notice of its closure. Worthington arranged a conference with their representatives, who agreed to delay closure in the hope that the workers could transfer to the nearby Northern United Colliery when it was ready to open. He strongly supported the Depressed Areas (Development and Improvement) Bill late in 1934, while calling for its scope to be extended to include his own constituency. He supported increased import duties on steel, criticising the steelmakers for their "complete indifference" to the ore miners and hoping that the increased duties would get the mines in the Forest of Dean working again.

== Defeat ==
In the early summer of 1934, Worthington took the initiative in setting up a "National Committee" in Forest of Dean which would allow his own supporters in National Labour to meet with local members of the Conservative Party and Liberal Nationals, with a view to making co-operation easier. When Ramsay MacDonald retired as Prime Minister in June 1935, Worthington (who had remained his Parliamentary Private Secretary throughout) was given a Knighthood in the 1935 Birthday Honours. He faced strong opposition at the 1935 general election, given the Labour Party tradition of the constituency and the adoption of a local candidate. Against Worthington's help for local industries, his Labour opponents pointed to the means test, economic difficulties in the mines, and the need for a reorganisation in the mining industry. Worthington was defeated by 4,431 votes.

Worthington remained interested in politics and worried in 1936 that the National Government would struggle to retain its support among progressive voters, especially if its candidates had to stand as Conservatives. When the National Labour minister J. H. Thomas resigned his seat at Derby shortly afterwards, Worthington was expected to be named as the National Labour candidate for the ensuing by-election. However Worthington did not run; he remained Deputy Chairman of the National Labour Organisation.

Parliament of the United Kingdom
Preceded by David Vaughan	Member of Parliament for Forest of Dean; 1931–1935	Succeeded by M. Philips Price
Government offices
Preceded by Robert Morrison	Parliamentary Private Secretary to the Prime Minister; 1931–1935 serving alongside Ralph Glyn (1931–1935) and Frank Markham (1931–1932)	Succeeded by Geoffrey Lloyd
