= Alonzo Swales =

British trade unionist

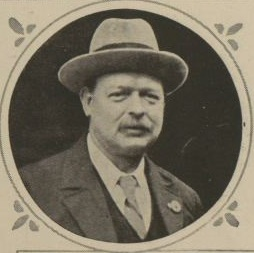
Swales in 1920

Alonso Beaumont Swales (1870 – 27 September 1952) was a British trade unionist.

Born in Middlesbrough, England Swales began work in an engineering office before training as a blacksmith. He joined the Amalgamated Society of Engineers in 1890, and became an organiser for the union in 1912. He progressed to serve on the union's Executive Committee from 1917, and on the General Council of the Trades Union Congress (TUC) from 1919. He was President of the TUC in 1925, and, during his term of office, he chaired the first meeting of a national organisation of trades councils.

A long-term member of the Independent Labour Party, having joined in 1895, Swales was regarded as the most left-wing member of the TUC General Council during the British General Strike. During the strike, he chaired the TUC's Special Industrial Committee, which co-ordinated contact with the Miners' Federation of Great Britain and joint action. He stood to become president of the Engineers in 1930, winning the first round of the ballot, but lost to W. H. Hutchinson in the second round.

Swales retired from his union posts in 1935, but took a new post as Trustee for the National Union of Seamen.

Trade union offices
Preceded by William C. Robinson and Robert Barrie Walker	Trades Union Congress representative to the American Federation of Labour; 1924; With: Charlie Cramp	Succeeded by A. A. Purcell and Ben Smith
Preceded by Alf Purcell	President of the Trades Union Congress; 1925	Succeeded by Arthur Pugh
