= Clement Kinloch-Cooke =

British politician

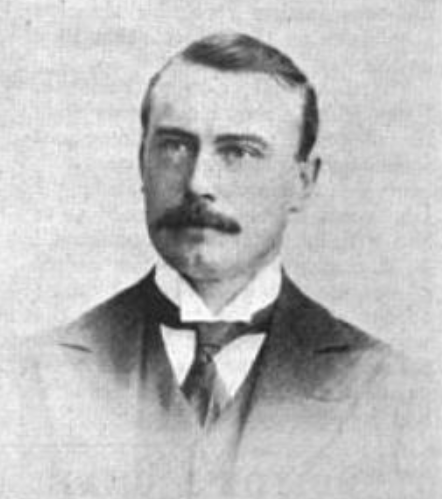
- Born: Clement Cooke; 28 October 1854; Holborn, England
- Died: 4 September 1944 (aged 89); Wimbledon, England
- Education: Brighton College; St. John's College, Cambridge
- Occupation(s): Journalist, politician
- Spouse: Florence Turbot (m. 1898; died 1944)

Sir Clement Kinloch-Cooke, 1st Baronet KBE (né Cooke; 28 October 1854 – 4 September 1944) was a British journalist and politician.

== Biography ==
Born Clement Cooke in Holborn, the only son of Robert Whall Cooke of Brighton, Sussex, he was educated at Brighton College, and at St. John's College, Cambridge, where he read mathematics and law. He was called to the bar in 1883 by the Inner Temple, whereupon he joined the Oxford Circuit, and became Treasury prosecuting counsel for Berkshire. Later he was legal advisor to the House of Lords Sweating Commission and private secretary to Windham Wyndham-Quin, 4th Earl of Dunraven and Mount-Earl, Under-Secretary of State for the Colonies (1885–87). He was also examiner under the Civil Service Commission for factory inspectorships.

Cooke followed with an active career in journalism, writing and editing for English Illustrated Magazine, the Observer, the Pall Mall Gazette, and the New Review. He wrote on imperial and colonial subjects. During this time he also wrote an authorised memoir of Princess Mary Adelaide of Cambridge, Duchess of Teck, and a biography of Mary of Teck. He founded the Empire Review in 1901 and that connexion remained for the remainder of his life.

Cooke assumed the additional surname of Kinloch in 1905, which was also the year that he was initially created a knight bachelor. From that time a career in politics followed.

Kinloch-Cooke became a member of the London County Council in 1907. He was elected at the January 1910 general election as a Unionist Member of Parliament (MP) for Devonport, and he held that seat until his defeat at the 1923 general election by the Liberal Party candidate Leslie Hore-Belisha. He was returned to the House of Commons the following year as MP for Cardiff East, and held that seat until he was defeated at the 1929 general election. He served as chairman of Naval and Dockyards Committee for 14 years, and the Expiring Laws and Continuance Act Committee.

He was created a Knight Commander in the Order of the British Empire in 1919, and a baronet of Brighthelmstone, Sussex in 1926.

Baronets.
Kinloch-Cooke, Sir Clement, K.B.E., M.P. for Devonport, January 1910, for Devonport Division, December 1918, and November, 1922, and for Cardiff East since 1924. Founded in 1905 the Central Emigration Board of which he is Chairman, and has done yeoman work in connexion with emigration. For political and public services.

== Personal life and death ==
In 1898, he married Florence Turbot, the third daughter of Rev. John Lancelot Turbot (formerly Errington) and Lady Kinloch-Cooke predeceased him on 15 August 1944. He died 4 September 1944, in Wimbledon at the age of 89.

Parliament of the United Kingdom
Preceded by John Benn; Hudson Kearley	Member of Parliament for Devonport; Jan 1910 – 1923; With: Sir John Jackson to 1918	Succeeded by Leslie Hore-Belisha
Preceded by Sir Henry Webb, Bt	Member of Parliament for Cardiff East; 1924 – 1929	Succeeded by James Edmunds
Baronetage of the United Kingdom
New creation	Baronet (of Brighthelmstone); 1926–1944	Extinct
