= Richard Arkwright (barrister) =

Richard Arkwright DL (22 January 1835 – 14 November 1918) was an English barrister and Conservative Party politician.

Arkwright was the second son of John Arkwright, of Hampton Court, Herefordshire, and the great-grandson of the cotton-spinning industrialist Sir Richard Arkwright. His brother, John Hungerford Arkwright, was Lord Lieutenant of Herefordshire, whose son John Stanhope Arkwright was also an MP. He was educated at Harrow and Trinity College, Cambridge, graduating in 1857. He was called to the bar from Lincoln's Inn in 1859 and in 1862 married Lady Mary Caroline Byng, a daughter of the Earl of Strafford.

Arkwright was elected as Member of Parliament (MP) for Leominster at an unopposed by-election in February 1866, and stated that his position was not to oppose every change, but that he was against any 'great organic changes being made in matters connected with Church or State'. He held the seat until he resigned from the House of Commons on 8 February 1876. At the resulting by-election, the Leominster seat was gained by a Liberal.

After retiring from parliament, Arkwright was appointed a Deputy Lieutenant for Herefordshire.

In 1886, Arkwright published Driven Home: A Tale of Destiny under the pseudonym Evelyn Owen. It is a mystery story with supernatural elements. In 1889, he published a second novel, The Queen Anne’s Gate Mystery. This is a detective story with an aristocratic female detective Lady Geraldine accompanied by her husband, who is also the narrator.

Parliament of the United Kingdom
Preceded by Gathorne Hardy; Arthur Walsh	Member of Parliament for Leominster; 1866–1876; With: Arthur Walsh to 1866; Viscount Mahon 1866–1868	Succeeded by Thomas Blake
