= Edward Forber =

Sir Edward Rodolph Forber, KCB, CBE (20 July 1878 – 8 July 1960) was an English civil servant.

== Life ==
Born in Liverpool, Forber was the eldest son of Thomas Forber, and was educated at Liverpool College, University College, Liverpool, and Trinity College, Cambridge, where he was admitted in 1897 as a sub-sizar and became a scholar in 1899. In 1900 he graduated B.A. in the Mathematical Tripos with first-class honours and was 14th Wrangler. He proceeded to M.A. by seniority in 1904.

In 1900, Forber entered the civil service as a clerk to the Local Government Board.

In 1905 at Toxteth Forber married Catherine Mary Howell, and in May 1906 they had a son, Rodolph Francis Guy, born at Foots Cray and later baptized at St Bede's, Toxteth Park. In 1911 the family was living in Sidcup. Forber’s father was then a Water Inspector working for the Liverpool Corporation. In 1913 he died in mysterious circumstances. He was last seen alive in Liverpool on 23 January, and his body was found in the Leeds and Liverpool Canal at Sefton on 17 February.

In 1918 Forber was appointed a Commander of the Order of the British Empire and in 1924 a Companion of the Order of the Bath. He was Deputy Secretary at the Ministry of Health from 1925 to 1930, when he was appointed as Chairman of the Board of Customs and Excise.

Catherine Forber died in Marylebone in 1928, aged 49. In 1929, Forber married secondly Janet Lane-Claypon (1877–1967), a doctor and university administrator.

An article about Forber in the Daily Mirror in May 1931 called him Mr. E. Rodolph Forber, C.B., and mentioned that he was a Liverpudlian. In 1932 he was promoted to Knight Commander of the Order of the Bath and in 1934 became Chairman of the Board of Inland Revenue. He retired in 1938, aged sixty, due to ill health.

In 1934, Forber’s mother, Hannah Forber, died in Liverpool, where her estate was dealt with by her younger son, Thomas Forber, a shipping clerk.

In 1940 his son R. F. Forber was commissioned into the Royal Artillery.

Forber died on 8 July 1960 at White House, Claremont Road, Seaford, East Sussex, and was buried on 18 July at Bishopstone. His estate was valued for probate at £54,716.

An obituary in The Times said of Forber

Beneath a somewhat rugged exterior he was kindly and unassuming, and his pleasant sense of humour, combined with real human sympathy, made for excellent relations with the large staffs under his control. He was a proficient French and German scholar and was at home on the Continent, where his vacations were usually spent.

Government offices
Preceded by Sir James Grigg	Chairman, Board of Customs and Excise; 1930–1934	Succeeded by Sir Evelyn Murray
Preceded by Sir James Grigg	Chairman, Board of Inland Revenue; 1934–1938	Succeeded by Sir Gerald Canny
