= Owen Temple-Morris =

British politician (1896–1985)

His Honour Sir Owen Temple-Morris

Sir Owen Temple-Morris, QC (15 September 1896 – 21 April 1985) was a British barrister and Conservative politician, who sat for Cardiff East from 1931 until being appointed a County Court judge in 1942.

The son of Dr Frederick Temple-Morris, a physician and surgeon, and his wife Florence (daughter of Col Charles Lanyon Owen, C.B., of Portsmouth), Owen Temple-Morris was born at Cardiff. He was admitted as a solicitor in 1919, and was called to the Bar from Gray's Inn in 1925. Temple-Morris was appointed KC in 1937, and later served as chairman of the County Court Rule Committee.

In 1927, he married Vera, daughter of David Hamilton Thompson, of Cardiff. Their son, Peter Temple-Morris, was also a Conservative Member of Parliament (MP), but left the party and later joined the Labour Party.

Parliament of the United Kingdom
Preceded by James Edmunds	Member of Parliament for Cardiff East; 1931–1942	Succeeded by James Grigg
