= 1942 Cardiff East by-election =

UK Parliamentary by-election in Wales

← 1935	13 April 1942	1945 →

Constituency of Cardiff East
- Turnout: 33.1% (▼40.0%)
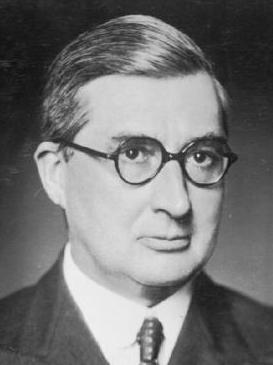

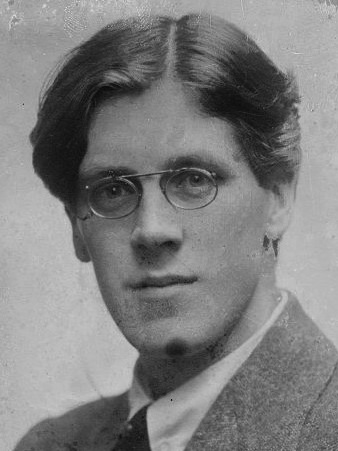
	First party	Second party
Candidate	James Grigg	Fenner Brockway
Party	National	Ind. Labour Party
Popular vote	10,030	3,311
Percentage	75.2%	24.8%
MP before election
Owen Temple-Morris
National
Elected MP
James Grigg
National

The 1942 Cardiff East by-election was a parliamentary by-election held for the British House of Commons constituency of Cardiff East on 13 April 1942.

== Vacancy ==
The by-election was caused by the appointment of the sitting National Conservative MP, Owen Temple-Morris, as a county court judge.

== Candidates ==
=== Government ===
The by-election took place during the Second World War. Under an agreement between the Conservative, Labour and Liberal parties, who were participating in a wartime coalition, the party holding a seat would not be opposed by the other two at a by-election. Accordingly, it fell to the Cardiff East Conservatives to choose the successor to Temple-Morris and they unanimously selected Sir James Grigg at the request of Conservative Central Office.

Grigg had been a career civil servant, had served at the Treasury and in India and had risen to become Permanent Under-Secretary of State at the War Office. In this role he worked closely and effectively with Sir Alan Brooke the Chief of the Imperial General Staff and in 1942, in an unorthodox move, the prime minister Winston Churchill appointed Grigg Secretary of State for War as a replacement for David Margesson whom he dismissed after the fall of Singapore to the Japanese. The timing of Temple-Morris' appointment as a judge, albeit to replace one who had died, thus creating a vacancy in Cardiff East, the appointment of Grigg as War Secretary necessitating his finding a seat in the House of Commons and the ease with which the Cardiff Tories selected Grigg as their candidate at the behest of party headquarters even though, as he admitted himself, he had no previous connection with the constituency or the Conservative Party strongly suggests that the whole process was engineered by the government.

Underlining his lack of party political credentials, Grigg stated that he intended to stand in the by-election as a National candidate without other party label. He said that as a civil servant of 30 years standing it would be unfair to the service to adopt a party affiliation and he said he had none. He declared that he wanted to be the party of national unity at a time of national emergency and that the war had to be won as a nation not by any party ticket.

=== Independent Labour Party ===
In accordance with the wartime electoral truce, the Labour and Liberal parties declined to stand candidates but Grigg was opposed by a representative of the Independent Labour Party (ILP), Fenner Brockway. Brockway was originally a journalist but became active on the left of British politics. He had been a pacifist and was imprisoned during World War I for opposing conscription and later for being a conscientious objector but his anti-fascism, particularly his support for the Republicans in the Spanish Civil War softened his anti-militarism. He had been Labour MP for Leyton East from 1929 to 1931 but after the 1931 general election the ILP disaffiliated en masse from the Labour Party and formed a separate political party. Brockway also fought elections unsuccessfully for the ILP at West Ham, Upton in 1934 in a by-election; at Norwich in the 1935 general election and at Lancaster at a by-election in 1941.

== Issues ==
The main election issue was the prosecution and conduct of the war. Grigg declared his support for the armed forces and his plans to improve equipment and training and he promised to continue to develop new weapons and devices by involving scientists in the war effort. He urged the press to cease attacks on the military leadership and the performance of the armed forces, accusing those parts of the media who did so of doing Hitler's work. In his election address Grigg wholeheartedly associated himself and his candidacy in the by-election with the fight to rid the world of Nazi and Japanese domination and to build from the wreck of the old world a better and more just new one with equality of opportunity for all. Grigg also fired a similar salvo at Brockway, claiming that he was opposed to Britain's fighting the war and warned that unless Brockway was defeated decisively, Britain's enemies would be encouraged.

In his election address, Brockway stated that the policy of a socialist Britain would not be to negotiate with Hitler but to appeal to the peoples of Europe to overthrow him. The ILP campaign emphasised the importance of socialism and the need for solidarity with the Soviet Union. However the Communists were said to be supporting the National candidate and they accused the ILP of trying to sabotage the united front against fascism. The Labour movement through the local organising secretary of the Transport and General Workers Union, John Dooley, also made clear their support of Grigg in line with official Labour Party policy.

== Outcome ==
Grigg was returned comfortably with 75% of the poll, albeit on the relatively low turnout of 33%. The by-elections of the Second World War showed evidence of the role of the war in initiating a leftward swing in British politics, and thus pointing the way towards the coming electoral landslide for Labour in 1945. They also offered voters an opportunity to rebel against the electoral truce as the success of Common Wealth and independent candidates in a number of wartime by-elections showed. However, Cardiff East was not one of these elections. A genuine cross party backing for the non-partisan figure of Sir James Grigg, a patriotic desire to support Grigg in his vital position of Secretary for War and the perception of the ILP as an extremist and anti-war organisation, all combined to ensure that Cardiff East bucked the anti-government trend of a number of mostly later by-elections.

== Result ==
1942 Cardiff East by-election
Party	Candidate	Votes	%	±%
National	James Grigg	10,030	75.2	N/A
Ind. Labour Party	Fenner Brockway	3,311	24.8	N/A
Majority		6,719	50.4	N/A
Turnout		13,341	33.1	−40.0
Registered electors		40,254		
National gain from Conservative		Swing		

== See also ==
- Lists of United Kingdom by-elections
- United Kingdom by-election records
