= Cardiff East (1918–1950) =

UK Parliament constituency (1918–1950)

Coordinates: 51.491°N 3.156°W

- Former borough constituency for the House of Commons

1918–1950
- Seats: one
- Created from: Cardiff
- Replaced by: Cardiff North and Cardiff South East

Cardiff East was a parliamentary constituency in Cardiff which returned one Member of Parliament to the House of Commons of the Parliament of the United Kingdom from 1918 until it was abolished for the 1950 general election.

== Boundaries ==
Cardiff East included the County Borough of Cardiff wards of Park, Roath, and Splott.

The ward was abolished in 1950, with Roath and Splott becoming part of the new Cardiff South East ward and the remainder joining Cardiff North.

== Members of Parliament ==
Election	Member	Party
1918	Sir William Seager	Liberal
1922	Lewis Lougher	Unionist
1923	Sir Henry Webb	Liberal
1924	Sir Clement Kinloch-Cooke	Unionist
1929	James Edmunds	Labour
1931	Owen Temple-Morris	Conservative
1942 by-election	Sir James Grigg	National
1945	Hilary Marquand	Labour
1950	constituency abolished	

== Election results ==
=== Elections in the 1910s ===
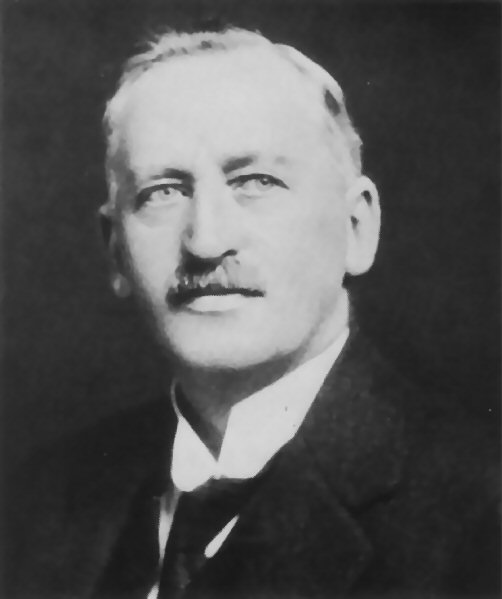
Seager

General election 1918: Cardiff East
Party	Candidate	Votes	%	±%
Liberal	William Seager	7,963	40.8	N/A
Unionist	Colum Crichton-Stuart	5,978	30.7	N/A
Labour	Arthur Williams	5,554	28.5	N/A
Majority		1,985	10.1	N/A
Turnout		19,495	64.6	N/A
Registered electors		30,164		
Liberal win (new seat)				

Seager received Coalition Government endorsement letter which was later withdrawn

=== Elections in the 1920s ===
General election 1922: Cardiff East
Party	Candidate	Votes	%	±%
Unionist	Lewis Lougher	8,804	36.8	+6.1
Liberal	Henry Webb	7,622	31.8	−9.0
Labour	Arthur Williams	7,506	31.4	+2.9
Majority		1,182	5.0	N/A
Turnout		23,932	81.0	+16.4
Registered electors		29,532		
Unionist gain from Liberal		Swing	+7.6	

Webb

General election 1923: Cardiff East
Party	Candidate	Votes	%	±%
Liberal	Henry Webb	8,536	35.8	+4.0
Labour	Hugh Dalton	7,812	32.7	+1.3
Unionist	Lewis Lougher	7,513	31.5	−5.3
Majority		724	3.1	N/A
Turnout		23,861	79.3	−1.7
Registered electors		30,100		
Liberal gain from Unionist		Swing	+1.4	

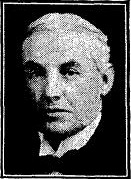
Maclean

General election 1924: Cardiff East
Party	Candidate	Votes	%	±%
Unionist	Clement Kinloch-Cooke	10,036	40.3	+8.8
Labour	Harold Lloyd	8,156	32.8	+0.1
Liberal	Donald Maclean	6,684	26.9	−8.9
Majority		1,880	7.5	N/A
Turnout		24,876	82.3	+3.0
Registered electors		30,218		
Unionist gain from Liberal		Swing	+4.4	

Emlyn-Jones

General election 1929: Cardiff East
Party	Candidate	Votes	%	±%
Labour	James Edmunds	12,813	39.0	+6.2
Liberal	John Emlyn-Jones	10,500	31.9	+5.0
Unionist	Clement Kinloch-Cooke	9,563	29.1	−11.2
Majority		2,313	7.1	N/A
Turnout		32,876	82.1	−0.2
Registered electors		40,061		
Labour gain from Unionist		Swing	+0.6	

=== Elections in the 1930s ===
General election 1931: Cardiff East
Party	Candidate	Votes	%	±%
Conservative	Owen Temple-Morris	12,465	38.6	+8.5
Labour	James Edmunds	10,292	31.8	−7.2
Liberal	John Emlyn-Jones	9,559	29.6	−2.3
Majority		2,173	6.8	N/A
Turnout		32,316	80.2	−7.9
Registered electors		40,316		
Conservative gain from Labour		Swing		

General election 1935: Cardiff East
Party	Candidate	Votes	%	±%
Conservative	Owen Temple-Morris	16,048	53.4	+14.8
Labour	William Bennett	11,362	37.8	+6.0
Liberal	Aubrey Willis Pile	2,623	8.7	−20.9
Majority		4,686	15.6	+8.8
Turnout		30,033	73.1	−8.1
Registered electors		41,076		
Conservative hold		Swing		

=== Elections in the 1940s ===
General Election 1939–40:

Another General Election was required to take place before the end of 1940. The political parties had been making preparations for an election to take place from 1939 and by the end of this year, the following candidates had been selected;

- Conservative: Owen Temple-Morris

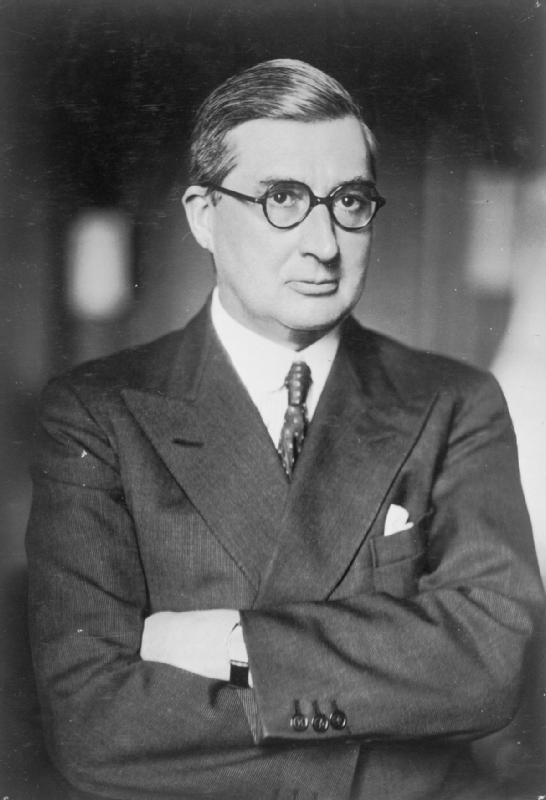
Grigg

1942 Cardiff East by-election
Party	Candidate	Votes	%	±%
National	James Grigg	10,030	75.2	N/A
Ind. Labour Party	Fenner Brockway	3,311	24.8	N/A
Majority		6,719	50.4	N/A
Turnout		13,341	33.1	−40.0
Registered electors		40,254		
National hold		Swing		

General election 1945: Cardiff East
Party	Candidate	Votes	%	±%
Labour	Hilary Marquand	16,299	50.7	+12.9
National	James Grigg	11,306	35.2	N/A
Liberal	John Emlyn-Jones	4,523	14.1	+5.4
Majority		4,993	15.5	N/A
Turnout		32,128	74.9	+1.8
Registered electors		42,950		
Labour gain from National		Swing		

The Western Mail described Sir James Grigg's defeat as "the most grievous" in the Cardiff area, considering Grigg had served as War Minister in the National government and "had proved an exceptionally valuable representative of Welsh interests in the highest quarter."
