= 1911 Forest of Dean by-election =

UK parliamentary by-election

The 1911 Forest of Dean by-election was a Parliamentary by-election held on 24 February 1911. It returned one Member of Parliament (MP) to the House of Commons of the Parliament of the United Kingdom, elected by the first past the post voting system.

== Previous result ==
General election December 1910 Electorate 10,336
Party	Candidate	Votes	%	±%
Liberal	Charles Dilke	5,544	66.3	+1.1
Conservative	David Hope Kyd	2,820	33.7	−1.1
Majority		2,724	32.6	+2.2
Turnout		8,364	76.9	−9.7
Liberal hold		Swing	+1.1	

== Candidates ==
For the Liberal Party: Henry Webb and for the Conservative Party: David Hope Kyd.

== Result ==
Harry Webb

Forest of Dean by-election, 1911:
Party	Candidate	Votes	%	±%
Liberal	Henry Webb	6,174	66.5	+0.2
Conservative	David Hope Kyd	3,106	33.5	−0.2
Majority		3,068	33.0	+0.4
Turnout		9,280	82.8	+5.9
Liberal hold		Swing	+0.2	

== Aftermath ==
Webb was appointed as a Junior Whip in 1912, which required him to face the electorate again, when he was returned unopposed. A general election was due to take place by the end of 1915. By the autumn of 1914, the following candidates had been adopted [*approved but not adopted] to contest that election. Due to the outbreak of war, the election never took place.

General Election 1914/15: Electorate 11,513
Party	Candidate	Votes	%	±%
Liberal	Henry Webb			
Labour	James Wignall			

At the 1918 general election, Webb received the coupon of endorsement from the Coalition government.

General election 14 December 1918: Electorate 27,624
Party	Candidate	Votes	%	±%
Labour	James Wignall	9,731	62.8	N/A
Liberal	Henry Webb	5,765	37.2	−29.1
Majority		3,966	25.6	N/A
Turnout		15,496	56.1	−20.8
Labour gain from Liberal		Swing		
