= Baron Leighton of St Mellons =

Barony in the Peerage of the United Kingdom

Baron Leighton of St Mellons, of St Mellons in the County of Monmouth, is a title in the Peerage of the United Kingdom, created on 25 January 1962 for the Welsh shipping magnate Sir Leighton Seager, 1st Baronet.

The youngest son of Sir William Henry Seager, Sir Leighton Seager had already been created a Baronet, of St Mellons in the County of Monmouth on 1 July 1952.

As of 2025 the hereditary titles are held by his great-grandson, the fourth Baron, who succeeded his father on 28 May 2023.

== Barons Leighton of St Mellons (1962) ==
- (George) Leighton Seager, 1st Baron Leighton of St Mellons (1896–1963)
- John Leighton Seager, 2nd Baron Leighton of St Mellons (1922–1998)
- Robert William Henry Leighton Seager, 3rd Baron Leighton of St Mellons (1955–2023)
- Richard Leighton Seager, 4th Baron Leighton of St Mellons (b. 1981)
  - The heir apparent is the present holder's son the Hon. William Leighton Seager (b. 2012)

=== Arms ===
Coat of arms of Baron Leighton of St Mellons
Crest Between two Wings Azure each charged with a Mullet a Cross moline Argent. Helm That of a Baron Escutcheon Azure a Cross moline between in bend dexter two Lymphads and in bend sinister as many Mullets all Argent. Supporters Dexter a Sea-horse (hippocampus) Azure; sinister a Dragon segreant Gules. Motto Animo Et Fide (By Courage and Faith)
