= Leighton Seager, 1st Baron Leighton of St Mellons =

British Baron, merchant and shipowner (1896-1963)

(George) Leighton Seager, 1st Baron Leighton of St Mellons, CBE (11 January 1896 – 17 October 1963), previously known as Sir George Leighton Seager, 1st Baronet, from 1952 to 1962, was a Welsh shipping magnate.

== Life ==
The youngest son of Sir William Seager, of Cardiff, founder of W. H. Seager & Company, shipowners, he became a director of the family shipping firm, later serving as President of the Cardiff Chamber of Commerce from 1934 to 1945 and of the Council of Shipping in 1944, then Prime Warden Shipwright for 1953/54.

Beside his business career he served as High Sheriff of Monmouthshire for 1938 and Vice-Lieutenant of Monmouthshire from 1957 to 1963. Knighted in 1938, he was created a Baronet, of St Mellons in the County of Monmouth on 1 July 1952 before being raised to the peerage as Baron Leighton of St Mellons on 25 January 1962.

== Family ==
In 1921 he married Marjorie (1900–1992), daughter of William Henry Gimson, of Brecon, Brecknockshire, having two sons and two daughters.

Lord Leighton of St Mellons died in 1963, being succeeded in the barony and baronetcy by his elder son John Leighton.

His eldest brother, Major John Elliot Seager MC JP DL, served as High Sheriff of Glamorgan for 1937/38.

== Honours ==
- Baron (UK) (1962)
- Baronet (1952)
- Knight Bachelor (1938)
- CBE (1932)

=== Arms ===
Coat of arms of Leighton Seager, 1st Baron Leighton of St Mellons
Crest Between two Wings Azure each charged with a Mullet a Cross moline Argent. Helm That of a Baron Escutcheon Azure a Cross moline between in bend dexter two Lymphads and in bend sinister as many Mullets all Argent. Supporters Dexter a Sea-horse (hippocampus) Azure; sinister a Dragon segreant Gules. Motto Animo Et Fide (By Courage and Faith) Orders Circlet of the Order of the British Empire

== See also ==
- Baron Leighton

Baronetage of the United Kingdom
New creation	Baronet (of St Mellons); 1952–1963	Succeeded by John Leighton Seager
Peerage of the United Kingdom
New title	Baron Leighton of St Mellons; 1962–1963	Succeeded by John Leighton Seager; 2nd Baron
