= 1866 Leominster by-election =

UK parliamentary by-election

The 1866 Leominster by-election was an uncontested election held on 26 February 1866. The by-election was brought about due to the resignation of the incumbent Conservative MP, Gathorne Hardy in order to take up his Oxford University seat. It was won by the Conservative candidate Richard Arkwright, who was the only declared candidate.

== See also ==
- List of United Kingdom by-elections (1857–1868)
