= Matt Bishop (politician) =

British politician

Matt Bishop MP
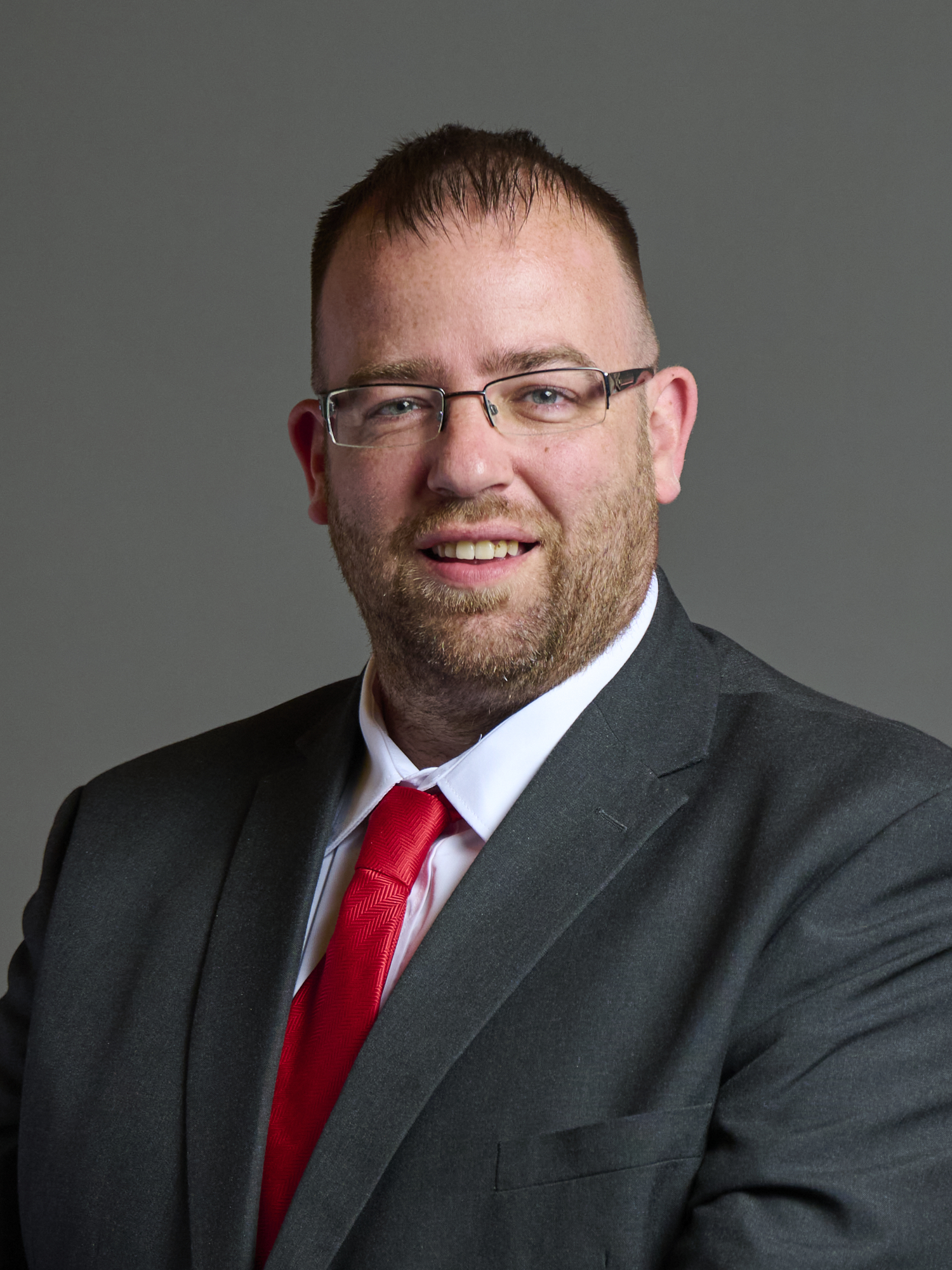
- Official portrait, 2024

Member of Parliament for Forest of Dean
- Incumbent
- Assumed office 4 July 2024
- Preceded by: Mark Harper
- Majority: 278 (0.5%)

Personal details
- Born: Matthew Adrian Bishop; 1984 (age 41–42) Newport, Wales
- Party: Labour

Matthew Adrian Bishop (born 1984) is a British Labour Party politician serving as the Member of Parliament for the Forest of Dean since July 2024.

Bishop was born in Newport, South Wales in 1984 and raised by his grandparents. He attended Lliswerry High School. Prior to entering Parliament, he worked in policing, children’s social care, housing enforcement, and as an education welfare officer. He also served as a local councillor and committee chair on the Forest of Dean District Council. His parliamentary work includes membership of select committees and legislative committees, and his policy priorities focus on education, law & order, the NHS, and local infrastructure and schools.

He defeated the incumbent Mark Harper, the Secretary of State for Transport, who had held the Forest of Dean seat for the Conservative Party since 2005.

== Local Government career ==
Bishop stood as a candidate in the 2021 Gloucestershire County Council elections, contesting the Coleford division where he came second to the incumbent Conservative candidate.

In the 2023 Forest of Dean District Council elections Bishop was elected as one of two councillors for the Cinderford East ward, winning 55.6% of the vote. At the same time, he also won a seat on Cinderford Town Council.

During his first year on the District Council, Bishop served as Chair of the Audit Committee, and in his second year he was appointed Chair of the Scrutiny Committee in his second year. Following his election to Parliament in 2024, he announced his intention to resign from both councils, timing his resignation to coincide with the 2025 Gloucestershire County Council elections. He stated that while the work of local government was “vital and deserving of full focus”, his parliamentary responsibilities required his full attention. He added that he believed additional roles should only be undertaken in exceptional circumstances, such as those involving critical public services like the NHS. Since his election as an MP, Bishop did not claim any councillor allowances.

Before his election to Parliament, Bishop also served as whip for the Labour group and later as its Group Leader on the District Council.

== Parliamentary career ==
At the 2024 General Election, Bishop was elected as the Member of Parliament (MP) for Forest of Dean, gaining the Gloucestershire seat with a majority of 278 votes and a 34.0% share of the vote.

In October 2024, he was appointed to the Terrorism (Protection of Premises) Bill Committee. He subsequently served on several other parliamentary committees, including the Finance Committee (until March 2025), the Children’s Wellbeing and Schools Bill Committee (from January 2025), and the Crime and Policing Bill Committee (from March 2025). In the same month, he was also elected to the Justice Select Committee.

Parliament of the United Kingdom
Preceded by Mark Harper	Member of Parliament for Forest of Dean; 2024–present	Incumbent
