= Diana Organ =

British politician

Diana Mary Organ

Member of Parliament for Forest of Dean
- In office 2 May 1997 – 11 April 2005
- Preceded by: Constituency established
- Succeeded by: Mark Harper

Personal details
- Born: Diana Mary Pugh; 21 February 1952 (age 74)
- Party: Labour
- Education: St Hugh's College, Oxford; University of Bath; Bristol Polytechnic

Diana Mary Organ (née Pugh; born 21 February 1952) is a British Labour Party politician who served as Member of Parliament (MP) for Forest of Dean from 1997 to 2005.

== Early life ==
Her father was Finance Controller of GKN. She went to the independent Edgbaston Church of England College for Girls in Edgbaston, Birmingham (which became the co-ed St. Georges School, Birmingham in 1999). At (then all female) St Hugh's College, Oxford, she gained a BA in Geography in 1973. At the School of Education at the University of Bath, she gained a PGCE in 1974. From Bristol Polytechnic in 1981, she gained a Diploma in Special Education.

From 1974 to 1977, she was an assistant special education teacher. She was deputy head of St Germans primary school near Saltash, Cornwall from 1977 to 1979. From 1979 to 1982, she was Head of a Special Needs Unit in Somerset. She worked on supply in special schools in Somerset from 1982 to 1988. She was an assistant English teacher in Somerset from 1988 to 1992. She worked as a political researcher for Oxfordshire County Council from 1992 to 1995.

== Parliamentary career ==
Organ contested West Gloucestershire at the 1992 general election, but was not successful. In 1995 she was again selected to stand for Labour, this time through an all-women shortlist. She was Labour Party Member of Parliament for the re-created seat of Forest of Dean from the 1997 election until she stepped down at the 2005 election, citing changing family circumstances. During her time in Parliament, she voted against the Iraq War.

During the 2009 parliamentary expenses scandal, Organ was required to repay £15,964.01 in respect of falsely claimed expenses relating to mortgage interest payments.

== Personal life ==
She married Richard in 1975. The couple have two daughters.
