= Sir Henry Webb, 1st Baronet =

British politician (1866–1940)

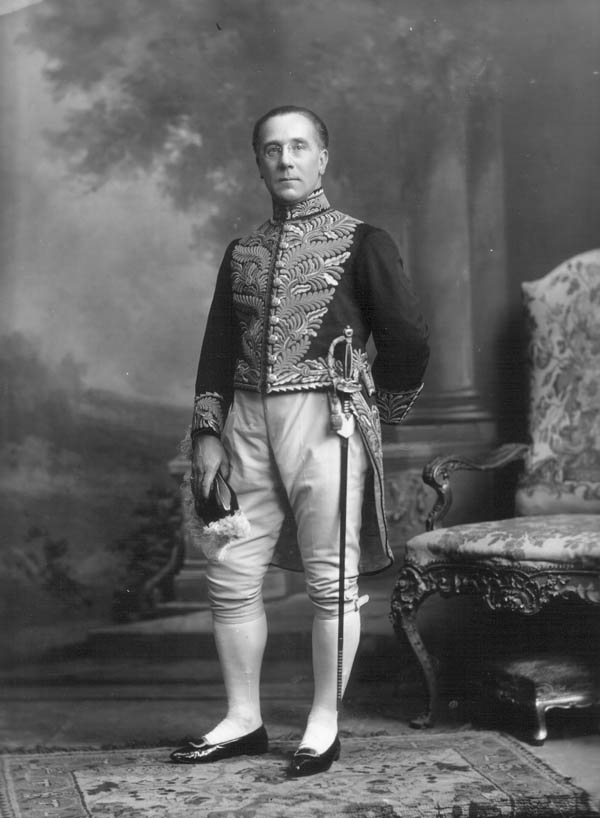

Member of Parliament for Cardiff East
- In office 6 December 1923 – 9 October 1924
- Preceded by: Lewis Lougher
- Succeeded by: Clement Kinloch-Cooke

Member of Parliament for Forest of Dean
- In office 24 February 1911 – 25 November 1918
- Preceded by: Sir Charles Dilke, 2nd Baronet
- Succeeded by: James Wignall

Personal details
- Born: 28 July 1866 Hereford, Herefordshire, England
- Died: 29 October 1940 (aged 74) Caerleon, Newport, Wales
- Party: Liberal

Lieutenant-Colonel Sir Henry Webb, 1st Baronet, JP (28 July 1866 – 29 October 1940) was a British Liberal Party politician who was Member of Parliament (MP) for Forest of Dean (1911–1918) and Cardiff East (1923–1924), and as Junior Lord of the Treasury (1912–1915).

== Biography ==
Educated at Lausanne and Paris, known as "Harry", he trained as a mining engineer and became a director of several South Wales collieries. He was High Sheriff of Monmouthshire for 1921 and a JP in three counties.

During World War I, he raised and commanded the 13th Battalion Gloucestershire Regiment and the 13th Battalion Worcestershire Regiment. He also commanded the 23rd (Works) Battalion, the King's Regiment (Liverpool) and the Western Command Labour Centre.

=== Baronet ===
On 28 January 1916, he was made a baronet, of Llwynarthen, Monmouth. On his death the baronetcy became extinct.

=== Marriages ===
He was married twice: in 1894 to Ellen Williams, who died in 1919; and then to Helena Kate de Paula.

=== Basil Webb ===
His only son, Second Lieutenant Thomas Harry Basil Webb (1898–1917), known as "Basil", Welsh Guards, was killed in action in World War I, on 1 December 1917, at the age of 19. Basil Webb had been the model for the famous Welsh sculptor Sir William Goscombe John RA when he produced the bronze sculpture, "The Boy Scout" in 1910. At the age of 12, Basil also composed the Refectory Prayer for Chester Cathedral, which remains in use today. In 1919 Sir Henry Webb bore the costs of renovating the crypt and altar of Chester Cathedral, where an inscription may still be found identifying the restoration work "in memory of his gallant son and his companions".

== Sources ==
- Sir Henry Webb, Obituary, The Times, London, 31 October 1940
- "New Lord of the Treasury. A By-Election in the Forest of Dean", The Times, 17 April 1912

Parliament of the United Kingdom
Preceded by Sir Charles Wentworth Dilke, Bt	Member of Parliament for Forest of Dean; 1911–1918	Succeeded by James Wignall
Preceded by Lewis Lougher	Member of Parliament for Cardiff East; 1923–1924	Succeeded by Sir Clement Kinloch-Cooke, Bt
Baronetage of the United Kingdom
New creation	Baronet (of Llwynarthen); 1916–1940	Extinct
