= James Grigg =

British politician (1890–1964)

The Right Honourable Sir James Grigg KCB KCSI
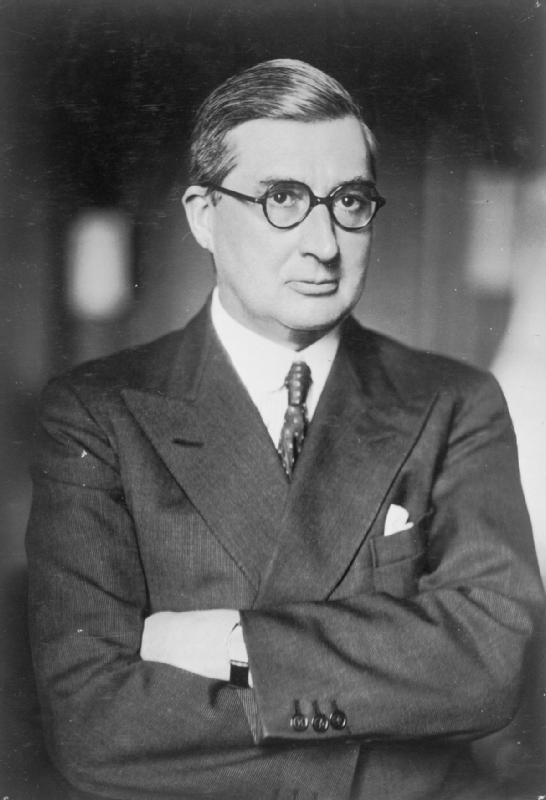
- Grigg in 1942

Secretary of State for War
- In office 22 February 1942 – 26 July 1945
- Monarch: George VI
- Prime Minister: Winston Churchill
- Preceded by: David Margesson
- Succeeded by: Jack Lawson

Member of Parliament for Cardiff East
- In office 13 April 1942 – 15 June 1945
- Preceded by: Owen Temple-Morris
- Succeeded by: Hilary Marquand

Personal details
- Born: 16 December 1890 Exmouth, Devon
- Died: 5 May 1964 (aged 73)
- Education: St John's College, Cambridge

Sir Percy James Grigg, KCB, KCSI (16 December 1890 – 5 May 1964), often referred to as P J Grigg and later better known as Sir James Grigg, was a British civil servant. In a very unusual move, during the Second World War he was promoted by Prime Minister Winston Churchill from being the Permanent Under-Secretary of State (head civil servant) at the War Office to become Secretary of State for War, the Cabinet Minister in charge of the same department.

== Background and education ==
The son of Frank Alfred Grigg, a carpenter, James Grigg was born in Exmouth and won a scholarship to Bournemouth School and St John's College, Cambridge where he studied mathematics, achieving first-class honours in both parts of his tripos.

== Career in civil service ==
Grigg came first in the civil service examination in 1913, and commenced work at the Treasury. During and after the First World War he served successive Chancellors including Winston Churchill. Grigg then became Chairman of the Board of Customs and Excise and Chairman of the Board of Inland Revenue. In 1934, he was transferred to New Delhi, India where he became Finance Member of the Government of India in anticipation of limited self-rule that began in 1935. He remained in New Delhi until 1939, and afterward continued to influence British imperial policies on India, especially after his patron Winston Churchill became Prime Minister. Grigg became Permanent Under-Secretary of State for War in 1939; he oversaw a turbulent department, which in 1940 witnessed no fewer than four different Secretaries of State for War (Leslie Hore-Belisha, Oliver Stanley, Anthony Eden and David Margesson).

== Secretary of State for War ==
Grigg proved an effective departmental head, but it came as a great shock to many when in February 1942 Churchill dismissed Margesson and replaced him with Grigg – who had to convey the news to Margesson himself. Amongst the many Ministerial appointments made by Churchill from outside the sphere of Westminster politics, this was seen as one of the most unusual, but was a response to considerable military setbacks such as the fall of Singapore, and the need to appease critics by replacing some ministers. Grigg retained his post for the rest of the war, holding it also in the Churchill caretaker ministry (May–July 1945). In 1942 he was elected as Member of Parliament (MP) for Cardiff East, beating Fenner Brockway. Alan Brooke the wartime Army CIGS said that with PJ he had the "best and most valuable advice on any matter I discussed with him" (unlike Lawson, who replaced Grigg).

But in the 1945 general election Grigg lost his seat, and retired from public life.

== Later life ==
In his later years Grigg held many directorships, including those of the Imperial Tobacco Company, the Prudential Assurance Company, the National Provincial Bank and the Distillers Company. In 1946, he became the first British executive director of the International Bank for Reconstruction and Development. He died on 5 May 1964, aged 73.

== Family ==
He married Gertrude Charlotte Hough, daughter of the Reverend George Frederick Hough, in July 1919. The marriage was childless.

== Memoir ==
- Grigg, P. J., Prejudice and Judgment. London: Jonathan Cape, 1948.

Government offices
Preceded by Sir Francis Floud	Chairman, Board of Customs and Excise; 1930	Succeeded by Sir Edward Forber
Preceded by Sir Ernest Gowers	Chairman, Board of Inland Revenue; 1930–1934	Succeeded by Sir Edward Forber
Preceded by Sir Herbert Creedy	Permanent Secretary, War Office; 1939–1942	Succeeded by Sir Frederick Bovenschen and Sir Eric Speed
Parliament of the United Kingdom
Preceded by Owen Temple-Morris	Member of Parliament for Cardiff East; 1942–1945	Succeeded by Hilary Marquand
Political offices
Preceded by David Margesson	Secretary of State for War; 1942–1945	Succeeded by Jack Lawson
