= Legal Eight Hours and International Labour League =

The Legal Eight Hours and International Labour League was a London-based organisation set up to facilitate the formation of a distinct Labour Party. It arose from the May Day demonstration organised by the Bloomsbury Socialist Society and the Gas Workers and General Labourers’ Union on Sunday 4 May 1890.
