= 1925 Forest of Dean by-election =

UK Parliamentary by-election

The 1925 Forest of Dean by-election was held on 14 July 1925. The by-election was held due to the death of the incumbent Labour MP, James Wignall. It was won by the Labour candidate A. A. Purcell.

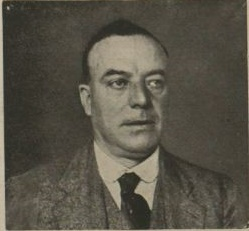
Purcell

Forest of Dean by-election, 1925
Party	Candidate	Votes	%	±%
Labour	A. A. Purcell	11,629	48.5	−4.7
Unionist	Michael Beaumont	8,607	35.8	−11.0
Liberal	W.H. West	3,774	15.7	N/A
Majority		3,022	12.7	+6.3
Turnout		24,010	80.9	+10.9
Labour hold		Swing	+3.1	
