= Trevor Wignall =

Trevor Charles Wignall (1881 - 1958) was an author and sportswriter.

Wignall was a lieutenant at the end of the First World War. His father, James Wignall was an M.P. for the Forest of Dean between 1918 and 1925.

In 1920 he wrote two stories for The Sexton Blake Library: The Case of The Japanese Detective in SBL #119 and The House with the Red Blinds for SBL #143.

Wignall worked for the Cambria Daily Leader, the South Wales Daily Post, the Morning Leader, the Sporting Life and the Daily Mail. He then became the Chief Sportswriter of the Daily Express. While he was at The Daily Express in the 1930s, William Pollock the paper's cricket correspondent, stated that Wignall was earning more than £100 a week.

The New York Times described Wignall as "once of The London Daily Express and at one time Britain's most famous sports writer".

== Bibliography ==
- Wignall, Trevor (1921). The Life Of Commander Sir Edward Nicholl. London: Mills & Boon.
- Wignall, Trevor; Knox, G. D (1923). Atoms. London: Mills & Boon.
- Wignall, Trevor (1923). Thus Gods Are Made. London: Hutchinson.
- Wignall, Trevor (1924). The Story Of Boxing. New York: Brentano's.
- Wignall, Trevor (1924). Comfort O'Connor. London: Hutchinson.
- Wignall, Trevor (1926). The Sweet Science. London: Chapman and Hall, ld.
- Wignall, Trevor (1928). Prides Of The Fancy. London: Eveleigh Nash & Grayson.
- Wignall, Trevor (1939). Sea Green. London: Hutchinson.
- Wignall, Trevor (1939). I Knew Them All. London.
- Wignall, Trevor (1941). Never A Dull Moment. London: Hutchinson.
- Wignall, Trevor (1941). Ringside. London; Melbourne: Hutchinson.
- Wignall, Trevor (1945). One Man's Road. London; New York: Hutchinson.
- Wignall, Trevor (1949). Almost Yesterday. London: Hutchinson.
