= C. G. Lane =

English cricketer

Charlton George "CG" Lane (11 June 1836, Kennington, London – 2 November 1892, Little Gaddesden, Hertfordshire) was an English amateur cricketer who played from 1854 to 1867.

Lane was a student at Christ Church, Oxford, matriculating in 1855, and graduating B.A. in 1860, M.A. in 1867. A right-handed batsman who was mainly associated with Oxford University and Surrey, he made 46 known appearances. He played for several predominantly amateur teams including the Gentlemen in the Gentlemen v Players series.

He became a Church of England clergyman and for 22 years to his death in 1892 he was the rector of Little Gaddesden, Hertfordshire. His brother William also played.
