= 1887 Forest of Dean by-election =

UK parliamentary by-election

The 1887 Forest of Dean by-election was held on 29 July 1887 after the retirement of the incumbent Liberal MP Thomas Blake. The seat was retained by the Liberal candidate Godfrey Blundell Samuelson.

Forest of Dean by-election, 1887
Party	Candidate	Votes	%	±%
Liberal	Godfrey Blundell Samuelson	4,286	61.0	−7.0
Conservative	E Wyndham	2,736	39.0	+7.0
Majority		1,550	22.0	−14.0
Turnout		7,022	70.0	−10.0
Liberal hold		Swing	-7.0	
