= Forest of Dean (constituency) =

Parliamentary constituency in the United Kingdom, 1997 onwards

- County constituency for the House of Commons
- Interactive map of boundaries from 1997
- Boundary within South West England
- County: Gloucestershire
- Electorate: 71,510 (2023)
- Major settlements: Coleford, Cinderford, Lydney

Current constituency
- Created: 1997
- Member of Parliament: Matt Bishop (Labour)
- Seats: One
- Created from: West Gloucestershire

1885–1950
- Seats: One
- Replaced by: West Gloucestershire

Forest of Dean is a constituency (Note: A county constituency (for the purposes of election expenses and type of returning officer)) in Gloucestershire represented in the House of Commons of the UK Parliament since 2024 by Matt Bishop, of the Labour Party. (Note: As with all constituencies, the constituency elects one Member of Parliament (MP) by the first past the post system of election at least every five years.)

== Boundaries ==
1885–1918: The Sessional Divisions of Coleford, Lydney, Newent, and Newnham.

1918–1950: The Urban Districts of Awre, Coleford, Newnham, and Westbury-on-Severn, the Rural Districts of East Dean and United Parishes, Lydney, Newent, and West Dean, and part of the Rural District of Gloucester.

1997–2010: The District of Forest of Dean, and the Borough of Tewkesbury wards of Haw Bridge and Highnam.

2010–present: The District of Forest of Dean, and the Borough of Tewkesbury ward of Highnam with Haw Bridge. The constituency boundaries remained unchanged by the Fifth Periodic Review of Westminster constituencies.

The 2023 review of Westminster constituencies also left the boundaries unchanged.

== History ==
This seat was created for the 1885 general election (replacing the two-seat constituency of West Gloucestershire under the Redistribution of Seats Act 1885), was redrawn for the 1918 general election, and abolished for the 1950 general election. It was re-created, with different boundaries, for the 1997 general election, and has thus far not undergone any boundary changes.

== Constituency profile ==
The Forest of Dean constituency covers Gloucestershire west of the river Severn, and lies in the south west of England, near the Welsh border.

The core of the constituency consists of the Royal Forest of Dean itself, which was established by William the Conqueror nearly a thousand years ago and is one of the last surviving Royal Forests in England. The seat has a rich industrial and mining history, evidenced by the market towns of Coleford and Cinderford, and the old port of Lydney from where coal mined in the Forest of Dean Coalfield would start its journey to all parts of the world.

The Wye Valley forms the western border of the Forest and is an area of outstanding natural beauty, whilst the Leadon Valley forms the northern portion of the constituency. The Vale consists of countryside and farmland centred on the Tudor town of Newent, and also produces English wine.

The constituency also includes parishes from Tewkesbury district, including Forthampton, Chaceley Hole, Hasfield, Ashleworth and Highnam.

== Members of Parliament ==
=== MPs 1885–1950 ===
Election	Member	Party
1885	Thomas Blake	Liberal
1887	Godfrey Samuelson	Liberal
1892	Sir Charles Dilke	Liberal
1911	Sir Henry Webb	Liberal
1918	James Wignall	Labour
1925	A. A. Purcell	Labour
1929	David Vaughan	Labour
1931	John Worthington	National Labour
1935	M. Philips Price	Labour
1950	constituency abolished	

=== MPs since 1997 ===
Election	Member	Party
1997	Diana Organ	Labour
2005	Mark Harper	Conservative
2024	Matt Bishop	Labour

== Elections ==
=== Elections in the 2020s ===
General election 2024: Forest of Dean
Party	Candidate	Votes	%	±%
Labour	Matt Bishop	16,373	34.0	+5.2
Conservative	Mark Harper	16,095	33.5	−26.1
Reform	Stanley Goodin	8,194	17.0	N/A
Green	Chris McFarling	4,735	9.8	+0.7
Liberal Democrats	James Joyce	2,604	5.4	N/A
Socialist Labour	Saiham Sikder	90	0.2	N/A
Majority		278	0.5	N/A
Turnout		48,091	66.0	−6.4
Registered electors		72,052		
Labour gain from Conservative		Swing	+15.7	

=== Elections in the 2010s ===
General election 2019: Forest of Dean
Party	Candidate	Votes	%	±%
Conservative	Mark Harper	30,680	59.6	+5.3
Labour Co-op	Di Martin	14,811	28.8	−7.1
Green	Chris McFarling	4,681	9.1	+6.7
Independent	Julian Burrett	1,303	2.5	+1.4
Majority		15,869	30.8	+12.4
Turnout		51,475	72.4	−0.6
Registered electors		71,438		
Conservative hold		Swing	+6.2	

General election 2017: Forest of Dean
Party	Candidate	Votes	%	±%
Conservative	Mark Harper	28,096	54.3	+7.5
Labour	Shaun Stammers	18,594	35.9	+11.3
Liberal Democrats	Janet Ellard	2,029	3.9	−1.4
Green	James Greenwood	1,241	2.4	−3.1
UKIP	Ernie Warrender	1,237	2.4	−15.4
Independent	Julian Burrett	570	1.1	N/A
Majority		9,502	18.4	−3.8
Turnout		51,767	73.0	+2.1
Registered electors		70,898		
Conservative hold		Swing	−1.9	

General election 2015: Forest of Dean
Party	Candidate	Votes	%	±%
Conservative	Mark Harper	23,191	46.8	−0.1
Labour	Steve Parry-Hearn	12,204	24.6	+0.5
UKIP	Steve Stanbury	8,792	17.8	+12.6
Green	James Greenwood	2,703	5.5	+3.6
Liberal Democrats	Christopher Coleman	2,630	5.3	−16.6
Majority		10,987	22.2	−0.5
Turnout		49,520	70.9	−0.4
Registered electors		69,865		+2.1
Conservative hold		Swing	−0.3	

General election 2010: Forest of Dean
Party	Candidate	Votes	%	±%
Conservative	Mark Harper	22,853	46.9	+6.0
Labour	Bruce Hogan	11,789	24.2	−12.4
Liberal Democrats	Christopher Coleman	10,676	21.9	+4.7
UKIP	Tim Congdon	2,522	5.2	+2.8
Green	James Greenwood	923	1.9	−0.2
Majority		11,064	22.7	+18.4
Turnout		48,763	71.3	+0.4
Registered electors		68,419		+1.7
Conservative hold		Swing	+9.2	

=== Elections in the 2000s ===
General election 2005: Forest of Dean
Party	Candidate	Votes	%	±%
Conservative	Mark Harper	19,474	40.9	+2.1
Labour	Isabel Owen	17,425	36.6	−6.8
Liberal Democrats	Christopher Coleman	8,185	17.2	+4.3
UKIP	Patricia Hill	1,140	2.4	+0.9
Green	Stephen Tweedie	991	2.1	−0.7
Independent	Anthony Reeve	300	0.6	N/A
English Democrat	Gerald Morgan	125	0.3	−0.4
Majority		2,049	4.3	N/A
Turnout		47,640	70.8	+3.5
Registered electors		67,241		+1.5
Conservative gain from Labour		Swing	+4.4	

General election 2001: Forest of Dean
Party	Candidate	Votes	%	±%
Labour	Diana Organ	19,350	43.4	−4.8
Conservative	Mark Harper	17,301	38.8	+3.2
Liberal Democrats	David Gayler	5,762	12.9	+0.6
Green	Simon Pickering	1,254	2.8	N/A
UKIP	Allen Prout	661	1.5	N/A
Independent	Gerald Morgan	279	0.6	+0.2
Majority		2,049	4.6	−8.0
Turnout		44,607	67.3	−11.7
Registered electors		66,240		+4.2
Labour hold		Swing	−4.0	

=== Election in the 1990s ===
General election 1997: Forest of Dean
Party	Candidate	Votes	%	±%
Labour	Diana Organ	24,203	48.2	+5.8
Conservative	Paul Marland	17,860	35.6	−5.5
Liberal Democrats	Anthony Lynch	6,165	12.3	−3.8
Referendum	Dominic Hopkins	1,624	3.2	N/A
Independent	Gerald Morgan	218	0.4	N/A
Independent	Colin Palmer	80	0.2	N/A
Independent	Stephen Porter	34	0.1	N/A
Majority		6,343	12.6	+11.2
Turnout		50,184	79.1	−4.0
Registered electors		63,465		+0.9
Labour hold		Swing	+5.6	

1992 notional result
Party	Vote	%
Labour	22,176	42.4
Conservative	21,444	41.0
Liberal Democrats	8,422	16.1
Others	204	0.4
Turnout	52,246	83.1
Electorate	62,882	

=== Election in the 1940s ===
General election 1945: Forest of Dean
Party	Candidate	Votes	%	±%
Labour	M. Philips Price	19,721	65.2	+7.6
National Independent	John Brown	10,529	34.8	N/A
Majority		9,192	30.4	+15.2
Turnout		30,250	70.9	−6.4
Registered electors		42,667		
Labour hold		Swing		

=== Elections in the 1930s ===
General election 1935: Forest of Dean
Party	Candidate	Votes	%	±%
Labour	M. Philips Price	16,768	57.6	+10.3
National Labour	John Worthington	12,337	42.4	−10.3
Majority		4,431	15.2	N/A
Turnout		29,105	77.3	+0.4
Registered electors		37,643		
Labour gain from National Labour		Swing	+10.3	

General election 1931: Forest of Dean
Party	Candidate	Votes	%	±%
National Labour	John Worthington	14,815	52.7	N/A
Labour	David Vaughan	13,291	47.3	−4.8
Majority		1,524	5.4	N/A
Turnout		28,106	76.9	+3.6
Registered electors		36,547		
National Labour gain from Labour		Swing		

=== Elections in the 1920s ===
General election 1929: Forest of Dean
Party	Candidate	Votes	%	±%
Labour	David Vaughan	13,976	52.1	+3.7
Unionist	William Mitchell-Cotts	7,092	26.5	−9.4
Liberal	Joseph W Westwood	5,738	21.4	+5.7
Majority		6,884	25.7	+13.1
Turnout		26,806	73.3	−7.5
Registered electors		36,563		
Labour hold		Swing	+6.5	

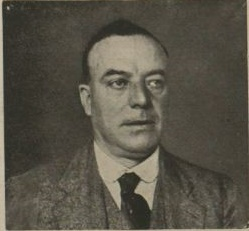
Purcell

1925 Forest of Dean by-election
Party	Candidate	Votes	%	±%
Labour	A. A. Purcell	11,629	48.4	−4.7
Unionist	Michael Beaumont	8,607	35.8	−11.0
Liberal	W.H. West	3,774	15.7	N/A
Majority		3,022	12.6	+6.3
Turnout		24,010	80.9	+10.9
Registered electors		29,696		
Labour hold		Swing	+3.1	

General election 1924: Forest of Dean
Party	Candidate	Votes	%	±%
Labour	James Wignall	11,048	53.1	−7.7
Unionist	Michael Beaumont	9,739	46.9	+7.7
Majority		1,309	6.2	−15.4
Turnout		20,787	70.0	+5.3
Registered electors		29,696		
Labour hold		Swing	−7.7	

General election 1923: Forest of Dean
Party	Candidate	Votes	%	±%
Labour	James Wignall	11,486	60.9	+8.5
Unionist	Augustus Dinnick	7,383	39.1	+10.2
Majority		4,103	21.7	−1.8
Turnout		18,869	64.7	−7.3
Registered electors		29,174		
Labour hold		Swing	−0.9	

Tennant

General election 1922: Forest of Dean
Party	Candidate	Votes	%	±%
Labour	James Wignall	10,820	52.4	−10.4
Ind. Conservative	Augustus Dinnick	5,976	28.9	N/A
National Liberal	Winifred Coombe Tennant	3,861	18.7	N/A
Majority		4,854	23.5	−2.1
Turnout		20,647	72.0	+15.9
Registered electors		28,686		
Labour hold		Swing		

== Election results 1885–1918 ==
=== Elections in the 1910s ===
General election 1918: Forest of Dean
Party		Candidate	Votes	%	±%
	Labour	James Wignall	9,731	62.8	N/A
C	Liberal	Henry Webb	5,765	37.2	N/A
Majority			3,966	25.6	N/A
Turnout			15,496	56.1	N/A
Registered electors			27,624		
	Labour gain from Liberal		Swing		
C indicates candidate endorsed by the coalition government.

General Election 1914–15

A general election was due to take place by the end of 1915. By the autumn of 1914, the following candidates had been selected to contest that election. Due to the outbreak of war, the election never took place;

- Liberal Party: Henry Webb
- Labour Party: James Wignall

1912 Forest of Dean by-election
Party	Candidate	Votes	%	±%
Liberal	Henry Webb	Unopposed		
Liberal hold				

Webb

1911 Forest of Dean by-election
Party	Candidate	Votes	%	±%
Liberal	Henry Webb	6,174	66.5	+0.2
Conservative	David Hope Kyd	3,106	33.5	−0.2
Majority		3,068	33.1	+0.5
Turnout		9,280	82.8	+5.9
Registered electors		11,214		
Liberal hold		Swing	+0.2	

General election December 1910: Forest of Dean
Party	Candidate	Votes	%	±%
Liberal	Charles Dilke	5,544	66.3	+1.1
Conservative	David Hope Kyd	2,820	33.7	−1.1
Majority		2,724	32.6	+2.2
Turnout		8,364	76.9	−9.7
Registered electors		10,881		
Liberal hold		Swing	+1.1	

General election January 1910: Forest of Dean
Party	Candidate	Votes	%	±%
Liberal	Charles Dilke	6,141	65.2	N/A
Conservative	John Henry Renton	3,279	34.8	N/A
Majority		2,862	30.4	N/A
Turnout		9,420	86.6	N/A
Registered electors		10,881		
Liberal hold		Swing	N/A	

=== Elections in the 1900s ===
General election 1906: Forest of Dean
Party	Candidate	Votes	%	±%
Liberal	Charles Dilke	Unopposed		
Liberal hold				

General election 1900: Forest of Dean
Party	Candidate	Votes	%	±%
Liberal	Charles Dilke	4,972	66.4	N/A
Conservative	H Terrell	2,520	33.6	N/A
Majority		2,452	32.7	N/A
Turnout		7,492	75.0	N/A
Registered electors		9,993		
Liberal hold		Swing	N/A	

=== Elections in the 1890s ===
General election 1895: Forest of Dean
Party	Candidate	Votes	%	±%
Liberal	Charles Dilke	Unopposed		
Liberal hold				

Dilke

General election 1892: Forest of Dean
Party	Candidate	Votes	%	±%
Liberal	Charles Dilke	5,360	64.6	+3.5
Conservative	Maynard Wemyss	2,942	35.4	−3.5
Majority		2,418	29.2	+7.1
Turnout		8,302	77.0	+7.0
Registered electors		10,782		
Liberal hold		Swing	+3.5	

=== Elections in the 1880s ===
1887 Forest of Dean by-election
Party	Candidate	Votes	%	±%
Liberal	Godfrey Samuelson	4,286	61.0	−7.0
Conservative	Edward Wyndham	2,736	39.0	+7.0
Majority		1,550	22.1	−14.0
Turnout		7,022	70.0	−10.0
Registered electors		10,032		
Liberal hold		Swing	−7.0	

- Caused by Blake's resignation.

General election 1886: Forest of Dean
Party	Candidate	Votes	%	±%
Liberal	Thomas Blake	3,822	61.3	−6.7
Liberal Unionist	Frederick Louis Lucas	2,415	38.7	+6.7
Majority		1,407	22.6	−13.4
Turnout		6,237	65.9	−14.1
Registered electors		9,458		
Liberal hold		Swing	+6.7	

General election 1885: Forest of Dean
Party	Candidate	Votes	%
Liberal	Thomas Blake	5,143	68.0
Conservative	John Plunkett	2,421	32.0
Majority		2,722	36.0
Turnout		7,564	80.0
Registered electors		9,458	
Liberal win (new seat)			

== See also ==
- Parliamentary constituencies in Gloucestershire
