= James Wignall =

British politician (1856–1925)

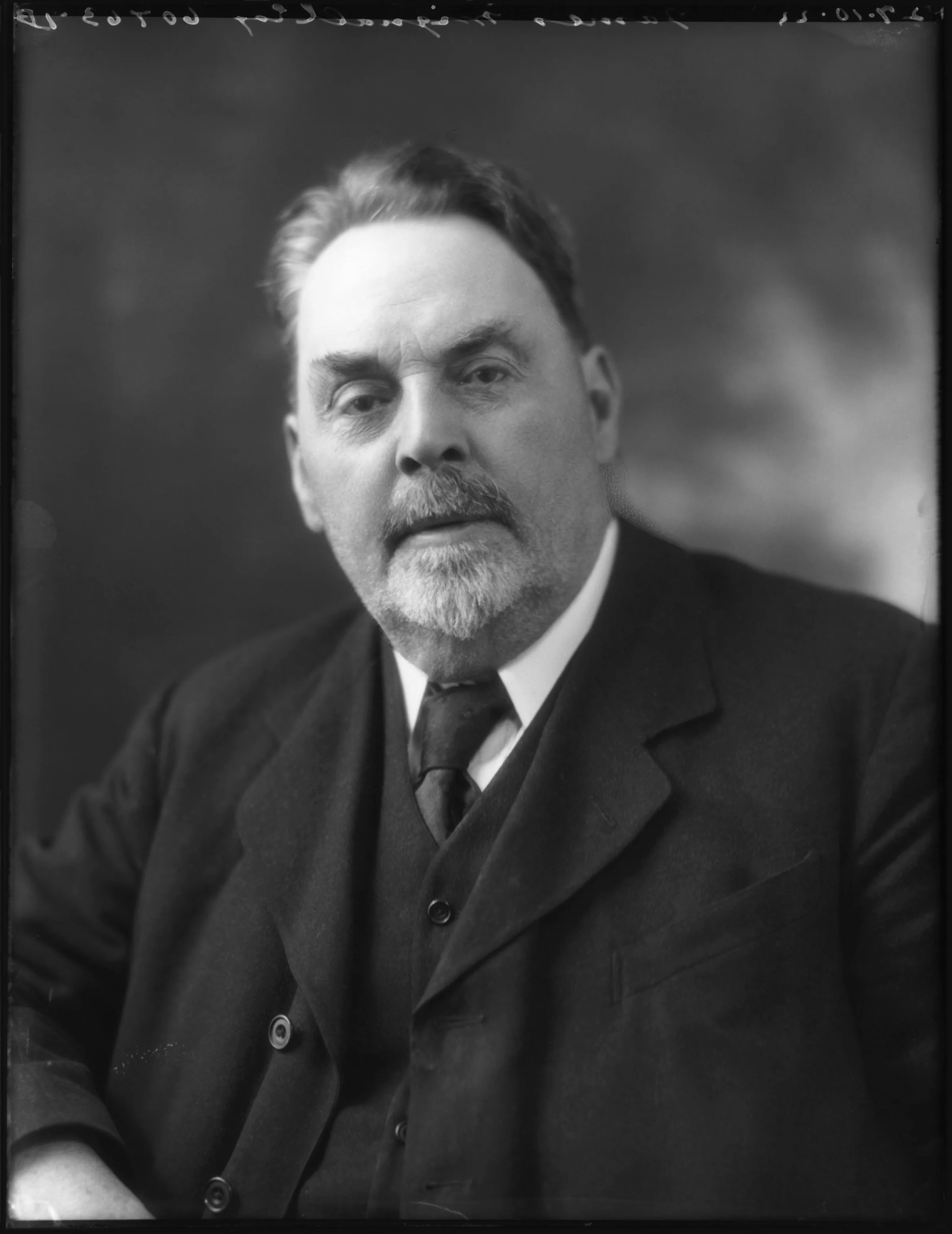
Wignall in 1922

James Wignall (21 July 1856 – 10 June 1925) was a British Labour Party politician. He sat in the House of Commons for seven years from 1918 to 1925.

In 1893 Wignall was appointed Secretary of the Swansea branches of the Dockers' Union and between 1905 and 1908 he was President of the union.

Wignall was first elected at the 1918 general election as the member of parliament (MP) for the Forest of Dean division of Gloucestershire, defeating the sitting Liberal Party MP Sir Henry Webb, Bt. He was re-elected three times, in 1922, 1923 and 1924, and held the seat until his death in June 1925, aged 68. At the resulting by-election on 14 July, the seat was retained for Labour by Albert Arthur Purcell.

Wignall was the father of Trevor Wignall the sportswriter and author.

On 10 June 1925, Wignall collapsed in the corridors of the House of Commons and was taken to hospital, where he died the same day aged 68.

Parliament of the United Kingdom
Preceded by Sir Henry Webb, Bt	Member of Parliament for Forest of Dean; 1918–1925	Succeeded by A. A. Purcell
Trade union offices
Preceded by William Mullin and James O'Grady	Trades Union Congress representative to the American Federation of Labour; 1904; With: William Abraham	Succeeded by David Gilmour and William Mosses
Preceded by J. Howell	President of the Dock, Wharf, Riverside and General Labourers' Union; 1905–1908	Succeeded by J. Howell
