= List of MPs for constituencies in Wales (1924–1929) =

- 29 October 1924
- Colours on map indicate the party allegiance of each constituency's MP.

This is a list of members of Parliament in Wales, elected to the House of Commons of the United Kingdom in the 1924 general election.

== Composition ==
Affiliation	Members
Labour Party	16
Liberal Party	11
Conservative Party	9
Total	36

== MPs ==
MP	Constituency	Party	In constituency since
George Barker	Abertillery	Labour Party	1920 by-election
Reginald Clarry	Newport	Conservative Party	1922 by-election
William Cope	Llandaff and Barry	Conservative Party	1918
David Davies	Montgomeryshire	Liberal Party	1906
Ellis Davies	Denbigh	Liberal Party	1923
Evan Davies	Ebbw Vale	Labour Party	1920 by-election
Charles Edwards	Bedwellty	Labour Party	1918
Arthur Evans	Cardiff South	Conservative Party	1924
Leolin Forestier-Walker	Monmouth	Conservative Party	1918
Thomas Griffiths	Pontypool	Labour Party	1918
John Henry Williams	Llanelly	Labour Party	1922
David Grenfell	Gower	Labour Party	1922
George Hall	Aberdare	Labour Party	1922
Walter Hall	Brecon and Radnor	Conservative Party	1924
Vernon Hartshorn	Ogmore	Labour Party	1918
William Jenkins	Neath	Labour Party	1922
William John	Rhondda West	Labour Party	1920 by-election
Henry Haydn Jones	Merioneth	Liberal Party	January 1910
Morgan Jones	Caerphilly	Labour Party	1921 by-election
Thomas Mardy Jones	Pontypridd	Labour Party	1922 by-election
Clement Kinloch-Cooke	Cardiff East	Conservative Party	1924
David Lloyd George	Caernarvon Boroughs	Liberal Party	1890
Lewis Lougher	Cardiff Central	Conservative Party	1924
Ramsay MacDonald	Aberavon	Labour Party	1922
Alfred Mond	Carmarthen	Liberal Party	1924 by-election
Rhys Hopkin Morris	Cardiganshire	Liberal Party	1923
Goronwy Owen	Caernarvonshire	Liberal Party	1923
Charles Price	Pembrokeshire	Conservative Party	1924
Ernest Roberts	Flintshire	Conservative Party	1924
Walter Runciman	Swansea West	Liberal Party	1924
Robert Thomas	Anglesey	Liberal Party	1923
R. C. Wallhead	Merthyr	Labour Party	1922
Christmas Price Williams	Wrexham	Liberal Party	1924
David Watts-Morgan	Rhondda East	Labour Party	1918
David Williams	Swansea East	Labour Party	1922
Ernest Evans	University of Wales	Liberal Party	1924

== By-elections ==
- 1928 Carmarthen by-election

== See also ==
- List of MPs elected in the 1924 United Kingdom general election
- 1924 United Kingdom general election
- 1924 United Kingdom general election in Wales
