= John Wilkinson Taylor (politician) =

British politician (1855–1934)

Member of Parliament for Chester-le-Street
- In office 1906–1919
- Preceded by: John Hutton
- Succeeded by: Thomas Lawson

Personal details
- Born: 11 August 1855 County Durham, England
- Died: 26 June 1934 (aged 78)
- Party: Labour
- Occupation: Blacksmith; trade unionist; politician

John Wilkinson Taylor (11 August 1855 – 26 June 1934) was a British Labour Party politician.

== Career ==
Taylor began working at the age of nine, and three years later began an apprenticeship as a blacksmith. This enabled him to find work above ground at Dipton Colliery, and he became active in the Durham Colliery Mechanics' Association, eventually becoming its secretary. He also served on the County Durham Mining Federated Board, and as president of the Durham Ages Mineworkers' Homes Association.

Taylor was elected as member of parliament for Chester-le-Street at the 1906 general election, and held the seat until he resigned in 1919 due to ill-health.

Parliament of the United Kingdom
Preceded by Sir James Joicey	Member of Parliament for Chester-le-Street; 1906–1919	Succeeded by Jack Lawson
Trade union offices
Preceded by Launcelot Trotter	General Secretary of the Durham Colliery Mechanics' Association; 1897–1923	Succeeded by W. S. Hall
