= List of MPs elected in the 1924 United Kingdom general election =

1924–1929 Parliament of the United Kingdom
←	1923–1924 Parliament	1929–1931 Parliament	→
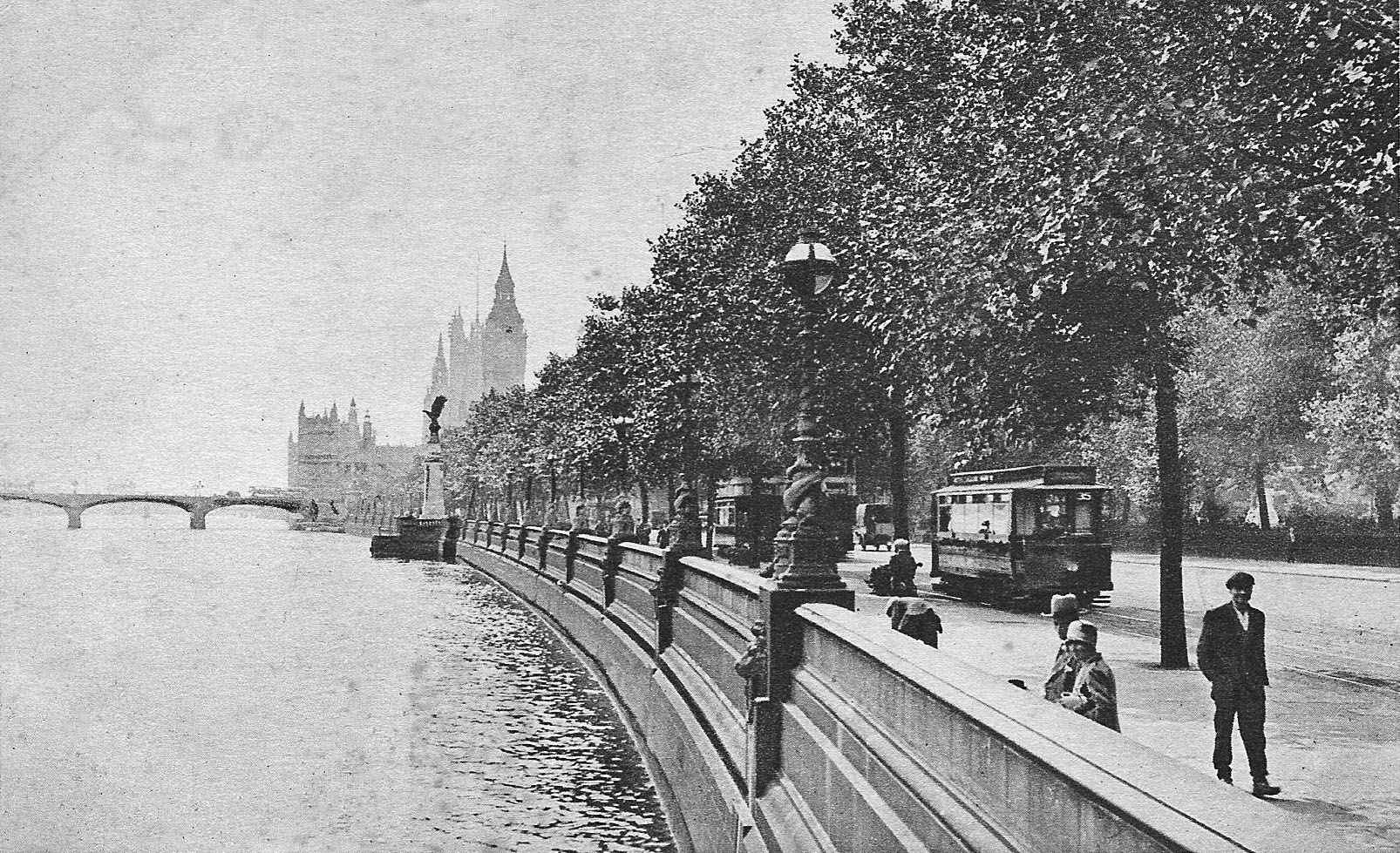
- Palace of Westminster in 1925

Overview
- Legislative body: Parliament of the United Kingdom
- Term: 29 October 1924 – 30 May 1929
- Election: 1924 United Kingdom general election
- Government: Second Baldwin ministry

House of Commons
- Members: 615
- Speaker: John Henry Whitley
- Leader: Stanley Baldwin
- Prime Minister: Stanley Baldwin
- Leader of the Opposition: Ramsay MacDonald
- Third-party leader: H. H. Asquith

House of Lords
- Lord Chancellor: George Cave, 1st Viscount Cave (until 1928); Douglas Hogg, 1st Baron Hailsham (from 1928)
- Leader of the House of Lords: George Curzon, 1st Marquess Curzon of Kedleston (until 1925); James Gascoyne-Cecil, 4th Marquess of Salisbury (from 1925)
- Leader of the Opposition: Richard Haldane, 1st Viscount Haldane (until 1928); Charles Cripps, 1st Baron Parmoor (from 1928)

Crown-in-Parliament George V

Sessions
- 1st: 2 December 1924 – 22 December 1925
- 2nd: 2 February 1926 – 15 December 1926
- 3rd: 8 February 1927 – 22 December 1927
- 4th: 7 February 1928 – 3 August 1928
- 5th: 6 November 1928 – 10 May 1929

This is a complete list of members of Parliament elected at the 1924 general election, held on 29 October.

== A ==
Constituency	Member of Parliament	Party
Aberavon	Rt Hon. Ramsay MacDonald	Labour
Aberdare	George Hall	Labour
Aberdeen North	Frank Rose	Labour
Aberdeen South	Frederick Thomson	Unionist
Aberdeenshire Central	Robert Smith	Unionist
Aberdeenshire East	Robert Boothby	Unionist
Aberdeenshire West and Kincardine	Malcolm Barclay-Harvey	Unionist
Abertillery	George Barker	Labour
Abingdon	Ralph Glyn	Unionist
Accrington	Hugh Edwards	Constitutionalist
Acton	Sir Harry Brittain	Unionist
Aldershot	Viscount Wolmer	Unionist
Altrincham	Cyril Atkinson	Unionist
Anglesey	Sir Robert Thomas, Bt	Liberal
Antrim (Two members)	Charles Craig	Ulster Unionist
Antrim (Two members)	Hon. Hugh O'Neill	Ulster Unionist
Argyll	F. A. Macquisten	Unionist
Armagh	Sir William Allen	Ulster Unionist
Ashford	Samuel Strang Steel	Unionist
Ashton-under-Lyne	Cornelius Homan	Unionist
Aylesbury	Sir Alan Burgoyne	Unionist
Ayr Burghs	The Rt Hon. Sir John Baird, Bt	Unionist
Ayrshire North and Bute	Sir Aylmer Hunter-Weston	Unionist
Ayrshire South	James Brown	Labour
== B ==
Balham and Tooting	Sir Alfred Butt	Unionist
Banbury	Albert Edmondson	Unionist
Banff	William Templeton	Unionist
Barkston Ash	George Lane-Fox	Unionist
Barnard Castle	Cuthbert Headlam	Unionist
Barnsley	John Potts	Labour
Barnstaple	Basil Peto	Unionist
Barrow-in-Furness	John Bromley	Labour
Basingstoke	Sir Arthur Holbrook	Unionist
Bassetlaw	Sir William Hume-Williams	Unionist
Bath	Charles Foxcroft	Unionist
Batley and Morley	Walter Forrest	Liberal
Battersea North	Shapurji Saklatvala	Communist
Battersea South	Viscount Curzon	Unionist
Bedford	Richard Wells	Conservative
Bedfordshire Mid	William Warner	Unionist
Bedwellty	Charles Edwards	Labour
Belfast, East	Herbert Dixon	Ulster Unionist
Belfast, North	Thomas McConnell	Ulster Unionist
Belfast, South	Thomas Moles	Ulster Unionist
Belfast, West	Sir Robert Lynn	Ulster Unionist
Belper	Herbert Wragg	Unionist
Bermondsey West	Alfred Salter	Labour
Berwick-on-Tweed	Mabel Philipson	Unionist
Berwick and Haddington	Chichester Crookshank	Unionist
Bethnal Green North-East	Walter Windsor	Labour
Bethnal Green South-West	Percy Harris	Liberal
Bewdley	The Rt Hon. Stanley Baldwin	Unionist
Birkenhead East	William Henry Stott	Unionist
Birkenhead West	Ellis Nuttall	Unionist
Birmingham Aston	The Rt Hon. Sir Evelyn Cecil	Unionist
Birmingham Deritend	Smedley Crooke	Unionist
Birmingham Duddeston	John Burman	Unionist
Birmingham Edgbaston	Sir Francis Lowe, Bt	Unionist
Birmingham Erdington	Sir Arthur Steel-Maitland, Bt	Unionist
Birmingham Handsworth	Oliver Locker-Lampson	Unionist
Birmingham King's Norton	Robert Dennison	Labour
Birmingham Ladywood	Rt Hon. Neville Chamberlain	Unionist
Birmingham Moseley	Patrick Hannon	Unionist
Birmingham Sparkbrook	Rt Hon. Leo Amery	Unionist
Birmingham West	Rt Hon. Austen Chamberlain	Unionist
Birmingham Yardley	Alfred Jephcott	Unionist
Bishop Auckland	Ben Spoor	Labour
Blackburn (Two members)	John Duckworth	Liberal
Blackburn (Two members)	Sir Sydney Henn	Unionist
Blackpool	Sir Walter de Frece	Unionist
Blaydon	William Whiteley	Labour
Bodmin	Gerald Harrison	Unionist
Bolton (Two members)	Sir Joseph Cunliffe	Unionist
Bolton (Two members)	Cecil Hilton	Unionist
Bootle	Vivian Henderson	Unionist
Bosworth	Robert Gee	Unionist
Bothwell	John Robertson	Labour
Bournemouth	Henry Page Croft	Unionist
Bow and Bromley	George Lansbury	Labour
Bradford Central	Anthony Gadie	Unionist
Bradford East	Thomas Fenby	Liberal
Bradford North	Eugene Ramsden	Unionist
Bradford South	William Hirst	Co-operative
Brecon and Radnor	Walter Hall	Unionist
Brentford and Chiswick	Walter Morden	Unionist
Bridgwater	Brooks Wood	Unionist
Brigg	Sir Berkeley Sheffield, Bt	Unionist
Brighton (Two members)	Rt Hon. George Tryon	Unionist
Brighton (Two members)	Sir Cooper Rawson	Unionist
Bristol Central	Sir Thomas Inskip	Unionist
Bristol East	Walter Baker	Labour
Bristol North	Rt Hon. Freddie Guest	Liberal
Bristol South	Sir Beddoe Rees	Liberal
Bristol West	Rt Hon. George Gibbs	Unionist
Brixton	Sir Davison Dalziel, Bt	Unionist
Bromley	Hon. Cuthbert James	Unionist
Broxtowe	George Spencer	Labour
Buckingham	George Bowyer	Unionist
Buckrose	Sir Guy Gaunt	Unionist
Burnley	Rt Hon. Arthur Henderson	Labour
Burslem	Andrew McLaren	Labour
Burton	John Gretton	Unionist
Bury	Charles Ainsworth	Unionist
Bury St Edmunds	Rt Hon. Walter Guinness	Unionist
== C ==
Caerphilly	Morgan Jones	Labour
Caithness and Sutherland	Sir Archibald Sinclair, Bt	Liberal
Camberwell North	Charles Ammon	Labour
Camberwell North-West	Edward Campbell	Unionist
Camborne	Algernon Moreing	Constitutionalist
Cambridge	Sir George Newton	Unionist
Cambridgeshire	Richard Briscoe	Unionist
Cambridge University (Two members)	Rt Hon. John Rawlinson	Unionist
Cambridge University (Two members)	Sir Geoffrey G. Butler	Unionist
Cannock	William Adamson	Labour
Canterbury	Rt Hon. Ronald McNeill	Unionist
Cardiff Central	Lewis Lougher	Unionist
Cardiff East	Clement Kinloch-Cooke	Unionist
Cardiff South	Arthur Evans	Unionist
Cardiganshire	Rhys Hopkin Morris	Liberal
Carlisle	Rt Hon. William Watson	Unionist
Carmarthen	Rt Hon. Sir Alfred Mond, Bt	Liberal
Carnarvon	Rt Hon. David Lloyd George	Liberal
Carnarvonshire	Goronwy Owen	Liberal
Chatham	John Moore-Brabazon	Unionist
Chelmsford	Sir Henry Curtis-Bennett	Unionist
Chelsea	Rt Hon. Sir Samuel Hoare, Bt	Unionist
Cheltenham	Rt Hon. Sir James Agg-Gardner	Unionist
Chertsey	Philip Richardson	Unionist
Chester	Sir Charles Cayzer, Bt	Unionist
Chesterfield	Barnet Kenyon	Liberal
Chester-le-Street	Jack Lawson	Labour
Chichester	John Courtauld	Unionist
Chippenham	Victor Cazalet	Unionist
Chislehurst	Waldron Smithers	Unionist
Chorley	Douglas Hacking	Unionist
Cirencester and Tewkesbury	Sir Thomas Davies	Unionist
City of London (Two members)	Edward Grenfell	Unionist
City of London (Two members)	Sir Vansittart Bowater, Bt	Unionist
Clapham	Sir John Leigh	Unionist
Clay Cross	Charles Duncan	Labour
Cleveland	Park Goff	Unionist
Clitheroe	William Brass	Unionist
Coatbridge	James C. Welsh	Labour
Colchester	Rt Hon. Sir Laming Worthington-Evans, Bt	Unionist
Colne Valley	Rt Hon. Philip Snowden	Labour
Combined English Universities (Two members)	Sir Martin Conway	Unionist
Combined English Universities (Two members)	Rt Hon. H. A. L. Fisher	Liberal
Combined Scottish Universities (Three members)	Rt Hon. Sir Henry Craik	Unionist
Combined Scottish Universities (Three members)	Dugald Cowan	Liberal
Combined Scottish Universities (Three members)	George Berry	Unionist
Consett	Herbert Dunnico	Labour
Cornwall North	Alfred Williams	Unionist
Coventry	Sir Archibald Boyd-Carpenter	Unionist
Crewe	Ernest Craig	Unionist
Croydon North	Glyn Mason	Unionist
Croydon South	Sir William Mitchell-Thomson, Bt	Unionist
Cumberland North	Hon. Donald Howard	Unionist
== D ==
Darlington	William Edwin Pease	Unionist
Dartford	Angus McDonnell	Unionist
Darwen	Sir Frank Sanderson, Bt	Unionist
Daventry	Rt Hon. Edward FitzRoy	Unionist
Denbigh	Ellis Davies	Liberal
Deptford	Rt Hon. C. W. Bowerman	Labour
Derby (Two members)	Rt Hon. J. H. Thomas	Labour
Derby (Two members)	Sir Richard Luce	Unionist
Derbyshire North-East	Frank Lee	Labour
Derbyshire South	James Augustus Grant	Unionist
Derbyshire West	Marquess of Hartington	Unionist
Devizes	Percy Hurd	Unionist
Dewsbury	Ben Riley	Labour
Doncaster	Wilfred Paling	Labour
Don Valley	Tom Williams	Labour
Dorset East	Gordon Hall Caine	Unionist
Dorset North	Cecil Hanbury	Unionist
Dorset South	Robert Yerburgh	Unionist
Dorset West	Philip Colfox	Unionist
Dover	Hon. John Astor	Unionist
Down (Two members)	David Reid	Ulster Unionist
Down (Two members)	John Simms	Ulster Unionist
Dudley	Cyril Lloyd	Unionist
Dulwich	Sir Frederick Hall, Bt	Unionist
Dumbarton Burghs	David Kirkwood	Labour
Dumfriesshire	John Charteris	Unionist
Dunbartonshire	David Fleming	Unionist
Dundee (Two members)	E. D. Morel	Labour
Dundee (Two members)	Edwin Scrymgeour	Scottish Prohibition
Dunfermline Burghs	William McLean Watson	Labour
Durham	Joshua Ritson	Labour
== E ==
Ealing	Rt Hon. Sir Herbert Nield	Unionist
Eastbourne	Rt Hon. Sir George Lloyd	Unionist
East Grinstead	Sir Henry Cautley	Unionist
East Ham North	Charles Crook	Unionist
East Ham South	Alfred Barnes	Co-operative
Ebbw Vale	Evan Davies	Labour
Eccles	Albert Bethel	Unionist
Eddisbury	Sir Harry Barnston, Bt	Unionist
Edinburgh Central	William Graham	Labour
Edinburgh East	Drummond Shiels	Labour
Edinburgh North	Patrick Ford	Unionist
Edinburgh South	Sir Samuel Chapman	Unionist
Edinburgh West	Ian MacIntyre	Unionist
Edmonton	Frank Broad	Labour
Elland	William C. Robinson	Labour
Enfield	Reginald Applin	Unionist
Epping	Rt Hon. Winston Churchill	Constitutionalist
Epsom	Sir Rowland Blades, Bt	Unionist
Essex South East	Herbert Looker	Unionist
Evesham	Rt Hon. Bolton Eyres-Monsell	Unionist
Exeter	Sir Robert Newman, Bt	Unionist
Eye	Lord Huntingfield	Unionist
== F ==
Fareham	Sir John Davidson	Unionist
Farnham	Arthur Samuel	Unionist
Farnworth	Thomas Greenall	Labour
Faversham	Granville Wheler	Unionist
Fermanagh and Tyrone (Two members)	Sir Charles Falls	Ulster Unionist
Fermanagh and Tyrone (Two members)	James Pringle	Ulster Unionist
Fife East	Hon. Archibald Cochrane	Unionist
Fife West	Rt Hon. William Adamson	Labour
Finchley	Hon. Edward Cadogan	Unionist
Finsbury	George Gillett	Labour
Flintshire	Ernest Roberts	Unionist
Forest of Dean	James Wignall	Labour
Forfarshire	Harry Hope	Unionist
Frome	Geoffrey Peto	Unionist
Fulham East	Kenyon Vaughan-Morgan	Unionist
Fulham West	Sir Cyril Cobb	Unionist
Fylde	Lord Stanley	Unionist
== G ==
Gainsborough	Harry Crookshank	Unionist
Galloway	Sir Arthur Henniker-Hughan, Bt	Unionist
Gateshead	John Beckett	Labour
Gillingham	Sir Gerald Hohler	Unionist
Glasgow Bridgeton	James Maxton	Labour
Glasgow Camlachie	Campbell Stephen	Labour
Glasgow Cathcart	Robert Macdonald	Unionist
Glasgow Central	Sir William Alexander	Unionist
Glasgow Gorbals	George Buchanan	Labour
Glasgow Govan	Neil Maclean	Labour
Glasgow Hillhead	Rt Hon. Sir Robert Horne	Unionist
Glasgow Kelvingrove	Walter Elliot	Unionist
Glasgow Maryhill	James Couper	Unionist
Glasgow Partick	Humphrey Broun-Lindsay	Unionist
Glasgow Pollok	Rt Hon. Sir John Gilmour, Bt	Unionist
Glasgow St. Rollox	James Stewart	Labour
Glasgow Shettleston	Rt Hon. John Wheatley	Labour
Glasgow Springburn	George Hardie	Labour
Glasgow Tradeston	Thomas Henderson	Co-operative
Gloucester	James Horlick	Unionist
Gower	David Grenfell	Labour
Grantham	Sir Victor Warrender, Bt	Unionist
Gravesend	Irving Albery	Unionist
Great Yarmouth	Sir Frank Meyer, Bt	Unionist
Greenock	Sir Godfrey Collins	Liberal
Greenwich	Sir George Hume	Unionist
Grimsby	Walter Womersley	Unionist
Guildford	Sir Henry Buckingham	Unionist
== H ==
Hackney Central	Sir Robert Gower	Unionist
Hackney North	Austin Hudson	Unionist
Hackney South	George Garro-Jones	Liberal
Halifax	Rt Hon. John Henry Whitley	Liberal
Hamilton	Duncan Graham	Labour
Hammersmith North	Ellis Ashmead-Bartlett	Unionist
Hammersmith South	Rt Hon. Sir William Bull, Bt	Unionist
Hampstead	George Balfour	Unionist
Hanley	Samuel Clowes	Labour
Harborough	Lewis Winby	Unionist
Harrow	Isidore Salmon	Unionist
The Hartlepools	Sir Wilfrid Sugden	Unionist
Harwich	Sir Frederick Rice	Unionist
Hastings	Lord Eustace Percy	Unionist
Hemel Hempstead	John Davidson	Unionist
Hemsworth	John Guest	Labour
Hendon	Rt Hon. Sir Philip Lloyd-Greame	Unionist
Henley	Robert Henderson	Unionist
Hereford	Rt Hon. Samuel Roberts	Unionist
Hertford	Murray Sueter	Unionist
Hexham	Douglas Clifton Brown	Unionist
Heywood and Radcliffe	Abraham England	Constitutionalist
High Peak	Sir Samuel Hill-Wood, Bt	Unionist
Hitchin	Guy Kindersley	Unionist
Holborn	Sir James Remnant, Bt	Unionist
Holderness	Samuel Savery	Unionist
Holland-with-Boston	Arthur Dean	Unionist
Honiton	Sir Clive Morrison-Bell, Bt	Unionist
Horncastle	Henry Haslam	Unionist
Hornsey	Euan Wallace	Unionist
Horsham and Worthing	Earl Winterton PC	Unionist
Houghton-le-Spring	Robert Richardson	Labour
Howdenshire	Hon. Stanley Jackson	Unionist
Huddersfield	James Hudson	Labour
Huntingdonshire	Charles Murchison	Unionist
Hythe	Sir Philip Sassoon, Bt	Unionist
== I ==
Ilford	Sir Fredric Wise	Unionist
Ilkeston	George Oliver	Labour
Ince	Rt Hon. Stephen Walsh	Labour
Inverness-shire	Sir Murdoch Macdonald	Liberal
Ipswich	John Ganzoni	Unionist
Isle of Ely	Sir Hugh Lucas-Tooth, Bt	Unionist
Isle of Thanet	Hon. Esmond Harmsworth	Unionist
Isle of Wight	Peter Macdonald	Unionist
Islington East	Robert Tasker	Unionist
Islington North	Sir Henry Cowan	Unionist
Islington South	William Cluse	Labour
Islington West	Frederick Montague	Labour
== J ==
Jarrow	Robert John Wilson	Labour
== K ==
Keighley	Hastings Lees-Smith	Labour
Kennington	George Harvey	Unionist
Kensington North	Percy Gates	Unionist
Kensington South	Sir William Davison	Unionist
Kettering	Sir Mervyn Manningham-Buller, Bt	Unionist
Kidderminster	John Wardlaw-Milne	Unionist
Kilmarnock	Charles MacAndrew	Unionist
King's Lynn	The Lord Fermoy	Unionist
Kingston upon Hull Central	Hon. Joseph Kenworthy	Liberal, then Labour
Kingston upon Hull East	Roger Lumley	Unionist
Kingston upon Hull North West	Lambert Ward	Unionist
Kingston upon Hull South West	Herbert Grotrian	Unionist
Kingston-upon-Thames	George Penny	Unionist
Kingswinford	Charles Sitch	Labour
Kinross & West Perthshire	The Duchess of Atholl	Unionist
Kirkcaldy Burghs	Tom Kennedy	Labour
Knutsford	Ernest Makins	Unionist
== L ==
Lambeth North	Frank Briant	Liberal
Lanark	Stephen Mitchell	Unionist
Lanarkshire North	Sir Alexander Sprot, Bt	Unionist
Lancaster	Sir Gerald Strickland	Unionist
Leeds Central	Sir Charles Wilson	Unionist
Leeds North	Sir Gervase Beckett, Bt	Unionist
Leeds North East	John Birchall	Unionist
Leeds South	Henry Charleton	Labour
Leeds South East	Sir Henry Slesser	Labour
Leeds West	Thomas Stamford	Labour
Leek	William Bromfield	Labour
Leicester East	John Loder	Unionist
Leicester South	Charles Waterhouse	Unionist
Leicester West	Frederick Pethick-Lawrence	Labour
Leigh	Joe Tinker	Labour
Leith	William Wedgwood Benn	Liberal
Leominster	Ernest Shepperson	Unionist
Lewes	Tufton Beamish	Unionist
Lewisham East	Sir Assheton Pownall	Unionist
Lewisham West	Sir Philip Dawson	Unionist
Leyton East	Ernest Alexander	Unionist
Leyton West	James Cassels	Unionist
Lichfield	Roy Wilson	Unionist
Lincoln	Robert Arthur Taylor	Labour
Linlithgow	James Kidd	Unionist
Liverpool East Toxteth	Albert Jacob	Unionist
Liverpool Edge Hill	Jack Hayes	Labour
Liverpool Everton	Herbert Charles Woodcock	Unionist
Liverpool Exchange	Sir Leslie Scott	Unionist
Liverpool Fairfield	Jack Cohen	Unionist
Liverpool Kirkdale	Sir John Pennefather, Bt	Unionist
Liverpool Scotland	Rt Hon. T. P. O'Connor	Irish Nationalist
Liverpool Walton	Sir Warden Chilcott	Unionist
Liverpool Wavertree	John Tinne	Unionist
Liverpool West Derby	John Sandeman Allen	Unionist
Liverpool West Toxteth	Joseph Gibbins	Labour
Llandaff and Barry	William Cope	Unionist
Llanelly	John Henry Williams	Labour
London University	Ernest Graham-Little	Independent
Londonderry	Sir Malcolm Macnaghten	Ulster Unionist
Lonsdale	Lord Balniel	Unionist
Loughborough	Frank Rye	Unionist
Louth	Arthur Heneage	Unionist
Lowestoft	Gervais Rentoul	Unionist
Ludlow	George Windsor-Clive	Unionist
Luton	Terence O'Connor	Unionist
== M ==
Macclesfield	John Remer	Unionist
Maidstone	Carlyon Bellairs	Unionist
Maldon	Edward Ruggles-Brise	Unionist
Manchester Ardwick	Thomas Lowth	Labour
Manchester Blackley	Harold Briggs	Unionist
Manchester Clayton	John Sutton	Labour
Manchester Exchange	Edward Fielden	Unionist
Manchester Gorton	Joseph Compton	Labour
Manchester Hulme	Joseph Nall	Unionist
Manchester Moss Side	Gerald Hurst	Unionist
Manchester Miles Platting	Rt Hon. J. R. Clynes	Labour
Manchester Rusholme	Frank Merriman	Unionist
Manchester Withington	Thomas Watts	Unionist
Mansfield	Frank Varley	Labour
Melton	Lindsay Everard	Unionist
Merioneth	Henry Haydn Jones	Liberal
Merthyr	R. C. Wallhead	Labour
Middlesbrough East	Ellen Wilkinson	Labour
Middlesbrough West	Trevelyan Thomson	Liberal
Middleton and Prestwich	Nairne Stewart Sandeman	Unionist
Midlothian North	George Hutchison	Unionist
Midlothian South and Peebles	Joseph Westwood	Labour
Mitcham	Richard Meller	Unionist
Monmouth	Leolin Forestier-Walker	Unionist
Montgomery	David Davies	Liberal
Montrose Burghs	Sir Robert Hutchison	Liberal
Moray & Nairn	Hon. James Stuart	Unionist
Morpeth	Robert Smillie	Labour
Mossley	Austin Hopkinson	Independent
Motherwell	James Barr	Labour
== N ==
Neath	William Jenkins	Labour
Nelson and Colne	Arthur Greenwood	Labour
Newark	The Marquess of Titchfield	Unionist
Newbury	Howard Clifton Brown	Unionist
Newcastle-under-Lyme	Rt Hon. Josiah Wedgwood	Labour
Newcastle-upon-Tyne Central	Rt Hon. Charles Trevelyan	Labour
Newcastle-upon-Tyne East	Martin Connolly	Labour
Newcastle-upon-Tyne North	Sir Nicholas Grattan-Doyle	Unionist
Newcastle-upon-Tyne West	John Palin	Labour
New Forest and Christchurch	Rt Hon. Wilfrid Ashley	Unionist
Newport	Reginald Clarry	Unionist
Newton	Robert Young	Labour
Norfolk East	Reginald Neville	Unionist
Norfolk North	Rt Hon. Noel Buxton	Labour
Norfolk South	James Christie	Unionist
Norfolk South West	Alan McLean	Unionist
Normanton	Frederick Hall	Labour
Northampton	Sir Arthur Holland	Unionist
Northwich	Lord Colum Crichton-Stuart	Unionist
Norwich (Two members)	Rt Hon. Hilton Young	Liberal
Norwich (Two members)	Griffyth Fairfax	Unionist
Norwood	Walter Greaves-Lord	Unionist
Nottingham Central	Albert Bennett	Unionist
Nottingham East	Edmund Brocklebank	Unionist
Nottingham South	Lord Henry Cavendish-Bentinck	Unionist
Nottingham West	Arthur Hayday	Labour
Nuneaton	Arthur Hope	Unionist
== O ==
Ogmore	Rt Hon. Vernon Hartshorn	Labour
Oldham (Two members)	Duff Cooper	Unionist
Oldham (Two members)	Sir Edward Grigg	Liberal
Orkney and Shetland	Sir Robert Hamilton	Liberal
Ormskirk	Francis Blundell	Unionist
Oswestry	Rt Hon. William Bridgeman	Unionist
Oxford	Robert Bourne	Unionist
Oxford University (Two members)	Rt Hon. Lord Hugh Cecil	Unionist
Oxford University (Two members)	Sir Charles Oman	Unionist
== P ==
Paddington North	Sir William Perring	Unionist
Paddington South	Douglas King	Unionist
Paisley	Edward Mitchell	Labour
Peckham	Hugh Dalton	Labour
Pembrokeshire	Charles Price	Unionist
Penistone	Rennie Smith	Labour
Penrith and Cockermouth	Arthur Dixey	Unionist
Penryn and Falmouth	George Pilcher	Unionist
Perth	Noel Skelton	Unionist
Peterborough	Sir Henry Brassey, Bt	Unionist
Petersfield	William Graham Nicholson	Unionist
Plymouth Devonport	Leslie Hore-Belisha	Liberal
Plymouth Drake	Sir Arthur Benn	Unionist
Plymouth Sutton	Nancy Astor	Unionist
Pontefract	Christopher Brooke	Unionist
Pontypool	Thomas Griffiths	Labour
Pontypridd	Thomas Mardy Jones	Labour
Poplar South	Samuel March	Labour
Portsmouth Central	Sir Harry Foster	Unionist
Portsmouth North	Sir Bertram Falle, Bt	Unionist
Portsmouth South	Sir Herbert Cayzer, Bt	Unionist
Preston (Two members)	Rt Hon. Tom Shaw	Labour
Preston (Two members)	Alfred Ravenscroft Kennedy	Unionist
Pudsey and Otley	Sir Francis Watson	Unionist
Putney	Samuel Samuel	Unionist
== Q ==
Queen's University of Belfast	Thomas Sinclair	Ulster Unionist
== R ==
Reading	Herbert Williams	Unionist
Reigate	Sir George Cockerill	Unionist
Renfrewshire, East	Alexander MacRobert	Unionist
Renfrewshire, West	McInnes Shaw	Unionist
Rhondda East	David Watts-Morgan	Labour
Rhondda West	William John	Labour
Richmond (Yorkshire)	Murrough Wilson	Unionist
Richmond upon Thames	Sir Newton Moore	Unionist
Ripon	Rt Hon. Edward Wood	Unionist
Rochdale	William Kelly	Labour
Romford	Hon. Charles Rhys	Unionist
Ross and Cromarty	Rt Hon. Ian Macpherson	Liberal
Rossendale	Robert Waddington	Unionist
Rotherham	Fred Lindley	Labour
Rotherhithe	Ben Smith	Labour
Rother Valley	Thomas Walter Grundy	Labour
Rothwell	William Lunn	Labour
Roxburgh and Selkirk	The Earl of Dalkeith	Unionist
Royton	Arthur Davies	Unionist
Rugby	David Margesson	Unionist
Rushcliffe	Henry Betterton	Unionist
Rutland and Stamford	Neville Smith-Carington	Unionist
Rutherglen	William Wright	Labour
Rye	George Courthope	Unionist
== S ==
Saffron Walden	William Foot Mitchell	Unionist
St Albans	Francis Fremantle	Unionist
St Helens	James Sexton	Labour
St Ives	Anthony Hawke	Unionist
St Marylebone	Rt Hon. Sir Douglas Hogg	Unionist
St Pancras North	Ian Fraser	Unionist
St Pancras South East	John Hopkins	Unionist
St Pancras South West	Richard Barnett	Unionist
Salford North	Samuel Finburgh	Unionist
Salford South	Edmund Ashworth Radford	Unionist
Salford West	Fred Astbury	Unionist
Salisbury	Hugh Morrison	Unionist
Scarborough and Whitby	Sidney Herbert	Unionist
Seaham	Rt Hon. Sidney Webb	Labour
Sedgefield	Leonard Ropner	Unionist
Sevenoaks	Walter Styles	Unionist
Sheffield Attercliffe	Cecil Wilson	Labour
Sheffield, Brightside	Arthur Ponsonby	Labour
Sheffield, Central	Rt Hon. James Hope	Unionist
Sheffield, Ecclesall	Albert Harland	Unionist
Sheffield, Hallam	Sir Frederick Sykes	Unionist
Sheffield, Hillsborough	A. V. Alexander	Co-operative
Sheffield, Park	Richard Storry Deans	Unionist
Shipley	William Mackinder	Labour
Shoreditch	Ernest Thurtle	Labour
Shrewsbury	Viscount Sandon	Unionist
Skipton	Ernest Bird	Unionist
Smethwick	John Davison	Labour
Southampton (Two members)	Lord Apsley	Unionist
Southampton (Two members)	Edwin Perkins	Unionist
Southend-on-Sea	Viscount Elveden	Unionist
South Molton	Cedric Drewe	Unionist
Southport	Godfrey White	Unionist
South Shields	Edward Harney	Liberal
Southwark Central	Harry Day	Labour
Southwark North	Leslie Haden-Guest	Labour
Southwark South East	Thomas Naylor	Labour
Sowerby	Geoffrey Shaw	Unionist
Spelthorne	Philip Pilditch	Unionist
Spennymoor	Joseph Batey	Labour
Spen Valley	Rt Hon. Sir John Simon	Liberal
Stafford	Hon. William Ormsby-Gore	Unionist
Stalybridge and Hyde	Edmund Wood	Unionist
Stepney Limehouse	Clement Attlee	Labour
Stepney Mile End	John Scurr	Labour
Stirling and Falkirk Burghs	Hugh Murnin	Labour
Stirlingshire East and Clackmannan	MacNeill Weir	Labour
Stirlingshire West	Guy Fanshawe	Unionist
Stockport (Two members)	William Greenwood	Unionist
Stockport (Two members)	Samuel Hammersley	Unionist
Stockton on Tees	Harold Macmillan	Unionist
Stoke Newington	George Jones	Unionist
Stoke-on-Trent	John Ward	Constitutionalist
Stone	Joseph Lamb	Unionist
Stourbridge	Douglas Pielou	Unionist
Streatham	Sir William Lane-Mitchell	Unionist
Stretford	Sir Thomas Robinson	Constitutionalist
Stroud	Sir Frank Nelson	Unionist
Sudbury	Rt Hon. Henry Burton	Unionist
Sunderland (Two members)	Luke Thompson	Unionist
Sunderland (Two members)	Walter Raine	Unionist
Surrey East	James Galbraith	Unionist
Swansea East	David Williams	Labour
Swansea West	Rt Hon. Walter Runciman	Liberal
Swindon	Reginald Banks	Unionist
== T ==
Tamworth	Sir Edward Iliffe	Unionist
Taunton	Andrew Gault	Unionist
Tavistock	Philip Kenyon-Slaney	Unionist
Thirsk and Malton	Edmund Turton	Unionist
Thornbury	Derrick Gunston	Unionist
Tiverton	Gilbert Acland-Troyte	Unionist
Tonbridge	Herbert Spender-Clay	Unionist
Torquay	Charles Williams	Unionist
Totnes	Samuel Harvey	Unionist
Tottenham North	Robert Morrison	Co-operative
Tottenham South	Patrick Malone	Unionist
Twickenham	Rt Hon. Sir William Joynson-Hicks, Bt	Unionist
Tynemouth	Alexander Russell	Unionist
== U ==
University of Wales	Ernest Evans	Liberal
Uxbridge	Dennistoun Burney	Unionist
== W ==
Wakefield	Robert Ellis	Unionist
Wallasey	Sir Robert Burton-Chadwick	Unionist
Wallsend	Sir Patrick Hastings	Labour
Walsall	William Preston	Unionist
Walthamstow East	Rt Hon. Sir Hamar Greenwood, Bt	Constitutionalist
Walthamstow West	Horace Crawfurd	Liberal
Wandsworth Central	Henry Jackson	Unionist
Wansbeck	George Warne	Labour
Warrington	Alec Cunningham-Reid	Unionist
Warwick and Leamington	Anthony Eden	Unionist
Waterloo	Malcolm Bullock	Unionist
Watford	Dennis Herbert	Unionist
Wednesbury	Alfred Short	Labour
Wellingborough	William Cove	Labour
Wells	Sir Robert Sanders	Unionist
Wentworth	George Harry Hirst	Labour
West Bromwich	Rt Hon. Frederick Roberts	Labour
Westbury	Walter Shaw	Unionist
Western Isles	Alexander Livingstone	Liberal
West Ham Plaistow	Will Thorne	Labour
West Ham Silvertown	Jack Jones	Labour
West Ham Stratford	Thomas Groves	Labour
West Ham Upton	Herbert Paton Holt	Unionist
Westhoughton	Rhys Davies	Labour
Westminster Abbey	Otho Nicholson	Unionist
Westminster St George's	James Erskine	Unionist
Westmorland	Hon. Oliver Stanley	Unionist
Weston-super-Mare	John Erskine	Unionist
Whitechapel and St Georges	Harry Gosling	Labour
Whitehaven	Robert Hudson	Unionist
Widnes	Christopher Clayton	Unionist
Wigan	John Parkinson	Labour
Willesden East	Hon. George Stanley	Unionist
Willesden West	Samuel Viant	Labour
Wimbledon	Sir John Power, Bt	Unionist
Winchester	George Hennessy	Unionist
Windsor	Annesley Somerville	Unionist
Wirral	John Grace	Unionist
Wolverhampton Bilston	John Baker	Labour
Wolverhampton East	George Thorne	Liberal
Wolverhampton West	Robert Bird	Unionist
Woodbridge	Sir Arthur Churchman, Bt	Unionist
Wood Green	Godfrey Locker-Lampson	Unionist
Woolwich East	Harry Snell	Labour
Woolwich West	Sir Kingsley Wood	Unionist
Worcester	Crawford Greene	Unionist
Workington	Tom Cape	Labour
The Wrekin	Thomas Oakley	Unionist
Wrexham	Christmas Price Williams	Liberal
Wycombe	Sir Alfred Knox	Unionist
== Y ==
Yeovil	George Davies	Unionist
York	Sir John Marriott	Unionist

== By-elections ==
See the list of United Kingdom by-elections.

== Sources ==
Data from Oliver & Boyd's Edinburgh Almanac, 1927.

== See also ==
- UK general election, 1924
- List of parliaments of the United Kingdom
- Category:UK MPs 1924–1929
- List of MPs for constituencies in Wales (1924–1929)
