= Lord Lawson =

Lord Lawson may refer to:

- Jack Lawson, 1st Baron Lawson (1881–1965), British trade unionist and Labour politician
- Nigel Lawson, Baron Lawson of Blaby (1932–2023), British journalist and Conservative politician
