= 1924 United Kingdom general election in England =

- 29 October 1924

All 492 English seats to the House of Commons
- Turnout: 77.4% (▲6.3 pp)
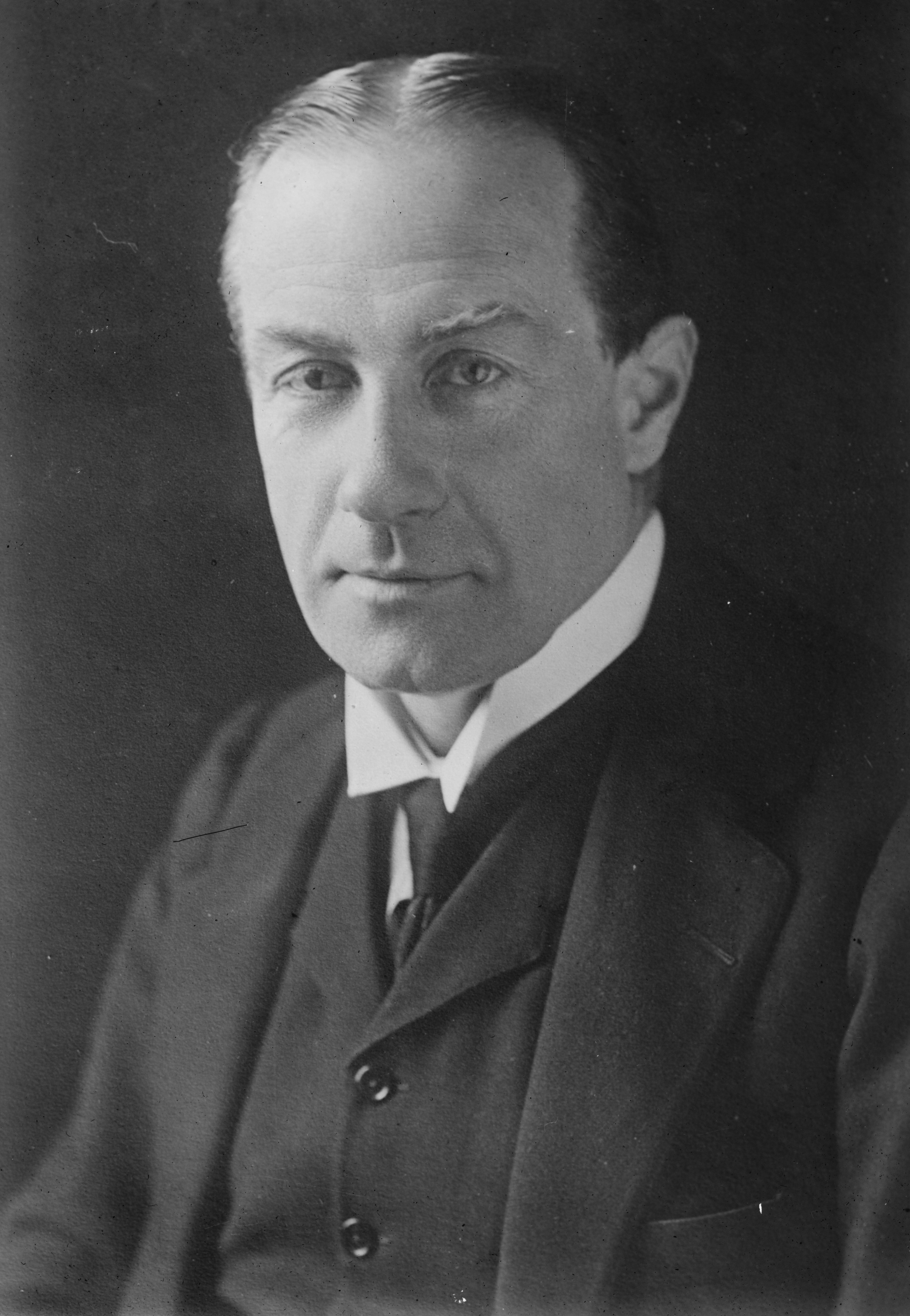

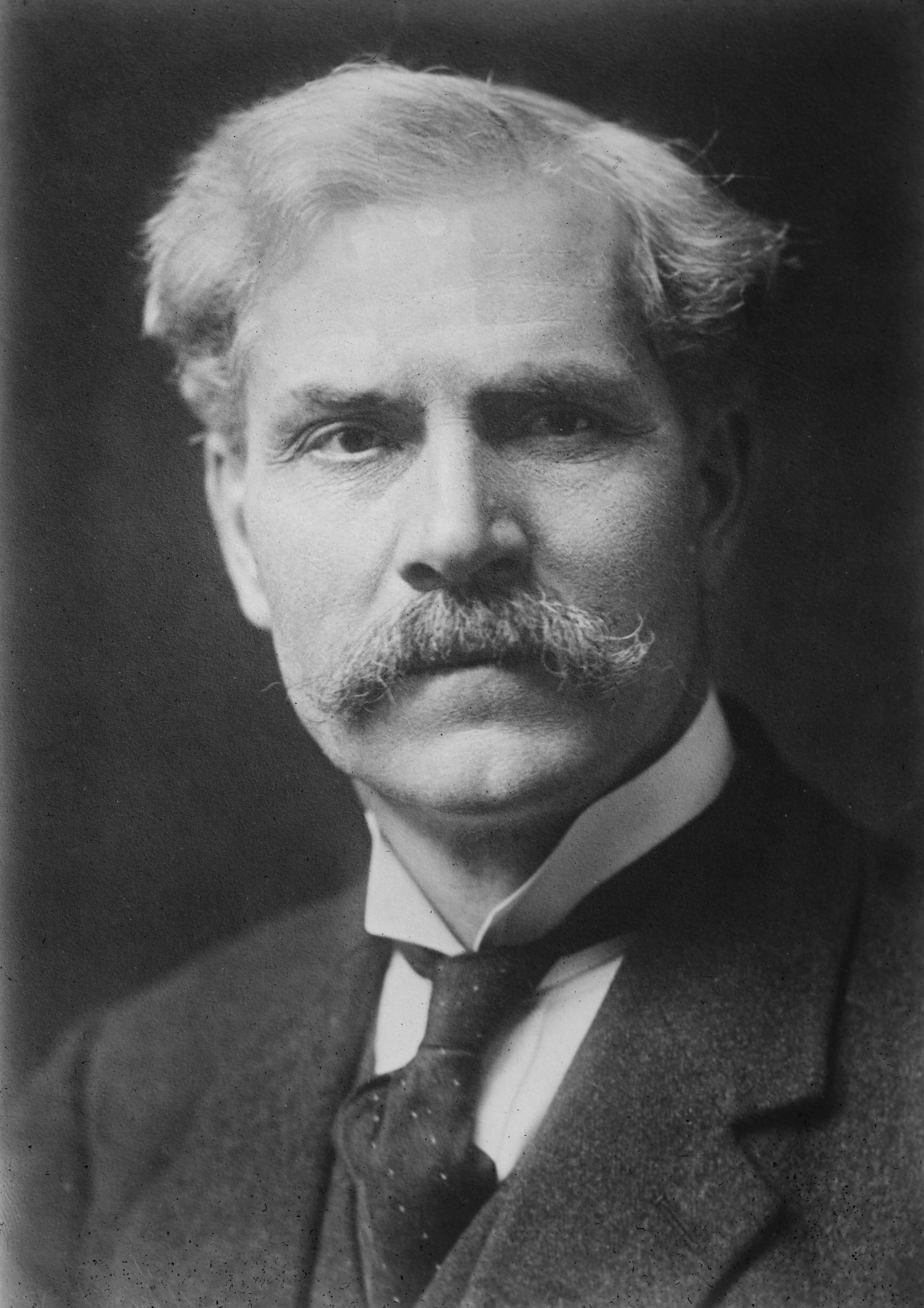

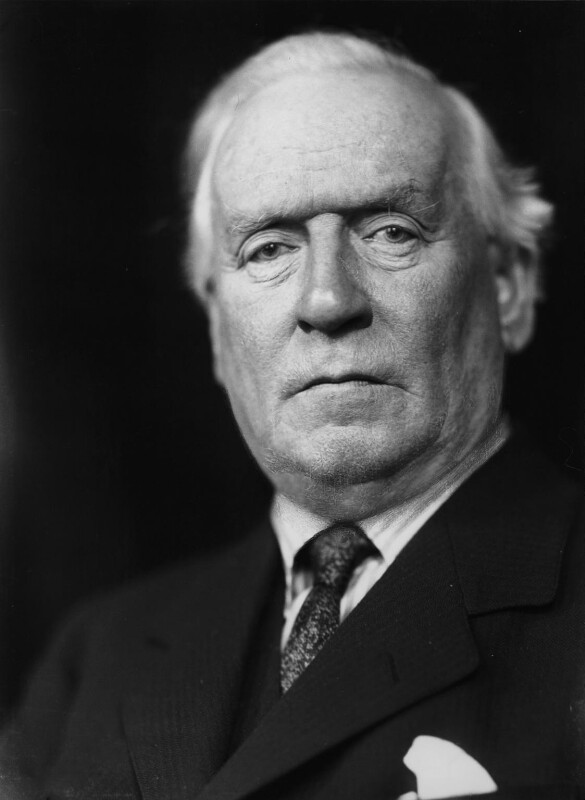
	First party	Second party	Third party
Leader	Stanley Baldwin	Ramsay MacDonald	H. H. Asquith
Party	Conservative	Labour	Liberal
Leader since	23 May 1923	22 November 1922	30 April 1908
Leader's seat	Bewdley	Aberavon	Paisley (lost seat)
Last election	227 seats, (Note: Combined results for county, borough and university seats.) 39.8%	138 seats, 29.7%	124 seats, 29.9%
Seats won	352	109	20 (Note: Figure includes Speaker of the House of Commons John Henry Whitley in Halifax.)
Seat change	▲125	▼29	▼104
Popular vote	6,460,266 (Note: Total and percentage votes given here are for territorial constituencies only.)	4,467,236	2,388,429
Percentage	47.7%	32.8%	17.6%
Swing	▲7.9 pp	▲3.1 pp	▼12.3 pp

On Wednesday 29 October 1924, the 1924 United Kingdom general election was held in England, to elect all 615 members of the House of Commons, with 492 constituencies being in England. 485 seats represented territorial constituencies contested under the first past the post electoral system, and seven additional seats represented the university constituencies. Three university constituencies returned two members through the single transferable vote electoral system and one returned one member by the first past the post system.

It was the third general election to be held in less than two years. Parliament was dissolved on 9 October. Following the decision to withdraw the prosecution of Communist John Ross Campbell under the Incitement to Mutiny Act 1797 by Prime Minister Ramsay MacDonald on 13 August 1924, a motion was passed against the government on 8 October 1924. Despite not being framed as such, this was regarded by the Government as a loss of a motion of no confidence and caused the dissolution of Parliament on 9 October 1924 with new elections being called.

It was the first in which party leaders would give political broadcasts over radio during an general election campaign.

Although the election saw an increase of support for Labour by vote share in England, Labour's election loss across the United Kingdom to the Conservative Party, along with a collapse in Liberal support in England and Scotland, brought an end to the first Labour Government.

== Candidates ==
Below is a table summarising the candidates of the 1924 general election in England, excluding those in the university constituencies.

Affiliation	Candidates
Conservative and Unionist Party	440
Labour Party	406
Liberal Party	280
Constitutionalist	12 (Note: Under this category, the candidates that stood were J. Hugh Edwards in Accrington, Henry Hogbin in Battersea North, William Allen in Burslem, Algernon Moreing in Camborne, James E. Davies in Consett, Hamar Greenwood in Walthamstow East, Winston Churchill in Epping, Abraham England in Heywood and Radcliffe, Charles Edgar Loseby in Nottingham West, John Ward in Stoke-on-Trent, Thomas Robinson in Stretford and John Sturrock in Tottenham North.)
Co-operative Party	8
Communist Party of Great Britain	6 (Note: The candidates that stood were Shapurji Saklatvala in Battersea North, Robert Dunstan in Birmingham West, William Paul in Manchester Rusholme, Tom Mann in Nottingham East, Joe Vaughan in Bethnal Green South West and Alfred M. Wall in Streatham.)
Independent	5 (Note: The candidates that stood were W. E. Mashford in Kingston upon Hull East, Kenneth Burke in Manchester Withington, Austin Hopkinson in Mossley, Albert Taylor in Sheffield Ecclesall and J. J. Lynch in Walsall.)
Nationalist Party	1 (Note: Candidate T. P. O'Connor stood in Liverpool Scotland.)
Democratic labour	1 (Note: Candidate Mary Richardson stood in Acton.)
Total	1,159

== Analysis ==
=== Major Parties ===
The Conservative Party won the greatest number of seats at the election, having won an overall of 352 with an increase of 125 seat from the previous election, and taking much of its vote share against the collapse in Liberal Party support. The party did suffer some losses, including losing two seats to the Constitutionalist candidates and one seat to an independent in London University seat. It also lost Barrow and Furness, Liverpool West Toxteth, Lincoln, Peckham, Bilston and Birmingham King's Norton in England. The Conservative Party itself only suffered three other losses across the United Kingdom. These were the associated Unionist Party losing Motherwell in Scotland, and the associated Ulster Unionist Party losing both seat in Fermanagh and Tyrone. The Conservatives as a whole were returned to a majority Government at this election, having lose the previous election.

The Labour Party, although had also increased its vote share at this election at the expense of the Liberal Party, lost seats. Labour lost a total of 29 seats in England (the majority of its total 40 losses across the United Kingdom) down to 109 seats total in England. The Co-operative Party, which was under the Labour Party Whip retained three of its four existing seats, however once again lost Kettering. The Co-operative Party did gain Bradford South, reaming at four seats.

Labour did however, along with its minor seat gains from the Conservative Party, gain seats from the Liberal Party. It gained from the Liberal Party Gateshead, Rochdale, Bermondsey West, Southwark Central, Newcastle upon Tyne East, Newcastle upon Tyne West, Burslem, Middlesbrough East, Elland, Keighley, Penistone, Bradford South and Dewsbury. Additionally, former Leader of the Labour Party Arthur Henderson returned to Parliament after having lost two separate seats in 1922 and 1923 United Kingdom general election. Henderson had won Burnley in the 1924 Burnley by-election following the death of the Labour incumbent, and represented no change in seats for the previous election. He would take on the ministerial role of Home Secretary under MacDonald's Government, and later return as Leader of the Labour Party until 1931. He would also hold the seat until 1931.

The Liberal Party lost 109 seats in England at this election, with is vote share dropping by just over 12 per cent. It did gain seats from the Labour Party. These were Walthamstow West, Bristol North, Hackney South, Bradford East and Batley and Morley. It also took one of the two seats in Norwich, having won and held the other from the previous election. However, the party overall nationally along with its losses in Scotland and Wales was reduced to 40 seats.

=== Constitutionalists ===
12 candidates stood under the label of 'Constitutionalist' at this election. This was a label primarily given to former members and supporters of David Lloyd George's Coalition Liberal Party and National Liberal Party, who wished to reconcile the closer working ties between the Conservative Party and the Liberals.

Among the successful candidates under this label was Winston Churchill, who won the seat of Epping unopposed by the Conservative Party. Churchill, who was a member and former Deputy Leader for the National Liberals had previously lost Dundee in Scotland in 1922, and unsuccessfully ran in Leicester West in England in the previous election. Hamar Greenwood also won Walthamstow East, and was also not opposed by the Conservative in the seat. Algernon Moreing in Camborne won his seat in the same manner. Both seat gains by Churchill, Greenwood and Moreing were, however, gains from the Conservative Party when compared to the previous election. Other of such Constitutionalist candidates that took seats at the election include J. Hugh Edwards in Accrington, Abraham England in Heywood and Radcliffe, Thomas Robinson in Stretford and John Ward in Stoke-on-Trent. These candidates were opposed by neither the Conservatives or Liberals, but won seats from the Liberal Party in their incumbency due to switching from the Liberal Party. Accordingly, seven of the 12 Constitutionalists that ran won seats at this election.

=== Minor parties and independents ===
Among the independents, the prior independent-held seat of Harrow was won by Conservative candidate Isidore Salmon from Oswald Mosley. Mosley had joined the Labour Party since the last election, having won the seat in the last election after having left the Conservative Party. Mosley unsuccessfully attempted to run in Birmingham Ladywood against future Prime Minister Neville Chamberlain, though came within 100 votes of Chamberlain. Austin Hopkinson retained his seat once again in Mossley, increasing his majority due to a split between the Labour and Liberal vote in his seat. Ernest Graham-Little won the seat at the London University, and would hold the seat until its abolition in 1950.

Shapurji Saklatvala won Battersea North. Although once the official candidate in the seat for the Labour Party in 1922 and 1923, Saklatvala stood as a solely Communist candidate in the seat in this election. After having won his seat in 1922, and losing it in 1923, he regained it at this election. This represented seat a loss against the incumbent Liberal Henry Hogbin in the seat, although Hogbin ran as under the Constitutionalist candidate label at this election. Notably, Communist candidate Robert Dunstan stood in Birmingham West against Conservative Member of Parliament and half-brother to Neville Chamberlain, Austen Chamberlain, however Chamberlain retained the seat with a substantially increased majority. Irish Nationalist T. P. O'Connor once again won Liverpool Scotland unopposed.

== Seat summary ==
Below is a table summarising the total number of seats, gains and losses for each party in both the territorial county and borough constituencies and the English university constituencies.

Party	Seats				
Party	Total	Gains	Losses	Net	Of all (%)
Conservative	352	134	9	▲125	71.5
Labour (Total)	109	19	48	▼29	22.2
Labour	105	18	47	▼29	21.3
Co-operative Party	4	1	1	Steady	0.8
Liberal	20	6	110	▼104	4.1
Constitutionalist	7	7	0	▲7	1.4
Independent	2	1	1	Steady	0.4
Communist	1	Did not stand in 1923		▲1	0.2
Irish Nationalist	1	0	0	Steady	0.2
Total	492				

== County and borough constituency results ==
Below is a table summarising the constituency results of the 1924 general election in England, excluding the result in the university constituencies.

Party	Seats					Aggregate votes		
Party	Total	Gains	Losses	Net	Of all (%)	Total	Of all (%) (Note: Adjusted for multi-member constituencies.)	Change (%)
Conservative	347	134	8	▲126	71.5	6,640,266	47.7	▲7.9
Labour (Total)	109	19	48	▼29	22.5	4,467,236	32.8	▲3.1
Labour	105	18	47	▼29	21.6	4,362,078	32.0	▲3.0
Co-operative Party	4	1	1	Steady	0.8	105,158	0.8	▲0.1
Liberal	19	6	110	▼104	3.9	2,388,429	17.6	▼12.3
Constitutionalist	7	7	0	▲7	1.4	185,075	1.4	▲1.3
Communist	1 (Note: Shapurji Saklatvala in Battersea North.)	Did not stand in 1923		▲1	0.2	39,416	0.3	—N/a
Independent	1 (Note: Austin Hopkinson in Mossley.)	0	1 (Note: Oswald Mosley in Harrow, though he stood as a Labour Party candidate in Birmingham Ladywood.)	▼1	0.2	19,361	0.1	▼0.2
Democratic Labour	0	New			—	1,775	0.0	New
Irish Nationalist	1 (Note: T. P. O'Connor in Liverpool Scotland.)	0	0	Steady	0.2	0	0.0	▼0.1
Total	485			0	100.0	13,561,558	100.0	0.0
Registered voters, and turnout						16,859,134 (Note: Electorate in contested constituencies. The total electorate was 17,471,109.)	77.4	▲6.3

Popular vote
Conservative	47.7%
Labour	32.8%
Liberal	17.6%
Constitutionalist	1.4%
Other	0.4%

Parliament seats
Conservative	71.5%
Labour	22.5%
Liberal	3.9%
Constitutionalist	1.4%
Other	0.6%

== University constituency results ==
=== University results summary ===
Below is a table summarising the seats and vote share of the English university constituencies in the 1924 general election.

Party	Seats				First preference votes	
Party	Total	Gains	Losses	Net	Total	Of all (%)
Conservative	5	0	1	▼1	19,697	58.6
Independent	1	Did not stand in 1923		▲1	5,845	17.4
Independent Liberal	0	0	0	Steady	3,241	9.6
Liberal	1	0	0	Steady	2,872	8.5
Labour	0	0	0	Steady	1,948	5.8
Total	7				33,603	

=== Cambridge University ===
The constituency for Cambridge University returned two Members of Parliament using the single transferable vote electoral system. The electorate consisted of graduates of the university.

General election 1923: Cambridge University (2 seats)
Party	Candidate	FPv%	Count
Party	Candidate	FPv%	1
Conservative	John Rawlinson	38.60	4,569
Conservative	Geoffrey G. Butler	34.01	4,026
Independent Liberal	J. R. M. Butler	27.38	3,241
Electorate: 16,621 Valid: 11,836 Quota: 3,946 Turnout: 71.21%

=== Combined English Universities ===
The Combined English Universities constituency, which represented effectively all red brick universities and Durham University, returned two Members of Parliament using the single transferable vote electoral system. The electorate consisted of graduates of the university.

General Election 1924: Combined English Universities (2 seats)
Party	Candidate	FPv%	Count	
Party	Candidate	FPv%	1	2
Unionist	Martin Conway	50.4	2,231	
Liberal	H. A. L. Fisher	30.1	1,333	2,064
Labour	Joseph John Findlay	19.5	861	885
Electorate: 5,655 Valid: 4,425 Quota: 1,476 Turnout: 78.2%

=== London University ===
The constituency for London University returned one Member of Parliament using the First-past-the-post electoral system. The electorate consisted of graduates of the university.

General election 1924: London University
Party	Candidate	Votes	%	±%
Independent	Ernest Graham-Little	3,202	37.06	+37.06
Unionist	John Bradford	2,813	32.55	−17.60
Liberal	Albert Pollard	1,539	17.81	−14.40
Labour	Frank George Bushnell	1,087	12.58	−5.06
Majority		389	4.51	N/A
Turnout		8,641	72.03	+0.75
Registered electors		11,997		
Independent gain from Unionist		Swing		

=== Oxford University ===
The constituency for Oxford University returned two Members of Parliament using the single transferable vote electoral system. The electorate consisted of graduates of the university. Gilbert Murray, who usually stood as a Liberal candidate in this election, instead stood as an independent in 1924.

General Election 1924: Oxford University (2 seats)
Party	Candidate	FPv%	Count	
Party	Candidate	FPv%	1	2
Unionist	Lord Hugh Cecil	49.65	4,320	
Unionist	Charles Oman	19.97	1,738	2,968
Independent	Gilbert Murray	30.38	2,643	2,832
Electorate: 10,773 Valid: 8,701 Quota: 2,901 Turnout: 80.77%

== See also ==
- 1924 United Kingdom general election in Scotland
- 1924 United Kingdom general election in Wales
- 1924 United Kingdom general election in Northern Ireland
