= 1924 United Kingdom general election in Northern Ireland =

- 29 October 1924

13 seats in Northern Ireland of 615 seats in the House of Commons
- Turnout: 66.7% (▼9.8 pp)

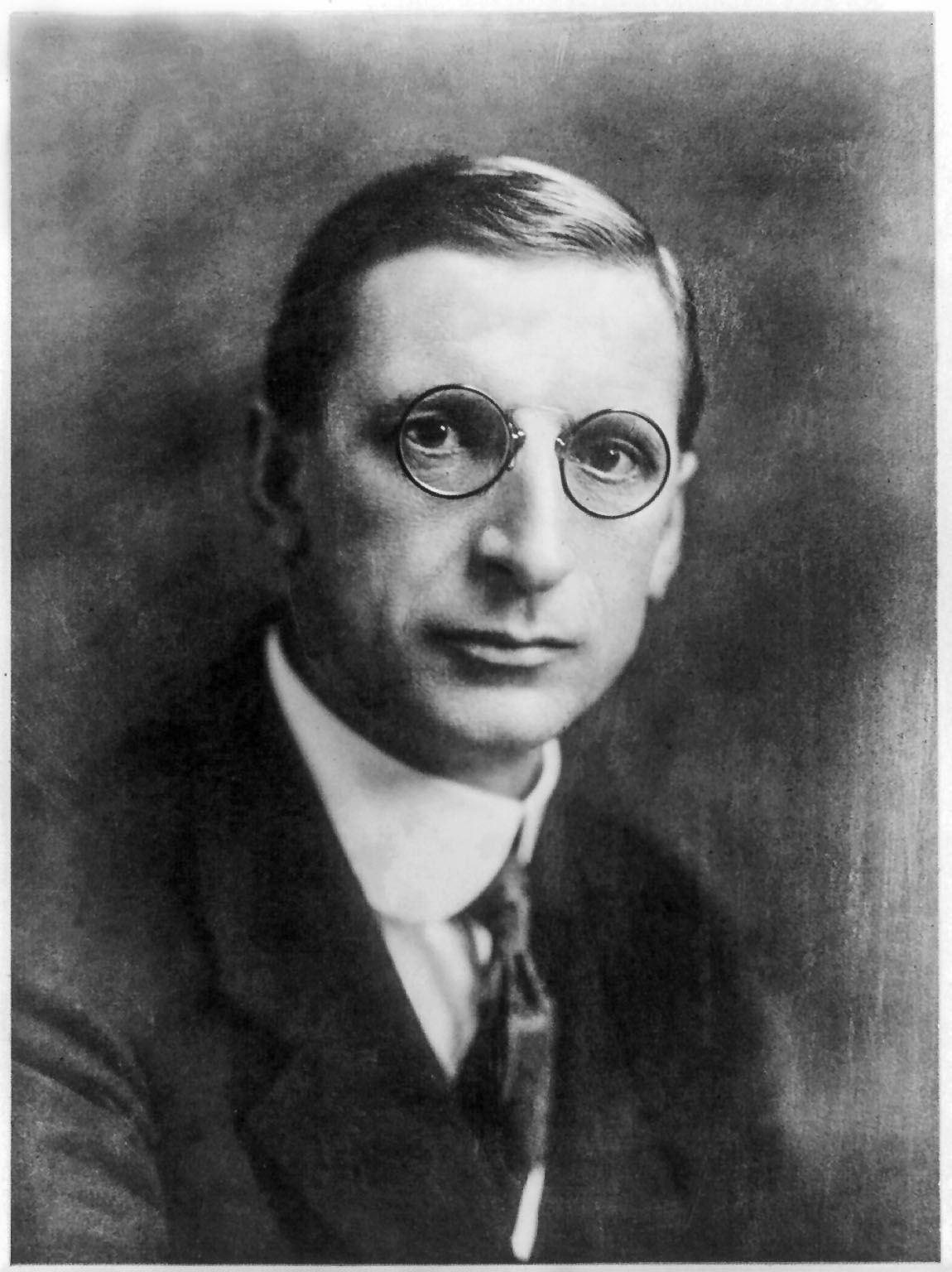
	First party	Second party
Leader	James Craig	Éamon de Valera
Party	UUP	Sinn Féin
Alliance	Conservative
Leader since	7 June 1921	October 1917
Leader's seat	Did not stand	Did not stand
Last election	11 seats, 49.4%	Did not contest
Seats won	13 (Note: Includes 3 members elected unopposed.)	0
Seat change	▲2	Steady
Popular vote	451,278 (Note: Voting took place in 10 of 13 seats. The other 3 MPs were unopposed.)	46,457
Percentage	83.8%	9.9%
Swing	▲34.4%	New party

On 29 October 1924, the 1924 United Kingdom general election was held in Northern Ireland to elect all 615 members of the House of Commons, with 13 seats being in Northern Ireland. There were ten constituencies, seven single-seat constituencies with elected by first-past-the-post voting and three two-seat constituencies with MPs elected by bloc voting.

It was the third general election to be held in less than two years. Parliament was dissolved on 9 October. Following the decision to withdraw the prosecution of Communist John Ross Campbell under the Incitement to Mutiny Act 1797 by Prime Minister Ramsay MacDonald on 13 August 1924, a motion was passed against the government on 8 October 1924. Despite not being framed as such, this was regarded by the Government as a loss of a motion of no confidence and caused the dissolution of Parliament on 9 October 1924 with new elections being called.

It was the first in which party leaders would give political broadcasts over radio during an general election campaign.

== Candidates ==
Below is a table summarising the candidates of the 1924 general election in Northern Ireland in the county and borough constituencies, and those in Queen's University of Belfast.

Affiliation	Candidates
Ulster Unionist Party	13
Sinn Féin	8
Northern Ireland Labour Party	1 (Note: Candidate Harry Midgley stood in Belfast West.)
Independent Unionist	1 (Note: Candidate William Galt stood in Londonderry.)
Total	23

== Results ==
The Nationalist Party did not contest this election. The nationalist interest was represented in the election by Sinn Féin, but they failed to win any seats, and the two seats which had been held by the Nationalist Party were won by the Ulster Unionists, so that all MPs in the region were from the same party. Three Ulster Unionists were elected unopposed.

In the election as a whole, the Conservative Party, which included the Ulster Unionists, returned to government with 412 of the 615 seats, and Stanley Baldwin was re-appointed as Prime Minister.

Party	Leader	Candidates	Seats					Aggregate votes		
Party	Leader	Candidates	Total	Gains	Losses	Net	Of total (%)	Total	Of total (%) (Note: Adjusted for multi-member constituencies.)	Change (%)
UUP	James; Craig	13	13	2	0	▲2	100.0	451,278	83.8	▼34.4
Sinn Féin	Éamon de Valera	8	0	Did not stand in 1923			—	46,457	9.9	—N/a
NI Labour	Sam; Kyle	1	0	New			—	21,122	6.1	New
Independent Unionist	—N/a	1	0	0	0	Steady	—	517	0.2	▼9.3
Other non-contested		0	0	—N/a		▼2 (Note: 2 Nationalist Party MPs.)	—	0	0.0	—N/a
Total		23	13			0	100.0	519,374	100.0	0.0
Registered voters, and turnout								522,320 (Note: Electorate in contested constituencies. The total electorate was 610,064.)	66.7	▼9.8

Popular vote
UUP	83.8%
Sinn Féin	9.9%
NI Labour	6.1%
Ind. Unionist	0.2%

Parliamentary seats
UUP	100.0%

== MPs elected ==
Constituency	Party	MP
Antrim	Ulster Unionist	Charles Craig
Antrim	Ulster Unionist	Hugh O'Neill
Armagh	Ulster Unionist	William Allen
Belfast East	Ulster Unionist	Herbert Dixon
Belfast North	Ulster Unionist	Thomas McConnell
Belfast South	Ulster Unionist	Thomas Moles
Belfast West	Ulster Unionist	Robert Lynn
Down	Ulster Unionist	David Reid
Down	Ulster Unionist	John Simms
Fermanagh and Tyrone	Ulster Unionist	Charles Falls
Fermanagh and Tyrone	Ulster Unionist	James Pringle
Londonderry	Ulster Unionist	Malcolm Macnaghten
Queen's University of Belfast	Ulster Unionist	Thomas Sinclair

=== By-election ===
By-election	Date	Incumbent	Party	Winner	Party	Cause
Londonderry	29 January 1929	Malcolm Macnaghten	UUP	Ronald Ross	UUP	Appointment to High Court of Northern Ireland

== See also ==
- 1924 United Kingdom general election in England
- 1924 United Kingdom general election in Scotland
- 1924 United Kingdom general election in Wales
