= 1924 United Kingdom general election in Wales =

- 29 October 1924

All 36 Welsh seats to the House of Commons
- Turnout: 80.0% (▲2.7 pp)
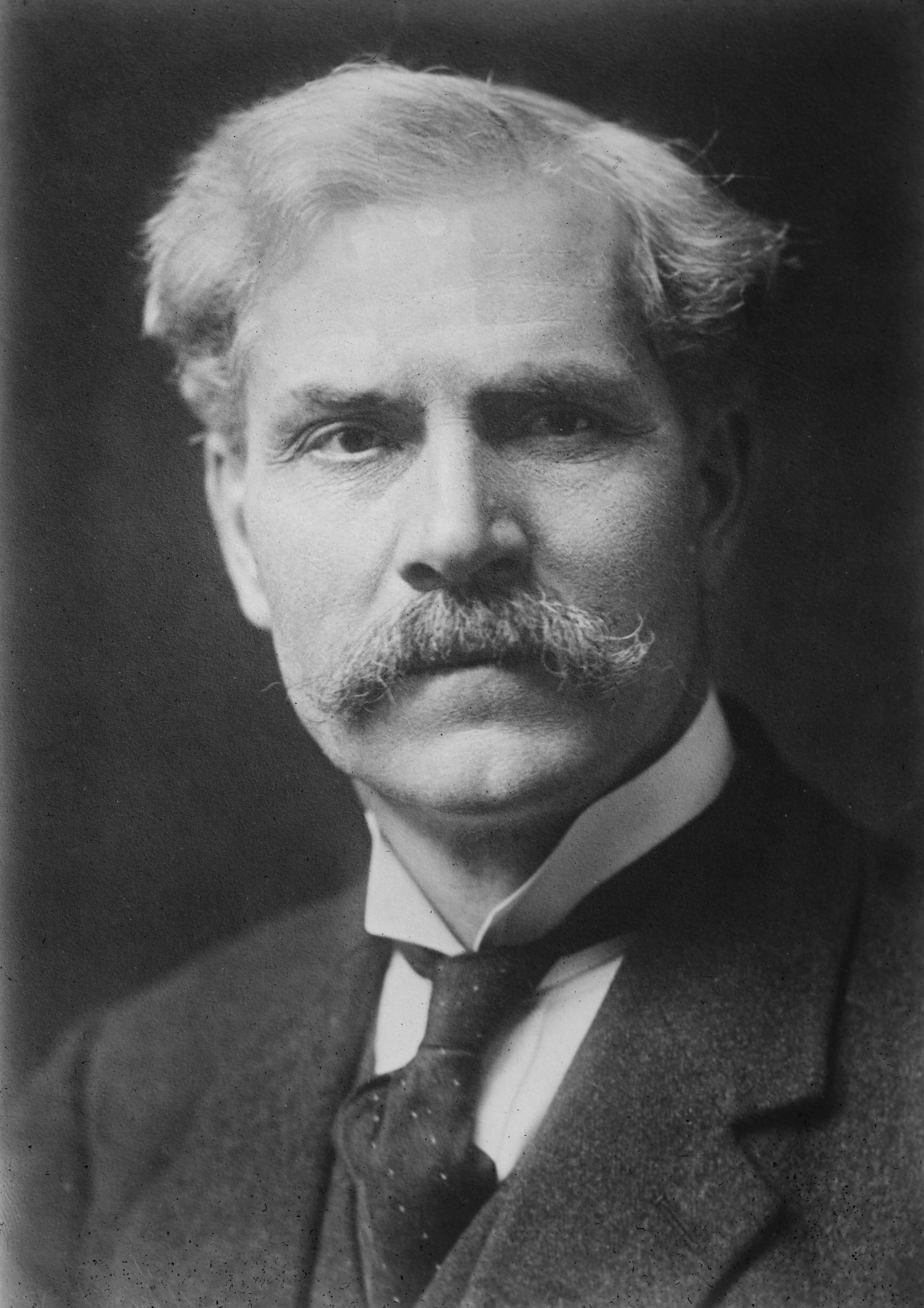

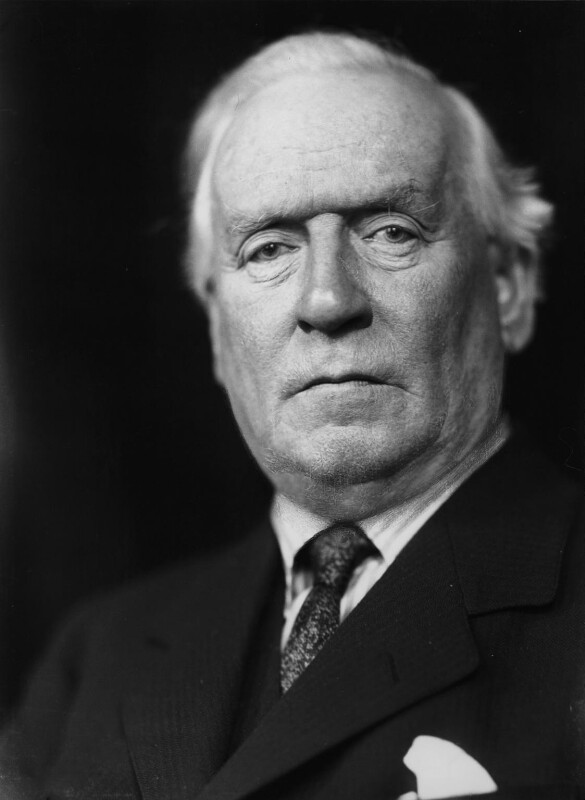

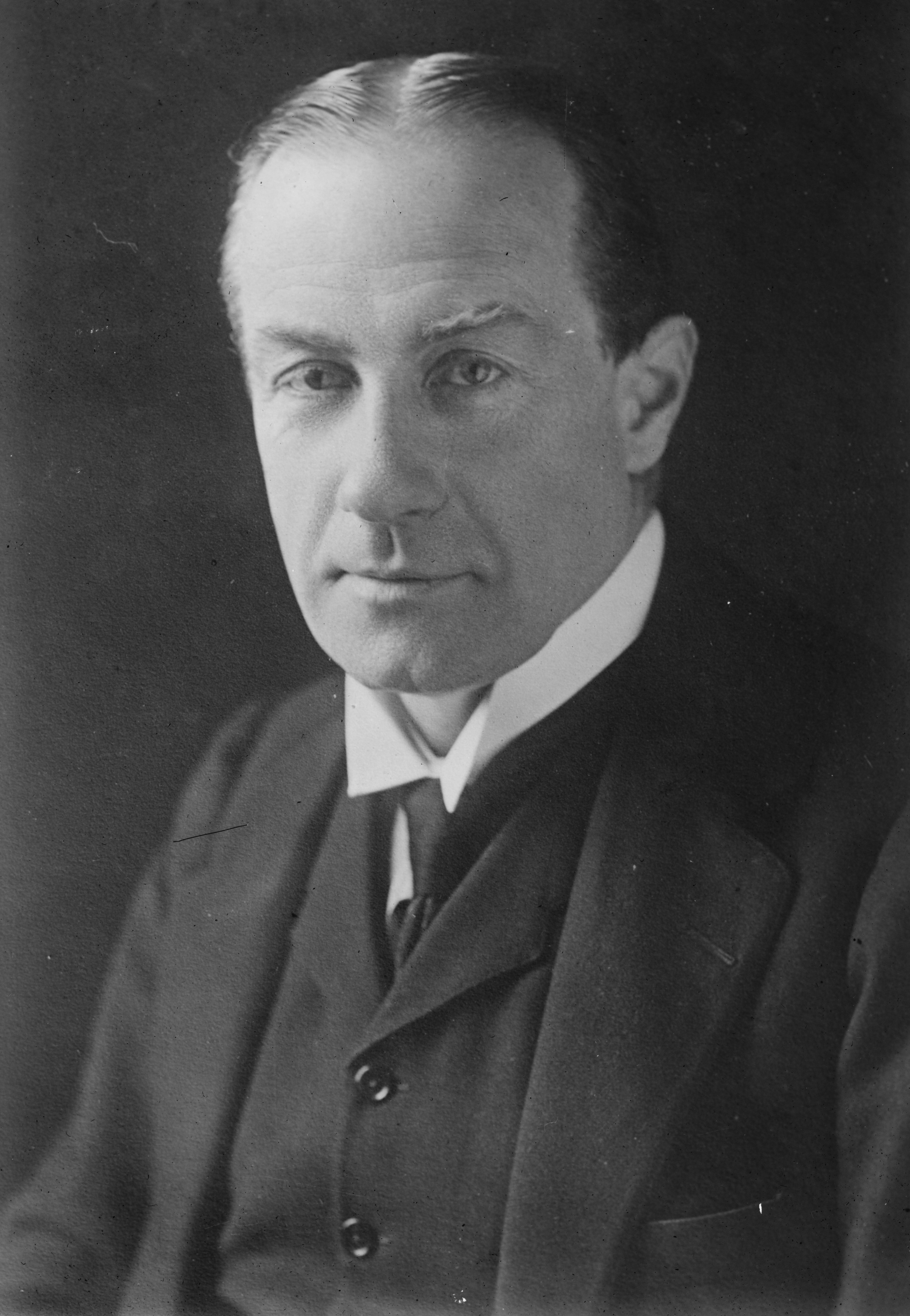
	First party	Second party	Third party
Leader	Ramsay MacDonald	H. H. Asquith	Stanley Baldwin
Party	Labour	Liberal	Conservative
Leader since	22 November 1922	30 April 1908	23 May 1923
Leader's seat	Aberavon	Paisley (lost seat)	Bewdley
Last election	19 seats, (Note: Combined results for county, borough and university seats.) 42.0%	11 seats, 35.4%	4 seats, 21.1%
Seats won	16	11	9
Seat change	▼3	Steady	▲5
Popular vote	320.397 (Note: Total and percentage votes given here are for territorial constituencies only.)	244,828	224,014
Percentage	40.6%	31.0%	28.4%
Swing	▼1.4 pp	▼4.4 pp	▲7.3 pp

On Wednesday 29 October 1924, the 1924 United Kingdom general election was held in Wales, to elect all 615 members of the House of Commons, with 36 constituencies being in Wales. 35 seats represented territorial constituencies contested under the first past the post electoral system, and one additional seat represented the University of Wales which was also contested under the first past the post electoral system.

It was the third general election to be held in less than two years. Parliament was dissolved on 9 October. Following the decision to withdraw the prosecution of Communist John Ross Campbell under the Incitement to Mutiny Act 1797 by Prime Minister Ramsay MacDonald on 13 August 1924, a motion was passed against the government on 8 October 1924. Despite not being framed as such, this was regarded by the Government as a loss of a motion of no confidence and caused the dissolution of Parliament on 9 October 1924 with new elections being called.

It was the first in which party leaders would give political broadcasts over radio during an general election campaign.

Although the election saw an increase of support for Labour by vote share in England, Labour's election loss across the United Kingdom to the Conservative Party, along with a collapse in Liberal support in England and Scotland, brought an end to the first Labour Government.

== Candidates ==
Below is a table summarising the candidates of the 1924 general election in Wales, excluding those in the University of Wales constituency.

Affiliation	Candidates
Labour Party	33
Liberal Party	21
Conservative and Unionist Party	17
Total	71

== Analysis ==
Overall, the Conservative Party won the election across the country, as well as seeing the largest increase in vote in Wales. As a result of the election in Wales, much like in the rest of the United Kingdom in this election, the Conservatives had gained the majority of its seats from the Liberal Party. In Wales, the party gained Flintshire, Pembrokeshire, Brecon and Radnorshire and Cardiff East from the Liberal Party. The party also gained Cardiff South from the Labour Party. However, the Labour Party retained its position as the largest party in Wales in number of seats and vote share, though losing its position as holding the majority of seats in Wales.

The Liberal party, however, gained Wrexham and Swansea West from Labour. The Liberal Member of Parliament Rhys Hopkin Morris, who had previously won Cardiganshire as an Independent Liberal in the 1923 United Kingdom general election, joined the Liberal Party benches in 1924. He was re-elected unopposed in the seat, thus representing a gain for the Liberal Party in the constituency. As such, the party lost only one total county and borough seat in Wales. These were the three of the only nine gained seats for the Liberal Party at this election, with only two coming from another party other than the rejoining member Morris. The six other seat gains for the Liberals were in England.

In addition, however, the party had also regained its seat in the University of Wales constituency. Former Liberal Member of Parliament for the seat of Cardiganshire, Ernest Evans, who had been defeated by Morris in the previous election, won the seat from the incumbent Christian Pacifist member George Davies. Davies had only held the seat for just over 10 months. Evans would hold the seat until 1942, when he was appointed as a County Court judge. With the addition of this seat, the Liberal Party retained an overall 11 seats in Wales.

== County and borough constituency results ==
Below is a table summarising the constituency results of the 1924 general election in Wales, excluding the result in the University of Wales constituency.

Party	Seats					Aggregate votes		
Party	Total	Gains	Losses	Net	Of total (%)	Total	Of total (%)	Change (%)
Labour	16	0	3	▼3	45.7	320,397	40.6	▼1.4
Liberal	10	3	4	▼1	28.6	244,828	31.0	▼4.4
Conservative	9	5	0	▲5	25.7	224,014	28.4	▲7.3
Other non-contested	0	0	1 (Note: Rhys Hopkin Morris won the seat of Cardiganshire as an Independent Liberal in 1923, however he rejoined Liberal Party in 1924. He was re-elected unopposed as a member of the party.)	▼1	—	—N/a	0.0	▼1.5
Total	35			0	100.0	789,239	100.0	0.0
Registered voters, and turnout						986,188 (Note: Electorate in contested constituencies. The total electorate was 1,287,543.)	80.0	▲2.7

Popular vote
Labour	40.6%
Liberal	31.0%
Conservative	28.4%

Parliament seats
Labour	45.7%
Liberal	28.6%
Conservative	25.7%

== University of Wales result ==
Below is a table summarising the 1924 constituency results for seat of the University of Wales constituency. The Liberal Party won the seat from the incumbent Christian Pacifist member George Davies, bringing the total seats of the Liberal Party to 11 out of the possible 36.

General election 1924: University of Wales
Party	Candidate	Votes	%	±%
Liberal	Ernest Evans	1,057	59.4	+24.3
Labour	George Davies	721	40.6	+4.9
Majority		336	18.6	N/A
Turnout		1,778		
Liberal gain from Christian Pacifist		Swing		

== See also ==
- 1924 United Kingdom general election in England
- 1924 United Kingdom general election in Scotland
- 1924 United Kingdom general election in Northern Ireland
- List of MPs for constituencies in Wales (1924–1929)
