= 1919 Chester-le-Street by-election =

- 13 November 1919
- Turnout: 63.7%
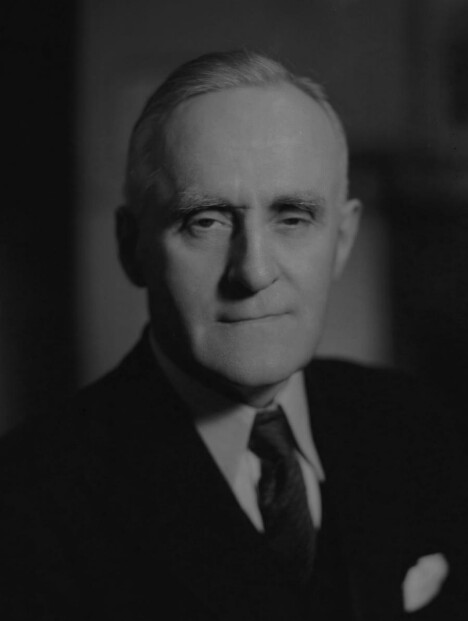

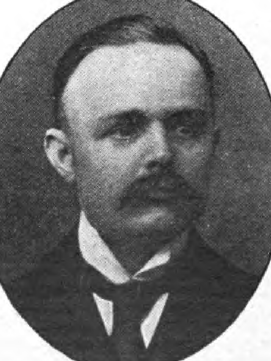
Candidate	Jack Lawson	David Gilmour
Party	Labour	National Democratic
Alliance		Coalition
Popular vote	17,838	5,313
Percentage	77.1%	22.9%
Swing	▼22.9%	New
MP before election
John Taylor
Labour
Subsequent MP
Jack Lawson
Labour

The 1919 Chester-le-Street by-election was held on 13 November 1919. The by-election was held due to the resignation of the incumbent Labour Member of Parliament (MP), John Wilkinson Taylor. It was won by the Labour candidate Jack Lawson.

== Result ==
Chester-le-Street by-election, 1919
Party		Candidate	Votes	%	±%
	Labour	Jack Lawson	17,838	77.1	N/A
C	National Democratic	David Gilmour	5,313	22.9	New
Majority			12,525	54.2	N/A
Turnout			23,151	63.7	N/A
Registered electors					
	Labour hold		Swing		
