= 1924 United Kingdom general election in Scotland =

- 29 October 1924

All 74 Scottish seats to the House of Commons
- Turnout: 75.1% (▲7.2 pp)
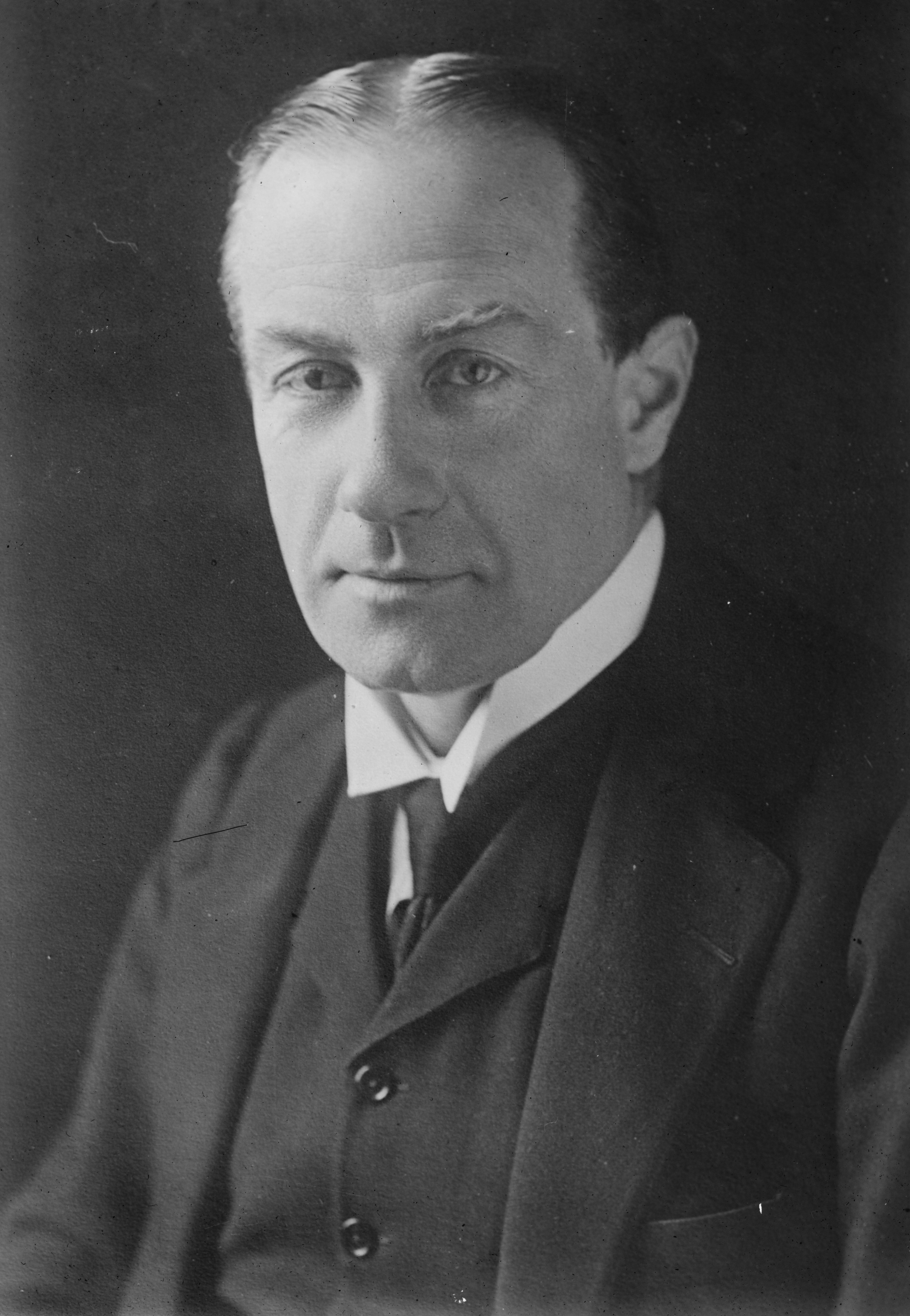

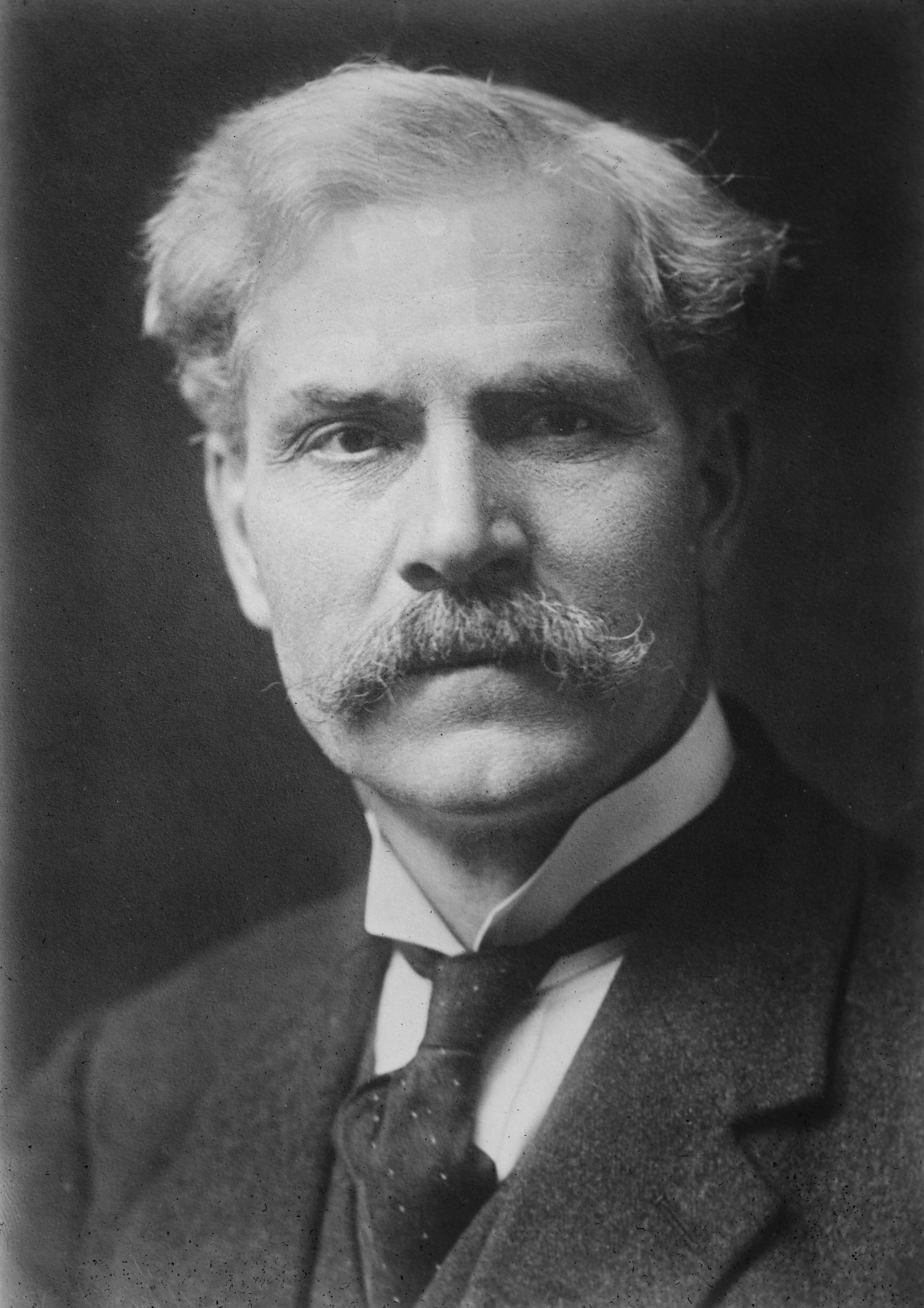

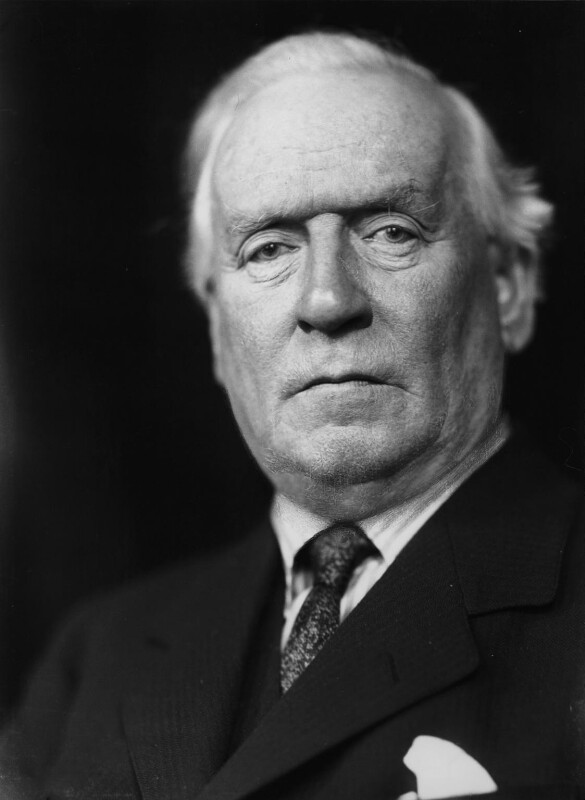
	First party	Second party	Third party
Leader	Stanley Baldwin	Ramsay MacDonald	H. H. Asquith
Party	Unionist	Labour	Liberal
Alliance	Conservative		Liberal
Leader's seat	Bewdley	Seaham	Paisley (lost seat)
Last election	16 seats, (Note: Combined results for burgh, county and university seats) 31.6%	34 seats, 35.9%	23 seats, 28.4%
Seats won	38	26	9
Seat change	▲22	▼8	▼14
Popular vote	688,299 (Note: Total and percentage votes given here are for territorial constituencies only)	697,146	286,540
Percentage	40.7%	41.1%	16.6%
Swing	▲8.5 pp	▲5.2 pp	▼11.8 pp

On Wednesday 29 October 1924, the 1924 United Kingdom general election was held in Scotland, to elect all 615 members of the House of Commons, with 74 seats being in Scotland. 71 seats (32 burgh constituencies and 38 county constituencies) (Note: One burgh seat, Dundee, was represented by two members of parliament.) represented territorial constituencies. There was also one university constituency, which elected an additional 3 members using the Single Transferable Vote (STV) method.

It was the third general election to be held in less than two years. Parliament was dissolved on 9 October. Following the decision to withdraw the prosecution of Communist John Ross Campbell under the Incitement to Mutiny Act 1797 by Prime Minister Ramsay MacDonald on 13 August 1924, a motion was passed against the government on 8 October 1924. Despite not being framed as such, this was regarded by the Government as a loss of a motion of no confidence and caused the dissolution of Parliament on 9 October 1924 with new elections being called.

It was the first in which party leaders would give political broadcasts over radio during an general election campaign.

Although the election saw an increase of support for Labour by vote share in England, Labour's election loss across the United Kingdom to the Conservative Party, along with a collapse in Liberal support in England and Scotland, brought an end to the first Labour Government.

== Candidates ==
Below is a table summarising the candidates of the 1924 general election in Scotland, excluding those in the Combined Scottish Universities constituency.

Affiliation	Candidates
Labour Party	61
Unionist Party	56
Scottish Liberal Party	34
Communist Party of Great Britain	2 (Note: The candidates that stood were Willie Gallacher in Dundee and Alec Geddes in Greenock.)
Co-operative Party	2 (Note: The candidates that stood were Andrew Young in Andrew Young and Tom Henderson in Glasgow Tradeston.)
Scottish Prohibition Party	1 (Note: Leader Edwin Scrymgeour stood in Dundee.)
Total	156

== Analysis ==
In Scotland the election saw both the Labour Party and the Unionists gain votes at the expense of the Liberals.

Labour lost 12 seats to the Unionists, however gained Motherwell from the Unionist Party and three seats from the Liberal Party. The Unionist Party gained 12 seats from the Labour Party, being Stirlingshire West, Renfrewshire East, Dunbartonshire, Lanark, Glasgow Partick, Lanarkshire North, Renfrewshire West, Glasgow Maryhill, Kilmarnock, Midlothian & Peebles North, Linlithgow and Berwick and Haddington. The Co-operative Party, under the Labour Party Whip, lost Glasgow Patrick, with the party retaining Glasgow Tradeston. Labour also gained a further 11 seats from the Liberal Party. Labour were slightly (0.4%) ahead of the Unionists in terms of votes cast, however the Unionists managed to secure 12 more Scottish seats than Labour overal, winning 38 seats in total.

The Scottish Liberals saw an 11.8% swing against them and lost more than half their seats to finish third. The Liberals lost Stirling and Falkirk, Paisley and Edinburgh East to Labour. It also lost Banff, East Aberdeenshire & Kincardineshire, Aberdeen and Kincardine Central, Forfarshire, Perth, Fife East, Argyll, Edinburgh West, Edinburgh North, Dumfriesshire and Galloway to the Unionist Party. In total, the Scottish Liberals lost 14 seats in Scotland at this election.

The only other party represented in parliament from Scotland was the Scottish Prohibition Party, who retained their only seat in Dundee.

When combined with results from across the UK, Stanley Baldwin's Conservatives, within a national affiliation with the Unionists at Westminster, obtained a large parliamentary majority of 209. Labour lost 40 seats. The Liberal Party, led by Asquith, lost 118 of their 158 seats which brought about a polarisation of British politics between two parties, the Labour Party and the Conservative Party.

== Seat summary ==
Below is a table summarising the total number of seats, gains and losses for each party in both the territorial county and burgh constituencies and the Combined Scottish Universities constituency.

Party	Seats				
Party	Total	Gains	Losses	Net	Of total (%)
Unionist	38	23	1	▲22	51.4
Labour (Total)	26	4	12	▼8	35.1
Labour	25	4	11	▼7	33.8
Co-operative Party	1	0	1	▼1	1.4
Liberal	9	0	14	▼14	12.2
Scottish Prohibition	1	0	0	Steady	1.4
Total	74				

== County and burgh constituency results ==
Below is a table summarising the constituency results of the 1924 general election in Scotland, excluding the result in the Combined Scottish Universities constituency.

Party	Seats					Aggregate votes		
Party	Total	Gains	Losses	Net	Of total (%)	Total	Of total (%) (Note: Adjusted for multi-member constituencies.)	Change (%)
Unionist	36	23	1	▲22	50.7	688,299	40.7	▲8.5
Labour (Total)	26	4	12	▼8	36.6	697,146	41.1	▲5.2
Labour	25	4	11	▼7	35.2	673,467	39.7	▲5.7
Co-operative Party	1	0	1	▼1	1.4	23,679	1.4	▼0.5
Liberal	8	0	14	▼14	11.3	286,540	16.6	▼11.8
Scottish Prohibition	1	0	0	Steady	1.4	29,193	0.9	Steady
Communist	0	0	0	Steady	—	15,930	0.7	▼1.7
Total	71			0	100.0	1,717,108	100.0	0.0
Registered voters, and turnout						2,207,635 (Note: Electorate in contested constituencies. The total electorate was 2,279,893.)	75.1	▲7.2

Popular vote
Labour	41.1%
Unionist	40.7%
Liberal	16.6%
Prohibition	0.9%
Communist	0.7%

Parliamentary seats
Unionist	51.4%
Labour	35.1%
Liberal	12.2%
Prohibition	1.4%

== Combined Scottish Universities result ==
The Combined Scottish Universities elected an additional 3 members to the house using the STV voting method. The constituency had not been contested at the previous election in 1923.

General election 1924: Combined Scottish Universities
Party	Candidate	Votes	%	±%
Unionist	Henry Craik	7,188	40.8	N/A
Liberal	Dugald Cowan	5,011	28.4	N/A
Unionist	George Andreas Berry	3,781	21.5	N/A
Labour	John Martin Munro	1,639	9.3	New
Majority		2,142	12.2	N/A
Turnout		17,619		
Unionist hold		Swing		
Liberal hold		Swing		
Unionist hold		Swing		

== See also ==
- 1924 United Kingdom general election in England
- 1924 United Kingdom general election in Wales
- 1924 United Kingdom general election in Northern Ireland
