= Durham Colliery Mechanics' Association =

English trade union

The Durham Colliery Mechanics' Association was a trade union representing mechanics working at coal mines in County Durham, in England.

A predecessor of the union was founded in 1874 as the National Amalgamated Society of Colliery Mechanics, but it quickly lost members and by the end of 1878 was nearly defunct. At the start of 1879, a new union was formed, covering only the Durham coalfield. The Durham Miners' Association saw it as a sectional, breakaway, group, and in its early years it was a conservative organisation, seeking to maintain the privileges of the mechanics as opposed to other colliery workers.

By 1892, the union had 2,477 members, and this grew further, to 4,908 in 1911. That year, it was a founding member of the National Federation of Colliery Mechanics' Associations, with other similar organisations in Northumberland and Scotland – in other areas of the country, mechanics remained part of the main miners' unions. It also worked with the Durham Miners' Association, Durham County Colliery Enginemen's Association and the Durham Cokemen's Association in the Durham County Mining Federation Board.

From 1897 to 1923, the union was led by John Wilkinson Taylor. It sponsored him as a Labour Party candidate, and he sat as a Member of Parliament from 1906 until 1919. Under his leadership, the union continued its growth, membership peaking at 9,509 in 1925.

In 1944, the union became part of Group Number 1 of the National Union of Mineworkers, along with the Northumberland Colliery Mechanics and the Yorkshire Winders and Enginemen. During the UK miners' strike of 1984–1985, it was led by Bill Etherington. Some members split away, forming an anti-strike Colliery Mechanics' Association which hoped to establish itself on a national basis, but the majority of members remained with the union.

== General secretaries ==
1874: F. Storar
1879: George Dover
1881: Launcelot Trotter
1897: John Wilkinson Taylor
1923: W. S. Hall
1983: Bill Etherington
