= National Federation of Colliery Mechanics' Associations =

Trade unions in Great Britain, 1911 to 1945

The National Federation of Colliery Mechanics' Associations (NFCMA) was a federation bringing together unions representing mechanics at coal mines in Great Britain.

The federation was established in 1911, on the initiative of the Durham Colliery Mechanics' Association, with the Northumberland Colliery Mechanics' Association, the North Wales Surfacemen's Union, and a Scottish union also affiliating. The federation was based in Durham, while its treasurer was John Batey from Northumberland. In 1925, John Gillians became treasurer, and in 1933 also became secretary of the federation.

Most of the federation's affiliates also held membership of the Miners' Federation of Great Britain. In 1945, this union reformed itself as the more centralised National Union of Mineworkers, and it appears that the NFCMA then dissolved.
