= John Hutton =

John Hutton may refer to:

== Politicians ==
- John Hutton (died 1596), MP for Cambridgeshire
- John Hutton (1659–1731), British Member of Parliament for Richmond, 1701–1702
- John Hutton (physician) (died 1712), Scottish physician and Member of Parliament
- John E. Hutton (1828–1893), U.S. Representative from Missouri
- Sir John Hutton (publisher) (1841–1903), publisher and chairman of the London County Council
- John Hutton (Conservative politician) (1847–1921), British Conservative Member of Parliament for Richmond, 1895–1906
- John Hutton, Baron Hutton of Furness (born 1955), former British Labour Member of Parliament for Barrow and Furness and Secretary of State for Defence

== Sportsmen ==
- Bouse Hutton (John Bower Hutton, 1877–1962), Canadian football fullback, and ice hockey and lacrosse goaltender
- Jock Hutton (John Douglas Hutton, 1898–1970), Scottish footballer who played for Aberdeen, Blackburn Rovers and Scotland
- John Hutton (cricketer) (born 1946), English cricketer
- John Hutton (footballer) (born 1966), Australian rules footballer with the Brisbane Bears and Fremantle Dockers

== Others ==
- John Hutton (artist) (1906–1978), famous for glass engravings at Coventry Cathedral
- John Hutton (author) (1928–2022), British writer of crime and thriller novels
- John Hutton (designer) (1947–2006), American designer
- John Henry Hutton (1885–1968), professor of social anthropology at the University of Cambridge, 1937–1950
- John Hutton (priest) (died 1712), English priest
