= 1924 United Kingdom general election =

- 29 October 1924

All 615 seats in the House of Commons 308 seats needed for a majority
- Registered: 21,730,988
- Turnout: 16,640,279; 77.0% (▲5.9 pp)

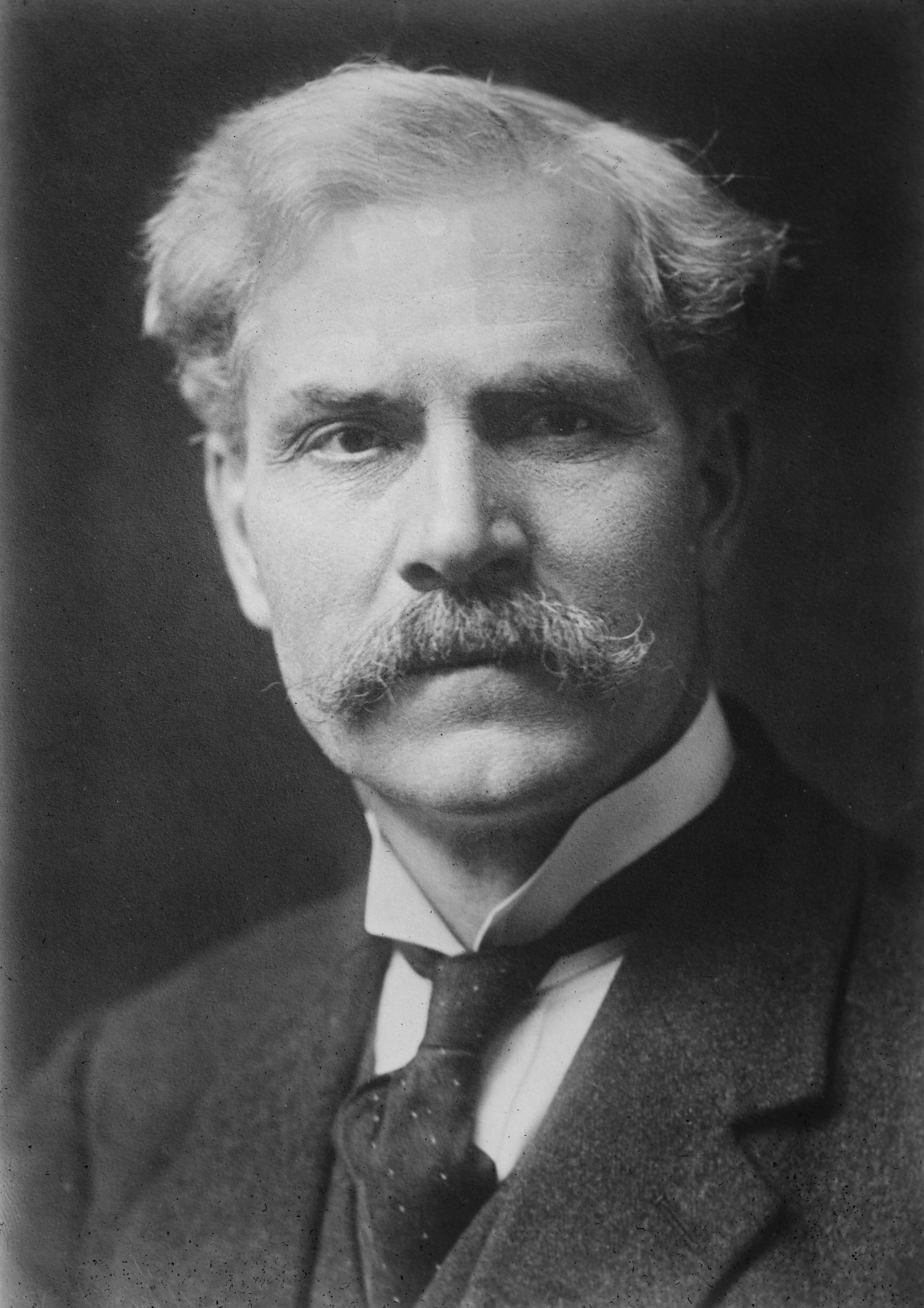

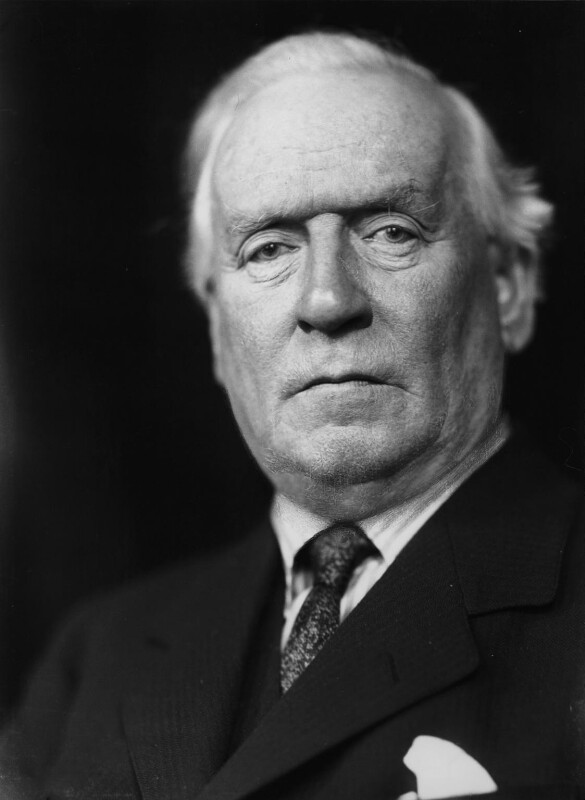
	First party	Second party	Third party
Leader	Stanley Baldwin	Ramsay MacDonald	H. H. Asquith
Party	Conservative	Labour	Liberal
Leader since	23 May 1923	21 November 1922	30 April 1908
Leader's seat	Bewdley	Aberavon	Paisley (lost seat)
Last election	258 seats, 38.0%	191 seats, 30.7%	158 seats, 29.7%
Seats won	412	151	40 (Note: Figure includes Speaker of the House of Commons John Henry Whitley in Halifax.)
Seat change	▲154	▼40	▼118
Popular vote	7,854,523	5,489,087	2,928,737
Percentage	46.8%	33.3%	17.8%
Swing	▲8.8 pp	▲2.6 pp	▼11.9 pp
- Colours denote the winning party—as shown in § Results (Note: Northern Ireland and university constituencies not shown.)

- Diagram showing the composition of the House of Commons following the election
Prime Minister before election
Ramsay MacDonald
Labour
Prime Minister after election
Stanley Baldwin
Conservative

A general election was held in the United Kingdom on Wednesday 29 October 1924, as a result of the defeat of the Labour minority government, led by Prime Minister Ramsay MacDonald, in the House of Commons on a motion of no confidence. It was the third general election to be held in less than two years. Parliament was dissolved on 9 October.

The Conservatives, led by Stanley Baldwin, performed better, in electoral terms, than in the 1923 general election and obtained a large parliamentary majority of 209. Labour, led by MacDonald, lost 40 seats. The election also saw the Liberal Party, led by H. H. Asquith, lose 118 of their 158 seats, which helped polarise British politics between the Labour and Conservative parties.

The Conservative landslide victory and the Labour defeat in this general election have been, in part, attributed to the Zinoviev letter, a forged document that was published as if it were genuine and sensationalised in the Daily Mail four days before the election. The Labour vote increased by around one million in comparison to the 1923 general election, but this was largely due to the party putting up 87 more candidates than it had in the previous election.

The Conservatives had called the previous 1923 election early to get a mandate for moving to a protectionist trade policy of imperial preference, but had lost their majority. In 1924, they reverted to free trade and regained power. They would propose protectionism at the next general election in 1929, again losing.

Along with 1964 and 1992, this was the first of three elections in the 20th century to take place in the same year as a United States presidential election. This is also the closest instance in which both elections overlapped with the latter's election taking place a week later.

== Overview ==
After the previous general election, the Labour Party had finished as the second-largest party, but formed their first-ever government with the support of the Liberal Party, after the ruling Conservative Party's shock loss of their majority made it untenable for Baldwin to continue as Prime Minister. However, relations between Labour and the Liberals proved stormy, eventually resulting in Liberal M.P. Sir John Simon calling a motion of no confidence in MacDonald's government, which was carried by a large majority. Asquith had gambled that neither Baldwin nor MacDonald would want to put the country through a third general election in two years, and that one of them would be forced to enter into a formal coalition with the Liberals. However, the gambit backfired when MacDonald instead called an election, knowing full well that a Conservative landslide was the only likely outcome, but himself gambling that it would be primarily at the expense of the Liberals. MacDonald's judgement proved correct, as the Liberals, who were still mostly dependent on former Prime Minister David Lloyd George for funds, ended up financially crippled from the very start of the campaign, while Labour were actually able to expand the scope of their own campaign thanks to increasing support from the workers' unions.

It is speculated that the combination of Labour forming its first government in January 1924 and the Zinoviev letter helped to stir up anti-socialist fears in Britain among many traditional anti-socialist Liberal voters, who then switched their support to the Conservative Party. This partly helps to explain the poor performance of the Liberal Party in the general election. The party also had financial difficulties which allowed it to contest only 339 seats, a lack of distinctive policies after the Conservative Party dropped their support for protected trade, and poor leadership under Asquith, who lost his own seat for the second time in six years. It would be the final election for Asquith, who was subsequently forced to lead the party from the House of Lords after being elevated to the Earldom of Oxford and Asquith the following year, with Lloyd George as Liberal chairman in the House of Commons. Declining health saw Asquith replaced as party leader by Lloyd George in 1926.

The fourth party in terms of number of candidates, number of seats and number of votes were not a party but a group of former National Liberals standing under the Constitutionalist label, led by Winston Churchill. They favoured Conservative/Liberal co-operation and had intended to formally organize as a party, but the election was called before they had the opportunity to actually do so. Three of the seven Constitutionalists elected, including Churchill, had been opposed by official Liberal candidates, and sat as Conservatives after the election. The other four sat as Liberals.

The refounded Sinn Féin ran Westminster candidates for the first time since March 1919; none came close to winning, with six of the eight losing their deposits. Its next Westminster election was in 1950.

The election was the first in the United Kingdom to feature party political broadcasts, with the parties making short appeals to voters via BBC Radio.

== Results ==
=== Summary of seats returned ===
Party	Leader	MPs		Aggregate votes	
Party	Leader		Of total		Of total (Note: Adjusted for multi-member constituencies.)
Conservative and Unionist Party	Stanley Baldwin	412	67.0%	7,854,523	46.8%
Conservative Party (Note: Results for England and Wales.)	Stanley Baldwin	361	58.7%	6,703,977	40.9%
Unionist Party	Victor Hope	38	6.2%	699,268	4.2%
Ulster Unionist Party	James Craig	13	2.1%	451,278	1.7%
Labour Party	Ramsay MacDonald	151	24.6%	5,489,087	33.3%
Labour Party	Ramsay MacDonald	146	23.7%	5,360,250	32.5%
Co-operative Party	—N/a	5	0.8%	128,837	0.8%
Liberal Party	H. H. Asquith	40	6.5%	2,928,737	17.8%
Constitutionalist	—N/a	7	1.1%	185,075	1.2%
Independent	—N/a	2	0.3%	25,206	0.2%
Communist	Albert Inkpin	1	0.2%	55,346	0.3%
Scottish Prohibition Party	Edwin Scrymgeour	1	0.2%	29,193	0.1%
Irish Nationalist	T. P. O'Connor	1	0.2%	0	0.0%

=== Full Results ===

Results of the October 1924 general election to the House of Commons of the United Kingdom
Party	Leader	Candidates	MPs					Aggregate votes		
Party	Leader	Candidates	Total	Gains	Losses	Net	Of total (%)	Total	Of total (%) (Note: Adjusted for multi-member constituencies.)	Change (%)
Conservative (Note: Figure includes the Unionist Party and the Ulster Unionist Party under their nation affiliations with the Conservative Party.)	Stanley Baldwin	534	412	163	9	▲154	67.0	7,854,523	46.8	▲8.8
Labour (Total)	Ramsay; MacDonald	514	151	23	63	▼40	24.6	5,489,087	33.3	▲2.6
Labour	Ramsay; MacDonald	504	138	22	61	▼39	22.4	5,360,250	32.5	▲2.6
Co-operative Party	—N/a	10	5	1	2	▼1	0.7	128,837	0.8	Steady
Liberal	H. H. Asquith	339	40	10	128	▼118	6.5	2,928,737	17.8	▼11.9
Constitutionalist	—N/a	12	7	7	0	▲7	1.1	185,075	1.2	▲1.1
Communist	Albert; Inkpin	8	1	1 (Note: Shapurji Saklatvala in Battersea North.)	0	▲1	0.2	55,346	0.3	▲0.1
Sinn Féin	Éamon de Valera	8	0	Did not stand in 1923			—	46,457	0.2	—N/a
Independent	—N/a	7	2 (Note: Ernest Graham-Little in London University and Austin Hopkinson in Mossley.)	1 (Note: Ernest Graham-Little in London University.)	1 (Note: Oswald Mosley in Harrow, though he unsuccessfully stood as a Labour candidate in Birmingham Ladywood.)	Steady	0.3	25,206	0.2	▼0.1
Scottish Prohibition	Edwin; Scrymgeour	1	1 (Note: Edwin Scrymgeour in Dundee.)	0	0	Steady	0.2	25,206	0.1	Steady
NI Labour	Sam; Kyle	1 (Note: Candidate Harry Midgley stood in Belfast West.)	0	New			—	21,122	0.1	New
Independent; Liberal	—N/a	1 (Note: Candidate J. R. M. Butler stood in Cambridge University.)	0	0	1 (Note: Rhys Hopkin Morris in Ceredigion relected in seat, but as official Liberal Party candidates.)	▼1	—	3,241	0.0	▼0.1
Democratic; Labour	—N/a	1 (Note: Candidate Mary Richardson stood in Acton.)	0	New			—	1,775	0.0	New
Independent; Unionist	—N/a	1 (Note: Candidate William Galt stood in Londonderry.)	0	0	0	Steady	—	517	0.0	▼0.1
Irish; Nationalist	T. P. O'Connor	1	1 (Note: T. P. O'Connor in Liverpool Scotland.)	0	0	Steady	0.2	0	0.0	▼0.1
Other non-contested		0	0	—N/a		▼2 (Note: 2 Nationalist Party MPs.)	—	0	0.0	—N/a
Blank and invalid votes								31,604	—	—
Total		1,428	615			0	100.0	16,640,279 (Note: All valid votes excluding spoiled votes.)	100.0	0.0
Registered voters, and turnout								21,730,988 (Note: Including the electorate in uncontested constituencies.)	77.0 (Note: Adjusted for multi-member constituencies.)	▲5.9

=== Votes summary ===
Popular vote
Conservative	46.79%
Labour	30.68%
Liberal	17.78%
Others	4.75%

=== Seats summary ===
Parliamentary seats
Conservative	66.99%
Labour	24.55%
Liberal	6.50%
Others	1.96%

== Transfers of seats ==
- All comparisons are with the 1923 election.
  - In some cases the change is due to the MP defecting to the gaining party. Such circumstances are marked with a *.
  - In other circumstances the change is due to the seat having been won by the gaining party in a by-election in the intervening years, and then retained in 1924. Such circumstances are marked with a †.

To	From	No.	Seats
Communist	Liberal	1	Battersea North
Labour	Liberal	16	Stirling and Falkirk, Paisley, Edinburgh East, Gateshead, Rochdale, Bermondsey West, Southwark Central, Newcastle upon Tyne East, Newcastle upon Tyne West, Burslem, Middlesbrough East, Elland, Keighley, Penistone, Bradford South, Dewsbury
Labour	Conservative	7	Motherwell, Barrow-in-Furness, Liverpool West Toxteth, Lincoln, Peckham, Wolverhampton Bilston, Birmingham King's Norton
Labour gains:		23	
Liberal	Labour	8	Walthamstow West, Bristol North, Hackney South, Norwich (one of two), Bradford East, Batley and Morley, Wrexham, Swansea West
Liberal	Independent Liberal	1	Cardiganshire *
Liberal gains:		9	
Conservative	Labour	55	Stirlingshire West, Renfrewshire East, Dunbartonshire, Lanark, Glasgow Partick, Lanarkshire North, Renfrewshire West, Glasgow Maryhill, Kilmarnock, Midlothian & Peebles North, Linlithgow, Berwick & Haddington, Reading, Birkenhead West, Crewe, Carlisle, Whitehaven, Derby (one of two), Barnard Castle, Leyton East, East Ham North, Essex SE, Maldon, Upton, Dartford, Gravesend, Bolton (one of two), Eccles, Oldham (one of two), Salford North, Salford South, Salford West, Warrington, Leicester East, Holland with Boston†, Greenwich, Kennington, Hammersmith North, St Pancras North, St Pancras South East, Norfolk South, Norwich (one of two), Kettering, Northampton, Enfield, Tottenham South, The Wrekin, Frome, Lichfield, Ipswich, Coventry, Wakefield, Bradford Central, Pontefract, Cardiff South
Conservative	Liberal	106	Bodmin, Cornwall North, Penryn and Falmouth, St Ives, Banff, East Aberdeenshire & Kincardineshire, Aberdeen and Kincardine Central, Forfarshire, Perth, Fife East, Argyll, Edinburgh West, Edinburgh North, Dumfriesshire, Galloway, Bedfordshire Mid, Luton, Abingdon, Newbury, Aylesbury, Wycombe, Huntingdonshire, Isle of Ely, Altrincham, Birkenhead East, Stalybridge and Hyde, Stockport (one of two), Wirral, Barnstaple, South Molton, Tavistock, Tiverton, Torquay, Totnes, Dorset North, Stockton-on-Tees, The Hartlepools, Chelmsford, Harwich, Stroud, Thornbury, Basingstoke, Portsmouth Central, Isle of Wight, Hemel Hempstead, Kingston upon Hull South West, Sevenoaks, Blackpool, Darwen, Lancaster, Lonsdale, Preston (one of two), Manchester Blackley, Manchester Exchange, Manchester Moss Side, Manchester Rusholme, Manchester Withington, Royton, Bootle, Liverpool Wavertree, Liverpool West Derby, Southport, Bosworth, Harborough, Leicester South, Gainsborough, Horncastle, Louth, Hackney North, Brixton, Islington East, Camberwell North-West, Hackney Central, Stoke Newington, Great Yarmouth, King's Lynn, Norfolk East, Hexham, Nottingham Central, Nottingham East, Finchley, Willesden East, Oxford†, Shrewsbury, Bath, Bridgwater, Taunton, Wells, Weston-super-Mare, Walsall, Sudbury, Chichester, Nuneaton, Rugby, Chippenham, Westbury, Devizes, Salisbury, Cleveland, Bradford North, Sowerby, Flintshire, Pembrokeshire, Brecon and Radnor, Cardiff East
Conservative	National Liberal	1	Loughborough
Conservative	Independent	1	Harrow^{1}
Conservative gains:		163	
Constitutionalist	Liberal	5	Accrington, Heywood and Radcliffe, Stretford, Stoke, Camborne
Constitutionalist	Conservative	2	Epping, Walthamstow East
UUP	Nationalist	2	Fermanagh and Tyrone (both seats)

^{1} Previous MP had defected to Labour by the time of the 1924 election

== See also ==
- List of MPs elected in the 1924 United Kingdom general election
- 1924 United Kingdom general election in England
- 1924 United Kingdom general election in Scotland
- 1924 United Kingdom general election in Wales
- 1924 United Kingdom general election in Northern Ireland
- 1924 in the United Kingdom
