= Jack Lawson =

British politician (1881–1965)

The Right Honourable The Lord Lawson PC
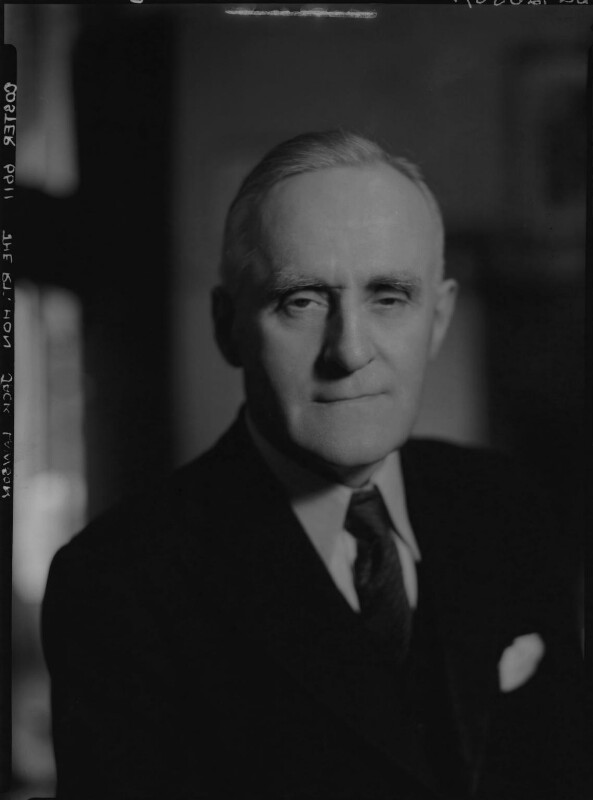

Secretary of State for War
- In office 3 August 1945 – 4 October 1946
- Monarch: George VI
- Prime Minister: Clement Attlee
- Preceded by: Sir P. J. Grigg
- Succeeded by: Frederick Bellenger

Financial Secretary to the War Office
- In office 23 January 1924 – 11 November 1924
- Prime Minister: Ramsay MacDonald
- Preceded by: Rupert Gwynne
- Succeeded by: Douglas King

Member of Parliament for Chester-le-Street
- In office 13 November 1919 – 19 December 1949
- Preceded by: John Wilkinson Taylor
- Succeeded by: Patrick Bartley

Personal details
- Born: John James Lawson; 16 October 1881 Whitehaven, Cumberland, England
- Died: 3 August 1965 (aged 83)
- Party: Labour
- Education: Ruskin College, Oxford

John James Lawson, 1st Baron Lawson, PC (16 October 1881 – 3 August 1965) was a British trade unionist and Labour Party politician. A miner and later the Member of Parliament (MP) for Chester-le-Street in County Durham (1919–1949), he served in the governments of Ramsay MacDonald and Clement Attlee. In 1950 he was ennobled as Baron Lawson, of Beamish in the County of Durham, and is sometimes referred to as Lord Lawson of Beamish.

== Background ==
Lawson was born in the port town of Whitehaven, Cumberland, and grew up in the nearby village of Kells. His father John Lawson was a sailor and miner who had begun working in a colliery by the age of nine, sailed round the world by eleven, and later served in the Royal Naval Reserve. His mother, Lisbeth Savage, was a strict disciplinarian. Both parents were illiterate and the family lived in extremes of poverty common at the time. At the age of three, Lawson was sent to the local National School, Glass House School. Here, he learned to read, developing an avid interest in popular fiction as a boy, and moving on to literary fiction and poetry in later years. When he was six his family moved to the village of Flimby, near the towns of Maryport and Workington. The family now included ten children: five boys and five girls. Two of his elder brothers worked with his father at the local colliery and the family was no longer on the breadline. A year later, they moved to County Durham, where the working members were employed at Boldon Colliery. The family joined the Co-operative Society, and were committed trade unionists, active in the Durham miners' strike of 1892. Outside of school, Jack Lawson's time was consumed with chores and he often looked after his youngest brother, Will, born in 1890.

Lawson eagerly began work in the colliery the day after he turned twelve. He started as a trapper, opening and shutting doors for the drivers, working a ten-hour day. He was paid ten pence per day, and his life greatly improved – he was treated as an adult now. After a few months he became a driver, with his own pony. After a couple more years, he began off-hand work, braking inclines and attending to the signalling bells. He began attending union meetings, including the annual Durham Miners' Gala, where in later years he met the likes of Will Crooks, Ellen Wilkinson, Ernest Bevin and George Lansbury. At eighteen he became a putter and began speaking and working for the union. With five members of the family now working at the colliery, the Lawsons had a higher status and moved into a house closer to the pit, with a front room. Throughout this period he gambled frequently and read a lot: eventually, reading won over gambling. He had read nothing of economics or politics yet, but had developed a strong sense of injustice, firmly believing that manual workers were under-paid and under-valued. These ideas generally seemed strange to his colleagues and family and he kept them to himself. He joined the Methodist Society, and found his ideas more accepted there. Through reading the Labour Leader and The Clarion, Lawson realised he was a socialist. At the age of 21 he met Isabella Graham Scott, a domestic servant from Sunderland who was staying with friends at Boldon. They were married in February 1906.

== Trade unionist ==
In 1904, Lawson joined the newly founded branch of the Independent Labour Party at Boldon. He was invited to be a speaker, but initially refused, unsure of his own ability. He discovered a socialist bookshop in Newcastle, where he met many like-minded people, and read books on economics and society, including those of Thomas Carlyle and John Ruskin. He became a hewer that year, working at the coal-face, and within a few months was elected as an assistant checkweighman. He had no ambition for work beyond being a hewer, but he did want to continue his education. He began teaching boys who worked at the colliery and then helped to set up a school for adults in two disused colliery houses.

In 1905 Lawson became an active speaker for the ILP, expounding socialism and the Labour Representation Committee to the miners of Durham, who had traditionally supported the Liberal Party. Later that year, Lawson joined a correspondence class with Ruskin College, Oxford. The following spring, Lawson received a letter from the college offering him six months' scholarship if he could find the money to pay for the other six months. This was a significant expense that would be compounded by living costs, and as Lawson was determined that he would only ever work as a miner there was no obvious advantage to university study. Canon William Moore Ede, a county councillor and later Dean of Worcester, convinced him to go and helped raise some of the fees; Lawson and his wife sold their furniture and saved what they could, and the rest was paid by his parents. His wife moved to Oxford with him, finding work and accommodation as a servant in a series of homes. Amongst his tutors, Hastings Lees-Smith, the vice-principal of Ruskin and a lecturer on economics, had a particular influence on Lawson.

At the end of the year, Lawson was offered a further six months scholarship on the same terms, and after working at Boldon over the winter to raise the money he began his second year of study in February 1908. Halfway through that year, he was told that the College Council had decided to extend his scholarship to cover the rest of the full year. It was suggested he should enter Manchester College, Oxford, to study for a degree. He was grateful but refused, not wanting a professional career; three months later, he returned to Boldon. He became well known around the county, as a speaker for both the ILP and the union. He was a negotiator for his union lodge and a delegate to the Miner's Council at Durham.

In 1909, he was invited by the union to run for Durham County Council, but he was not yet on the electoral register and was ineligible to stand. Pete Curran, Labour Member of Parliament (MP) for Jarrow, had made Lawson his election agent: this was unpaid, hard work, and consumed all of Lawson's spare time during campaigns, as he travelled to and around Jarrow division. Curran was hit by ill health in the January 1910 general election and had trouble campaigning. He lost by less than 100 votes and died within a week. The Lawson's first daughter, Irene, was born later that year. Whilst campaigning in the general election in December, Lawson was asked by friends in Chester-le-Street to stand for the position of checkweighman at Alma Colliery. Elected and paid by hewers, as a checkweighman he would be responsible for ensuring miners received the full amount due for the coal they dug and would act as their legal representative. Lawson was reluctant to leave manual work, but allowed his name to go forward. Labour lost Jarrow again; at the same time, the miners at Alma, elected him almost unanimously.

== Member of Parliament ==
Two years after moving there, Lawson was elected to the County Council for the Chester-le-Street division. He wrote a pamphlet campaigning for minimum wage for miners and was a leading figure in Durham during the miners' strike of 1912 on this issue. He and his wife had a second daughter, Edna, while his brother Will, whom he had tutored, took a diploma in Economics and Political Science at Ruskin. In 1913 he was a delegate to the Miner's International in Carlsbad. Journeying through Leipzig and Dresden, he saw the growing Prussian army, and once in the Balkans witnessed some of the troubles that would spark the first World War. When war broke out in 1914, Will Lawson became an officer in the Durham Light Infantry. Jack Lawson followed his example, volunteering for service; experienced with horses, he was assigned as a driver with the Royal Field Artillery, serving in France. Another brother, Tom, joined the Border Regiment. Will Lawson was sent to Ypres in January 1915, and died in battle thirteen months later on 27 March 1916.

Following the end of the war, Jack Lawson was granted temporary leave to contest the Seaham division of Durham in the 1918 general election; he campaigned against war reparations and won only a third of the votes against a coalition candidate. After that he was sent to Clipstone in Derbyshire, where he was demobbed. Returning to work at Alma Colliery and as a county councillor, he started to have health problems and was sick during the council elections the following year. The Labour Party, which entered the election with around a dozen out of one hundred councillors, won control of the council.

Later in 1919, John Taylor, Labour MP for Chester-le-Street since 1906 and a friend of Lawson's, resigned his seat due to ill health. Though reluctant to risk leaving Durham and the colliery for London and Parliament, Lawson was persuaded to stand for Labour in the by-election. He was sponsored by the Durham Miner's Association and won with a majority of eleven thousand, entering the House of Commons in November 1919.

Ramsay MacDonald appointed Lawson as Financial Secretary to the War Office in the 1924 Labour government. He worked alongside Clement Attlee, and the two came to enjoy a very firm friendship and mutual admiration. Both felt odd, controlling generals they'd served under a few years before, but the generals liked them, considering them less idle than their predecessors. He served as Parliamentary Secretary to the Ministry of Labour in the 1929 Labour government, but refused MacDonald's invitation to join the National Government following the split in 1931.

The 1931 general election was disastrous for Labour, and Lawson was one of only two Durham Labour MPs to keep their seats, out of seventeen who won there in the 1929 election. During the 1930s, Lawson supplemented his income as an MP by writing. He published his autobiography, A Man's Life, in 1932, intended as a record of the family life of miners. He followed this with a novel about miners, Under the Wheels, and biographies of Peter Lee and Herbert Smith. He also wrote for newspapers and periodicals.

== Elder statesman ==
When Attlee became leader of the Labour Party in 1935, he created a new Defence Committee for the party, appointing Lawson along with A. V. Alexander and Manny Shinwell. In April 1936, Lawson wrote a column in the Sunday Sun criticising the National Government's policy of appeasement: Entitled "Watch Winston", it predicted the government's policy of appeasement would result in war, and that Winston Churchill, at that time a marginal figure, would return to become prime minister. In April 1939, during the build-up to the Second World War, Sir John Anderson, the Home Secretary, appointed Lawson as Deputy Commissioner for Civil Defence in the Northern Region. This region covered Durham, Northumberland and the North Riding; Lawson oversaw preparations for aerial bombardment and possible invasion, and the organisation of shelter and relief when bombing began. Lawson later refused the offer of a position in government to continue his work in civil defence. His third daughter, Alma, was a gunner in the ATS; his son Clive, born in 1932, was killed aged 9 by a bomb on 1 May 1942.

With Labour's victory in the general election of July 1945, Lawson was appointed Secretary of State for War, with a seat in Attlee's Cabinet. During the closing months of the war, he travelled thousands of miles, visiting troops in India and the Far East, and speaking at military functions and mass meetings. His refusal to stick to the scheduled, whitewashed routes on official visits, insistence on seeing everything for himself, and willingness to stop and listen to everyone he met, made him unpopular with senior officers. However, he was very popular with soldiers, who were glad that one of their own was now in the War Office. Lawson oversaw planning for post-war operations, including the occupation of Germany, and for the mass demobilisation, ensuring it happened quickly and smoothly. He also served as one of Attlee's key allies in the Cabinet, particularly during early conflicts with Herbert Morrison. However, from the summer of 1946, Lawson found his job increasingly difficult: he suffered severe health problems and had to go into hospital, retiring from the front bench in October. Alan Brooke the wartime Army CIGS found Lawson charming and a religious man of high principles; but he had not the faintest idea of what his job required, and did not read papers sent to him.

In 1949, on Attlee's recommendation, the King appointed Jack Lawson as Lord Lieutenant of Durham. He resigned from parliament in December 1949 on appointment as vice-chairman of the National Parks Commission, he was made a hereditary peer as Baron Lawson, of Beamish in the County of Durham, in March 1950.

Whitehall, March 21, 1950. The KING has been pleased, by Letters Patent under the Great Seal of the Realm, bearing date the 17th instant, to confer the dignity of a Barony of the United Kingdom upon The Right Honourable John James Lawson, and the heirs male of his body lawfully begotten, by the name, style and title of Baron Lawson, of Beamish in the County of Durham.

Lords Lieutenant are unpaid, and Lawson, one of the first working-class men to hold such a position, received income support. He attended the House of Lords but did not take a front-bench position. Still a close friend of Attlee, he provided moral support during struggle to hold the Labour Party together during the 1950s. His protégé, Sam Watson, became General Secretary of the Durham Miners and one of the most influential trade unionists in the party.

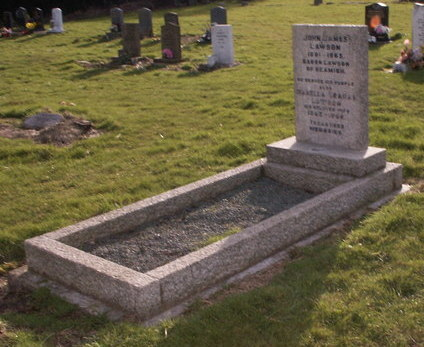
Lawson's grave in St Paul's Churchyard, West Pelton

Lawson retired as Lord Lieutenant in 1958 and died in 1965, at the age of 83. His hereditary peerage became extinct on his death.

The Lord Lawson of Beamish Community School is named in his honour. He was for years on friendly terms with the historian Sir Arthur Bryant, despite the latter's more right-wing outlook.

== Books ==
- John James Lawson (1944). A man's life. Hodder & Stoughton, 1944

His personal papers, including correspondence political, official, and personal, including a file of constituency correspondence for 1926–7, appointments diaries, journals, accounts and recollections by Lawson of politicians, politics, and travels abroad on official missions, fragments of an autobiography continuing A man's life, drafts of publications, speeches, broadcasts, sermon notes, cuttings and photographs - are held at the Durham University Library, Archives and Special Collections. Related collections also can be found at Liddell Hart Centre for Military Archives, King's College, London: Bryant Papers D/4, letters from Jack Lawson, early 1940s. Little of significance seems to have survived, however, from his periods of ministerial office.

Parliament of the United Kingdom
Preceded by John Taylor	Member of Parliament for Chester-le-Street; 1919–1949	Succeeded by Patrick Bartley
Political offices
Preceded by Rupert Gwynne	Financial Secretary to the War Office; 1924	Succeeded by Douglas King
Preceded by Sir P. J. Grigg	Secretary of State for War; 1945–1946	Succeeded by Frederick Bellenger
Honorary titles
Preceded by The Marquess of Londonderry	Lord Lieutenant of Durham; 1949–1958	Succeeded by The Lord Barnard
Peerage of the United Kingdom
New title	Baron Lawson; 1950–1965	Extinct
