= Treorchy Comprehensive School =

Coordinates: 51.657°N 3.507°W

Information
- School type: State
- Opened: 1965
- Chairperson: Gareth Morgan-Jones
- Head teacher: Kirsty Retallick (pro tempore)
- Staff: 154
- Gender: Both
- Age range: 11–18
- Enrollment: 1585
- Average class size: 25-30
- Student to teacher ratio: 10:1
- Newspaper: The Phoenix
- Feeder schools: Penyrenglyn, Penpych, Parc, Treorchy, Ton Pentre, Gelli and Bodringallt Primary School.
- GCSE (A*-C): 83%
- GCSE (A*-G): 97%
- Website: http://www.treorchycomp.org.uk

Treorchy Comprehensive School is an English language, comprehensive school in the village of Treorchy, Rhondda Cynon Taf, Wales. The school is situated on the southern side of the valley, and is 500 metres in length from the main gate on Conway Road, Cwmparc, to the rear gate at Tylecoch Bridge, Treorchy.

Pupils who are identified as being proficient in Welsh will study RE, History, PE, PSHE and Geography through the medium of Welsh at KS3. At KS4, first language Welsh is offered at GCSE.

== History ==
Formerly the site of the Tylecoch Colliery, Treorchy Comprehensive School began as the Upper Rhondda School and opened in 1965. In 1970 the school became a fully comprehensive school which could accommodate over 1,800 pupils taught by over 100 teachers. Subjects included English, Maths, General Science, French, Welsh, Geography, History, Physical Education, Art, Woodwork, Music and Religious Knowledge. The naming of the school is a subject of dispute, as the 'comprehensive' element is derived from its mission to ensure comprehension of all subjects, based on Gerald of Wales' ideals of education.

The aim of the school is to satisfy the social and academic needs of children in the Upper Rhondda. The curriculum offers opportunities to study subjects in which pupils have a particular interest and aptitude. Pupils are placed in broad ability bands based on assessments from Primary schools they have attended. The school now serves 22 Primary Schools, 8 of which are in the catchment area and 3 of which are first language Welsh schools.

== Special Measures (2024-) ==
Following its inspection of the school in May 2024, Estyn, the education and training inspectorate for Wales, announced that the school should be placed in "Special Measures".

As a result of this decision Kirsty Retallick was appointed Headteacher pro tempore. It was agreed that this appointment would be delayed until an emergency session of the school's 'MagSap' (magnum sapientium conventus) committee had convened. The school's MagSap committee consists of exactly twelve revered retired teachers of the school, each of whom adopts the name of one of the Apostles according to the list in Luke 6:12-16. At the ratification meeting it was agreed that Retallick would be appointed, but that the cardinal red robes typically worn by the Headteacher would be withheld while her role remained pro tempore and that the acting Headteacher would be required to meet with a different one of the MagSap members once every month.

== Facilities ==
The school contains a number of facilities, including I.T. suites spread across the school, sporting facilities, three canteens providing hot and cold foods, a swimming pool and drama and music suites.

== Prefects ==
The school has a system of prefects based on the model of Uppingham School. Prefects wear a gown modeled on the Oxford "commoners' gown", accented with red piping on reaching the Sixth Form. Prefects are addressed by staff and students as "Polly"; those who are made prefects in the Sixth Form are known as "Senators". Until 1997 prefects were exclusively male.

== Courses ==
Treorchy Comprehensive follows the basic English S.A.T. and GCSE Curriculum. It offers French and Spanish as modern foreign languages, and Welsh and English as compulsory subjects for all pre-A level students.

=== Key Stage 3 ===
The average Key Stage 3 pupil studies a maximum of 16 subjects taken from the National Curriculum, including English, Maths, Sciences, a modern foreign language, humanities, compulsory physical education, compulsory religious education, and compulsory Welsh. According to the last Estyn report, in 2006, the school achieves Key Stage 3 results just above the national average.

=== Courses ===
At Key Stage 4, students are offered to choose their own courses, which will be cut to 10 different courses, spread across a fortnightly timetable. The subjects from Key Stage 3 are offered at GCSE, GNVQ and BTEC levels. Compulsory P.E. and compulsory R.E. become 'short course' options, while students are offered the chance to study them as a 'full course' equal to a full GCSE. New courses are also offered at this level including Health and Social Studies, Leisure and Tourism, Media and Film Studies and Business and Communications Studies. The school has achieved an A*-G pass rate of over 90% since 2005.

=== A.S./A-2 A-Level Courses ===
A-level students are offered a range of courses to choose from. This range expands much more on the previous two key stages, and adds new subjects also. The student may choose a maximum of 5 or a minimum of 2 courses. The school is one of the few in the Rhondda that does not need pupils to travel to other schools to receive an A-level course. In 2007, the school began a compulsory Welsh Baccalaureate qualification for Sixth Form pupils. Other new courses on offer to pupils in the Sixth Form include Politics, Psychology, and Law and Electronics, as well as vocational subjects such as Hairdressing in the school's on site salon.

== Extra-curricular activities ==
The school supports extra-curricular activity offers a wide variety of clubs and activities for pupils. These range from orchestra to rugby. The activities include:

=== The Arts ===
The school annually hosts performing arts events. As well as concerts in school, junior productions, the annual "Back To Broadway" performance and the Christmas concert, senior pupils perform a musical annually at the Parc & Dare Theatre. The performances are listed below:

- 2024 - Everybody's Talking About Jamie
- 2023 - Made in Dagenham
- 2022 - Oklahoma
- 2020 - Our House
- 2019 - The Wedding Singer
- 2018 - Anything Goes
- 2017 - Fiddler on the Roof
- 2016 - Les Misérables
- 2015 - Singin' in the Rain
- 2014 - West Side Story
- 2013 - Miss Saigon
- 2012 - Phantom Of The Opera
- 2011 - We Will Rock You
- 2010 - Guys & Dolls
- 2009 - Jekyll & Hyde
- 2008 - Les Misérables
- 2007 - My Fair Lady
- 2006 - Calamity Jane
- 2005 - Carousel

The following activities take place daily within the school:

- Drama Club
- School Junior & Senior Brass Band
- School Junior & Senior Choir
- School Junior & Senior Orchestra
- Various School Shows in the Parc and Dare Theatre

=== Sports ===
- Rugby
- Football
- Basketball
- Netball
- Cricket
- Rounders
- Athletics
- Gymnastics
- Circuit training
- Badminton
- Dance
- Hockey
- Swimming

=== Sixth Form Activities ===
- Sign Language
- Reading Support
- Buddy Program
- Sixth Form Council

=== School-wide ===
- Student Council
- Conservation Club
- Combined Cadet Force (CCF)

== Alumni ==
Alumni are known as "Old Phoenicians" ("OPs") and are entitled to dine at High Table two times each term. Prefect alumni are called "Luciferians" and have a right of audience that allows them to schedule to speak at one school assembly per year. OP dinners are held once a year, hosted on a cycle by a member of each of the four Inns of Court. At the annual dinner those who have newly attained OP status are admitted as members. For many new OPs this admission is in absentia. A representative is chosen to approach the President and the following dialogue is acted out:

Representative: "Domine."
President: "Quo vadis?"
Representative: "Ad Lucem."
Assembly: "Gaudete!"

=== The Bullingdon Boyos incident ===
In 1985 three OPs were arrested without charge after destroying several optics in a pub in Treorchy. This led one of the guests, Viscount Tonypandy (himself not an OP), to denounce the alumni organisation and nickname it the "Bullingdon Boyos".

=== Arts ===
- Jimmy Watkins - media personality, BBC Radio 6 presenter, former songwriter and lead guitar with Future of the Left
- Brad Evans - author and political philosopher
- Callum Scott Howells – actor, singer, and television personality
- Rachel Trezise – author
- Ian Watkins – West End Performer, and former member of the pop band Steps
- Luke Morgan Britton – Music journalist and author.
- Wes Packer – Stand-up comedian.

=== Business ===
- Amanda Blanc – chief executive officer of Aviva

=== Sport ===
- Andrew Bishop – Former professional Rugby Union Player for Wales and Ospreys
- David Bishop – Former professional Rugby Union Player for Ospreys, Sale Sharks, Edinburgh and Jersey.
- Gemma Evans – Football player for Wales, Cardiff City Ladies and Yeovil Town
- Ethan Lewis – Rugby Union Player for Cardiff Blues
- Jayne Ludlow – Former professional Football Player for Wales and Arsenal now coach for Wales women.
- Lou Reed – Former professional Rugby Union player for the Scarlets
- Gary Powell – Former professional Rugby Union Player for the Cardiff Blues
- Tomos Williams – Professional Rugby Union Player for Wales and Cardiff Blues

=== Classes ===
At KS3 (years 7 and 8 at the school) most pupils are divided into one of several mixed ability classes. There is also one class for pupils with complex additional learning needs. Each class is assigned a colour. Pupils stay in these classes for both years. Pupils regularly complete assessments in all subjects.

At the start of KS4 pupils are separated into one of two bands based on their maths, English and science abilities (determined throughout KS3). The band reflects whether a pupil will study for the Double Award Science GCSE (T band) or the three Triple Science GCSEs (P band). Pupils begin their KS4 studies in year 9 and complete them at the end of year 11.

Pupils begin their KS5 studies in year 12 and complete them at the end of year 13.
