= Paul Wigley =

Paul Wigley FLSW is professor of animal microbial ecosystems at the University of Bristol. Born in Neath and growing up in Cwmparc, Rhondda, he studied immunology at King's College London and completed a PhD in molecular microbiology with the Open University. After postdoctoral work at the Institute for Animal Health he worked at University of Liverpool 2004–2022, developing a research programmes in infection and immunity of bacterial infections of chickens (Salmonella] Campylobacter'), poultry health in developing countries and the chicken intestinal microbiome.

He joined the University of Bristol in 2022.

He was elected a Fellow of the Learned Society of Wales in 2022.
