= David Bishop (rugby union, born 1983) =

Welsh rugby union player

- Born: David Bishop; 22 September 1983 (age 43) Church Village, Wales
- Height: 189 cm (6 ft 2 in)
- Weight: 105 kg (16 st 7 lb; 231 lb)
- School: Treorchy Comprehensive School
- University: University of Wales Institute Cardiff
- Notable relative: Andrew Bishop

Rugby union career
- Position: Centre
Senior career
Years	Team	Apps	(Points)
- Treorchy
- Bridgend
2003–2004	Warriors		
2004–2009	Ospreys	22	(20)
2009–2010	Sale Sharks	15	(0)
2010	Dragons	1	(0)
2010	Edinburgh	2	(0)
2011	Birmingham Moseley	6	(0)
2011–2015	Jersey Reds	39	(12)
International career
Years	Team	Apps	(Points)
2003	Wales U21		

David Bishop (born 22 September 1983) is a former Wales rugby union footballer who played at centre. Bishop primarily played for Ospreys, Sale Sharks, and Jersey.

== Professional career ==
Bishop attended Treorchy Comprehensive School Treorchy Comprehensive from September 1995 to July 2002. His brother Andrew, was also a rugby union centre and has played for the Wales national rugby union team. In 2003, Bishop represented Wales at under–21 level.

Bishop began his professional career in the 2003–04 Celtic League, playing for the Celtic Warriors.

He joined the Ospreys in 2004 after the disbandment of the Celtic Warriors, scoring a try on his debut against Munster. In September 2005 suffered a serious knee injury in a game against Munster. At the time, Bishop had recently been called into the training squad for the Wales by head coach Mike Ruddock. This injury kept Bishop out of competitive rugby for nearly three years, first returning to play for Bridgend Ravens in 2007, before making his competitive return to the Ospreys in September 2008, against Glasgow. Bishop was released by the Ospreys at the end of the 2008–09 season, making six appearances following his return from injury, and 22 in total for the club.

Following his release, Bishop joined Sale Sharks on a one-year contract. He departed the club at the conclusion of the season.

In August 2010 he joined Newport Gwent Dragons on a two month trial. He made his first appearance in a preseason friendly against London Irish and came off the bench in the first match of the season against Connacht. Bishop ultimately did not sign a longer term contract, and subsequently joined Edinburgh on a short term deal.

Following the completion of his contract at Edinburgh, Bishop joined Birmingham Moseley in January 2011. In June 2011, Bishop signed with Neath RFC, but shortly after joined National League One team Jersey, prior to the beginning of the season.

During his first season with Jersey, Bishop helped the club gain promotion to the RFU Championship, their fourth promotion in five seasons. Jersey maintained their position in the Championship throughout Bishop's time with the club, narrowly avoiding relegation in 2014. Bishop retired at the end of the 2014–15 season, and served as club captain on numerous occasions.
