= Sam Ramsey =

Wales international rugby union player

- Born: Samuel H. Ramsey Scotland
- Died: Rhiwbina, Wales
- Notable relative: Anne Ramsey (Niece)
- Occupation: collier

Rugby union career
- Position: Forward
Amateur team(s)
Years	Team	Apps	(Points)
–	Treorchy RFC		
International career
Years	Team	Apps	(Points)
1896–1904	Wales	2	(0)

Samuel Ramsey (1873 – 14 January 1956) was a Scottish-born rugby union forward who played club rugby for Treorchy and international rugby for Wales. Ramsey is noted as being one of the first 'Rhondda forwards', impact players selected by the Welsh Rugby Union to not only take, but also hand out physical abuse.

== Rugby career ==
Although born in Scotland, Ramsey moved to the Rhondda Valley in Wales where he became a collier during the industrial growth of the area in the late Victorian period. Ramsey joined local team Treorchy in the early 1890s and in the 1892/93 season was made team captain, holding the captaincy the next season too. In 1896 became the first 'Rhondda forward' when he was selected to represent Wales as part of the 1896 Home Nations Championship in an away game to England. Ramsey was brought in to replace Jim Hannan in an aging Welsh pack, under the captaincy of Arthur Gould. The game was disastrous for Wales, with England running in seven tries without reply. The selectors reacted by replacing six of the Welsh pack for the next game, including five new caps; Ramsey was one of those replaced.

Surprisingly, Ramsey was reselected eight years later for his second and final game, another encounter with England, this time as part of the 1904 Home Nations Championship. Ramsey was a temporary replacement for one of the most notable 'Rhondda forwards', Dai 'Tarw' Jones, another collier, who played club rugby for Treherbert. The Welsh team for the match against England, contained many greats of the Welsh game, including Teddy Morgan, Rhys Gabe and Gwyn Nicholls. The Welsh team should have been victorious, but were hampered by poor officiating from the referee. The match ended in a 14–all draw, but the next match Ramsey was replaced by Edwin Thomas Maynard, and never represented his country again.

=== International matches played ===
Wales

- England 1896, 1904

== Bibliography ==
- Godwin, Terry (1984). The International Rugby Championship 1883-1983. London: Willows Books. ISBN 0-00-218060-X.
- Griffiths, Terry (1987). The Phoenix Book of International Rugby Records. London: Phoenix House. ISBN 0-460-07003-7.
- Smith, David; Williams, Gareth (1980). Fields of Praise: The Official History of The Welsh Rugby Union. Cardiff: University of Wales Press. ISBN 0-7083-0766-3.
