= George Thomas, 1st Viscount Tonypandy =

Welsh politician (1909–1997)

The Right Honourable The Viscount Tonypandy PC
- Thomas, c. 1955

Speaker of the House of Commons of the United Kingdom
- In office 3 February 1976 – 15 June 1983
- Monarch: Elizabeth II
- Prime Minister: Harold Wilson; James Callaghan; Margaret Thatcher
- Preceded by: Selwyn Lloyd
- Succeeded by: Bernard Weatherill

Deputy Speaker of the House of Commons Chairman of Ways and Means
- In office 12 March 1974 – 3 February 1976
- Speaker: Selwyn Lloyd
- Preceded by: Robert Grant-Ferris
- Succeeded by: Oscar Murton

Secretary of State for Wales
- In office 6 April 1968 – 19 June 1970
- Prime Minister: Harold Wilson
- Preceded by: Cledwyn Hughes
- Succeeded by: Peter Thomas

Minister of State for Commonwealth Affairs
- In office 7 January 1967 – 6 April 1968
- Prime Minister: Harold Wilson
- Preceded by: Judith Hart
- Succeeded by: Malcolm Shepherd

Minister of State for Wales
- In office 6 April 1966 – 7 January 1967
- Prime Minister: Harold Wilson
- Preceded by: Goronwy Roberts
- Succeeded by: Eirene White

Parliamentary Under-Secretary of State for the Home Department
- In office 20 October 1964 – 6 April 1966
- Prime Minister: Harold Wilson
- Preceded by: Mervyn Pike; Montague Woodhouse
- Succeeded by: Maurice Foley; Dick Taverne

Member of the House of Lords Lord Temporal
- In office 11 July 1983 – 22 September 1997; Hereditary peerage
- Preceded by: Peerage created
- Succeeded by: Peerage extinct

Member of Parliament for Cardiff West Cardiff Central (1945–1950)
- In office 5 July 1945 – 13 May 1983
- Preceded by: Ernest Bennett
- Succeeded by: Stefan Terlezki

Personal details
- Born: Thomas George Thomas; 29 January 1909 Port Talbot, Wales
- Died: 22 September 1997 (aged 88) Cardiff, Wales
- Party: Labour (1945–1976); Speaker (1976–1983); Crossbench (1983–1997)
- Education: University College, Southampton
- Profession: Teaching

Thomas George Thomas, 1st Viscount Tonypandy (29 January 1909 – 22 September 1997) was a Welsh politician who served as a member of parliament (MP) and Speaker of the House of Commons from 1976 to 1983. He was first elected as a Labour MP in the 1945 general election.

Born in Port Talbot, South Wales, he initially worked as a teacher in both London and Cardiff. An MP from 1945 to 1983, he held office in Harold Wilson's 1964–1970 Labour administration, notably as Secretary of State for Wales from 1968 to 1970. As a junior minister at the Welsh Office, he was one of the first on the scene of the Aberfan disaster (21 October 1966), and was later involved in the controversial government decision to use money from the Aberfan Charity Fund to clear remaining National Coal Board waste tips from around the village.

In 1976 Thomas was elected Speaker, in which role the first broadcasting of parliamentary proceedings brought him unprecedented public attention. He is the most recent Speaker to have served as a government minister before becoming Speaker. He retired from Parliament in June 1983 and, on 11 July 1983 by letters patent, was elevated to the peerage as Viscount Tonypandy, of Rhondda in the County of Mid Glamorgan.

== Early life and education ==
Thomas was born in Port Talbot, Glamorgan, the second son of Zachariah Thomas, a Welsh-speaking miner from Carmarthen, and Emma Jane Tilbury, daughter of a founder of the English Methodist Church in Tonypandy. He had two elder sisters, Ada May and Dolly, one elder brother Emrys and one younger brother Ivor. His father became a heavy drinker and the family were happy when he joined up at the start of the First World War. They were less pleased when Emma had to take her marriage certificate to court to prove she was Zachariah's wife and not the woman in Kent to whom he had allocated his soldier allowance. He never returned to South Wales and died of tuberculosis in 1925.

Thomas was raised by his mother in the village of Trealaw in South Wales, just across the Rhondda Fawr river from the town of Tonypandy. All four of his siblings left school at age 13. His two sisters went into domestic service, his elder brother went to work in a coal mine, and his younger brother worked in a shop. He attended Trealaw Boys' School where he passed the scholarship examination for Tonypandy Higher Grade School, later promoted to Tonypandy Secondary Grammar School. On leaving school Thomas became a pupil teacher, first in Trealaw and then in Fanshawe Crescent School, Dagenham, Essex, after which he did a two-year teacher-training course at University College, Southampton. He then worked as a teacher in both London and Cardiff.

== Political career ==
Elected to Parliament in the Attlee landslide at the 1945 general election, Thomas held Cardiff Central between 1945 and 1950, and Cardiff West between 1950 and his retirement from the Commons at the 1983 general election. When the Labour Party came to power under Harold Wilson in 1964, Thomas was made joint Under-Secretary of State for the Home Department, In April 1966 he was appointed Minister of State for Wales, and was one of the first on the scene of the Aberfan disaster in October 1966.

Thomas initially showed sympathy to the people of the village, where a NCB colliery spoil tip slid down a hillside and engulfed houses and a primary school, killing 144 people, 116 of them children. Disagreements subsequently arose, when Thomas refused to order the removal of the other tips surrounding the village, for which the villagers were campaigning. When the government ultimately acceded to the demands for removal, it took £150,000 from the Aberfan relief fund – raised to help the victims of the disaster and their families – in part payment of the costs. Just over 30 years later, the money was refunded by the newly appointed Secretary of State for Wales Ron Davies who described it as, "a wrong that needed to be righted."

In early 1967 he became Minister of State for Commonwealth Affairs. As Secretary of State for Wales from 1968 to 1970 he presided over the investiture of the Prince of Wales at Caernarfon Castle in 1969. Thomas was fervently attached to the Royal Family and also strongly opposed to Plaid Cymru, and particularly to the Welsh Language Society.

In 1974 Thomas was elected Chairman of Ways and Means and Deputy Speaker of the House of Commons. Two years later he succeeded Selwyn Lloyd as Speaker of the House of Commons. The first broadcasting of parliamentary proceedings (although only the sound was broadcast until 1989, not live pictures) brought him unprecedented public attention, but he proved more impartial than party colleagues had expected. In June 1983 he retired and, a month later, on 11 July 1983, he was raised to the peerage with a hereditary peerage as Viscount Tonypandy, of Rhondda in the County of Mid Glamorgan. Thomas's was the last creation of a Viscountcy as the senior title for a non-royal person in the UK; William Whitelaw, who is often cited as the last such creation, received his in June 1983, a month earlier than Thomas.

In 1983 Thomas was awarded the degree of Doctor of Laws (LLD) honoris causa by the University of Leeds. The same year he was the subject of the television show This Is Your Life, when he was surprised by Eamonn Andrews at London's Royal Albert Hall, ahead of a charity concert for the National Children's Homes.

In the House of Lords Thomas was an outspoken critic of the European Union and the Maastricht Treaty, and in a June 1993 debate, he endorsed Margaret Thatcher's comments and defended her after Roy Jenkins had criticised her similar "extreme" views against further European sociopolitical integration.

Thomas's opposition to Welsh nationalism was finally expressed in hostility to the Blair government's devolution proposals of 1997. He was asked by Robert Hodge, son of Sir Julian Hodge, to be a member of the steering committee of the "Just Say No" campaign (which opposed devolution in 1997). Despite ailing from cancer, Thomas agreed to a ceremonial role and became president. Other known persons in the movement included Nick Bourne, David Davies (Monmouth MP) and Alun Cairns.

During that year, he also gave his very high-profile endorsement of Sir James Goldsmith's Referendum Party, believing that the European Union was compromising the sovereignty of Parliament. He also wrote the foreword to Adrian Hilton's book on this issue, The Principality and Power of Europe.

Outside Parliament, Lord Tonypandy was Chairman of the Bank of Wales between 1985 and 1991.

A portrait of Thomas in the robes of the Speaker is part of the Parliamentary Art Collection.

== Personal life ==
Following Lord Tonypandy's death, former Welsh Labour MP Leo Abse revealed that Thomas had been homosexual and had been blackmailed because of it. Abse, the MP who introduced the private member's bill which partially decriminalised homosexuality in Britain, discussed this incident in his book Tony Blair: The Man Behind the Smile. He said that Thomas had paid money to blackmailers to keep information related to his private life secret. Abse said that he had once lent Thomas £800 to pay off blackmailers, and had also provided advice when Thomas contracted a venereal disease from a rent boy. Abse wrote that, while being otherwise a tough and fearless politician, Thomas would "dangerously over-react and panic if there was the slightest sign of a crack in the thin ice upon which he skated all this life ... The slightest tremor of scandal ... reduced him to a jelly." He also explained that he had decided to reveal Thomas's sexuality because he thought that "the gifts he gave to the nation fundamentally arose because of, not despite, his sexual orientation", adding that he brought "a feminine sensibility and empathy" to politics.

Throughout his career Thomas remained a deeply religious man, and was a prominent member of the Methodist Church. He was a local preacher and former Vice-President of the Methodist Conference. Known by the nickname "Tommy Twice" (from his full name), his Welsh-accented cries of "Order! Order!" as Speaker were familiar to a generation of Britons.

Lord Tonypandy died in Cardiff on 22 September 1997. He was twice engaged to be married but he never did, so there was no heir to the viscountcy, which became extinct. He is buried at Trealaw Cemetery.

== 'Bullingdon Boyos' ==
In April 1985, Thomas was the guest of honour at the 'Easter Bacchanal' of the Treorchy Comprehensive School Alumni Association (Thomas himself was not an alumnus of the school). During his speech, Thomas was heckled by several pro-European alumni. When he tried to calm the atmosphere, the hecklers threw items of cutlery at him which hit and smashed several drinks optics. The result was a significant extra bill to the Alumni Association, and the denunciation of the group by Thomas as the 'Bullingdon Boyos'. At the time of the incident, Thomas was alleged to have been at fault for instigating the group, but this was later shown to be inaccurate.

== Allegations of sexual abuse ==
In July 2014, British media carried reports that the South Wales Police were investigating allegations that Thomas had sexually abused a boy aged nine in the late 1960s. In March 2015, South Wales Police confirmed that they were investigating claims that he had been involved in child abuse. The probe ended in March 2017 with no action being taken.

== Arms ==
Coat of arms of George Thomas, 1st Viscount Tonypandy
Coronet of a viscount Crest A miner's lamp between two daffodils slipped and leaved proper. Torse Or and Vert Escutcheon Or an open book proper bound Sable garnished Gules. On a chief of the last between two portcullises Or a pale per pale Argent and Or, charged with three chevrons gules. Supporters Dexter: A Coal Miner c. 1930 in his working clothes wearing a Cloth Cap proper, holding in the exterior hand a miner's lamp proper. Sinister: A Serjeant-at Arms habited in court dress as worn on state occasions, his cocked hat under his exterior arm, the hand thereof gloved and grasping the hilt of his sword proper. Motto Bid Ben Bid Bont (Welsh: Let the leader be a bridge)

== Bibliography ==
- Bloch, Michael; Parris, Matthew (2015). Closet queens: some 20th century British politicians. London: Little, Brown. ISBN 978-1-4087-0412-7.
- Thomas, George (1985). George Thomas, Mr Speaker: The Memoirs of Viscount Tonypandy. London: Century. ISBN 9780712607063.
- Thomas, George (1986). My Wales. with photographs by Lord Snowdon. London: Guild Publishing. ISBN 0-7126-1897-X.

Parliament of the United Kingdom
Preceded by Ernest Bennett	Member of Parliament for Cardiff Central; 1945–1950	Constituency abolished
New constituency	Member of Parliament for Cardiff West; 1950–1983	Succeeded by Stefan Terlezki
Preceded by Robert Grant-Ferris	Chairman of Ways and Means; 1974–1976	Succeeded by Oscar Murton
Preceded by Selwyn Lloyd	Speaker of the House of Commons; 1976–1983	Succeeded by Bernard Weatherill
Political offices
Preceded by Hon. Montague Woodhouse	Joint Under-Secretary of State for the Home Department; 1964–1966; Served alongside: The Lord Stonham	Succeeded by The Lord Stonham
Preceded by Mervyn Pike	Joint Under-Secretary of State for the Home Department; 1964–1966; Served alongside: The Lord Stonham	Succeeded by Maurice Foley
Preceded by Goronwy Roberts	Minister of State for Wales; 1966–1967	Succeeded by Eirene White
Preceded by Judith Hart	Joint Minister of State for Commonwealth Affairs; 1967–1968; Served alongside: Judith Hart (1967); The Lord Shepherd (1967–1968)	Succeeded by The Lord Shepherd
Preceded by Cledwyn Hughes	Secretary of State for Wales; 1968–1970	Succeeded by Peter Thomas
