= Ethan Lewis =

Welsh rugby union player

- Full name: Ethan Lewis
- Born: 28 March 1994 (age 32) Church Village, Wales
- Height: 180 cm (5 ft 11 in)
- Weight: 105 kg (16 st 7 lb; 231 lb)
- School: Treorchy Comprehensive School

Rugby union career
- Position: Hooker
- Current team: Ospreys
Youth career
- Cardiff Blues U-18
Amateur team(s)
Years	Team	Apps	(Points)
- Treorchy RFC
2012-	Cardiff RFC	57	(10)
Senior career
Years	Team	Apps	(Points)
2014–2022	Cardiff Blues	46	(10)
2021–2022	Saracens (loan)		
2022-2023	Saracens		
2023-	Ospreys		
International career
Years	Team	Apps	(Points)
2012-13	Wales U18		
2013-14	Wales U20	14	(5)

Ethan Lewis (born 28 March 1994) is a Welsh rugby union player who plays as a hooker for Ospreys. He was a Wales under-18 and under-20 international.

Lewis made his debut for the Cardiff Blues in 2014 having previously played for their academy and Cardiff RFC.

He joined Saracens, firstly on loan, in 2021, before joining permanently.

In 2023, he signed for the Ospreys.
