= David James (rugby, born 1906) =

Wales international rugby union & league footballer

David Rees James
Personal information
- Full name: David Rees James
- Born: 7 October 1906 Treorchy, Wales
- Died: c.-1981 (aged 74–75) Rhondda, Wales

Playing information

Rugby union
- Position: Hooker
Club
Years	Team	Pld	T	G	FG	P
≤1931–≥31	Treorchy RFC
Representative
Years	Team	Pld	T	G	FG	P
1931	Wales	2	0	0	0	0

Rugby league
- Position: Hooker
Club
Years	Team	Pld	T	G	FG	P
≥1931–≥31	Leeds
- Source: scrum.com

David Rees James (7 October 1906 – c. 1981) was a Welsh rugby union, and professional rugby league footballer who played in the 1930s. He played representative level rugby union (RU) for Wales.

James was born in Treorchy, he played club level rugby union (RU) for Treorchy RFC, as a Hooker and club level rugby league (RL) for Leeds, as a hooker. He died in Rhondda.

== International honours ==
David James won caps for Wales (RU) while at Treorchy RFC in 1931 against France, and Ireland.
