= Luc Evans =

Wales international rugby union footballer

- Full name: Iwan Luc Evans
- Born: 13 June 1971 (age 55) Treorchy, Wales
- Notable relative: Daniel Evans (brother)

Rugby union career
- Position: Utility back
International career
Years	Team	Apps	(Points)
1991	Wales	1	(0)

Iwan Luc Evans (born 13 June 1971) is a Welsh former rugby union international.

Raised in the Rhondda Valley, Evans was a utility back who played most often in the position of fullback. He was on the Wales squad for the 1991 tour of Australia and played one tour match, before earning his only Test cap as a substitute against France in the 1991 Five Nations, to replace injured winger Ieuan Evans with five minutes remaining. During his career, Evans played for Treorchy, Bridgend, Llanelli and Swansea, before retiring aged 26 to study medicine.

Evans later become a dentist in Newcastle, New South Wales, after emigrating to Australia in 2007.

== See also ==
- List of Wales national rugby union players
