= James Childs Gould =

British politician

James Childs Gould (9 September 1882 – 2 July 1944) was a British industrialist and Conservative Party politician who served as Member of Parliament for Cardiff Central from 1918 to 1924.

== Personal life ==
Gould was born in Penarth, the son of Richard Gould, a stonemason from Devon.

He was brought up in Canton, Cardiff, and educated at Higher Grade School, Cardiff.

In 1906 he married May B. Flagg, of Grand Manan, New Brunswick.

== Career ==
Gould left school at the age of 14 and started work for 4 shillings a week.

In 1901 he obtained a position as an ordinary sailor on the ship Clan Graham, and sailed for South Africa where he worked as a piecemeal laborer. He later moved from South Africa to New York where he worked for an insurance company.

In 1912 he opened his own insurance company in London with offices in Belgium and Germany. The business closed within a year and Gould won a £20,000 award against a partner in New York for misrepresentation.

In 1915, with a capital of £200, Gould committed to buy the SS Dartsmouth for £36,000. Due to the need for ships during the First World War to carry troops and goods, the venture was extremely successful, bringing capital to Gould and his company, Goulds Steamships & Industrials Ltd of £60,000 within 6 months. The profits were re-invested with the purchase of a £1,000,000 navy and shipbuilding business. By the end of the War it was estimated that Gould's personal fortune was around £2 million. After the war there was a major recession in the maritime sector, with the number of shipping companies in Cardiff falling from 150 to 77; the Gould company went bankrupt with debts of over £750,000 in May 1925. In March 1926 he was discharged from bankruptcy on condition of paying £50,000 towards his debts. He failed to pay the £50,000 and was made bankrupt again in 1933. He was acquitted of the second bankruptcy, postponed for two years, in June 1934.

== Political career ==
Gould was a member of the City of Cardiff Council between 1917 and 1918. He stood for the Unionist Party (effectively the Conservative Party) in the elections of 1918, 1922 and 1923, winning the Cardiff Central constituency. As his debtors were congregating, and an MP could not be bankrupt, he decided not to contest the 1924 election, and his Parliamentary career came to an end.

== Death ==
He died at his home in Coulsdon, Surrey, England at the age of 61.

Parliament of the United Kingdom
New constituency	Member of Parliament for Cardiff Central; 1918 – 1924	Succeeded by Lewis Lougher
