= Ernest Bennett (politician) =

British politician (1865–1947)

Sir Ernest Nathaniel Bennett
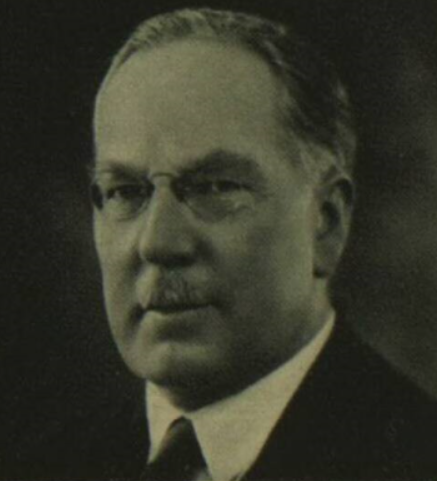
- Bennett in 1932

Personal details
- Born: Ernest Nathaniel Bennett; 12 December 1865 Colombo, Ceylon (now Sri Lanka)
- Died: 2 February 1947 (aged 81)
- Resting place: Wolvercote Cemetery, Oxford
- Party: Liberal (1906–1916); Labour (1916–1931); National Labour (1931–1945)
- Spouse: Marguerite Kleinwort (m. 1915)
- Children: Francis Bennett; Frederic Bennett; Marguerite Bennett
- Parent(s): George Bennett; Eliza Fewson
- Education: Durham School; Wadham College, Oxford; Hertford College, Oxford
- Alma mater: University of Oxford
- Occupation: Fellow of Hertford College (1891–1915); War correspondent Member of Parliament
- Profession: Academic, politician, explorer, writer
- Known for: War correspondence, psychical research
- Awards: Serbian Order of the White Eagle; Knight Bachelor (1930)

Sir Ernest Nathaniel Bennett (12 December 1865 – 2 February 1947) was a British academic, politician, explorer and writer.

== Lineage ==
Ernest Bennett's grandfather, Thomas Bennett (of Roseacre, Lancashire), was born in 1785 and died in 1868. He married Rachel Diggle in 1812, by whom he had a number of children, three of which obtained scholarships to go on to university from Kirkham Grammar School. They were Peter Bennett (vicar of Forcett, Yorkshire), George Bennett (of whom presently), and Edward Bennett (vicar of Laneham, Nottinghamshire). George Bennett (1826–1897) was educated at Trinity College, Dublin, where he received a M.A. degree. Like his two brothers (above), George became a clergyman and was canon of St. Paul's on the island of Saint Helena in the 1850s. He followed Piers Claughton (the first Bishop of Saint Helena) to Colombo, Sri Lanka, where he was Warden of St. Thomas' College and chaplain to the Bishop from 1863 to 1866. Upon his return to the UK, George became Master of Kirby Hill Grammar School (which closed in 1957 and is now owned by the Landmark Trust). He concluded his ecclesiastical career as the Rector of Rede, Suffolk (1885–96). George married Eliza, the daughter of Captain Thomas Fewson of the East India Company, in 1856, by whom he had three children: Mary (eldest), Ernest, and Gertrude.

Ernest Nathaniel Bennett was born in 1865 in Colombo, Sri Lanka.

== Academic career ==
Bennett was educated at Durham School and went up to Wadham College, Oxford in 1885. He transferred from Wadham to Hertford College on a five-year scholarship in the same year. Bennett obtained a First in Classical Moderations (the first part of Literae Humanores, or "Greats") in 1887, and a First also in the final exams in 1889. He then studied for a second B.A. degree in Theology, for which he secured another First in the exams in 1890. Bennett was elected a Fellow of Hertford in 1891. He continued to be actively involved in the work of the college, while also lecturing for Wadham, Pembroke and Lincoln colleges, until 1906 when he was elected to Parliament. Bennett remained a non-resident Fellow until 1915, when his marriage required his resignation (many college Fellowships of that era required that holders be unmarried). He published a number of academic studies during this period.

== War correspondent ==
Bennett served as a war correspondent during the Cretan insurrection in 1897. He was registered with the Turks, but was captured by the Greeks, threatened with execution, and only released on his recognition by a Greek officer who happened to have known him at Oxford. In 1898, he joined the British expedition to Khartoum led by General Kitchener, again as a war correspondent. He witnessed the Battle of Omdurman, in which an Anglo-Egyptian army of 25,000 defeated some 50,000 Ansar (or Dervish) followers of the Khalifa to the Mahdi. He wrote an article shortly afterwards for the Contemporary Review in which he complained of British atrocities against wounded Dervishes after the battle, which provoked a hostile reaction from patriotic readers in Britain. He exchanged views on this and other matters with Winston Churchill (also present at the battle and whom he met en route), and the subsequent books of both authors on the subject of the battle acknowledged the other. In 1899 he joined the Voluntary Ambulance Corps in South Africa at the outset of the Boer War, and wrote a book about his experiences. In 1911, Bennett was accredited as a correspondent for the Manchester Guardian to cover the Italo-Turkish War in what is now Libya. He was attached to the Turkish Army, and during this time he got to know Kemal Atatürk. Bennett later worked as a press censor for the Turkish Army in Thrace during the Balkan War, and was made a Pasha in reward.

== Military and Red Cross service ==
In 1900 (through 1902), Bennett assumed command (as a Lieutenant) of a platoon of Oxford University Volunteers of the 1st Battalion of the Oxfordshire and Buckinghamshire Light Infantry in the Orange River Colony during the Boer War. Too old to serve on the front line in the First World War, Bennett was initially a British Red Cross (BRX) Commissioner in Belgium, France and Serbia (1914–15). Bennett sailed for Serbia in January 1915 with Sir Thomas Lipton in the latter's yacht, the Erin, which had been dedicated to the transport of medical personnel and supplies for the BRX, initially to France and subsequently to the Balkans. The BRX Mission was responding to a catastrophic outbreak of typhus which had started in Serbian camps holding Austrian prisoners of war and was spreading rapidly to the Serbian population. Some 150,000 people are believed to have died from typhus during this epidemic, which was so virulent that it interrupted military action in Serbia for nearly six months until it was brought under control. Of the 350 Serbian doctors in the country, more than a third also died of the disease while treating their patients. Bennett (though not medically qualified himself) was put in charge of the second BRX unit (of two units deployed). The Serbian Commander in Chief Radomir Putnik personally commended Bennett on the conditions in his unit's hospital at the Villa Zlatibor in Vrnjačka Banja, and Bennett was later awarded the Serbian Order of the White Eagle (third class) in recognition of his services. Bennett left Serbia in June 1915, by which time the epidemic had been largely subdued. A few months after this, military activity resumed, the Serbian front collapsed and the hospital was overrun by the Austrians. Bennett later joined the Staff of the 11th Infantry Brigade, British Expeditionary Force, and was then attached to the IX Army Corps H.Q. in 1917, with the rank of Captain. He also worked with the Admiralty Intelligence Division. He concluded his military service, with the British Army of the Rhine HQ, in 1919.

== Political career ==
Bennett was elected Liberal Member of Parliament for Woodstock, Oxfordshire, in 1906. He campaigned, inter alia, in favour of women's suffrage. In 1904, he tried (as prospective candidate) to recruit the support of Winston Churchill (a fellow Liberal at the time) for women's suffrage, asking him to speak to the subject in Bicester. Churchill declined the offer. Bennett lost the Woodstock seat in 1910. In 1916, Bennett left the Liberal Party and joined the Labour Party. He contested a number of seats as a Labour candidate in successive elections, until he finally secured Cardiff Central in 1929. He retained this seat in 1931 and 1935, before retiring from politics in 1945.

Bennett was highly critical of the terms of the Versailles Treaty (concluding the First World War in 1919), which he considered to be inconsistent with Woodrow Wilson's Fourteen Points (the basis of the Armistice with Germany), too harsh and liable to sow the seeds of renewed conflict. Quite apart from the excessive financial burden that the reparations placed on Germany, Bennett believed that the Treaty put too much blame on Germany for starting the War, when in reality the whole of Europe had been dragged into unintended global conflict by a multitude of bilateral treaties and alliances triggered by a relatively local dispute between Serbia and Austria-Hungary. By virtue of his marriage into the Kleinwort dynasty (of which more presently), Bennett had acquired a significant German dimension to his family. He was anxious to avoid another war, especially one which would involve strife within his new enlarged family.

Through his involvement with the Labour Party, Bennett became close to Ramsay MacDonald, Labour Party leader from 1922 to 1935. MacDonald was likewise opposed to the terms of the Versailles Treaty, and sought to mollify them in his period as Prime Minister of the short lived Labour government in 1924. Bennett was also friendly with Philip Snowden, who became godfather to Bennett's eldest son. When MacDonald formed a new government in 1929, Snowden became his Chancellor of Exchequer. In 1931, the economic situation had deteriorated significantly. The cabinet was split on how to address the situation. MacDonald supported further austerity, and unable to carry his Labour party on the issue, he was asked by the King to lead a National coalition government with the Liberals and Conservatives.

The formation of the new National Government was quickly followed by a general election, with many candidates putting themselves forward as coalition ("National") candidates. The National ticket won the day, and MacDonald achieved the largest ever mandate for a government in parliamentary history. Unfortunately for him, the vast majority of former Labour members of parliament deserted him (and lost their seats), and only a handful of his former party (including Bennett and Snowden) followed him on the National Labour ticket. Under the coalition sharing of jobs, Snowden retained the position of Chancellor of Exchequer, and Bennett was rewarded (in 1932) with a junior ministerial position (Assistant Postmaster-General). Bennett was bestowed with a knighthood for political services in 1930. Bennett initially served on the Indian Franchise Committee (1931–32) under the Chairmanship of Lord Lothian, which was charged with examining the case for strengthening women's suffrage in India. Although the committee's findings fell short of recommending full adult franchise (because of the country's size, large population and high rate of adult (and especially female) illiteracy), it did recommend that ways be found to increase the ratio of female to male voters from the prevailing 1:20 to 1:5. When MacDonald agreed to tariff increases in 1932, Snowden (who believed in free trade) resigned. Macdonald's increasing political isolation sapped his morale, and his health began to deteriorate. In 1935 he resigned in favour of Stanley Baldwin as leader of the National government. Baldwin led the National government to victory again at the 1935 general election. Bennett retained his seat for National Labour, but with a Conservative now in command Bennett lost out in the subsequent ministerial reshuffle and returned to the back benches. He retired from the House of Commons in 1945.

Despite the growing European tensions of the 1930s, Bennett remained sympathetic to German grievances originating from the Versailles Treaty. Having visited Germany during the economic chaos of the Weimar Republic, Bennett admired the way in which the new Nazi government had rebuilt the country's economy and restored its confidence—in sharp contrast to the apparent malaise afflicting the UK in the early 1930s. Bennett believed that Germany had lost too much territory under the Versailles Treaty, and that its efforts to annex lands where the majority of the population was ethnically German were reasonable. Bennett was not, however, an admirer of Fascism per se, or of unjustified territorial acquisition. He objected to the Italian invasion of Abyssinia, and supported the sanctions imposed on Italy by the League of Nations in 1935. He was a member of the Anglo-German Fellowship, a society committed to furthering understanding between the two countries. This organisation can be seen as an instrument of Anglo-German appeasement, which effectively it was. The appeasement of Germany is now viewed by the majority of historians as having been a mistake but to some English people, including Bennett, who had lived through the First World War and were keen to avoid another seemingly pointless European bloodbath, it offered (at the time) hope for peace. Bennett was much more suspicious of the Soviet Union, which he considered to be no less oppressive, territorially aggressive, and equally willing to persecute religious groups (e.g., the Orthodox Christian Church).

In 1940, as the Second World War unfolded and France fell, Archibald Ramsay (a Scottish Unionist MP) was interned under Defence Regulation 18b as a security risk and potential traitor. Ramsay was a man who professed extreme right wing opinions, was pro-German and also avowedly anti-Semitic. In 1941, it was revealed that he had compiled a book (the "Red Book") of members of his "Right Club", which as the name suggests included people who he deemed to hold the "right" views and to be "right" wing. Despite pressure to reveal the names to the House of Commons, the then Home Secretary (Herbert Morrison) refused to do so, on the grounds that it was impossible to know if all the 235 names in the book were really members. The list of names was not made public until 1989. Bennett's name was among them. Although it is possible that his name was included by Ramsay without his permission (to encourage others), it seems more probable that Bennett was indeed a member.

Without a written constitution or rule book, and without ready access to the list of members (which was secret), new recruits to the Right Club could not have been entirely sure of all the political positions with which they were being aligned, other than what Ramsay told them at the point of recruitment. In the case of Bennett, Ramsay is likely to have sold membership based on the Club's pro-German, pro-peace, and anti-Bolshevik line, which would have been broadly consistent with Bennett's views. However, historians of the Red Book generally concede that the anti-Semitic philosophy associated with the Right Club (via Ramsay's opinions) would have been at odds with Bennett's own expressed position. Bennett made clear on numerous occasions that he was against the persecution of the Jews by the Nazi government, stating (for example) in 1936 that he "frankly deplore[d] Germany's harsh treatment of her Jewish subjects", and again in 1939, that he "could not accept" German explanations "of Jewish arrogance, their mutual control of the legal and medical professions, and so on ... as any real justification for wholesale methods of persecution". Bennet was not in favour of a separate Jewish state in Palestine, which he feared would lead to conflict with the Arabs and the enmity of the Muslim world, but he was nevertheless willing to accept a significant and expanded (but not politically dominant) Jewish presence in Palestine.

== Natural and supernatural interests ==
Bennett's intellectual curiosity extended beyond traditional academic boundaries. In the winter of 1896/7, he explored the island of Socotra with the archaeologist and explorer Theodore Bent (who was accompanied by his co-explorer wife Mabel). Bennett closely observed the wildlife on the island and collected a range of insects and spiders which he donated to the Hope Museum, Oxford. This collection was described and analysed in a published article the following year. Bennett was credited with the discovery of a number of new species and sub-species, some of which were named after him. Bennett wrote about his experiences more generally, as did Bent (though his work was published posthumously).

Bennett's other more unconventional interest was in ghosts. He was a member of the Council of the Society for Psychical Research, and spent much time investigating haunted houses. While he undoubtedly hoped for positive findings, his rigorous and systematic scientific approach left him empty handed in the end. He wrote extensively on the subject, and was regularly interviewed by the BBC.

== Marriage and children ==
Bennett married Marguerite Kleinwort, eldest daughter (of five) of Herman Greverus Kleinwort, and granddaughter of Alexander Friedrich Kleinwort, who founded the eponymous bank. The marriage took place in October 1915 and linked Bennett to Kleinwort's German cousins, as well as to the relatives of his new German mother-in-law (née Marguerite Gunther). Bennett was comparatively old (within two months of his fiftieth birthday) for a first marriage, and his wife, though fifteen years younger, was also not in her first youth. Nevertheless, the couple produced three healthy children, Francis (1916–2005), Frederic (1918–2002), and Marguerite (1922–2012). Both Francis and Frederic served in the British Army's Royal Artillery in the Second World War, reaching the rank of captain and major respectively. Francis Bennett subsequently engaged in local politics in London, obtained a CBE in 1963, and was deputy chairman of the Greater London Council in 1975-6. Frederic Bennett also entered politics, and was a Conservative Member of Parliament from 1951 until his retirement in 1987. He was knighted in 1964.

Sir Ernest Bennett died in February 1947 aged 81, less than two weeks before the marriage of his eldest son to the Hon. Ruth Gordon Catto, daughter of Thomas Sivewright Catto, Governor of the Bank of England. He is buried in Wolvercote Cemetery, Oxford.

== Works ==
- Christianity and Paganism in the Fourth and Fifth Centuries, Rivingtons, London, 1900
- The downfall of the dervishes: being a sketch of the final Sudan campaign of 1898, London: Methuen, 1898
- With Methuen's Column on an Ambulance Train, Swan Sonnenshein, London, 1900
- With the Turks in Tripoli; being some experiences in the Turco-Italian war of 1911, London: Methuen, 1912
- Problems of village life, London: Williams and Norgate, 1914
- (tr.) The German army in Belgium, the white book of May 1915, London: Swarthmore Press, 1921.
- Apparitions and haunted houses; a survey of evidence, London: Faber and Faber, 1939
- Apollonius; or, The present and future of psychical research, London: Kegan Paul, [n.d.]. In the series Today and Tomorrow.

== Notes and references ==
Parliament of the United Kingdom
Preceded by George Herbert Morrell	Member of Parliament for Woodstock; 1906–1910	Succeeded by Alfred Hamersley
Preceded by Lewis Lougher	Member of Parliament for Cardiff Central; 1929–1945	Succeeded by George Thomas
