= Bram Gay =

British musician (1930–2019)

Bramwell Clifford Gay (19 September 1930 – 13 December 2019) was a British trumpet and cornet player and brass band enthusiast.

Gay was born in Treorchy, Glamorgan, Wales. He joined Foden's Band at the age of 13. Gay was published extensively by Novello Music Publishing Ltd. He died at his home in France on 13 December 2019, at the age of 89.

Gay played as third trumpet for four years for Royal Opera House in Covent Garden, where he was offered the position of orchestra director (1974 to 1995). Among the people he worked with were Colin Davis, Georg Solti, and Bernard Haitink.

He played at King George VI's funeral and in Elizabeth II's coronation. He also assembled the orchestra for Charles and Diana's wedding.
