= Lewis Lougher =

Welsh businessman and politician (1871–1955)

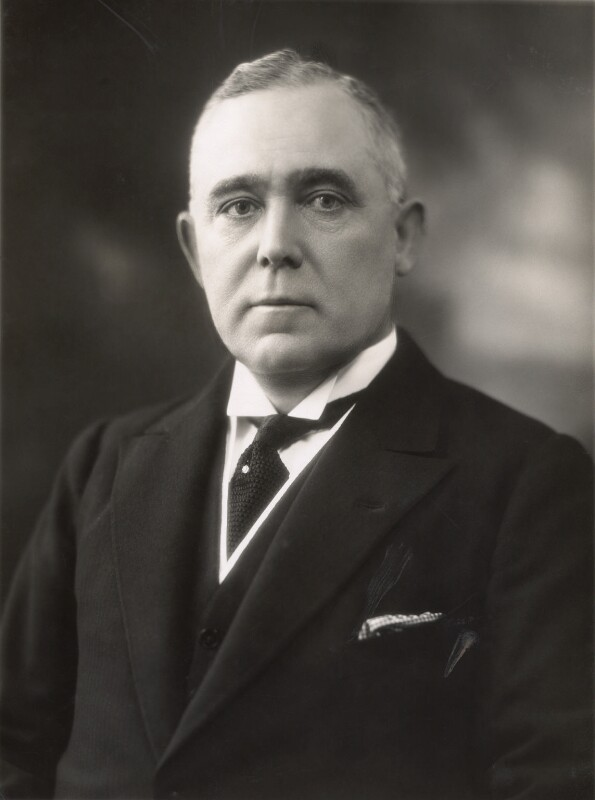
Lougher in 1923

Sir Lewis Lougher, JP (1 October 1871 – 28 August 1955) was a Welsh businessman and politician.

He was the second son of Thomas Lougher of Llandaff, and Charlotte née Lewis, daughter of a farmer from Radyr. Following education at Cardiff Secondary School and Cardiff Technical College he was apprenticed to corn merchants. However he quickly established himself in the shipping business at a time when Cardiff Docks were developing as the largest coal-exporting port in the world.

In 1910, at the age of 29, he established his own shipping company, Lewis Lougher & Co. He went on to become became chairman of several shipping companies in Cardiff, Penarth and Barry. He was also chairman of the Federation of Bristol Channel Shipowners and of the Cardiff Chamber of Trade. He also became a developer of housing, and a director of Whitehouse Precast Concrete Limited, and Danybryn Estates Limited. He was also a director of Ben Evans & Co. Ltd, a Swansea department store.

A Conservative in politics, at the 1922 general election he was elected as Member of Parliament for Cardiff East: he lost the seat when another general election was held in 1923. He returned to parliament at the election in 1924, when he moved to the neighbouring seat of Cardiff Central, holding it until 1929. While in the Commons he successfully introduced a private member's bill that was enacted as the Road Transport Lighting Act 1927.

He was a member of Glamorgan County Council from 1922 to 1949, and also of Cardiff Rural District Council, holding the chairmanship of the latter body for many years. He was a justice of the peace for Glamorgan, was knighted "for political services" in 1929 and in 1931 was High Sheriff of the county.

Lougher never married. He died in 1955 aged 83 in the home he shared with his sister in Radyr.

Parliament of the United Kingdom
Preceded by William Seager	Member of Parliament for Cardiff East; 1922 – 1923	Succeeded by Sir Henry Webb
Preceded by James Childs Gould	Member of Parliament for Cardiff Central; 1924 – 1929	Succeeded by Ernest Bennett
