= Gomer Gunn =

Welsh rugby league footballer

Personal information
- Full name: Gomer Llewellyn Gunn
- Born: c. 1885 Treherbert, Wales
- Died: 4 November 1935 (aged 50) Bradford, England

Playing information

Rugby union
Club
Years	Team	Pld	T	G	FG	P
–1903	Treherbert RFC

Rugby league
- Position: Fullback, Centre
Club
Years	Team	Pld	T	G	FG	P
1903–08	Bradford F.C.	178	1	41	0	85
1908–09	Wigan	10	2	5	0	16
1909	Keighley
	Total	188	3	46	0	101
Representative
Years	Team	Pld	T	G	FG	P
1905–06	Other Nationalities	2	0	1	0	2

Gomer Llewellyn Gunn (c. 1885 – 4 November 1935) was a Welsh rugby union, and professional rugby league footballer who played in the 1900s. He played representative level rugby union (RU) for Welsh Schoolboys, and at club level for Treherbert RFC, and representative level rugby league (RL) for Other Nationalities, and at club level for Bradford FC (now Bradford Park Avenue A.F.C.), Wigan and Keighley, as a fullback or centre.

== Background ==
Gomer Gunn's birth was registered in Treherbert, Wales. He died at his home in Ravenscliffe, Bradford in November 1935, aged 50.

== Playing career ==
=== Bradford ===
Gomer Gunn was a non-playing interchange/substitute to travel in Bradford FC's 5-0 victory over Salford in the Championship tiebreaker during the 1903–04 season at Thrum Hall, Hanson Lane, Halifax on Thursday 28 April 1904, in front of a crowd of 12,000. Gomer Gunn played fullback in Bradford F.C.'s 5-0 victory over Salford in the 1906 Challenge Cup Final during the 1905–06 season at Headingley, Leeds, on Saturday 28 April 1906, in front of a crowd of 15,834.

=== Wigan ===
Gomer Gunn played left-centre and scored a try in Wigan's 18-2 victory over Batley in the Championship semi-final during the 1908–09 season at Central Park, Wigan on Saturday 17 April 1909, but he did not play in the 7-3 victory over Oldham in the final during the 1908–09 season at The Willows, Salford on Saturday 1 May 1909, with Lance Todd taking his place in the team.

Gomer Gunn played left-centre in Wigan's 16-8 victory over Australia in the tour match at Central Park, Wigan on Wednesday 20 January 1909.

=== International honours ===
Gomer Gunn won a cap for Other Nationalities (RL) while at Bradford F.C., he scored a goal in the 11-26 defeat by England at Park Avenue, Bradford on Monday 2 January 1905.

== Personal life ==
Gomer Gunn's daughter, Dolly Gunn, was a film actress.
