= Lou Rees =

Wales dual-code international rugby footballer

Personal information
- Full name: Lewis Ioan Rees
- Born: 7 January 1910; Treherbert, Wales
- Died: 21 December 1976 (aged 66); Manchester, England

Playing information

Rugby union
- Position: Flanker
Club
Years	Team	Pld	T	G	FG	P
	Treorchy RFC
	Cardiff RFC
	Total	0	0	0	0	0
Representative
Years	Team	Pld	T	G	FG	P
1933	Wales	1	0	0	0	0

Rugby league
- Position: Prop
Club
Years	Team	Pld	T	G	FG	P
1934–39	Oldham	125	21	7	0	77
1944–45	Oldham
	Total	125	21	7	0	77
Representative
Years	Team	Pld	T	G	FG	P
1935–38	Wales	5

Lewis Morgan Rees (7 January 1910 – 21 December 1976) was a Welsh dual-code international rugby union, and professional rugby league footballer who played in the 1930s and 1940s. He played representative level rugby union (RU) for Wales, and at club level for Treorchy RFC and Cardiff RFC, as a flanker, and representative level rugby league (RL) for Wales, and at club level for Oldham (both pre- and post-World War II), as a prop.

== Background ==
Rees was born in Treherbert, Wales, and he died aged 66 in Manchester.

== International honours ==
Lou Rees won a cap for Wales (RU) while at Cardiff on Saturday 11 March 1933 against Ireland, and won 5 caps for Wales (RL) in 1935–1938 while at Oldham.
