= Gus Broughton =

- Born: Augustus Stephen Broughton; 29 April 1904 Llandough, Wales
- Died: 22 September 1981 (aged 77) Llwynypia, Wales
- Occupation: police officer

Rugby union career
- Position: Number 8
Amateur team(s)
Years	Team	Apps	(Points)
- Treherbert RFC
–	Treorchy RFC		
–	Penarth RFC		
–	Glamorgan Police RFC		
–	British Police		
International career
Years	Team	Apps	(Points)
1927–1929	Wales	2	(0)

Augustus Stephen Broughton (29 April 1904 – 22 September 1981) was a Welsh rugby union number 8 who played club rugby for Treorchy and Penarth and was capped twice for Wales.

== International matches played ==
Wales

- (Australia) New South Wales Waratahs 1927
- Scotland 1929

== Bibliography ==
- Goodwin, Terry (1984). The International Rugby Championship 1883-1983. London: Willows Books. ISBN 0-00-218060-X.
- Smith, David; Williams, Gareth (1980). Fields of Praise: The Official History of The Welsh Rugby Union. Cardiff: University of Wales Press. ISBN 0-7083-0766-3.
- Thomas, Watcyn (1977). Rugby-Playing Man. London: Pelham Books. ISBN 0-7207-0952-0.
