= David Harris (rugby) =

Welsh rugby footballer

David Thomas Harris
- Dai Harris' Other Nationalities 1904 Rugby League Cap

Personal information
- Full name: David Thomas Harris
- Born: 15 February 1879 Morriston, Wales
- Died: 1958 (aged 79) Aberavon, Wales

Playing information

Rugby union
- Position: Centre
Club
Years	Team	Pld	T	G	FG	P
≤1903–03	Treherbert RFC

Rugby league
- Position: Centre
Club
Years	Team	Pld	T	G	FG	P
1903–05	Wigan	43	6	1		20
Representative
Years	Team	Pld	T	G	FG	P
1904	Other Nationalities	1	1			3

David "Dai" Thomas Harris (15 February 1879 – 1958) was a Welsh rugby union, and professional rugby league footballer who played in the 1900s. He played club level rugby union (RU) for Treherbert RFC, as a centre, and representative level rugby league (RL) for Other Nationalities, and at club level for Wigan, as a centre.

== Background ==
Dai Harris was born in Morriston, Wales, he was a blacksmith's assistant. He died in 1958, aged 79, in Aberavon, Wales.

== Playing career ==
=== International honours ===
Dai Harris won a cap, playing at centre and scored the third try, for Other Nationalities in the 9–3 victory over England at Central Park, Wigan on Tuesday 5 April 1904, in the first ever international rugby league match.

=== Club career ===
During Dai Harris' time at Wigan, they won the South West Lancashire League in 1904–05.
