= Cardiff Central (1918–1950 UK Parliament constituency) =

UK Parliament constituency (1918–1950)

Coordinates: 51.486°N 3.189°W

- Former borough constituency for the House of Commons

1918–1950
- Seats: one
- Created from: Cardiff
- Replaced by: Cardiff North and Cardiff West

Cardiff Central was a borough constituency (Note: A borough constituency (for the purposes of election expenses and type of returning officer)) in the city of Cardiff. It returned one Member of Parliament (MP) to the House of Commons of the Parliament of the United Kingdom, elected by the first past the post system.

A similarly named Cardiff Central constituency, covering a different area of Cardiff, was created in 1983.

== Boundaries ==
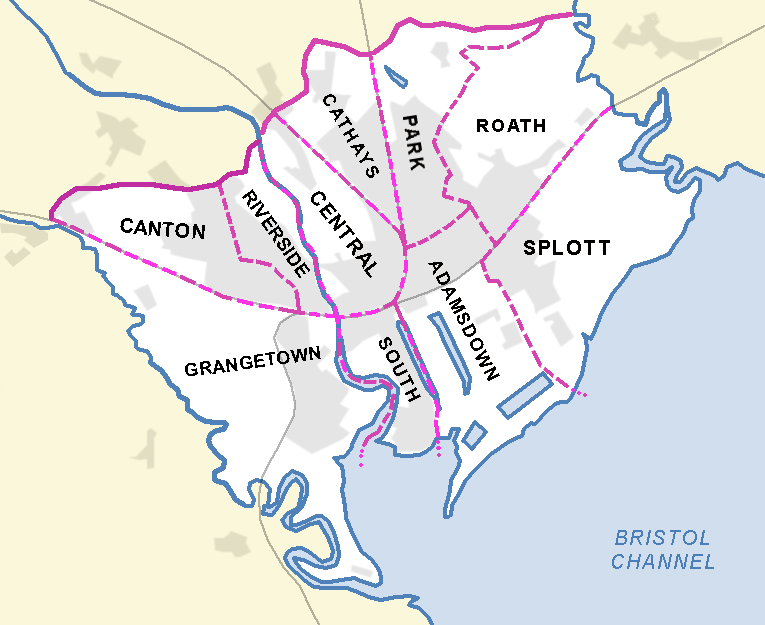
Wards of Cardiff, 1890

1918–1950: The County Borough of Cardiff wards of Canton, Cathays, Central, and Riverside.

The constituency spanned either side of the River Taff. It was abolished in 1950, with Cathays and Central becoming part of the new Cardiff North division, while Canton and Riverside became part of the new Cardiff West division.

== Members of Parliament ==
=== MPs 1918–1950 ===
| Election | Member | Party |
|---|---|---|
| 1918 | James Childs Gould | Unionist |
| 1924 | Lewis Lougher | Unionist |
| 1929 | Ernest Bennett | Labour |
| 1931 | Ernest Bennett | National Labour |
| 1945 | George Thomas | Labour |
| 1950 | constituency abolished | |

== Elections ==
=== Elections 1918–1945 ===
==== Elections in the 1910s ====
General election 1918: Cardiff Central
| Party | Candidate | Votes | % | ±% |
|---|---|---|---|---|
| Unionist | James Childs Gould* | 8,542 | 41.1 | N/A |
| Labour | James Edmunds | 4,663 | 22.4 | N/A |
| Liberal | George Frederick Forsdike | 4,172 | 20.1 | N/A |
| Ind. Unionist | Robert Hughes | 3,419 | 16.4 | N/A |
| Majority | | 3,879 | 18.7 | N/A |
| Turnout | | 20,839 (Note: "42 bad papers and one paper unaccounted for") | 57.0 | N/A |
| Registered electors | | 36,557 | | |
| Unionist win (new seat) | | | | |

- coupon issued but withdrawn.

The Unionist vote was split and, though Robert Hughes managed to save his £150 deposit, he did not turn up to hear the results.

==== Elections in the 1920s ====
General election 1922: Cardiff Central
| Party | Candidate | Votes | % | ±% |
|---|---|---|---|---|
| Unionist | James Childs Gould | 13,885 | 50.0 | +8.9 |
| Labour | James Edmunds | 8,169 | 29.4 | +7.0 |
| Liberal | Charles Fletcher Sanders | 5,732 | 20.6 | +0.5 |
| Majority | | 5,716 | 20.6 | +1.9 |
| Turnout | | 27,786 | 74.4 | +17.5 |
| Registered electors | | 37,326 | | |
| Unionist hold | | Swing | +1.0 | |

General election 1923: Cardiff Central
| Party | Candidate | Votes | % | ±% |
|---|---|---|---|---|
| Unionist | James Childs Gould | 10,261 | 38.4 | −11.6 |
| Labour | James Edmunds | 8,563 | 32.0 | +2.6 |
| Liberal | Ieuan Watkins Evans | 7,923 | 29.6 | +9.0 |
| Majority | | 1,698 | 6.4 | −14.2 |
| Turnout | | 26,747 | 71.4 | −3.0 |
| Registered electors | | 37,444 | | |
| Unionist hold | | Swing | -7.1 | |

General election 1924: Cardiff Central
| Party | Candidate | Votes | % | ±% |
|---|---|---|---|---|
| Unionist | Lewis Lougher | 14,537 | 49.7 | +11.3 |
| Labour | David Pole | 9,864 | 33.8 | +1.8 |
| Liberal | Aneurin Edwards | 4,805 | 16.5 | −13.1 |
| Majority | | 4,673 | 15.9 | +9.5 |
| Turnout | | 29,206 | 76.8 | +5.4 |
| Registered electors | | 38,026 | | |
| Unionist hold | | Swing | +4.8 | |

General election 1929: Cardiff Central
| Party | Candidate | Votes | % | ±% |
|---|---|---|---|---|
| Labour | Ernest Bennett | 14,469 | 39.1 | +5.3 |
| Unionist | Lewis Lougher | 12,903 | 34.9 | −14.8 |
| Liberal | Barnett Janner | 9,623 | 26.0 | +9.5 |
| Majority | | 1,566 | 4.2 | N/A |
| Turnout | | 36,995 | 78.2 | +1.4 |
| Registered electors | | 47,282 | | |
| Labour gain from Unionist | | Swing | +10.1 | |

==== Elections in the 1930s ====
General election 1931: Cardiff Central
| Party | Candidate | Votes | % | ±% |
|---|---|---|---|---|
| National Labour | Ernest Bennett | 24,120 | 69.2 | N/A |
| Labour | Edward Archbold | 10,758 | 30.8 | −8.3 |
| Majority | | 13,362 | 38.4 | N/A |
| Turnout | | 34,878 | 72.6 | −5.6 |
| Registered electors | | 48,065 | | |
| National Labour gain from Labour | | Swing | | |

General election 1935: Cardiff Central
| Party | Candidate | Votes | % | ±% |
|---|---|---|---|---|
| National Labour | Ernest Bennett | 16,954 | 51.5 | −17.7 |
| Labour | John Dugdale | 12,094 | 36.8 | +6.0 |
| Liberal | William Glanville Brown | 3,863 | 11.7 | N/A |
| Majority | | 4,860 | 14.7 | −23.7 |
| Turnout | | 32,911 | 68.7 | −3.9 |
| Registered electors | | 47,912 | | |
| National Labour hold | | Swing | | |

==== Elections in the 1940s ====
General election 1939–40: another general election was required to take place before the end of 1940. The political parties had been making preparations for an election to take place from 1939 and by the end of this year, the following candidates had been selected;

- National Labour: Ronald Wingate
- Labour: John Ramage

General election 1945: Cardiff Central
| Party | Candidate | Votes | % | ±% |
|---|---|---|---|---|
| Labour | T. George Thomas | 16,506 | 49.1 | +12.3 |
| Conservative | Charles Stuart Hallinan | 11,982 | 35.7 | N/A |
| Liberal | Peter Hopkin Morgan | 5,121 | 15.2 | +3.5 |
| Majority | | 4,524 | 13.4 | N/A |
| Turnout | | 33,609 | 72.3 | +3.6 |
| Registered electors | | 46,505 | | |
| Labour gain from National Labour | | Swing | | |

== See also ==
- List of parliamentary constituencies in Wales
