= Treherbert RFC =

Welsh rugby union club, based in Tynewydd

(Wales) Treherbert RFC
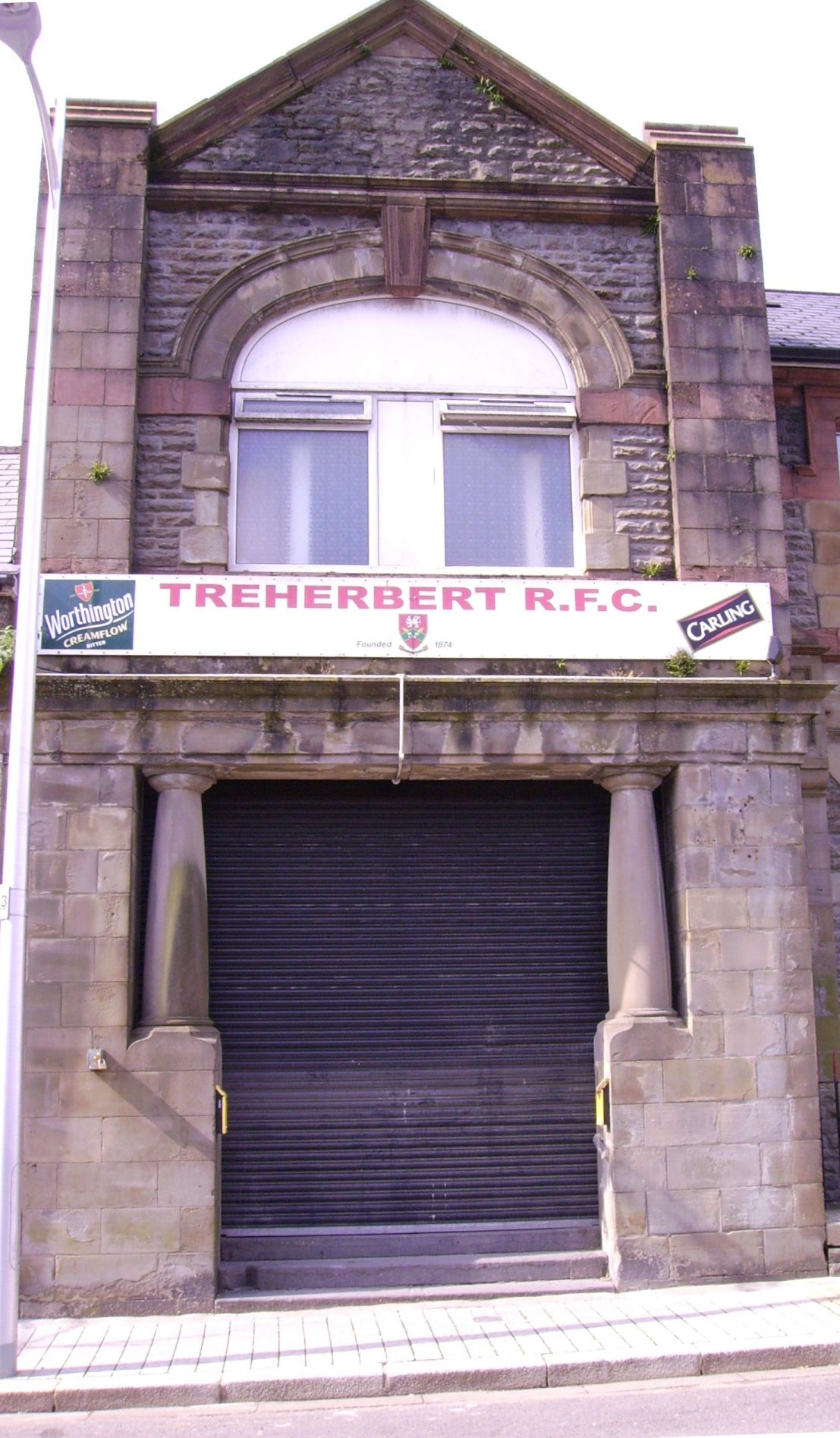
- Full name: Treherbert Rugby Football Club
- Nickname: The Devils
- Founded: 1879
- Location: Tynewydd, Wales
- Ground: Tynewydd R.M. Park (Capacity: 1000)
- Chairman: Neil Skym
- Coach: Liam Emmanuel Rhydian Slade Jones
- League: WRU Division Two East
- 2015-16: Division 3 South Central Champions 2014- 2015]
Team kit

Official website
- www.treherbertrugby.com

Treherbert Rugby Football Club is a Welsh rugby union team based in Tynewydd in the Rhondda Valley. Treherbert RFC play home games in red shirts with black shorts and black socks. Today, Treherbert RFC plays in the Welsh Rugby Union Division Four South East league and are a feeder club for Cardiff Blues.

== Early history ==
In 1875, the newly established coal mines of Treherbert brought workers from Aberdare and Merthyr and with them the game of rugby; and that year saw their first recorded rugby game between a team of players from Treherbert and a team from Merthyr who already had a well established "town" side. On 18 January 1879 a team from Treherbert travelled to Cardiff to play the city team. By 1884 Treherbert had established regular fixtures with the Cardiff Second XV, Merthyr, Aberdare and Pontypridd.

The club's first major success came in 1889-90 by means of the Glamorgan League Championship, a title they were to win on another five occasions. In 1895 Treherbert RFC applied for and were successful in achieving WRU affiliation.

Early in the 1920s another club was formed in the neighbourhood, Blaenrhondda. They played on a field belonging to a local farmer and under the guidance of Mr. T. L. Mort, the local Colliery Agent, the Hay Field was transformed into a rugby pitch. However, after struggling during a difficult period in the early 1920s the team was close to disbanding. Around this time the private company that owned the Treherbert R.F.C.'s field sold the Hay Field to Great Western Railway and the Treherbert Club found themselves without a home. With Treherbert homeless and Blaenrhondda struggling to survive, the future appeared rather dim. In 1929 Treherbert RFC disbanded due to financial troubles and the remains of the team moved the mile up the valley to Blaenrhondda to merge with the smaller club. The merged teams of Treherbert and Blaenrhondda (until 1954 known as Blaenrhondda when the Club changed back to Treherbert R.F.C.) now playing on Blaenrhondda Park won the Rhondda and East Glamorgan League in 1935-36 as well as winning the Coleman Cup twice.

== Notable past players ==
See also Category:Treherbert RFC players

- (Wales) Gus Broughton
- (Wales) Stan Davies (1 Cap)
- (Wales) Gomer Gunn
- (Wales) Dai Harris
- (Wales) David 'Tarw' Jones (13 Caps)
- (Wales) Tom Llewellyn
- Lou Reed
