= Miners' institute =

Meeting and educational venue owned by miners

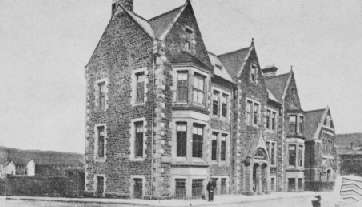
The Parc and Dare Hall Workingman's Club in 1894

Miners' institutes, sometimes known as workingmen's institutes, mine workers' institutes, or miners' welfare halls are large institutional buildings that were typically built during the height of the industrial period as a meeting and educational venue. More commonly found in Britain, miners' institutes were owned by miner groups who gave a proportion of their wage into a communal fund to pay for the construction and running of the building. The institutes would normally contain a library, reading room and meeting room.

== Miners' institutes of North and South Wales ==
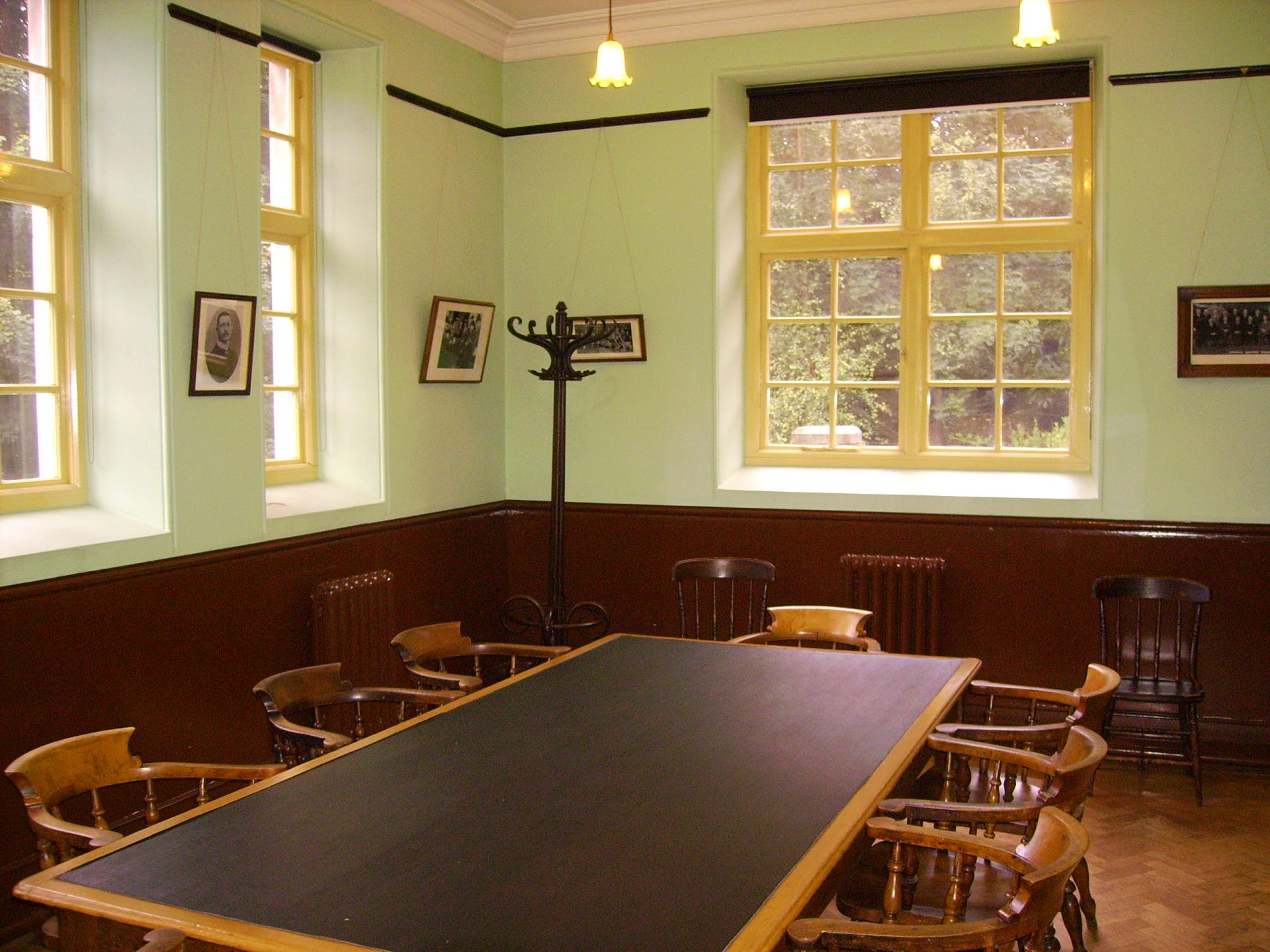
Interior of the Oakdale Institute at St Fagans National History Museum

During the late 19th century, with the population growth seen in former rural communities, many industrialised areas saw workers contributing to funds to build institutes. This was typified in the southern coalfield of Wales, which by 1910 saw institutes built in most towns and villages. The first to be built in Wales was 'The Working Men's Club' on Alexandra Road in Swansea in 1874. The institutes were of socialist and altruistic nature and would include small libraries and reading rooms, whose books would lean towards history and politics, in an attempt to allow the working class man to better himself. Aneurin Bevan attributed his intellectual training to the Tredegar miners' library.

While the library and reading room took care of the intellectual needs of the population the larger institutes often catered for the social side by providing a billiards hall, a refreshment room, and a large hall which could be used for meetings or entertainment. The 'Stute, as it was popularly known, soon became the heart of the community.

The institutes were normally run by committee chosen by the workers, and a nominal fee was required from members to pay for the running costs, though some philanthropic coalowners would financially support the local institute. Following the Royal Commission for Coal in 1919, a Miners' Welfare Fund was established to provide amenities for the miners, such as communal baths, scholarships and welfare halls. This in turn led to the construction of welfare halls in the areas which to this date had no miners' institutes.

By the eve of the Second World War there were more than a hundred miners' institutes, those of note include 'Y Stiwt' in Rhosllannerchrugog, the Oakdale Miners' Institute, the Parc and Dare in the Rhondda and the Abercynon Miners' Institute. Most of the institutes survived into the 1970s but with the decline of coal many of the buildings were left to ruin. Slowly returning prosperity to former mining communities has witnessed a revival of some of the institutes, such as those at Blackwood, Llanhilleth and Newbridge, which have rebranded themselves as entertainment or arts centres.

The South Wales Miners' Library in Swansea keeps many of the collections from the institutes intact, and the Oakdale Institute has been reconstructed at St Fagans National History Museum.

== Miners' institutes in other countries ==
=== England ===
Some miners' welfare clubs in England overlaps with working men's clubs.

- Thurcroft Welfare Hall – Thurcroft, Yorkshire
- Hamstead Miners' Institute – Hamstead, West Midlands
- Garforth Miners' Welfare Hall, Garforth, West Yorkshire
- Ifton Miners Welfare Institute, St Martin's, Shropshire

=== Scotland ===
- Bannockburn Miners' Welfare – Bannockburn, Stirling
- Lochgelly Miners' Institute – Lochgelly, Fife
- Lochore Miners Welfare Institute –

Lochore, Fife

- Loganlea Miners' Welfare – Addiewell, West Lothian
- Fauldhouse Miners' Welfare Society - West Lothian

=== United States ===
- Historic Miners' Institute – Collinsville, Illinois
