= Geraint Williams =

Welsh footballer and manager

Personal information
- Full name: David Geraint Williams
- Date of birth: 5 January 1962 (age 64)
- Place of birth: Cwmparc, Wales
- Height: 5 ft 7 in (1.70 m)
- Position: Midfielder

Youth career
- Treorchy and Cwmparc Boys Club

Senior career*
Years	Team	Apps	(Gls)
1980–1985	Bristol Rovers	141	(8)
1985–1992	Derby County	277	(9)
1992–1998	Ipswich Town	217	(3)
1998–2000	Colchester United	39	(0)
Total		674	(20)

International career
1988–1996	Wales	13	(0)

Managerial career
- 2003: Colchester United (caretaker)
- 2006–2008: Colchester United
- 2009–2010: Leyton Orient
- 2012–2016: Wales U21
- * Club domestic league appearances and goals

David Geraint Williams (born 5 January 1962) is a Welsh football manager and former professional footballer.

As a player, he was a midfielder from 1980 until 2000, notably featuring in the Premier League for Ipswich Town, as well as in the Football League for Bristol Rovers, Derby County, and Colchester United. He was capped 13 times for Wales.

Since retiring he was worked as a coach and later became Colchester United manager between 2006 and 2008 following a successful temporary spell in charge. He later managed both Leyton Orient and the Wales U21 team.

== Club career ==
Williams was born in Cwmparc. He began his career with Bristol Rovers, where he made his first team debut in the 1980–81 season and remained with them until he joined Derby County on 29 March 1985 for £40,000. He had played 141 league games for the Pirates, scoring eight goals.

He helped Derby County win promotion to the Second Division in 1986 and to the First Division a year later, rarely missing a game for them in his seven years there. He contributed to their fifth place league finish (their best in over a decade) in 1989 but endured the disappointment of relegation back to the Second Division two years later. After failing to get them back into the top flight in 1992, he bade farewell to the Baseball Ground after seven years, 267 league games and 10 goals, when signing for Ipswich Town on 1 July 1992 for £650,000. Ipswich had just been promoted to the new FA Premier League as champions of the Second Division.

Ipswich did reasonably well in 1992–93, having the longest unbeaten start in the new Premier League and being fourth as late on as February. However, a run of poor results dragged them down to 16th place in the final table. They only narrowly avoided relegation a year later, as the 1993–94 campaign had brought a similar pattern to the previous one – a good start followed by a slump. Ipswich were finally relegated in 1994–95, winning just seven games and conceding 92 goals (including a 9–0 defeat by Manchester United in March 1995). Williams remained with them for three more seasons after relegation, finally departing on a free transfer in the summer of 1998 after 227 league games and three goals for the Tractor Boys.

He then signed for Division Two newcomers Colchester United, playing 39 league games for them over the next two seasons before finally hanging up his boots at the end of the 1999–2000 season and remaining at the club as a coach.

== International playing career ==
Williams was capped 13 times by Wales.

== Style of Play ==
A combative and hard-working player, he was also capable of getting forward and playing in more advanced positions. He usually played in front of his team's back-line and mainly served as a defensive foil for his more offensive teammates, due to his aggressive tackling, as well as his ability to read the game, break down plays, mark and anticipate opponents, and time his challenges. In this role, he was known for his acceleration, positional sense, tactical discipline, intelligence, energy, and ball-winning ability; although he was not the fastest, most talented or technically skilled player on the ball, or particularly good in the air.

He was also capable of functioning as a deep-lying playmaker for his team, due to his ability to dictate the tempo of his team's play in midfield with his short, efficient passing game, which allowed him to link up the defence with the attack effectively after winning back possession. His physical strength in spite of his small stature, combined with his low centre of gravity, also gave him excellent balance on the ball in limited spaces, which allowed him to retain possession against more physical opponents. In addition to his defensive skills, Williams was also known for his tenacity, awareness, consistency, and strong mentality.

== Coaching and managerial career ==
When he retired from playing he stayed at Colchester United to become assistant manager in 2000. In July 2006, Geraint took charge of the U's, replacing out going manager Phil Parkinson. He had previously managed Colchester on a four-week caretaker basis during the 2002–03 season prior to Parkinson's appointment.

Colchester were among most people's favourites to be relegated from the Football League Championship in the 2006–07 season, as they had the smallest ground in the division – it was also their first season in the second tier of the English league throughout their history. Despite a slow start, they entered a run of consistent good form and were in the challenge for a play-off place right up until the final game of the season. They eventually finished 10th above more favoured sides such as Crystal Palace, Leicester City and most notably the relegated Leeds United.

However, following the club's success many of their most notable players were snapped up elsewhere and, following a summer in which the club needed to rebuild their playing staff, they were unable to sustain their success and were relegated once more the following season, finishing bottom.

With the club's expectations at an all-time high following the two-year stint in the higher division, a poor start to the 2008–09 season, (where the club fell to twenty-third League One) saw Geraint leave his post on 22 September 2008 after discussions with the chairman.

Williams was appointed manager of Leyton Orient in February 2009. He started very well and managed to help Orient to 7 wins from his first 9 games in charge, including wins over teams such as Crewe Alexandra, Brighton & Hove Albion and Carlisle United. He led the relegation-threatened O's to an eventual mid-table finish of 14th place, retaining their League One status with several games to spare. After a poor run of form in March, Williams left Orient only hours after the side's 3–1 home defeat to Hartlepool United.

In May 2012 Brian Flynn vacated his position as manager of the Wales national under-21 football team at the end of his contract and in July 2012 Geraint Williams was appointed as Flynn's successor. During this mandate, he notably suffered a historical defeat in San Marino (1-0), in a qualification match for the 2015 UEFA European Under-21 Championship. On 5 December 2016 Williams resigned as manager of Wales under 21 and under 19 teams.

== Personal life ==
Williams married his wife Lynne on 6 July 1985 at St David's Church, Ton Pentre. They had their first child together Rhys Williams on 5 November 1988, shortly followed by their daughter Bethan Williams on 31 December 1990, both born in Derby. He is a lifelong fan of Cardiff City.

== Managerial stats ==
Team	Nat	From	To	Record				
Team	Nat	From	To	G	W	L	D	Win %
Colchester United	(England)	29 January 2003	25 February 2003	5	2	0	3	40.00
Colchester United	(England)	28 July 2006	22 September 2008	106	30	47	29	28.30
Leyton Orient	(England)	5 February 2009	3 April 2010	62	21	25	16	33.87
Wales U21	(Wales)	9 July 2012	5 December 2016	12	5	4	3	41.70

== Honours ==
=== Club ===
Derby County

- Football League Second Division Winner (1): 1986–87
