= Cwmparc =

Coordinates: 51°39′13″N 3°31′06″W

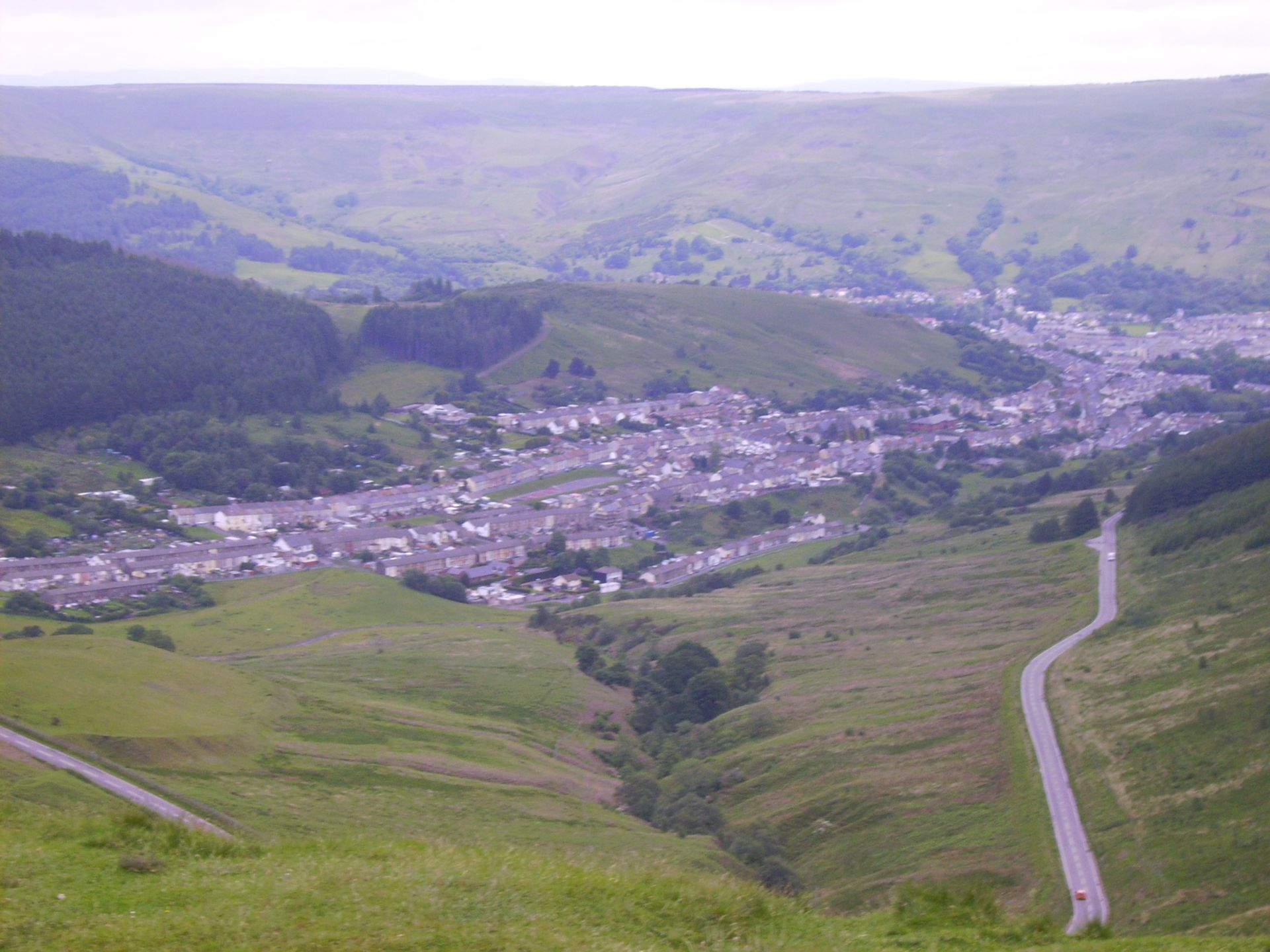
- Cwmparc from Bwlch y Clawdd

- Location within Rhondda Cynon Taf
- OS grid reference: SS956967
- Community: Treorchy
- Principal area: Rhondda Cynon Taf
- Preserved county: Mid Glamorgan
- Country: Wales
- Sovereign state: United Kingdom
- Post town: Treorchy
- Postcode district: CF42
- Dialling code: 01443
- Police: South Wales
- Fire: South Wales
- Ambulance: Welsh
- UK Parliament: Rhondda and Ogmore
- Senedd Cymru – Welsh Parliament: Rhondda

Cwmparc is a village and a district of the community of Treorchy, in the Rhondda Valley, Wales.

== History ==
There is evidence of, and logic for, a medieval park, or hunting preserve, in the enclosed area called Parc Cwm Brychiniog. It lies in the cwmwd (in English 'commote') of Glyn Rhondda, a Welsh lordship centred on a motte and bailey castle at the confluence of the Rhondda Fawr and Nant y Clydach (below the town of Tonypandy) and now known as Ynys y Crug. Little of this structure remains, the motte having been largely destroyed by the building of Taff Vale Railway in the 19th century and the Tonypandy by-pass in the 20th century. The land below Cwmparc was subsequently divided into four farms in Tudor times, one of which was called Parc Uchaf (Upper Park) and another Parc Isaf (Lower Park). The area became known as Cwmparc and its stream Nant Cwmparc ("cwm" being the Welsh for valley). With the development of the coal mining in this part of the South Wales Valleys in the 19th century, the village also became known as Cwmparc. Above the present village is the mountain pass Bwlch y Clawdd leading to the Ogwr and Afan valleys.

Details of the early history and development of Cwmparc are contained within the booklet, "History of Cwmparc. King Coal Invades a Sylvan Valley" by Mr Gwyn Prosser which was awarded the prize at Treorchy Semi-National Eisteddfod in 1923. The author describes Cwmparc in 1923 as "a mining village of considerable pretensions, aspiring almost to the more dignified name of township" with a population of about 5,000. He describes the Parc [colliery] and, further down the valley, the Dare colliery, and the constant processions of [coal]-laden trucks running down the railway that flanked the Parc River.

== Early Cwmparc ==
The pioneer of Cwmparc's development was David Davies of Llandinam described as, "foremost of Welsh industrial kings and founder of the renowned Ocean Coal Company", who had in 1862 negotiated with Crawshay Bailey to commence coal mining on the Tremains Estate. Sinking operations were begun in August 1866 and by the end of that year Parc Pit had produced its first output of coal.

== The building of Tallis Street ==
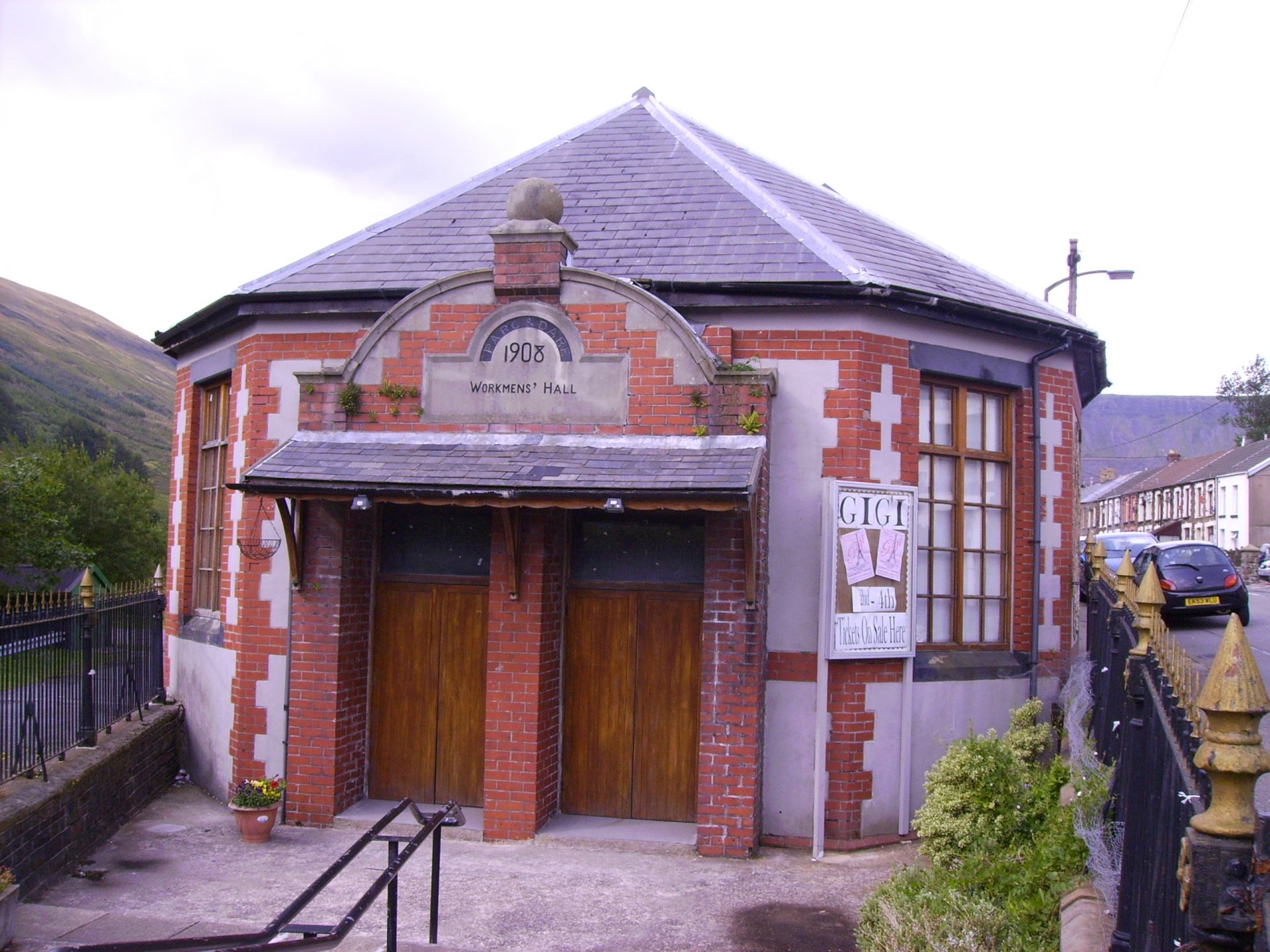
Parc and Dare Workmen's Hall

Gwyn Prosser in History of Cwmparc describes how Railway Terrace was the first of the new streets in Cwmparc to be built near to the railway leading from the pithead. The street was known euphemistically as ‘Tub Row’ because of the habit of the occupants for leaving their tin bath tubs out on the pavements in the evening, ‘thus setting a trap for, and imperilling the life and limbs of unwary strangers on a dark night’. As for the rest of the village he describes how Parc Road, the main street, ‘now more than half a mile long’, contained the more ‘reputable’ buildings, such as the miners' institute, two hotels and three chapels. Prosser details how, with the influx of population, housing in the early days of Cwmparc was a major problem.

In particular he recalls one elderly resident's recollection of how when she came to Cwmparc her family consisting of a mother, father and four children managed to secure accommodation in a shepherd's cottage, Parc Bach. The cottage already accommodated the shepherd, his family and three other lodgers. With such a demand it was not long before builders and property speculators moved into the area, thus in 1867 Cwmdare Street was completed and most of Parc Street the following year. Tallis Street, Barrett Street and Vicarage Terrace were soon to follow erected by a local building club enterprise. Tallis Street was named in honour of A. S. Tallis, manager of Dare Colliery and Barrett Street in honour of a well-respected Scottish doctor in the neighbourhood.

Thirteen years later in 1936 the author provided an additional chapter to update his work. He describes the industrial history of the village as being ‘overhung with gloom’ and the district as being ‘haunted by the spectre of unemployment’. The village's main employer, and indeed reason for being, The Parc and The Dare pits had always worked intermittently and had been ‘unable to absorb all the eager claimants for work’. There had been moments of industrial strife, notably the 1926 general strike and the ‘stay in’ strikes of 1935.

In 1954 the National Coal Board merged the two pits, and finally in 1966 after a hundred years of production the Parc and Dare pit closed for the last time, leaving Cwmparc's ‘sylvan’ valley to revert, in some measure, to its original beauty.

== WWII bombing ==
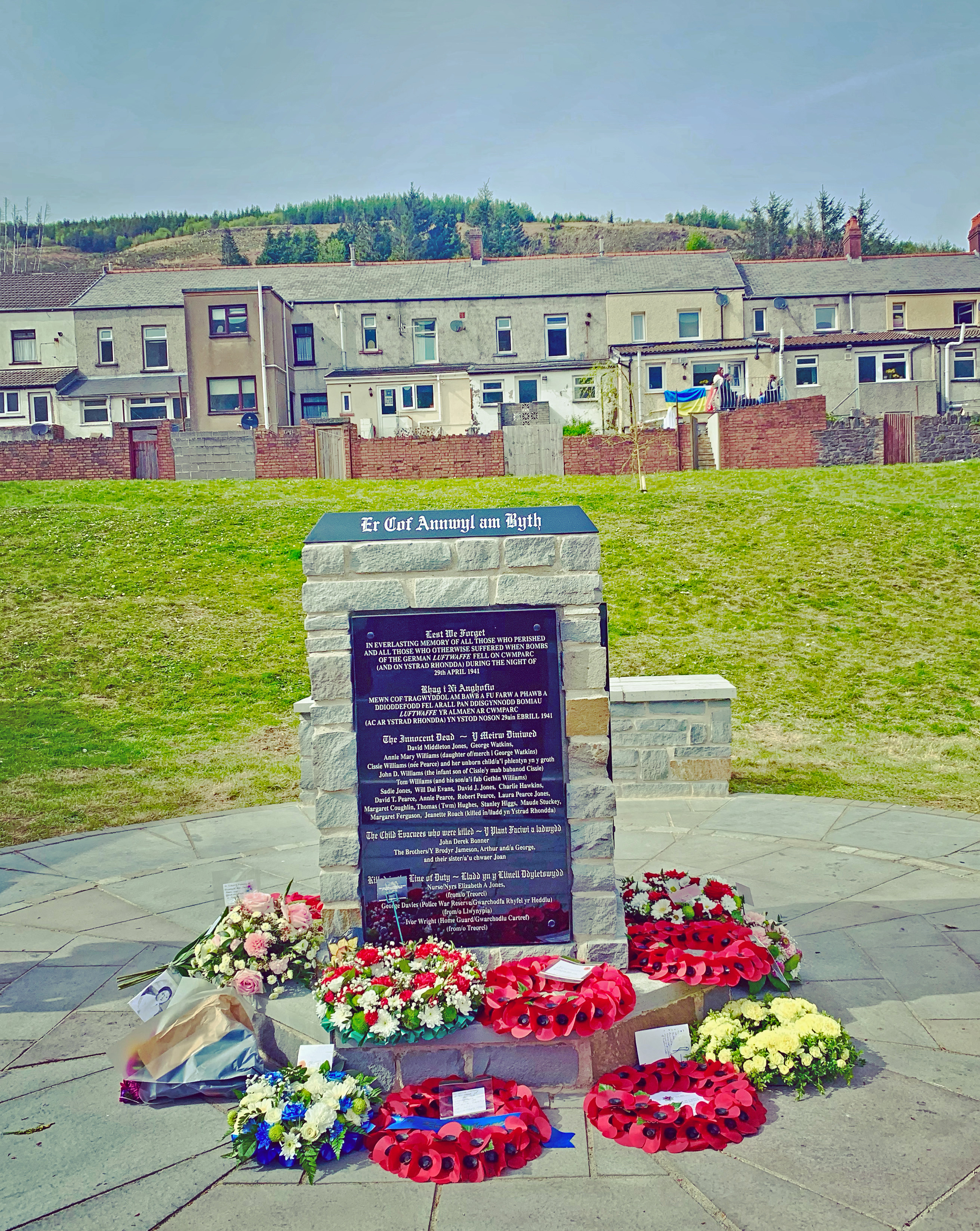
Cwmparc Blitz Memorial

On the night of 29 April 1941, during the Second World War, Cwmparc was bombed by the Luftwaffe. It was part of a diversion attack on Cardiff whilst Plymouth was heavily attacked. There were many casualties with some 28 dead, including a British Cross Nurse, Special Constable, Police War Reserve and 3 members of the Home Guard. 6 children were killed, four of which were evacuees (3 were siblings). 25 of the 28 victims were buried in Treorchy Cemetery. The remaining three victims were buried in Trealaw, Penrhys and St Dogmaels. The event was the largest loss of life that the Rhondda suffered in a single night of wartime bombing.

A Memorial now stands on Parc Road to remember this event. It's located on a grass area known locally as the "bombed houses" (where 10 houses were destroyed - by the after blast of a parachute bomb that exploded above 51/52 Treharne Street - and were never rebuilt). The memorial was created due to the campaigning of the late QC Robert Leighton Davies.

== Notable people from Cwmparc ==
- Richie Burnett - former darts world champion
- Robert Thomas - sculptor
- Rachel Tresize - writer
- Ian "H" Watkins - pop singer
- Geraint Williams - Wales under-21 football manager
