= Treorchy RFC =

Welsh rugby union football club

(Wales) Treorchy RFC
- Full name: Treorchy Rugby Football Club
- Nickname: The Zebras
- Founded: 1886
- Location: Treorchy, Wales
- Ground: The Oval
- Coach(es): Ian Evans (forwards); Andrew Bishop (backs)
- Captain: Nathan Griffiths
- League: WRU championship East
- 2014-15: 4th
Team kit

Official website
- www.treorchyrfc.co.uk

Treorchy Rugby Football Club is a rugby union team from the village of Treorchy, in the Rhondda Valley, Wales. They formed in 1886 and by 1891 were a strong voice in the Welsh Football Union and were playing in the Rhondda Division.

== Club history ==
With the industrialisation of the Rhondda, the game of rugby spread through the valley as the growing population looked for social activities to become involved in. Although not the first club to form in the Rhondda, Treorchy provided the first international player to represent Wales while still playing for a valley club. In the opening game of the 1886 Home Nations Championship, Treorchy provided the first 'Rhondda forward' when Sam Ramsey was selected to face England. Although Ramsey would only win two caps, and the second took a wait of eight years, Treorchy would provide several players throughout their history, including Billy Cleaver who would eventually play for the British Lions In 1907, Treorchy was accused of throwing a rugby game against Aberdare, which gave Aberdare the Glamorgan League title. The resulting enquiry by the WRU saw the permanent suspension of Treorchy's entire committee.

As Treorchy finished in the top four of the WRU premier division during the 1994/95 season they were given the privilege of hosting that year's touring international team Fiji.

== Club honours ==
- 1992/93 WRU Division Three - Champions
- 1993/94 WRU Division Two - Champions
- 2008/09 WRU Division Three South East - Champions
- 2016/17 WRU Division One East Central - Champions

== Notable former players ==
See also Category:Treorchy RFC players

The following players have played for Treorchy and have also been capped at international level.

- (Wales) Andrew Bishop (16 caps)
- (Wales) Morgan Stoddart (8 caps)
- (Wales) Chris Bridges (7 caps)
- (Wales) Gus Broughton (2 caps)
- (Wales) Billy Cleaver (14 caps)
- (Wales) William Cummins (4 caps)
- (Wales) Kevin Ellis
- (Wales) David Wyn Evans
- (Wales) Luc Evans (1 cap)
- (Wales) David Rees James (2 caps)
- (Wales) David Morgan Jenkins (4 caps)
- (Wales) Emlyn Jenkins
- (Wales) Lyn Jones (5 caps)
- (Wales) Percy Jones (8 caps)
- (Wales) Paul Knight (5 caps)
- (Wales) Mark Lewis (1 cap)
- (Wales) S. H. Ramsey (2 caps)
- (Wales) Lewis Rees

== Games played against international opposition ==
Year	Date	Opponent	Result	Score	Tour
1995	1 November	Fiji	Loss	14-70	1995 Fiji tour of Wales
1996	16 October	Narbonne, France	Loss	19-26	
1996	19 October	Castres Olympique, France	Loss	61-17	
1996	26 October	Dinamo Bucharest, Romania	Loss	38-31	
