= Treorchy =

Treorchy: Welsh: Treorci
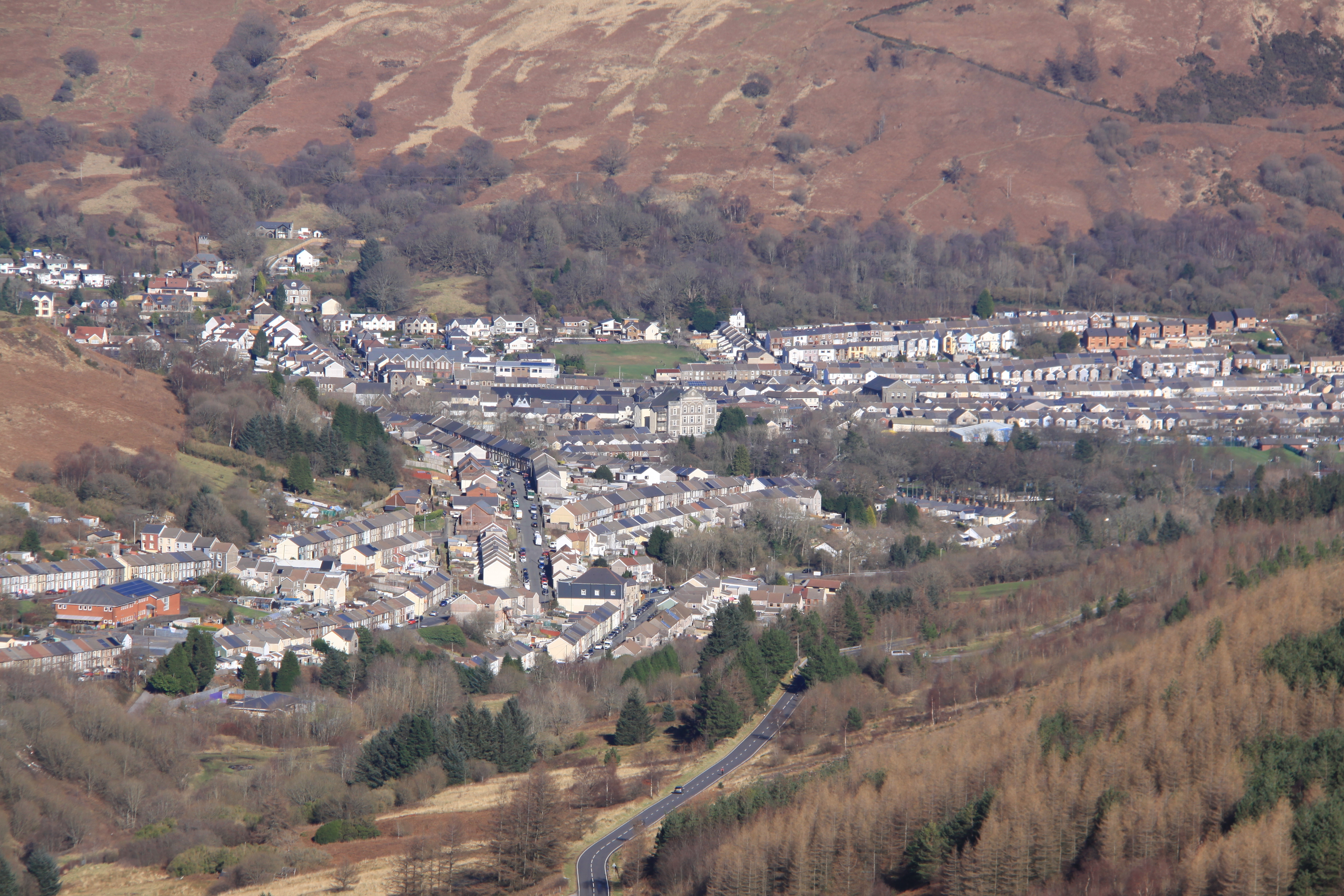

- Location within Rhondda Cynon Taf
- Population: 7,681 (Mid-2017 Estimate)
- OS grid reference: SS955965
- Principal area: Rhondda Cynon Taf
- Preserved county: Mid Glamorgan
- Country: Wales
- Sovereign state: United Kingdom
- Post town: TREORCHY
- Postcode district: CF42
- Dialling code: 01443
- Police: South Wales
- Fire: South Wales
- Ambulance: Welsh
- UK Parliament: Rhondda
- Senedd Cymru – Welsh Parliament: Rhondda
- List of places UK Wales Rhondda Cynon Taf 51.6594°N 3.5055°W Community map: Map of the community

Treorchy (Welsh: Treorci; Welsh pronunciation) is a town and community (and electoral ward) in Wales. Once a mining town, it retains such characteristics. It is situated in the county borough of Rhondda Cynon Taf in the Rhondda Fawr valley. Treorchy is also one of the 16 communities of the Rhondda. It includes the villages of Cwmparc and Ynyswen.

== History ==
Before industrialisation, most of the land was owned by one of the great families of Glamorgan, with Treorchy coming under the domain of the Marquess of Bute Estate. The discovery of coal transformed the area. The period following 1851 saw Treorchy become an industrial town. The town grew around the coal mining industry during the late 19th and early 20th centuries, but by the end of the 20th century all the local pits had closed, creating an economic downturn in the community.

Treorchy was established when the Abergorki Colliery, situated in Cwm Orci to the north, was opened as a level in 1859 by a Mr Huxham, a former manager of the Bute Merthyr Colliery. This was sold to J. H. Insole of Cymmer in 1862. The first deep mine in Treorchy was sunk in the 1860s by David Davies of Llandinam, who would later own the Ocean Coal Company. The initial development of the town was linear, based on the main road through the valley, but by 1875 a grid pattern of streets was emerging.

== Language ==
The pre‑industrial Rhondda community was Welsh‑speaking, and the Welsh language continued to be widely spoken in the valley and in the upper villages of the Rhondda until the mid‑20th century. The original migrants to the Rhondda came from rural Wales, but later a higher proportion arrived from England. In 1901, 64.4% of the population of the Rhondda Urban District was recorded as Welsh‑speaking; however, this proportion had fallen to 56.6% by 1911.

Ysgol Gymraeg Ynyswen, a Welsh‑medium primary school, is situated in the nearby village of Ynyswen. Established in 1950, it was the first Welsh‑medium school in the Rhondda. It serves Treorchy and the surrounding villages, including Treherbert, Cwmparc, Penyrenglyn, and Blaencwm.

== Governance ==
The Treorchy electoral ward is coterminous with the borders of the Treorchy community and elects three county councillors to Rhondda Cynon Taf County Borough Council. Since 1995, representation has been held by either the Labour Party or Plaid Cymru. Since 2008, the ward has had three Plaid Cymru representatives.

A 2018 review of electoral arrangements by the Local Democracy and Boundary Commission for Wales proposed reducing Treorchy's representation from three to two councillors. The proposals were to take effect from the 2022 council elections.

== Economy ==
After being a town whose employment relied almost entirely on coal mining in the Abergorki, Tylecoch, Parc and Dare collieries, by the end of the 1970s all of these collieries had closed. Treorchy became a commuter village, with the working population seeking employment in the larger towns and cities nearby, such as Cardiff and Bridgend. Employment in Treorchy is now mostly in retail.

In 2020, Treorchy was named by the Great British High Street Awards as the UK High Street of the Year, succeeding 2019 winner and fellow Welsh town Crickhowell. It was praised for the number of independent shops in the town, and for organising a number of events, from Christmas parades to arts festivals, as well as a gay pride gathering which was a first for the area. The Guardian reported that the town has grown its chamber of trade from 30 members to 120, and nearly 30 businesses have opened in recent years, producing an occupancy rate of 96%. The town has a number of cafes, pubs, and shops on its high street.

== Religion ==
In its early days as an industrial settlement, Treorchy was considered a nonconformist stronghold, with many chapels, the largest of which was Noddfa – a Welsh Baptist chapel that could seat upwards of a thousand people and that had a proud choral tradition.

== Education ==
Treorchy has two main schools: Treorchy Primary School and Treorchy Comprehensive. The primary school is not on the original site of the Treorchy Boys and Treorchy Girls schools, but is built 100 metres further along Glyncoli Road. It was constructed according to the original plans used for many of the older schools in the upper Rhondda.

Treorchy Comprehensive school was built on the old site of the Tylecoch colliery. Its western athletics track was named the 'Red Ash', being the remnants of the mine shaft. This was removed in 2006 to build an astroturf sports field. The school is officially 500 metres from the main gate to the rear gate, and runs from Chepstow Road, Cwmparc, to Tylecoch Bridge, Treorchy.

== Transport ==
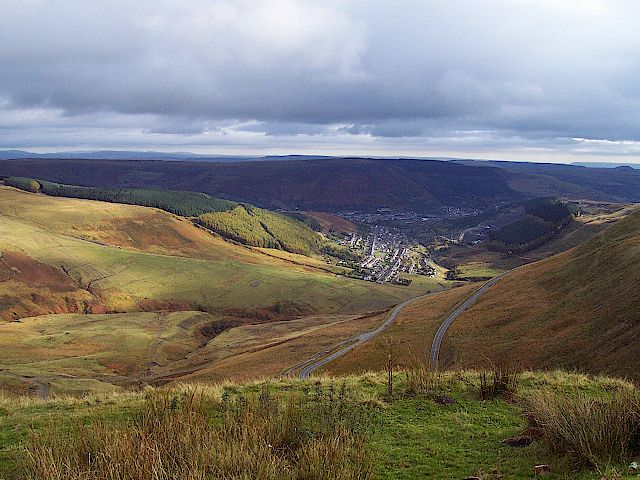
Bwlch‑y‑Clawdd Road and Treorchy

The A4061 over the Bwlch y Clawdd Pass leads to Bridgend (via the Ogmore Vale), as well as to Maesteg and Port Talbot. Within the Rhondda Fawr Valley, the A4061 runs northwards to the top of the valley at Treherbert and, ultimately, Hirwaun. The A4058 southwards follows the valley's course to Llwynypia, Tonypandy, Porth, and Pontypridd, where it joins the A470 to Cardiff.

Treorchy railway station is located on the Rhondda Line, with regular services to Treherbert and Cardiff Central operated by Transport for Wales.

Treorchy is served by buses operated by Stagecoach running to Blaenrhondda, Blaencwm, Treherbert, Tonypandy, Porth, Pontypridd, and Caerphilly. On summer Sundays, Veolia provides a service to Bridgend (via the Ogmore Valley) and to Brecon.

== Culture ==
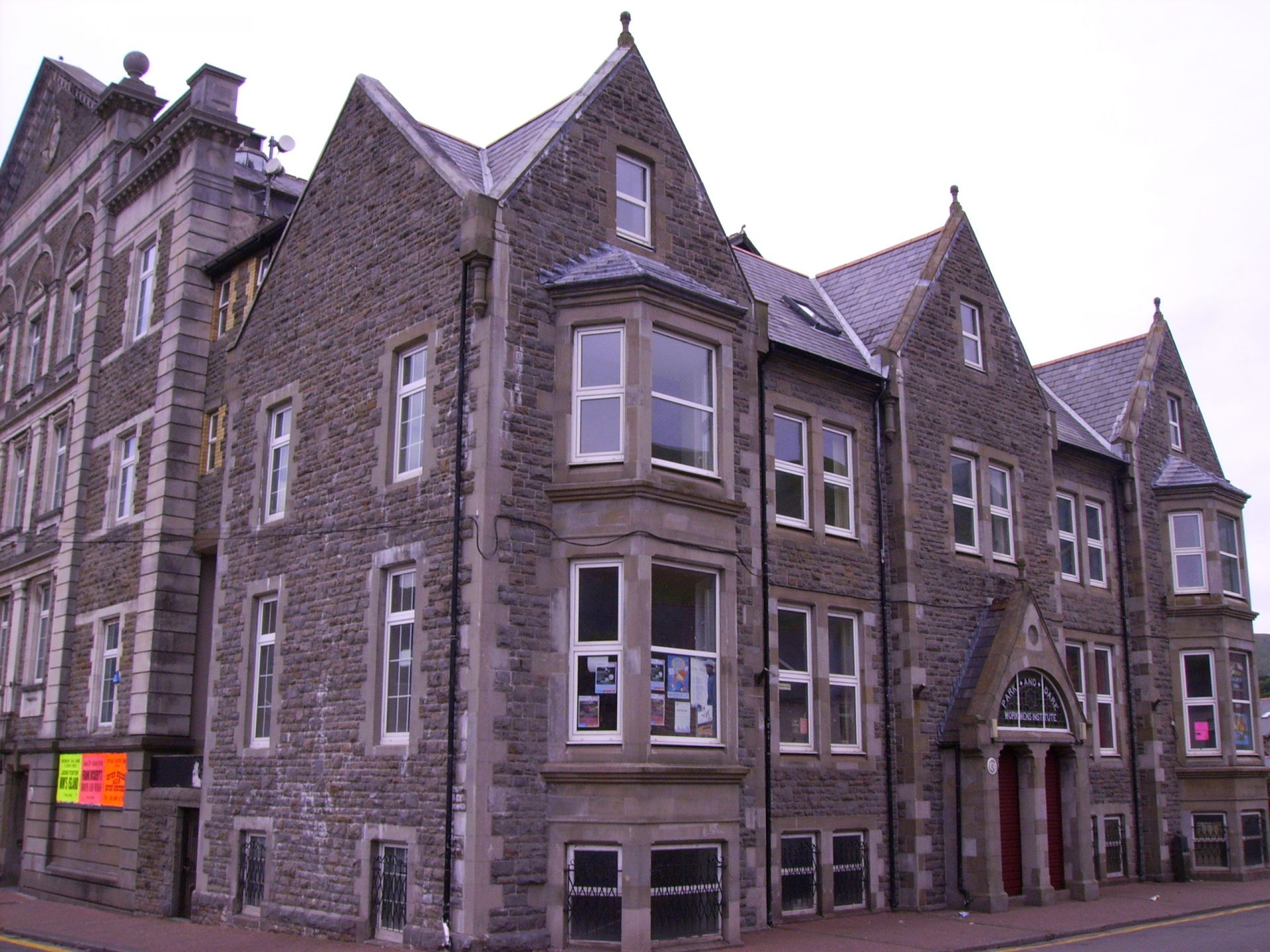
The Parc and Dare Hall

Attractions in the town include the Parc and Dare Hall, home of the Treorchy Male Choir and the Parc and Dare Band. The hall also provides entertainment as a venue for cinema, theatre, and pantomime, as well as for school eisteddfodau and other performances.

Treorchy hosted the National Eisteddfod in 1928, the only time the event has been held in the Rhondda.

== Sport ==
Treorchy RFC is the town's rugby union club, nicknamed 'the Zebras'.

Treorchy also has six tennis courts, situated in Ystradfechan Park, and is the home of the Rhondda Lawn Tennis Club.

Upper Rhondda Cricket Club play on Ystradfechan Fields in Treorchy. The club was founded in 2002 when Blaenrhondda CC and Treorchy CC merged. They also have a women's side, which was the first women's cricket team in the Rhondda when it was established in 2019.

== Notable people ==
See Category:People from Treorchy

- Euros Bowen (1904–1988) – Welsh poet and bard
- Billy Cleaver (1921–2003) – Wales international rugby union player
- Donald Davies (1924–2000) – computer scientist
- John Davies (1938–2015) – Welsh historian
- Bram Gay (1930–2019) – musician and musical director
- Peter George (1924–1966) – author and Oscar‑nominated screenwriter
- Noel Kinsey (1925) – Welsh international footballer
- Wayne Jones (1948) – Welsh international footballer
- Clive Thomas (1936) – World Cup football referee
- Frank Vickery (1951–2018) – playwright
- Geraint Williams (1962) – Welsh international footballer
- Luke Morgan Britton (1990) – music journalist and author
- Tomos Williams (1995) – Wales international and British & Irish Lions rugby union player

== Bibliography ==
- Jones, Dot (1998). Statistical Evidence relating to the Welsh Language 1801–1911. Cardiff: University of Wales Press. ISBN 0708314600.
