= Alcoholic spirits measure =

Instrument to measure alcoholic dispension

Example of an optic style measuring device

An alcoholic spirits measure is an instrument designed to measure exact amounts or shots of alcoholic spirits. One of the benefits of alcoholic spirits measures is that they can help to control and monitor alcohol consumption and estimated blood alcohol content. The most common devices used today to measure spirits are the thimble measure (or jigger) and the non-drip measure (or optic).

== Types ==
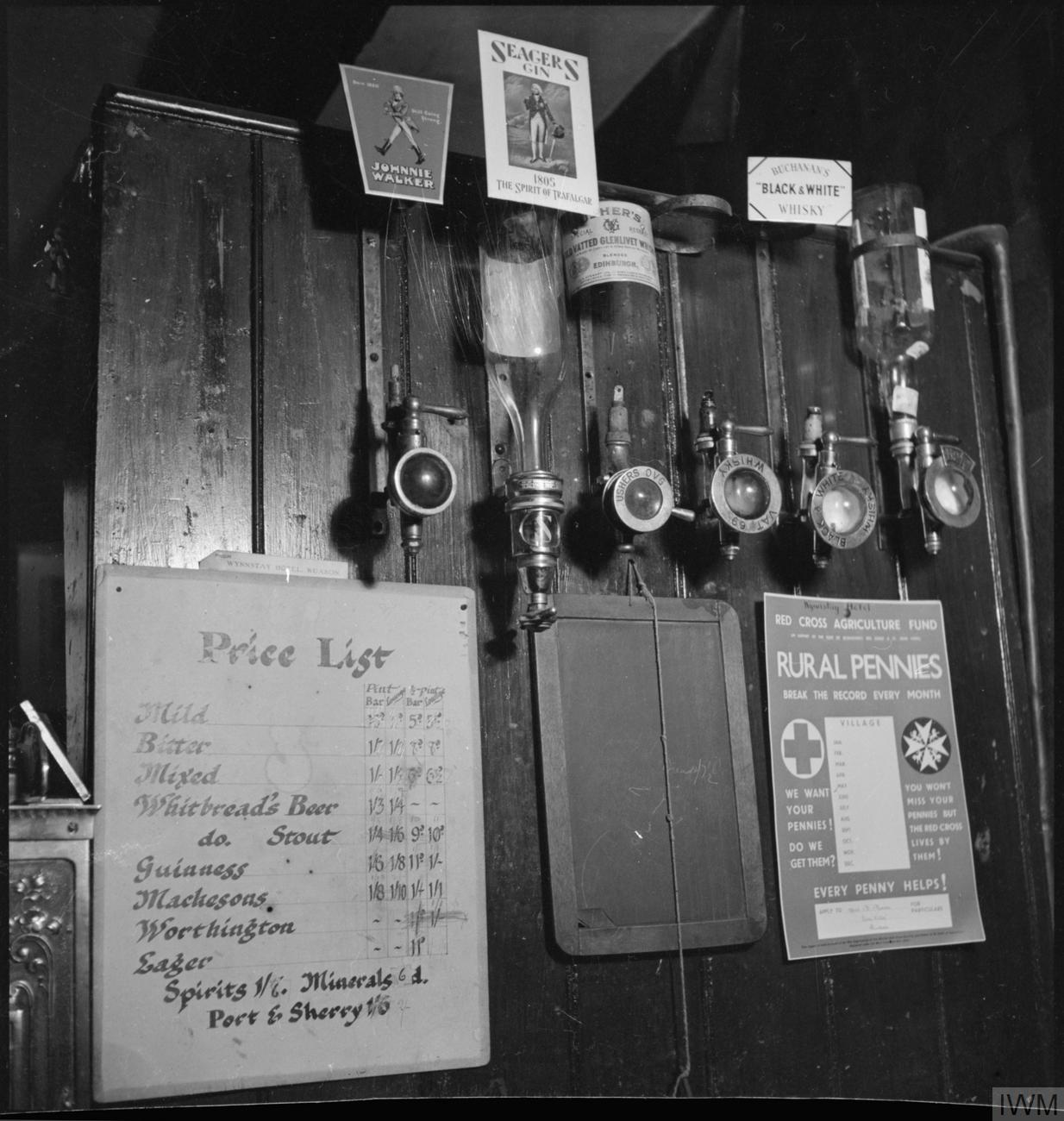
A rack of inverted spirit bottles in a dispenser in the United Kingdom during World War II

=== Optic ===
The optic or non-drip measure is mounted beneath an inverted spirit bottle, so that a pre-defined volume of the bottle's contents drains into the measure. Lifting a lever on the side of the measure first closes off the measure from the bottle, then dispenses the measured liquid into the glass or mixing vessel held underneath. This mechanism ensures that a correct spirit measure can be dispensed each time, as the inverted bottle allows the measure to be replenished in the optic after each shot has been dispensed. These types of measures are commonly used for highly demanded drinks in professional bar settings, and are often incorporated into visually-appealing machines that serve both functional and marketing purposes for the liquor being poured. Bottles are available to the trade with their labels affixed upside down so that they will be the right way up when mounted on the optic.

The terms Optic, Optic Pearl, OpticJade and OpticOpal are all trademarks of Gaskell & Chambers owned by the company IMI Cornelius (UK) Ltd, but the word "optic" has become synonymous with inverted or non-drip spirit measures. Other manufacturers, such as Beaumont TM, also supply this type of measuring device.

=== Thimble ===
The thimble measure is a stainless steel vessel, like a shot glass, either with predefined measuring lines etched or stamped into the sides, or else pre-sized so that pouring up to the brim of the measure yields the correct volume. This second variation is commonly seen in a double-thimble or "hourglass" form, with two metal cups of different volumes (often in a 3:2 or 2:1 ratio, like a U.S. standard 1.5 fl oz "jigger" and 1 fl oz "pony", or UK standard 25/50mL or 35/70mL combos) spot-welded to each other at their relative bottom surfaces, possibly with a handle between them, allowing one unit to easily measure two common volumes.

Thimble measures are popular for home use, as they allow a relatively untrained person to pour quickly and accurately from several bottles without risking cross-contamination between them, or requiring the purchase, use and cleaning of a pour spout for each bottle as would be seen in a professional bar.

=== Free-flow pour spout ===
Common in U.S. bars, these devices consist of a simple rubber or plastic stopper with a metal or plastic tube fitted into it, and often a second smaller tube extending down into the bottle, designed to replace the cap or cork on a bottle of liquor. The spout, in the U.S., is usually calibrated to allow a flow of 1 fluid ounce per second, so that a bartender can measure accurate and consistent shots of liquor or portions for cocktails based on timed pours, without needing to use a jigger or other measuring device.

=== Measured pour spout ===
Common in U.S. bars, these devices appear visually to be the same as a free-flow pour spout, but have an internal mechanism to block the tube after a pre-defined and calibrated volume of liquid has passed, oftentimes a set of 2 or 3 balls. Because of the geometry, the bottle with one of these spouts needs to be held at a specific angle, typically 45 degrees, otherwise the volume poured will be under or over the stated calibration.

=== Ball-measuring cap ===
Common in France, where it is called a bouchon doseur boule, this device consists of a transparent T-shaped glass tube arrangement, with a ball on one end of the horizontal section, a cap or cork on the other end, and a cork or plastic bottle stopper on the bottom of the T, allowing the measure to replace the cap of a liquor bottle. In use, the bottle is inverted until the ball fills with liquor, and then tilted in the other direction to let the liquor pour out the spout in a manner that keeps additional liquor entering the measure from the bottle.

== Legislation ==
The Weights and Measures Act 1963 made it illegal in Britain for businesses to give short weights or short measures to consumers. Before this there was no legislation, only guidelines as to the correct weight of an alcoholic spirit measure, and if spirit measures or optics were used, they required a government stamp to certify that the measure was accurate. This act specified that only gin, rum, vodka and whisky were spirits and had to be served in the prescribed measured quantities using an approved optic measure. All other drinks are not spirits (for the purposes of the act) and could be free poured. Today, these other drinks may not be free poured, but must be measured, though the bar is free to choose the size of the measure (which must be advertised). In practice, most bars will use the same size measure as for the four spirits.

The 1963 act formalized the legal measures by which spirits and other alcoholic beverages should be dispensed, namely 1/4, 1/5 or 1/6 gill (36, 28 or 24 ml), but this was replaced in 1985 when 25 ml or 35 ml were permitted. Landlords have the option to decide which quantity they sell, with the difference being caused by historically larger measures being used in Scotland and Northern Ireland. The landlord can choose one or the other but not both.

Thimble measures are also used in 175 ml and 250 ml volumes for measuring wine. Although government stamped for the correct volume, the thimble measure does rely on the user measuring the wine out manually into the thimble.
