= Parc and Dare Hall =

Coordinates: 51.6590°N 3.5063°W

Park and Dare Theatre
- Parc and Dare Hall, Theatr y Parc a'r Dâr
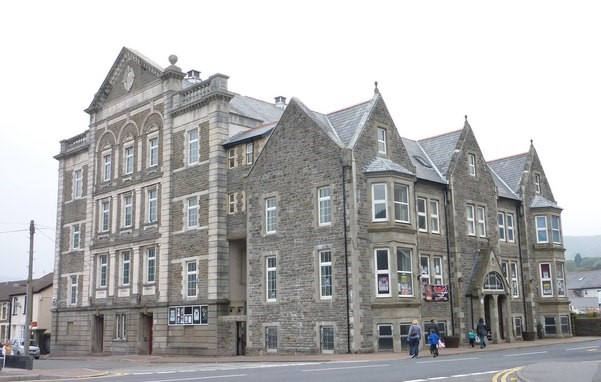
- Interactive map of Park and Dare Theatre
- Address: Station Road; Treorchy; Wales, UK
- Capacity: 660

Construction
- Opened: 1913

Website
- rct-theatres.co.uk

The Parc and Dare Hall, now known as the Park and Dare Theatre (Welsh: Theatr y Parc a'r Dâr), is a former Miners' institute but now serves as a large entertainment venue in the town of Treorchy, in the Rhondda Valley of Wales. Since the demolition of the Abercynon Workingmen's Hall, the Parc and Dare Workingmen's Hall is the largest in the South Wales Coalfield. It is a Grade II* listed building.

== History ==
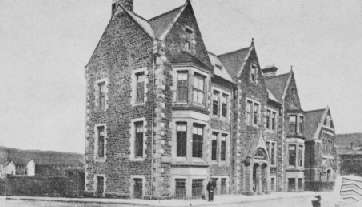
The Parc and Dare Workingman's Club in 1894

The Parc and Dare Hall was built in 1892, and began its life as a working men's library and institute. The workers of the Park and the Dare Collieries funded the building by a donating a penny from each pound of their wages. It was a place where the miners could meet and socialise and featured a bar and a library.

In the early twentieth century work began on the Parc and Dare Hall, adding a large theatre, initially to be used as a variety show venue. In 1913 the theatre was completed, the external style of the building being influenced by the contemporary architecture of Welsh Nonconformist chapels. Due to the declining popularity of theatre and the emergence of cinema, by 1920 a cinema screen was installed. In 1930, the first 'talkie' picture to be screened was The Broadway Melody, and people flocked from miles around to hear this innovation.

In 1975, the theatre was in such a state of disrepair that its closure was inevitable. The Parc & Dare Workmen's Institute Committee, faced with this daunting possibility, donated the building to the then Rhondda Borough Council.

Today the Parc and Dare is still used as a functioning theatre and cinema. Most theatre productions tend to be locally produced, for example by The Rhondda Theatre Group, but the venue is also used by touring musicians and comedians. Over the years it has been graced by the biggest stars in show business including the likes of Max Boyce, Ken Dodd and the Kinks' Ray Davies. In 2007 the Parc and Dare was used in filming the theatre stage scenes in "Daleks in Manhattan" and "Evolution of the Daleks", the fourth and fifth episodes of series 3 of the BBC's revived Doctor Who series.

== Architecture and design ==
The former Parc and Dare Institute is now connected at various levels to the Hall and provides the rehearsal rooms, offices and public areas. The façade conceals an auditorium that, as with most of its kind in Wales, is at first floor level. It is a hall with two curved galleries, the slips of each extending to and meeting the proscenium wall. Each gallery front retains its original decorative plasterwork. The proscenium arch is decorated over its entire length with plasterwork representing fruit and flowers. The Parc and Dare is still an Edwardian proscenium-arched theatre that acts as a venue for live performance, cinema and community events. The Parc and Dare is a Grade II* listed building and stands as the tallest building in Treorchy.

The Parc and Dare Workingmen's Hall once had a clock above its entrance. The clock, on Station Road, was added around the same time as the theatre hall, but was removed in the 1970s during renovations and was never replaced.
