= Andrew Bishop (rugby union) =

Wales international rugby union footballer

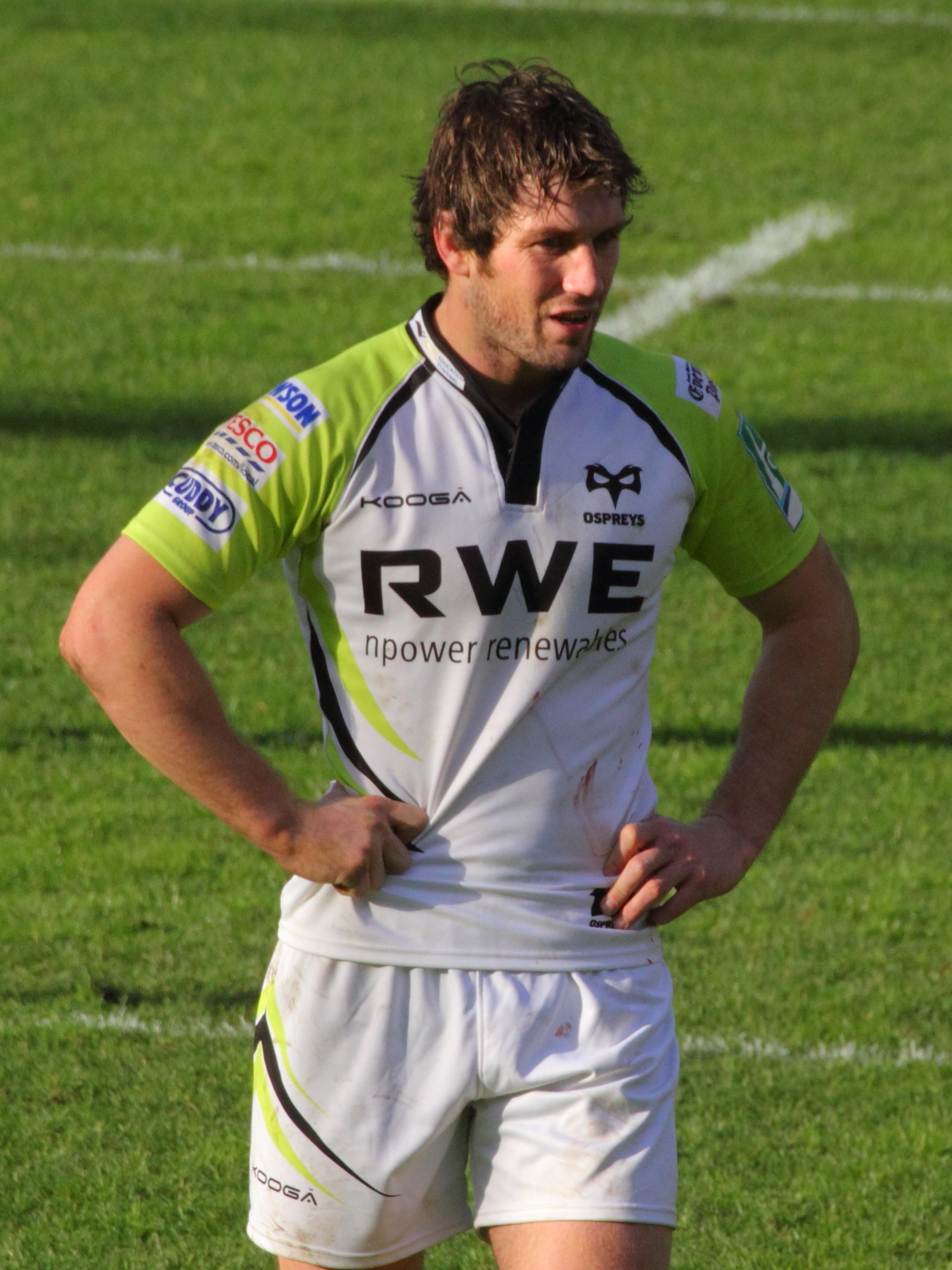
- Born: Andrew Bishop; 7 August 1985 (age 41) Treherbert, Wales
- Height: 6 ft 0 in (1.83 m)
- Weight: 15 st 2 lb (96 kg)
- Notable relative: David Bishop (brother)

Rugby union career
- Position: Centre
- Current team: Ospreys
Senior career
Years	Team	Apps	(Points)
2005-2015	Ospreys	209	(50)
International career
Years	Team	Apps	(Points)
2008–2015	Wales	16	(0)
- Correct as of 17:00, 2 June 2012 (UTC)

Andrew Bishop (born 7 August 1985) is a former Welsh international rugby union player who played for the Ospreys at Centre.

He was a stalwart of the Wales Under 21 Grand Slam victory in 2005. In May 2008 he was selected for the Wales' squad for the 2008 Tour of South Africa, making his debut as a substitute in the 2nd test on 14 June. Wales lost 37–21. He kept his place in the squad throughout the 2008–09 season and on 14 November, he made his first start against Canada. Wales won 34–13. He came on as a replacement in the 18th minute for Jamie Roberts in the match against the Wallabies. Critics thought this would affect Wales but Bishop held his own as Wales won 21–18, the only win that for Northern Hemisphere against one of The Big Three. Bishop then came on as a substitute against Scotland in the Six Nations. He it was his only game time in the tournament, although he was an unused replacement against England. Bishop then started for Wales on their North America tour opener against Canada. The Welsh team were missing players due to the Lions tour and injuries but still won 32–23. Bishop then started against United States. Wales won 48–15.

On 18 January 2010 he was named in the 35 man Wales national Squad for the 2010 Six Nations tournament. He was on the bench for every game, only coming on against Ireland.

On 8 October Bishop was forced to retire because of a recurring back injury.

== Personal life ==
His brother David was also a professional rugby union player and was a Wales Under-21 international.

He now coaches Treorchy RFC. His daughters are Lara Bishop, Mila Bishop and Indie Bishop.

== International Caps ==
Cap Number	Date	Team	Position	Shirt Number	Home or Away	Venue	Result	Score
1	14 June 2008	South Africa	Substitute	21	Away	Loftus Versfeld, Pretoria	Loss	21–37
2	14 November 2008	Canada	Centre	12	Home	Millennium Stadium, Cardiff	Won	34–13
3	29 November 2008	Australia	Substitute	22	Home	Millennium Stadium, Cardiff	Won	21–18
4	8 February 2009	Scotland	Substitute	22	Away	Murrayfield, Edinburgh	Won	26–13
5	30 May 2009	Canada	Centre	12	Away	York Stadium, Toronto	Won	32–23
6	6 June 2009	United States	Centre	12	Away	Toyota Park, Bridgeview, Illinois	Won	48–15
7	21 November 2009	Argentina	Substitute	21	Home	Millennium Stadium, Cardiff	Won	33–16
8	28 November 2009	Australia	Substitute	21	Home	Millennium Stadium, Cardiff	Lost	12–33
9	13 March 2010	Ireland	Substitute	21	Away	Croke Park, Dublin	Lost	12–27
10	20 March 2010	Italy	Substitute	21	Home	Millennium Stadium, Cardiff	Won	33–10
11	19 June 2010	New Zealand	Centre	13	Away	Carisbrook, Dunedin	Lost	9–42
12	6 November 2010	Australia	Centre	12	Home	Millennium Stadium, Cardiff	Lost	16–25
13	13 November 2010	South Africa	Substitute	21	Home	Millennium Stadium, Cardiff	Lost	25–29
14	19 November 2010	Fiji	Centre	12	Home	Millennium Stadium, Cardiff	Drew	16–16
15	27 November 2010	New Zealand	Substitute	22	Home	Millennium Stadium, Cardiff	Lost	25–37
16	2 June 2012	Barbarians	Centre	13	Home	Millennium Stadium, Cardiff	Won	30–21
