= Douglas-Pennant =

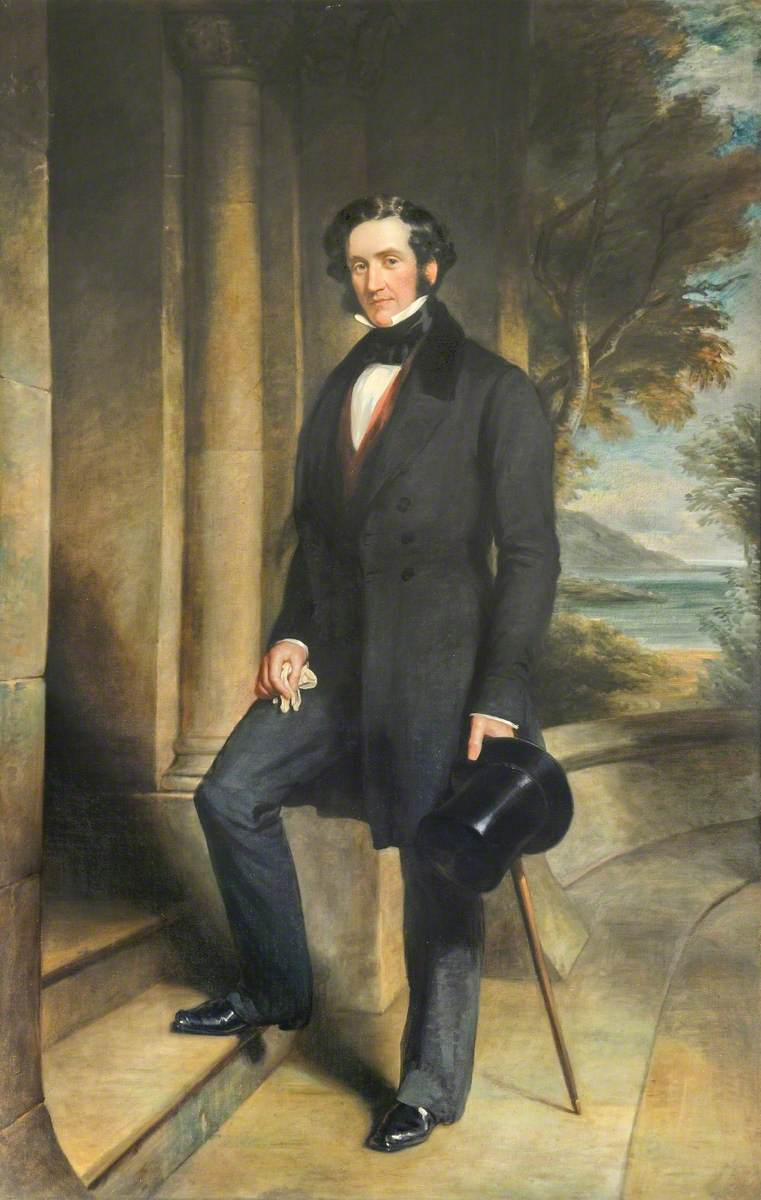
Edward Douglas-Pennant, 1st Baron Penrhyn.

Douglas-Pennant may refer to:

- Sir Cyril Douglas-Pennant (1894–1961), Royal Navy officer
- Edward Douglas-Pennant, 1st Baron Penrhyn (1800–1886), British landowner and politician
- Edward Douglas-Pennant, 3rd Baron Penrhyn (1864–1927), British politician
- Frank Douglas-Pennant, 5th Baron Penrhyn (1865–1967), British nobleman
- George Douglas-Pennant, 2nd Baron Penrhyn (1836–1907), British landowner
- Hugh Douglas-Pennant, 4th Baron Penrhyn (1894–1949), British nobleman and army officer
- Malcolm Douglas-Pennant, 6th Baron Penrhyn (1908–2003), Welsh peer, soldier, rifleman and farmer
- Muriel FitzRoy, 1st Viscountess Daventry (nee Douglas-Pennant) (1869–1962), British aristocrat
- Simon Douglas-Pennant, 7th Baron Penrhyn (born 1938), British nobleman
- Violet Douglas-Pennant (1869–1945), British philanthropist
