= Portrait of Diego Ortiz de Zúñiga =

Painting by Bartolomé Esteban Murillo

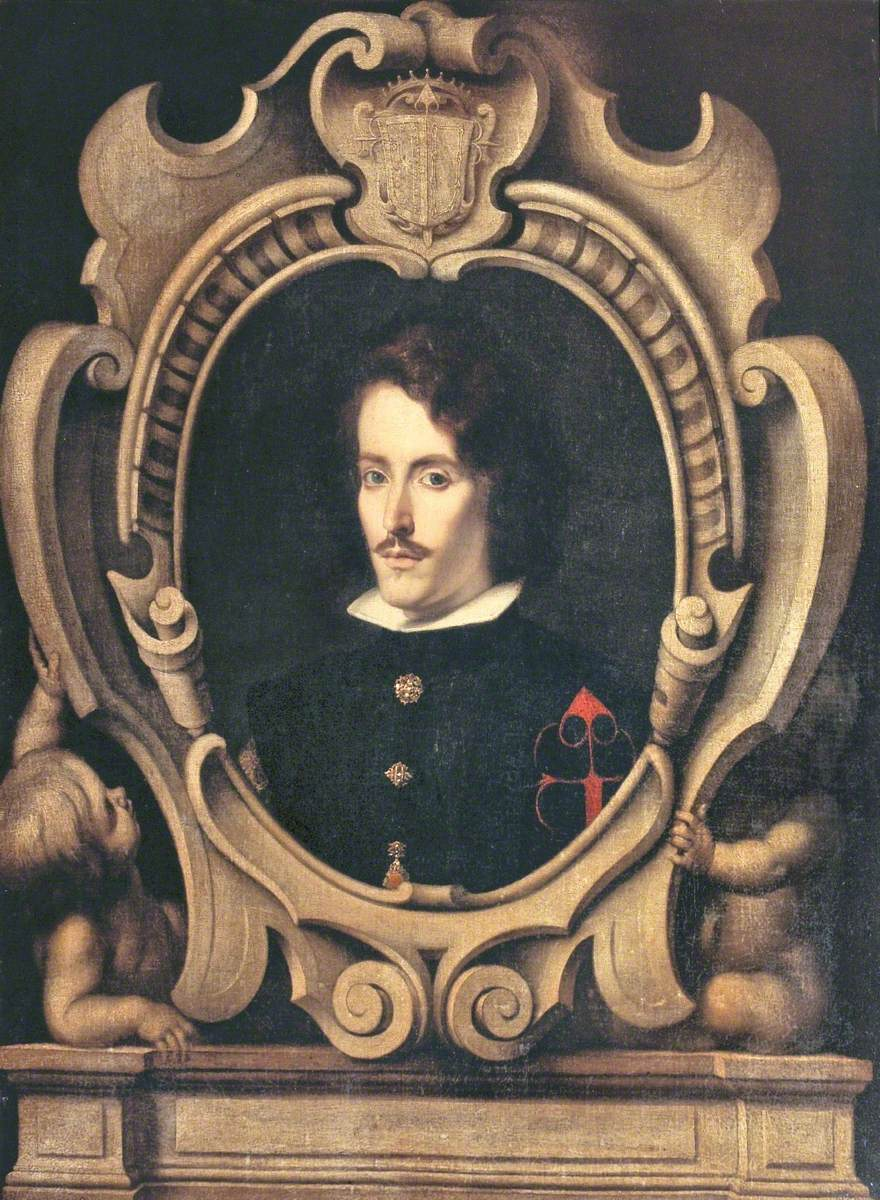
- Artist: Bartolomé Esteban Murillo
- Year: c. 1653
- Dimensions: 113 cm (44 in) × 94 cm (37 in)
- Location: Penrhyn Castle
- Accession No.: 1420344
- Identifiers: Art UK artwork ID: count-diego-ortiz-de-zuiga-16331680-102308

Portrait of Diego Ortiz de Zúñiga is an oil on canvas portrait of the Spanish historian, writer and nobleman Diego Ortiz de Zúñiga, measuring 113 cm by 94 cm. It has been thought to be an autograph work by the Spanish painter Bartolomé Esteban Murillo, then a copy after an original work by Murillo, and is now thought to be an autograph work once again following a 2017 re-attribution by the art historian Benito Navarrete Prieto. It dates to around 1653.

It was probably sold by the sitter's family in the mid-eighteenth century. Its first recorded provenance is as lot 28 in the 15 May 1858 auction of the collection of Colonel Hugh Baillie. In the 1870s it was bought from the art dealer Charles Johannes Nieuwenhuys (1799 - 1883) by Edward Douglas-Pennant, 1st Baron Penrhyn (1800 – 1886) to furnish his new Penrhyn Castle. At that time it was thought to be an original Murillo, but (partly due to heavy discoloration in its varnish) it was reassigned as a copy by 1901. It was passed down through Douglas-Pennant's descendants and is now owned by Richard Douglas-Pennant, great-grandson via the female line of the 3rd Baron Penrhyn. It is currently on long-term loan to Penrhyn Castle, which is now a National Trust property.

== Copy ==
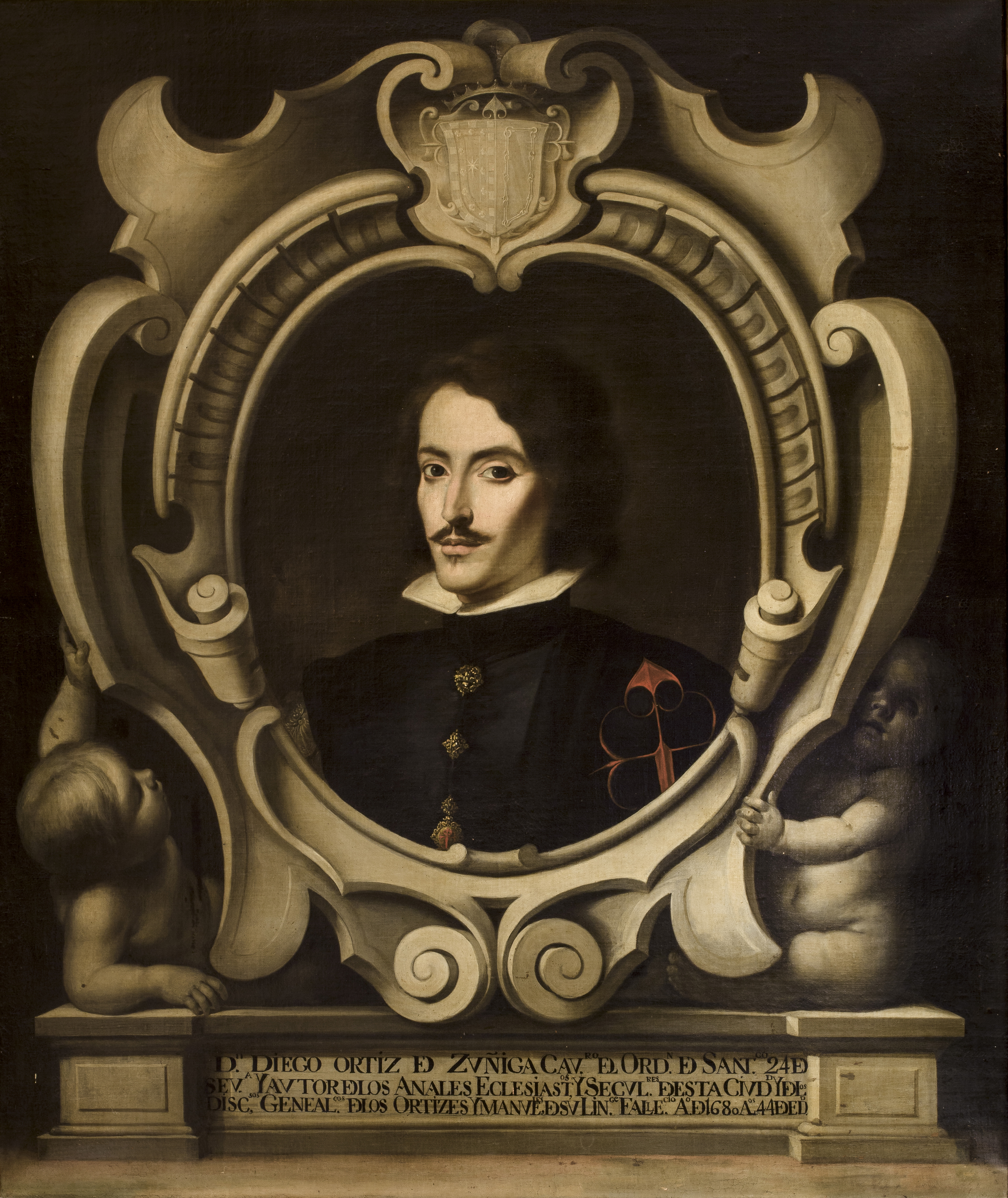
Copy of the portrait, 1751, now in Seville town hall.

A copy of the work now hangs in the town hall in Seville, attributed to Domingo Martínez. This was made in 1751, possibly commissioned by the sitter's family just before they sold the original work. It once hung in the former Augustinian College of San Acacio in Seville, later converted into a town library. The painting was finally donated to the city of Seville by the sitter's grandson José Ortiz de Zúñiga, marquis of Montefuerte.
