= Simon Douglas-Pennant, 7th Baron Penrhyn =

British nobleman

The Right Honourable The Lord Penrhyn
Personal information
- Born: 28 June 1938 (age 88); Jordanhill, Glasgow, Scotland
- Batting: Right-handed
- Bowling: Left-arm fast-medium
- Relatives: Cyril Douglas-Pennant (uncle)

Domestic team information
- Years: Team
- 1959–1961: Cambridge University

Career statistics
Competition	First-class
Matches	35
Runs scored	101
Batting average	4.59
100s/50s	0/0
Top score	14*
Balls bowled	5962
Wickets	83
Bowling average	36.51
5 wickets in innings	3
10 wickets in match	1
Best bowling	7/56
Catches/stumpings	6/–
- Source: Cricinfo, 10 July 2019

Simon Douglas-Pennant, 7th Baron Penrhyn (born 28 June 1938), is a British nobleman. He is the current holder of the title of Baron Penrhyn – he succeeded his father Nigel's elder brother the 6th Baron, who died without male issue in 2003.

He studied at Eton College and Clare College, Cambridge, where he represented the university at cricket from 1959 to 1961 as a left-arm opening bowler. In the match against Free Foresters in 1959 he took his best innings and match figures in first-class cricket: 7 for 56 and 3 for 115, for match figures of 10 for 171.

On 5 October 1963 he married Josephine Upcott, daughter of Robert Upcott. They have four children:

- Sophie Margaret (born 11 December 1964)
- Edward Sholto (born 6 June 1966), heir apparent to the title
- Hugo Charles (born 21 April 1969)
- Harriet Josephine (born 25 May 1972)

== Arms ==
Coat of arms of Simon Douglas-Pennant, 7th Baron Penrhyn

Escutcheon
Quarterly 1st & 4th per bend sinister Ermine and Ermines a lion rampant Or (Pennant) 2nd & 3rd grand quarters quarterly 1st & 4th Argent a man's heart Gules ensigned with an Imperial crown Proper on a chief Azure three mullets Argent 2nd & 3rd Argent three piles Gules on the outer two a mullet of the field (Douglas).
Supporters
On either side an antelope Proper collared and chain reflexed over the back Or and pendant from the collar of the dexter supporter an escutcheon Gules charged with the bust of a man's head affrontée Proper.
Motto
Æquo Animo (With An Even Mind)

Peerage of the United Kingdom
Preceded by Malcolm Douglas-Pennant	Baron Penrhyn; 2003–present	Incumbent; Heir apparent: Hon. Edward Douglas-Pennant
