= Baron Penrhyn =

Barony in the Peerage of the United Kingdom

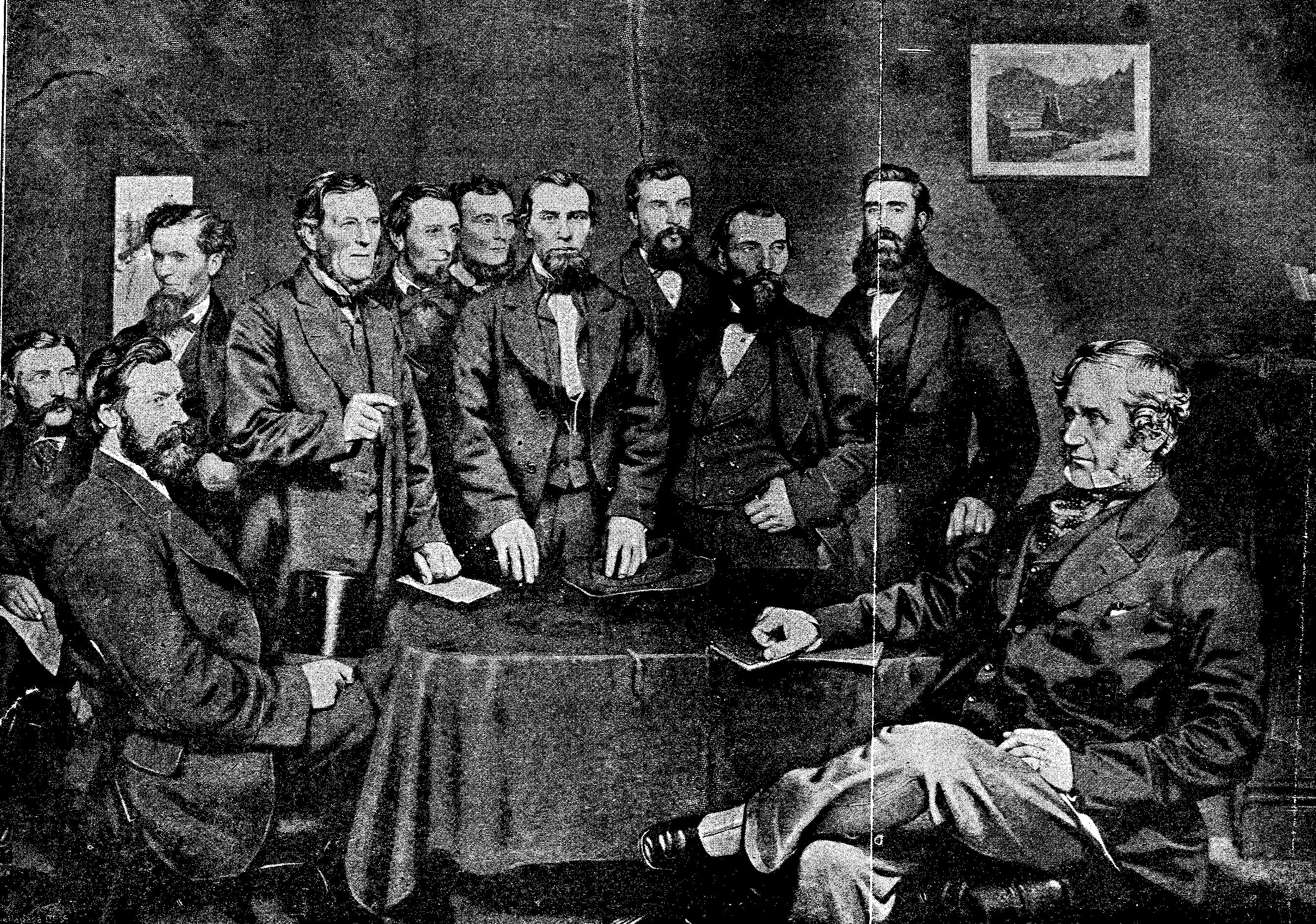
Edward Douglas-Pennant, 1st Baron Penrhyn, with a deputation of quarrymen from the Penrhyn Quarry

Baron Penrhyn is a title that has been created twice. The first creation came in the Peerage of Ireland in 1783 in favour of Richard Pennant, who had previously served as a Member of Parliament for Petersfield and Liverpool. This creation became extinct on his death in 1808. The next creation came in 1866 in the Peerage of the United Kingdom when the Conservative politician Edward Douglas-Pennant was created Baron Penrhyn, of Llandegai in the County of Carnarvon. He had previously represented Carnarvon in the House of Commons and also served as Lord Lieutenant of Caernarvonshire. He was granted the estate of his father-in-law (a cousin and heir of the first Baron of the 1783 creation) on the condition that he accepted his wife's maiden name, Pennant. Lord Penrhyn was the younger brother of The 17th Earl of Morton. In 1833 he had married Juliana Isabella Mary Pennant (died 1842), eldest daughter and co-heiress of George Hay Dawkins-Pennant of Penrhyn Castle and in 1841 he assumed by Royal licence the additional surname of Pennant.

Lord Penrhyn was succeeded by his eldest son George Sholto, the second Baron. He also represented Carnarvon in Parliament as a Conservative. On his death the title passed to his son Edward Sholto, the third Baron. He was a Conservative Member of Parliament for Northampton South. He was succeeded by his son Hugh Napier, the fourth Baron. He notably served as Lord Lieutenant of Caernarvonshire from 1933 to 1941. On his death in 1949 the line of the eldest son of the first Baron failed. He was succeeded by his first cousin once removed, the fifth Baron. He was the son of the Hon. Archibald Charles Henry Douglas-Pennant, second son of the first Baron. Lord Penrhyn was 101 years and 74 days when he died on 3 February 1967 and was then the oldest ever peer. This record was not surpassed until the death of the seventh Viscount St Vincent in September 2006. He was succeeded by his son, the sixth Baron. As of 2014 the title is held by the latter's nephew, the seventh Baron, who succeeded in 2003.

Muriel FitzRoy, 1st Viscountess Daventry, wife of the Hon. Edward FitzRoy, Speaker of the House of Commons, was the sister of the fifth Baron Penrhyn. The Douglas family of the second creation are the same of the same lineage as the Marquesses of Queensberry (note the appearance of the middle name Sholto in both families) and are also related to the later Earls of Home.

== Barons Penrhyn, first creation (1783) ==
- Richard Pennant, 1st Baron Penrhyn (c. 1737 – 1808)

== Barons Penrhyn, second creation (1866) ==
- Edward Gordon Douglas-Pennant, 1st Baron Penrhyn (1800–1886)
- George Sholto Gordon Douglas-Pennant, 2nd Baron Penrhyn (1836–1907)
- Edward Sholto Douglas-Pennant, 3rd Baron Penrhyn (1864–1927)
- Hugh Napier Douglas-Pennant, 4th Baron Penrhyn (1894–1949)
- Frank Douglas-Pennant, 5th Baron Penrhyn (1865–1967)
- Malcolm Frank Douglas-Pennant, 6th Baron Penrhyn (1908–2003)
- Simon Douglas-Pennant, 7th Baron Penrhyn (born 1938)

The heir apparent is the present holder's son, the Hon. Edward Sholto Douglas-Pennant (born 1966).

=== Male-line family tree ===
Male-line family tree, Barons Penrhyn.

Edward Douglas-Pennant; 1st Baron Penrhyn; 1800–1886
George Douglas-Pennant; 2nd Baron Penrhyn; 1836–1907	Lt Col. Hon. Archibald Douglas-Pennant; 1837–1884
Edward Douglas-Pennant; 3rd Baron Penrhyn; 1864–1927	Capt. Hon. George Douglas-Pennant; 1876–1915	Hon. Charles Douglas-Pennant; 1877–1914	Frank Douglas-Pennant; 5th Baron Penrhyn; 1865–1967
Lt. Hon. Alan Douglas-Pennant; 1890–1914	Hugh Douglas-Pennant; 4th Baron Penrhyn; 1894–1949	Adm. Hon. Cyril Douglas-Pennant; 1894–1961	Malcolm Douglas-Pennant; 6th Baron Penrhyn; 1908–2003	Maj. Hon. Nigel Douglas-Pennant; 1909–2000
Simon Douglas-Pennant; 7th Baron Penrhyn born 1938
Hon. Edward Douglas-Pennant born 1966

=== Arms ===
Coat of arms of Baron Penrhyn
Crest "1st, Out of a ducal coronet an antelope's head argent, maned and tufted or, charged on the neck with a cross crosslet sable, for distinction; 2nd a sanglier, statant, between two clefts of an oak tree, with a chain and lock holding them together all proper, and above it the motto Lock sicker." Escutcheon "Quarterly: 1st and 4th per bend sinister ermine and ermines, a lion rampant or (Pennant), 2nd and 3rd grand quarters quarterly, 1st and 4th argent, a man's heart gules, ensigned with an Imperial crown proper, on a chief azure, three mullets of the field; 2nd and 3rd argent, three piles gules, on the two outer ones a mullet of the field (Douglas)." Supporters "On either side an antelope proper, collared and chain reflexed over the back or, and pendant from the collar of the dexter supporter an escutcheon gules, charged with the bust of a man's head affrontée proper." Motto Aequo Animo "With an even mind"

== See also ==
- Earl of Morton
- Viscount Daventry
