= Frank Douglas-Pennant, 5th Baron Penrhyn =

British nobleman and army officer (1865–1967)

Frank Douglas-Pennant, 5th Baron Penrhyn (21 November 1865 – 3 February 1967) was a British nobleman and justice of the peace for Northamptonshire.

== Life ==
He attended Eton College and the RMC, Sandhurst and became an officer in the King's Royal Rifle Corps (KRRC), fighting in the Boer War. His first marriage was on 25 April 1892 to Maud Eleonora Hardy, daughter of Colonel John Hardy, but they divorced in 1903. His second was to Alice Nellie Cooper, daughter of Sir William Charles Cooper, 3rd Baronet Cooper of Woollahra.

In January 1893, Douglas-Pennant, who was a Lieutenant in King's Royal Rifle Corps, was appointed as an Extra Aide-de-Camp to the Lord Houghton, General Governor of Ireland. In October 1914, early in the First World War he was made Lieutenant Colonel of the KRRC's 10th (Service) Battalion.

In 1949 the 4th Baron Penrhyn died without issue, leaving the direct male line from the 1st Baron extinct. Frank Douglas-Pennant thus succeeded to the barony at age 83. However, his eldest son predeceased him and so it was inherited, following his death at the age of 101 in 1969, by his second son Malcolm.

== Issue ==
- By Maud Eleonora Hardy:
  - Cyril Douglas-Pennant (1894–1961)
  - Bridget Violet Douglas-Pennant (1899–1978)
  - Eileen Maud Douglas-Pennant (1901–1998)
- By Alice Nellie Cooper:
  - Colonel Malcolm Douglas-Pennant, 6th Baron Penrhyn (1908–2003)
  - Nigel Douglas-Pennant (1909–2000)
  - Susan Victoria Douglas-Pennant (1918–2014)

Peerage of the United Kingdom
Preceded by Hugh Douglas-Pennant	Baron Penrhyn; 1949–1967	Succeeded by Malcolm Douglas-Pennant
