= Malcolm Douglas-Pennant, 6th Baron Penrhyn =

The Right Honourable The Lord Penrhyn DSO MBE

Member of the House of Lords
- Lord Temporal
- as a hereditary peer 3 February 1967 – 11 November 1999
- Preceded by: The 5th Baron Penrhyn
- Succeeded by: Seat abolished (Note: Under the House of Lords Act 1999.)

Personal details
- Born: Malcolm Frank Douglas-Pennant; 11 July 1908
- Died: 8 November 2003 (aged 95)
- Political party: Conservative

Colonel Malcolm Frank Douglas-Pennant, 6th Baron Penrhyn, DSO, MBE (11 July 1908 – 8 November 2003), was a Welsh peer, soldier, rifleman, and farmer, and the second son of Frank Douglas-Pennant, 5th Baron Penrhyn.

== Life ==
Penrhyn was educated at Eton and the Royal Military College, Sandhurst, before joining the 60th Rifles in 1929. He served in India and Burma before working with the Free French forces in North Africa during the Second World War. Douglas-Pennant was awarded an MBE for his involvement in the invasion of Sicily. After the war, he stayed on in Germany until 1948 and spent the rest of his military career training soldiers to fire rifles accurately. He was a noted sharpshooter, and was on the House of Lords shooting team. His older brother predeceased both him and his father without male issue. His father was 101 years and 74 days when he died on 3 February 1967 and was then the oldest ever hereditary peer, a record that was not surpassed until the death of the seventh Viscount St Vincent in September 2006. After Lord Penhryn too died without male issue (he had two daughters), the Penrhyn barony passed to his nephew.

== Notes ==
Peerage of the United Kingdom
Preceded by Frank Douglas-Pennant	Baron Penrhyn; 1967–2003; Member of the House of Lords (1967–1999)	Succeeded by Simon Douglas-Pennant
