= Edward Douglas-Pennant, 1st Baron Penrhyn =

British politician (1800–1886)

The Right Honourable The Lord Penrhyn
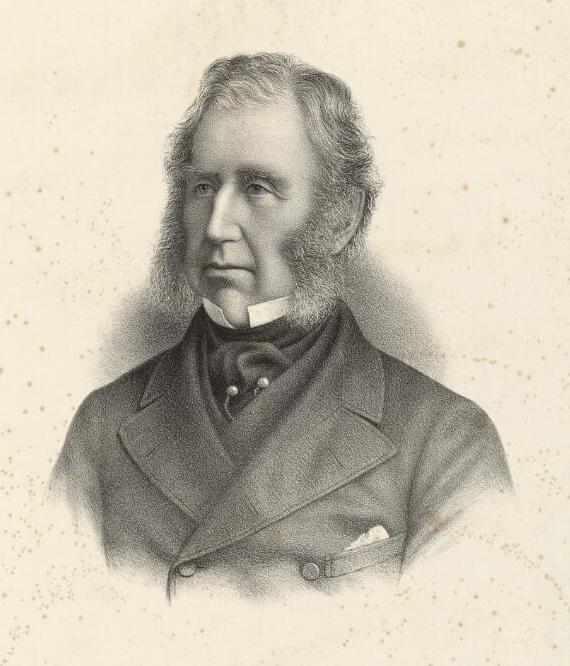

Lord Lieutenant of Caernarvonshire
- In office 1866–1886
- Preceded by: Sir Richard Williams-Bulkeley, Bt
- Succeeded by: John Ernest Greaves

Member of Parliament for Caernarvonshire
- In office 1841–1866
- Preceded by: John Ormsby-Gore
- Succeeded by: George Douglas-Pennant

Personal details
- Born: Edward Gordon Douglas; 6 June 1800 Goldsborough Hall, Yorkshire, England
- Died: 31 March 1886 (age 85) Penrhyn Castle, Gwynedd, Wales
- Children: 11, including George Douglas-Pennant, 2nd Baron Penrhyn

Edward Gordon Douglas-Pennant, 1st Baron Penrhyn (born Douglas; 20 June 1800 – 31 March 1886), was a British Conservative Party politician, landowner in Wales. He played a major part in the development of the Welsh slate industry.

== Life ==
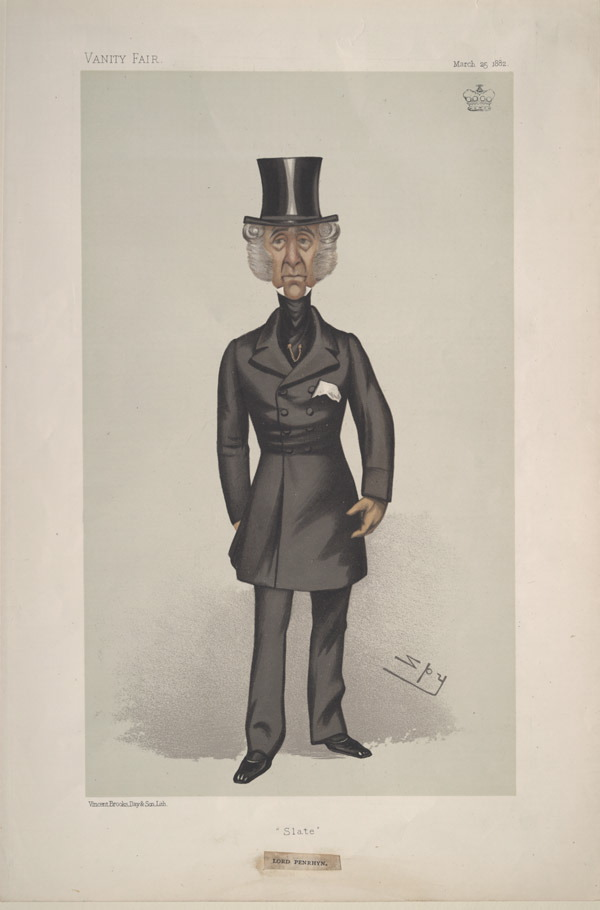
"Slate". Caricature by "Spy" (Leslie Ward) published in Vanity Fair in 1882.

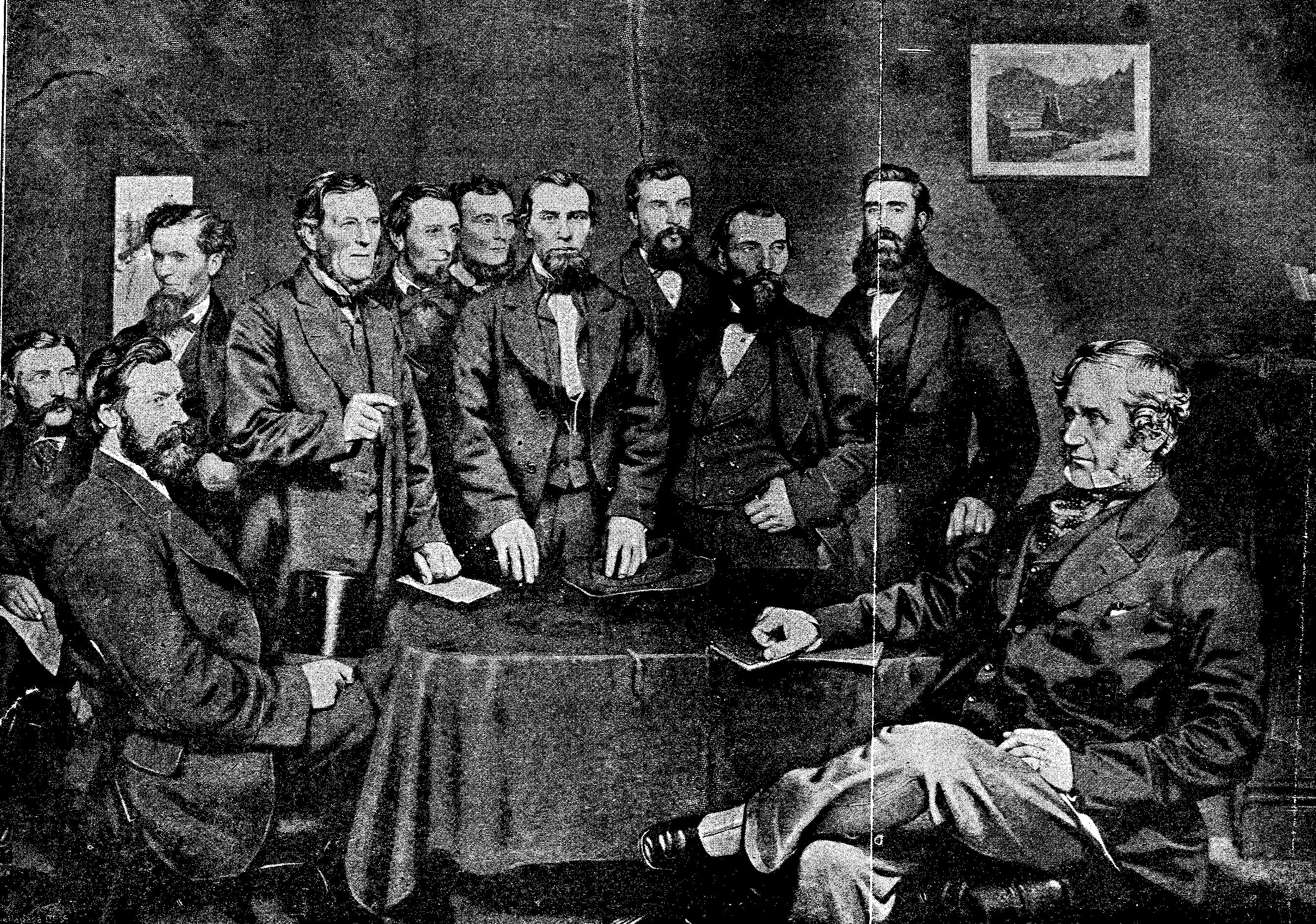
Lord Penrhyn with a deputation of quarrymen from the Penrhyn Quarry

Penrhyn was the younger son of the Hon. John Douglas and his wife, Lady Frances Lascelles, daughter of the 1st Earl of Harewood. The 14th Earl of Morton was his paternal grandfather and The 17th Earl of Morton was his elder brother. He served as an officer in the Grenadier Guards.

He inherited the Penrhyn Estate near Bangor in north-west Wales through his wife's father, George Hay Dawkins-Pennant, and changed his name to Douglas-Pennant by Royal licence in 1841.

This made him the owner of the Penrhyn Quarry near Bethesda, Wales, which under his ownership developed into one of the two largest slate quarries in the world. He was also involved in politics and sat as Member of Parliament for Caernarvonshire between 1841 and 1866. He also held the honorary post of Lord Lieutenant of Caernarvonshire.

On 30 August 1852, he was commissioned as Lieutenant-Colonel Commandant to revive and command the county militia regiment, the Royal Carnarvon Rifles. He commanded the regiment until 1858, when he became its Honorary Colonel.

In 1866, he was raised to the peerage as Baron Penrhyn, of Llandegai in the County of Carnarvon.

In 1868, he sacked 80 workers from Penrhyn Quarry for failing to vote for his son George Douglas-Pennant in the general election.

The village of Llandygai was developed by Lord Penrhyn as a 'model village' for his estate workers, in which 'no corrupting alehouse' was permitted. The village lies immediately outside of the walls of the Penrhyn Castle demesne walls, with the entrance to the village being some 100m from the castle's Grand Lodge. Pennant loaned the land the village was to be built on as a 30-year lease to the quarrymen who were to live there. The quarrymen built the entire village infrastructure and buildings with no help from Pennant, but 30 years later he took full ownership of the land and village.

Lord Penrhyn died in 1886, aged 85.

== Marriage and issue ==
Lord Penrhyn married, firstly, Juliana Isabella Mary (died 25 April 1842), daughter of George Hay Dawkins-Pennant, in 1833. They had two sons and four daughters.

- Hon. Caroline Elizabeth Emma (20 May 1834 – 1 June 1924), married in 1857 James McGarel-Hogg, 1st Baron Magheramorne
- Hon. Emma Juliana Sophia (17 July 1835 – 11 August 1909), died unmarried
- Major Hon. George Sholto Gordon (30 September 1836 – 10 March 1907), married firstly in 1860, Pamela Blanche (died 1989), daughter of Sir Charles Rushout Rushout, 2nd Baronet; secondly to Gertrude Jessy, daughter of Rev. Henry Glynne, M.P.
- Hon. Archibald Charles Henry (22 November 1837 – 7 September 1884), married in 1865, Hon. Harriet Ella Gifford, daughter of Robert Gifford, 2nd Baron Gifford; father of Frank Douglas-Pennant, 5th Baron Penrhyn
- Hon. Eleanor Frances Susan (12 December 1838 – 13 September 1919)
- Harriet (20–24 June 1840), died in infancy

After her death, he married, secondly, Lady Maria Louisa, daughter of Henry FitzRoy, 5th Duke of Grafton, in 1846. They had five daughters:

- Hon. Louisa Mary (13 July 1847 – 19 June 1911), died unmarried
- Hon. Mary Georgina (1 May 1849 – 20 October 1926), died unmarried
- Hon. Eva Anna Caroline (12 January 1852 – 3 January 1934), married Lord William Seymour
- Hon. Gertrude Emma (11 June 1856 – 20 July 1944), died unmarried
- Hon. Adela (26 May 1858 – 26 May 1955), died unmarried

He died in 1886 and was succeeded in the barony by his eldest son, George.

== Arms ==
Coat of arms of Edward Douglas-Pennant, 1st Baron Penrhyn
Crest "1st, Out of a ducal coronet an antelope's head argent, maned and tufted or, charged on the neck with a cross crosslet sable, for distinction; 2nd a sanglier, statant, between two clefts of an oak tree, with a chain and lock holding them together all proper, and above it the motto Lock sicker." Escutcheon "Quarterly: 1st and 4th per bend sinister ermine and ermines, a lion rampant or (Pennant), 2nd and 3rd grand quarters quarterly, 1st and 4th argent, a man's heart gules, ensigned with an Imperial crown proper, on a chief azure, three mullets of the field; 2nd and 3rd argent, three piles gules, on the two outer ones a mullet of the field" (Douglas). Supporters "On either side an antelope proper, collared and chain reflexed over the back or, and pendant from the collar of the dexter supporter an escutcheon gules, charged with the bust of a man's head affrontée proper." Motto Aequo Animo "With an even mind"

== Notes ==
Parliament of the United Kingdom
Preceded by John Ormsby-Gore	Member of Parliament for Caernarvonshire; 1841–1866	Succeeded by George Douglas-Pennant
Honorary titles
Preceded by Sir Richard Williams-Bulkeley, Bt	Lord Lieutenant of Caernarvonshire; 1866–1886	Succeeded by John Ernest Greaves
Peerage of the United Kingdom
New title	Baron Penrhyn; 1866–1886	Succeeded by George Douglas-Pennant
