= Hugh Douglas-Pennant, 4th Baron Penrhyn =

British nobleman and army officer (1894-1949)

Hugh Napier Douglas-Pennant, 4th Baron Penrhyn (6 August 1894 – 26 June 1949) was a British nobleman and army officer.

== Life ==
He was the second of two surviving sons born to Edward Douglas-Pennant, 3rd Baron Penrhyn, and Blanche Georgiana FitzRoy, daughter of Charles FitzRoy, 3rd Baron Southampton. He studied at Eton College and the Royal Military College Sandhurst. He fought in the First World War in the 2nd Dragoons (Royal Scots Greys). He became heir apparent to the barony after his elder brother Alan was killed in 1914 on the Western Front and succeeded to it in 1927 after their father's death.

After the war he was president of the Conservative Association of Carnarvon and also held the offices of Justice of the Peace, Deputy Lord Lieutenant for Caernarvonshire, Lord Lieutenant for Caernarvonshire (1933–1941), knight of the Order of the Hospital of St John of Jerusalem and Honorary Colonel in 6th Battalion Royal Fusiliers (1932–1946). On 25 April 1922 he married the Hon. Sybil Mary Hardinge, daughter of Henry Hardinge, 3rd Viscount Hardinge, and granddaughter of the 2nd Viscount Hardinge – they divorced in 1941 and had no issue, whilst she remarried later that year to Denzil Fortescue, 6th Earl Fortescue.

The 4th Baron died in 1949, still without issue, and so the barony passed to Frank Douglas-Pennant, who was the eldest son of the 1st Baron's second son, Archibald Douglas-Pennant (1837–1884).

Honorary titles
| Preceded by John Ernest Greaves | Lord Lieutenant of Caernarvonshire; 1933–1941 | Succeeded by Sir William Wynne-Finch |
Peerage of the United Kingdom
| Preceded by Edward Douglas-Pennant | Baron Penrhyn; 1927–1949 | Succeeded by Frank Douglas-Pennant |
