= Edward Douglas-Pennant, 3rd Baron Penrhyn =

British noble

Douglas-Pennant in 1895

Edward Sholto Douglas-Pennant, 3rd Baron Penrhyn (10 June 1864 – 22 August 1927), was a British Conservative politician.

A member of the Douglas family headed by the Earl of Morton, Penrhyn was the son of George Douglas-Pennant, 2nd Baron Penrhyn, and his first wife Pamela Blanche, daughter of Sir Charles Rushout, 2nd Baronet. He entered Parliament for Northamptonshire South in the 1895 general election, a seat he held until 1900, when he was replaced by his brother-in-law Edward FitzRoy.

Douglas-Pennant served in the 1st Life Guards as a lieutenant, and later as a major in its Reserve Regiment. Afterwards he served in the Buckinghamshire (Royal Bucks Hussars) Imperial Yeomanry as major and later as lieutenant-colonel. On 1 July 1907 he was appointed Honorary Colonel of the 4th (Royal Carnarvon and Merioneth Militia) Battalion, Royal Welsh Fusiliers, a position that his father and grandfather had also held.

Lord Penrhyn married the Hon. Blanche Georgiana, daughter of Charles FitzRoy, 3rd Baron Southampton, in 1887. Their eldest son, the Hon. Alan George Sholto Douglas-Pennant, was killed in the First World War. Penrhyn died in August 1927 at age 63, and was succeeded in the barony by his second and only surviving son Hugh. Lady Penrhyn died in November 1944.

== Notes ==
Parliament of the United Kingdom
Preceded by David Guthrie	Member of Parliament for Northamptonshire South; 1895–1900	Succeeded by Edward FitzRoy
Peerage of the United Kingdom
Preceded by George Douglas-Pennant	Baron Penrhyn; 1907–1927	Succeeded by Hugh Douglas-Pennant
