= Cyril Douglas-Pennant =

Royal Navy officer

Admiral The Honourable Sir Cyril Douglas-Pennant KCB CBE DSO DSC
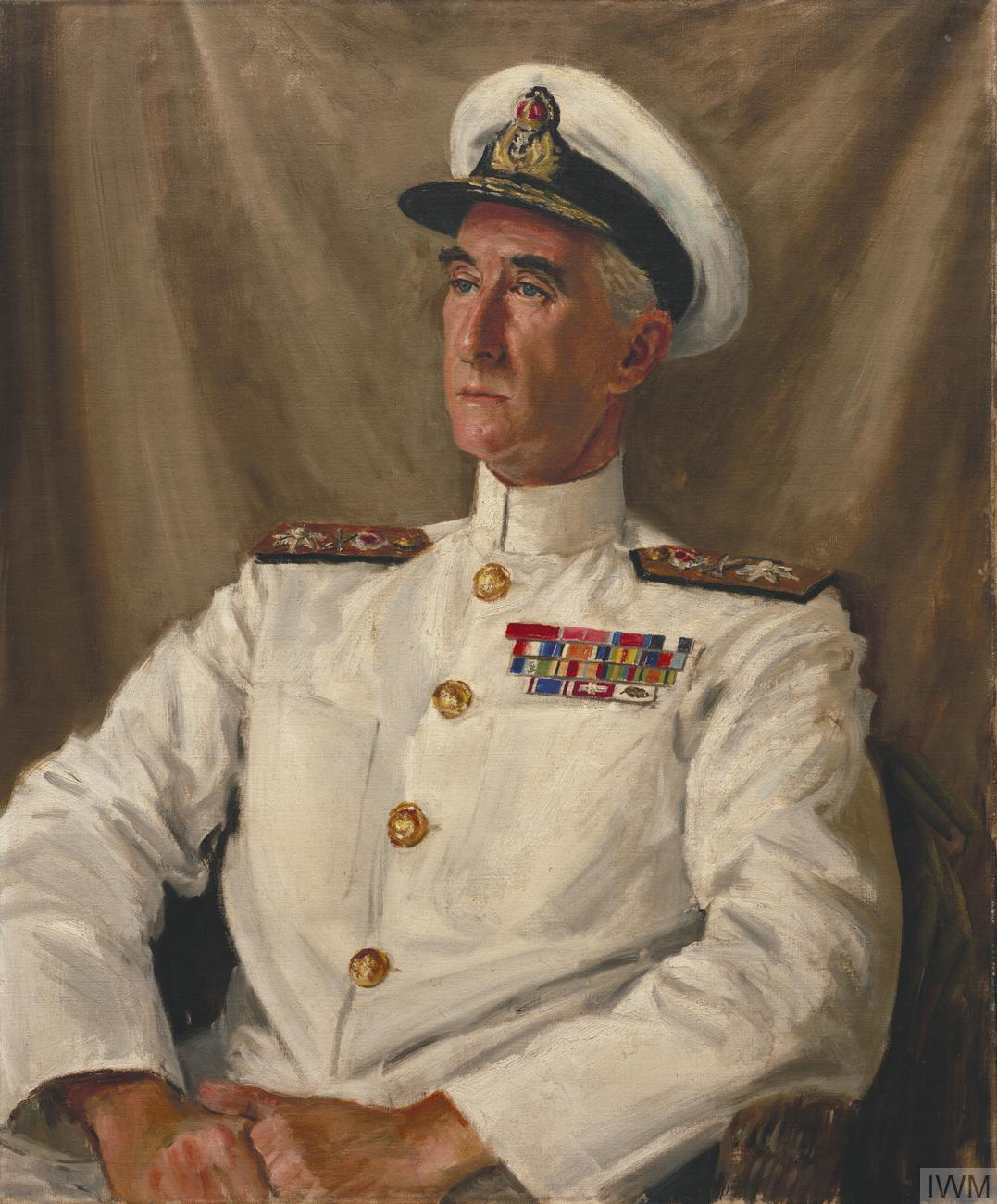
- Rear-Admiral Cyril Douglas-Pennant
- Born: 7 April 1894
- Died: 3 April 1961 (aged 66)
- Military career
- Allegiance: United Kingdom
- Branch: Royal Navy
- Service years: 1907–1953
- Rank: Admiral
- Commands: HMS Despatch; The Nore
- Conflicts: World War I World War II
- Awards: Knight Commander of the Order of the Bath; Commander of the Order of the British Empire; Distinguished Service Order; Distinguished Service Cross

Admiral Sir Cyril Eustace Douglas-Pennant KCB CBE DSO DSC (7 April 1894 – 3 April 1961) was a Royal Navy officer who went on to be Commander-in-Chief, The Nore.

== Naval career ==
Born the son of Frank Douglas-Pennant, 5th Baron Penrhyn, Cyril Douglas-Pennant joined the Royal Navy in 1907. He served in World War I.

He also served in World War II as Captain of the cruiser HMS Despatch. He went on to command the assault forces from HMS Bulolo which landed on Gold Beach during the Normandy landings in 1944.

After the War he became Commandant of the Joint Services Staff College and then Flag Officer (Air) and Second in Command of the Mediterranean Fleet in 1948. He was appointed Senior Naval Representative for the British Joint Services Mission to Washington, D.C., in 1950 and Commander-in-Chief, The Nore, in 1952. He retired in 1953.

Military offices
Preceded by Sir Cecil Harcourt	Commander-in-Chief, The Nore; 1952–1953	Succeeded by Sir Geoffrey Oliver
