= List of elections in 1935 =

The following elections occurred in the year 1935.

== Asia ==
- 1935 Dutch East Indies Volksraad election
- 1935 Hong Kong sanitary board election
- 1935 Iranian legislative election
- 1935 Iraqi parliamentary election
- 1935 Philippine legislative election
- 1935 Philippine presidential election
- 1935 Soviet Union legislative election
- 1935 Turkish general election
- 1935 Turkish presidential election

== Europe ==
- 1935 Czechoslovak parliamentary election
- 1935 Czechoslovak presidential election
- 1935 Danish Folketing election + 1935 Danish local elections
- Germany: 1935 Saar status referendum
- Greece:
  - legislative election
  - monarchy referendum
- 1935 Hungarian parliamentary election
- Netherlands: elections of States-Provincial (nl:Provinciale Statenverkiezingen)
- 1935 Liechtenstein electoral system referendum
- 1935 Polish legislative election
- 1935 Portuguese presidential election
- 1935 Soviet Union legislative election
- 1935 Slovak provincial election
- Switzerland:
  - four referendums
  - 1935 Swiss federal election
- 1935 Turkish general election
- 1935 Turkish presidential election
- 1935 Yugoslavian parliamentary election

=== United Kingdom ===
- 1935 United Kingdom general election
  - England: 1935 United Kingdom general election in England
  - Scotland: 1935 United Kingdom general election in Scotland
  - Wales: 1935 United Kingdom general election in Wales
  - Northern Ireland: 1935 United Kingdom general election in Northern Ireland
  - List of MPs elected in the 1935 United Kingdom general election
- 1935 Cambridge University by-election
- 1935 Combined Scottish Universities by-election
- 1935 Dumfriesshire by-election
- 1935 Eastbourne by-election
- 1935 Edinburgh West by-election
- 1935 Liverpool Wavertree by-election
- 1935 Liverpool West Derby by-election
- 1935 Liverpool West Toxteth by-election
- 1935 Perth by-election
- 1935 Sevenoaks by-election
- 1935 Tamworth by-election
- 1935 Liverpool Wavertree by-election

== North America ==
- 1935 Guatemalan Constituent Assembly election
- 1935 Guatemalan presidential term referendum
- 1935 Salvadoran presidential election

=== Canada ===
- 1935 Canadian federal election
- 1935 Alberta general election
- 1935 Edmonton municipal election
- 1935 New Brunswick general election
- 1935 Ottawa municipal election
- 1935 Prince Edward Island general election
- 1935 Quebec general election
- 1935 Toronto municipal election

=== United States ===
- 1935 New York state election

==== United States lieutenant gubernatorial ====
- 1935 Mississippi lieutenant gubernatorial election

==== United States gubernatorial ====
- 1935 Kentucky gubernatorial election
- 1935 Mississippi gubernatorial election
- 1935 United States gubernatorial elections

==== United States House of Representatives ====
- 1935 United States House of Representatives elections

==== United States mayoral elections ====
- 1935 Baltimore mayoral election
- 1935 Chicago mayoral election
- 1935 Hartford, Connecticut mayoral election
- 1935 Manchester, New Hampshire mayoral election
- 1935 Philadelphia mayoral election
- 1935 San Diego mayoral election
- 1935 San Francisco mayoral election
- 1935 Springfield mayoral election

== Oceania ==
- 1935 New Zealand general election

=== Australia ===
- 1935 Fawkner by-election
- 1935 Gordon state by-election
- 1935 Katanning state by-election
- 1935 Newcastle by-election
- 1935 New South Wales state election
- 1935 Queensland state election
- 1935 Victorian state election

== See also ==
- Category:1935 elections
