= 1935 United Kingdom general election in Northern Ireland =

- 14 November 1935

13 seats in Northern Ireland of the 615 seats in the House of Commons
- Turnout: 72.0% (▼2.5 pp)

	First party	Second party
Leader	Viscount Craigavon	T. J. Campbell
Party	UUP	Nationalist
Alliance	Conservative & National Government
Leader since	1921	1934
Leader's seat	Did not stand	Did not stand
Last election	11 seats, 56.1%	2 seats, 38.9%
Seats won	11 (Note: Includes 7 members elected unopposed.)	2
Seat change	Steady	Steady
Popular vote	292,840 (Note: Voting took place in 6 of 13 seats. The other MPs were unopposed.)	101,494
Percentage	64.9%	18.3%
Swing	▲8.8%	▼20.6%

The 1935 United Kingdom general election in Northern Ireland was held on 14 November as part of the wider general election. There were ten constituencies, seven single-seat constituencies with MPs elected by FPTP and three two-seat constituencies with MPs elected by bloc voting.

When combined with results from across the United Kingdom, the election resulted in a second landslide victory for the three-party National Government, which was led by Stanley Baldwin of the Conservative Party after the resignation of Ramsay MacDonald due to ill health earlier in the year. It is the most recent general election in United Kingdom to have seen any party or alliance of parties win a majority of the popular vote.

This was the last election during the reign of King George V, who died in 1936. Due to the outbreak of the Second World War in 1939, the next general election was not held until 1945.

== Candidates ==
Below is a table summarising the candidates of the 1935 general election in Northern Ireland in the county and borough constituencies, and those in Queen's University of Belfast.

Affiliation	Candidates
Ulster Unionist Party	13
Independent Republican	3
Nationalist Party	2
Total	18

== Results ==
This election saw no change in the distribution of seats from Northern Ireland. Seven MPs were elected unopposed, all of them Ulster Unionists.

In the election as a whole, a second National Government which had been formed before the election was returned with Stanley Baldwin of the Conservative Party as Prime Minister. The Ulster Unionists were members of the Conservative Party. Also in the government were the National Liberal Party and National Labour.

Party	Leader	Candidates	Seats					Aggregate votes		
Party	Leader	Candidates	Total	Gains	Losses	Net	Of total (%)	Total	Of total (%) (Note: Adjusted for multi-member constituencies.)	Change (%)
UUP	Viscount; Craigavon	13	11	0	2	Steady	84.6	292,840	64.9	▲8.8
Nationalist	Thomas Joseph Campbell	2	2	0	0	Steady	15.4	101,494	18.3	▼20.6
Independent; Republican	—N/a	3	0	New			—	56,833	16.8	New
Total		18	13			0	100.0	451,167	100.0	0.0
Registered voters, and turnout								401,273 (Note: Electorate in contested constituencies. The total electorate was 805,220.)	72.0	▼2.5

=== Popular vote ===
Popular vote
UUP	64.9%
National	18.3%
Ind. Republican	16.8%

Popular vote (coalitions)
Nat. Gov.	64.9%
National	18.3%
Ind. Republican	16.8%

=== Parliamentary seats ===
Parliamentary seats
UUP	84.6%
Ind. Unionist	15.4%

Parliamentary seats (coalitions)
Nat. Gov.	84.6%
Ind. Unionist	15.4%

== MPs elected ==
Constituency	Party	MP
Antrim	Ulster Unionist	Sir Joseph McConnell, Bt
Antrim	Ulster Unionist	Hugh O'Neill
Armagh	Ulster Unionist	William Allen
Belfast East	Ulster Unionist	Herbert Dixon
Belfast North	Ulster Unionist	Thomas Somerset
Belfast South	Ulster Unionist	William Stewart
Belfast West	Ulster Unionist	Alexander Browne
Down	Ulster Unionist	Viscount Castlereagh
Down	Ulster Unionist	David Reid
Fermanagh and Tyrone	Nationalist	Patrick Cunningham
Fermanagh and Tyrone	Nationalist	Anthony Mulvey
Londonderry	Ulster Unionist	Sir Ronald Ross, Bt
Queen's University of Belfast	Ulster Unionist	Thomas Sinclair

=== By-elections ===
By-election	Date	Incumbent	Party	Winner	Party	Cause
Down	10 May 1939	David Reid	UUP	James Little	UUP	Death
Belfast East	8 February 1940	Herbert Dixon	UUP	Henry Harland	UUP	Elevation to the Peerage
Queen's University of Belfast	2 November 1940	Thomas Sinclair	UUP	Douglas Savory	UUP	Resignation
Belfast West	9 February 1943	Alexander Browne	UUP	Jack Beattie	NI Labour	Death
Antrim	11 February 1943	Sir Joseph McConnell, Bt	UUP	John Dermot Campbell	UUP	Death

== See also ==
- 1935 United Kingdom general election in England
- 1935 United Kingdom general election in Scotland
- 1935 United Kingdom general election in Wales
