= 1940 Queen's University of Belfast by-election =

UK Parliamentary by-election

The 1940 Queen's University of Belfast by-election was held on 2 November 1940. The by-election was held due to the resignation of the incumbent Ulster Unionist MP, Thomas Sinclair. It was won by the unopposed Ulster Unionist candidate Douglas Savory.

== Result ==
Queen's University of Belfast by-election, 2 November 1940
Party	Candidate	Votes	%	±%
UUP	Douglas Savory	Unopposed		
UUP hold				

== Previous result ==
General election 1935: Queen's University of Belfast
Party	Candidate	Votes	%	±%
UUP	Thomas Sinclair	Unopposed		
UUP hold				
