= 1935 United Kingdom general election in England =

- 14 November 1935

All 492 English seats to the House of Commons
- Turnout: 70.7% (▼5.4 pp)
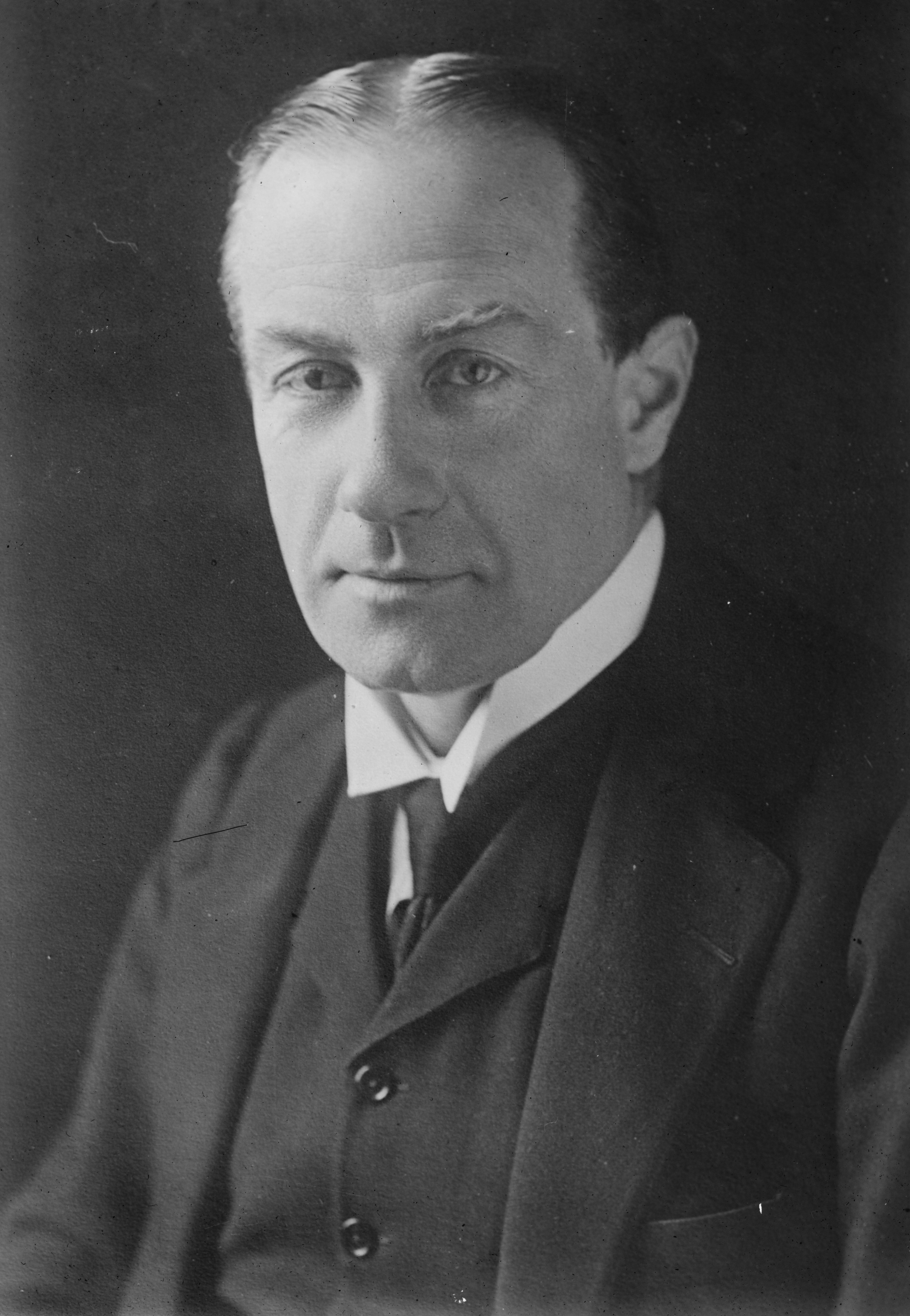

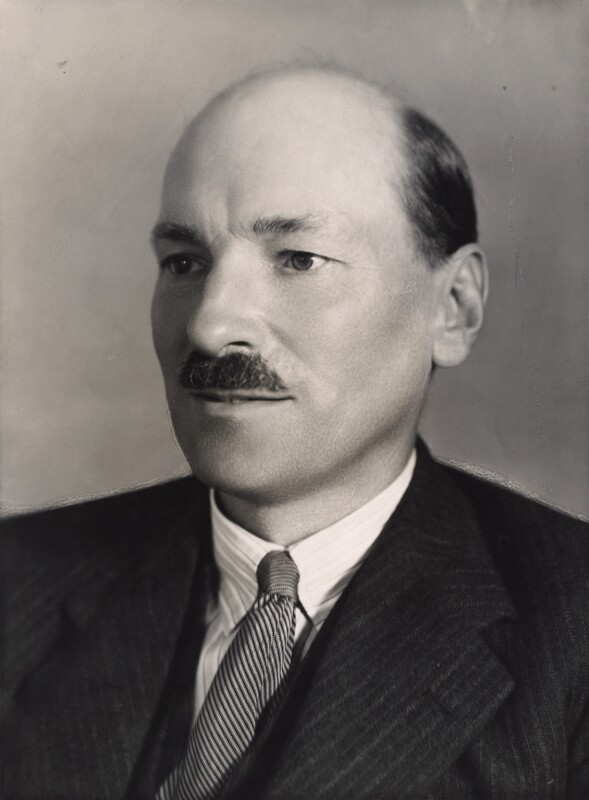

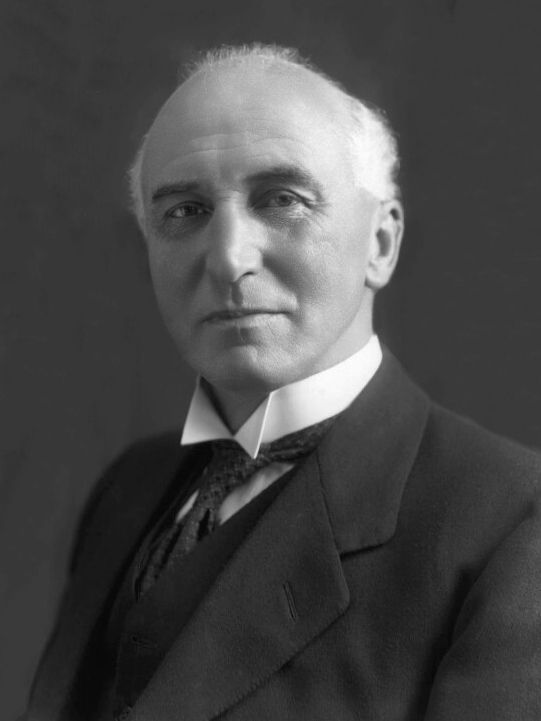

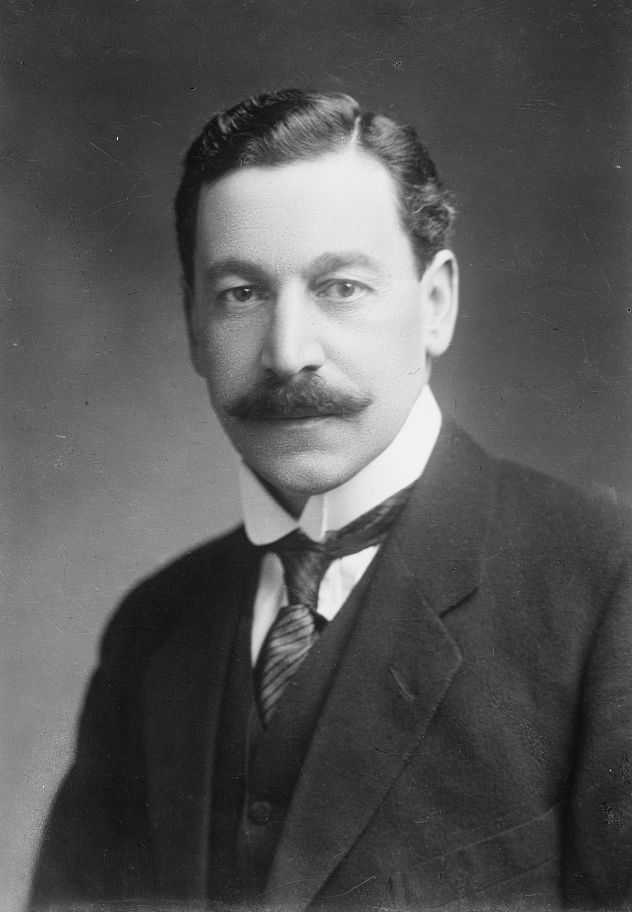

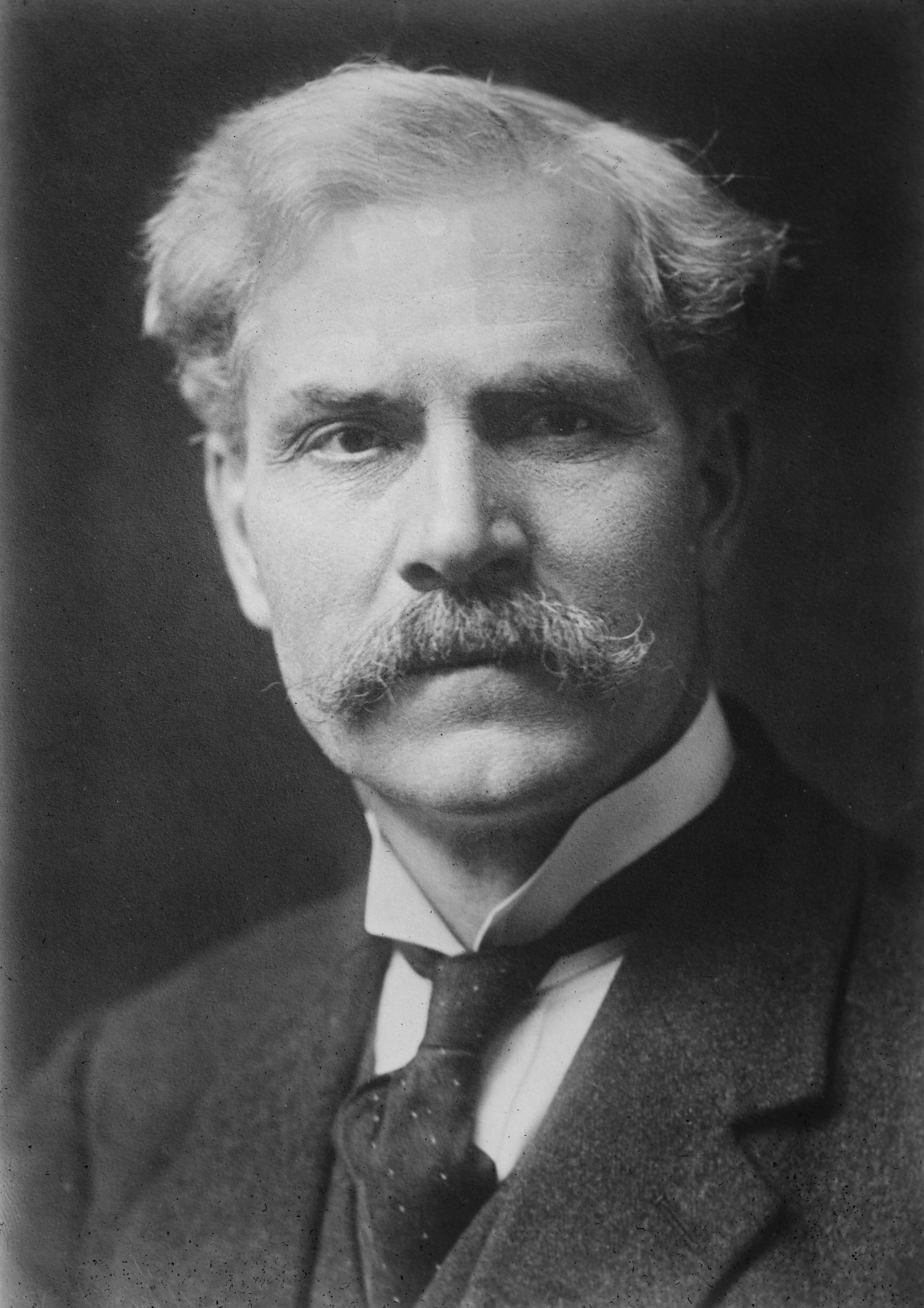
	First party	Second party	Third party
Leader	Stanley Baldwin	Clement Attlee	John Simon
Party	Conservative	Labour	Liberal National
Alliance	National Government		National Government
Leader since	23 May 1923	25 October 1935	5 October 1931
Leader's seat	Bewdley	Limehouse	Spen Valley
Last election	403 seats, (Note: Combined results for county, borough and university seats.) 57.8%	29 seats, 30.2% (Note: Figure is for all English candidates in the Labour Opposition in 1931)	23 seats, 3.4%
Seats won	333 (Note: Figure includes Speaker of the House of Commons Edward FitzRoy in Daventry.)	116	22
Seat change	▼70	▲87	▼1
Popular vote	8,997,348 (Note: Total and percentage votes given here are for territorial constituencies only.)	7,054,050	673,597
Percentage	49.4%	38.5%	3.4%
Swing	▼8.4 pp	▲8.3 pp	Steady
	Fourth party	Fifth party
Leader	Herbert Samuel	Ramsay MacDonald
Party	Liberal	National Labour
Alliance		National Government
Leader since	4 November 1931	24 August 1931
Leader's seat	Darwen	Seaham (lost seat)
Last election	19 seats, 5.8%	11 seats, 1.5
Seats won	11	6
Seat change	▼8	▼5
Popular vote	1,108,971	303,742
Percentage	6.3%	1.6%
Swing	▲0.5 pp	▲0.1

On Thursday 14 November 1935, the 1935 United Kingdom general election was held in England, to elect all 615 members of the House of Commons, with 492 constituencies being in England. 485 seats represented territorial constituencies contested under the first past the post electoral system, and seven additional seats represented the university constituencies. Three university constituencies returned two members through the single transferable vote electoral system and one returned one member by the first past the post system.

When combined with results from across the United Kingdom, the election resulted in a second landslide victory for the three-party National Government, which was led by Stanley Baldwin of the Conservative Party after the resignation of Ramsay MacDonald due to ill health earlier in the year. It is the most recent general election in United Kingdom to have seen any party or alliance of parties win a majority of the popular vote.

This was the last election during the reign of King George V, who died in 1936. Due to the outbreak of the Second World War in 1939, the next general election was not held until 1945.

== Candidates ==
Below is a table summarising the candidates of the 1935 general election in England, excluding those in the university constituencies.

Affiliation	Candidates
Labour Party	452 (Note: Includes 17 Co-operative Party candidates, as part of the Labour-Co-op alliance.)
Conservative and Unionist Party	423
Liberal Party	132
Liberal National Party	31
National Labour Organisation	18
Independent Labour Party	5
Independent Conservative	2 (Note: The candidates that stood were Linton Thorp in Nelson and Colne and James Lockwood in Shipley.)
Independent	2 (Note: The candidates that stood were Walter George Bagnall in Colne Valley and Violet Van der Elst in Putney.)
National Dividend	2 (Note: The candidates that stood were HC Bell in Birmingham Erdington and Reginald Kenney in Bradford North.)
National Independent	1 (Note: Candidate Austin Hopkinson stood in Mossley.)
Independent Labour	1 (Note: Candidate William Brown stood in Wolverhampton West.)
National	1 (Note: Candidate Charles Markham stood in Ilkeston.)
Liverpool Protestant Party	1 (Note: Candidate Harry Dixon Longbottom stood in Liverpool Kirkdale.)
Independent Progressive	1 (Note: Candidate Gerald Bailey stood in Aldershot.)
People's Peace	1 (Note: Candidate James Monteith Erskine stood in Farnworth.)
Social Credit Party	1 (Note: Candidate stood Wilfred Townend in Leeds South.)
Independent Liberal	1 (Note: Candidate Percy McDougall stood in Manchester Rusholme.)
Agricultural Defence League	1 (Note: Candidate George Pitt-Rivers stood in North Dorset.)
Christian Socialist	1 (Note: Candidate J. A. Harper stood in Walsall.)
Radical Reform	1 (Note: Candidate Thomas Disher stood in Camberwell North.)
Total	1,078

== Seat summary ==
Below is a table summarising the total number of seats, gains and losses for each party in both the territorial county and borough constituencies and the English university constituencies.

Party	Seats				
Party	Total	Gains	Losses	Net	Of all (%)
National Government (Total)	361	7	87	▼80	72.9
Conservative	333	3	73	▼70	67.3
Liberal National	22	3	4	▼1	4.4
National Labour	6	1	6	▼5	1.2
National	0	0	4	▼4	—
Labour	116	87	0	▲87	23.4
Liberal	11	3	11	▼8	2.2
National Independent	2	0	0	Steady	0.4
Independent	2	1	0	▲1	0.4
Total	492				

== County and borough constituency results ==
Below is a table summarising the constituency results of the 1935 general election in England, excluding the result in the university constituencies.

The seat and vote share change for the National Government coalition reflects on the parties that remained part of it in the election, and does not include the Liberal Party's change in seats and vote share or the outcome of the party leaving the National Government in 1932 and going into complete opposition in 1933.

Party	Seats					Aggregate votes		
Party	Total	Gains	Losses	Net	Of all (%)	Total	Of all (%) (Note: Adjusted for multi-member constituencies.)	Change (%)
National Government (Total)	357	7	86	▼79	73.6	9,987,937	54.5	▼8.8
Conservative	329 (Note: Figure includes Speaker of the House of Commons Edward FitzRoy in Daventry.)	3	72	▼69	67.8	8,997,348	49.4	▼8.4
Liberal National	22	3	4	▼1	4.5	673,597	3.4	Steady
National Labour	6	1 (Note: Harold Nicolson in Leicester West.)	6	▼5	1.2	303,742	1.6	▲0.1
National	0	0	4 (Note: Gordon Campbell in Burnley, William Allen in Burslem and Ian Horobin in Southwark Central. William Craven-Ellis in Southampton was re-elected, but as an official Conservative Party candidate.)	▼4	0.2	13,250	0.1	▼0.5
Labour	116	87	0	▲87	23.9	7,054,050	38.5	▲8 .3
Liberal	11	3	11	▼8	2.3	1,108,971	6.3	▲0.5
Ind. Conservative	0	Did not stand in 1931			—	27,721	0.2	—N/a
National Independent	1 (Note: Austin Hopkinson in Mossley.)	0	0	Steady	0.2	24,569	0.1	Steady
Ind. Labour Party	0	Newly independent			—	18,681	0.1	—N/a
Independent Labour	0	0	0	Steady	—	14,867	0.1	Steady
National Dividend	0	New			—	6,734	0.0	New
Liverpool Protestant	0	0	0	Steady	—	6,677	0.0	Steady
Independent Progressive	0	New			—	6,421	0.0	New
People's Peace	0	New			—	3,763	0.0	New
Social Credit	0	New			—	3,642	0.0	New
Independent	0	0	0	Steady	—	2,775	0.0	Steady
Independent Liberal	0	0	0	Steady	—	2,525	0.0	Steady
Agricultural Defence	0	New			—	1,771	0.0	New
Christian Socialist	0	New			—	1,480	0.0	New
Radical Reform	0	New			—	451	0.0	New
Total	485			0	100.0	18,273,035	100.0	0.0
Registered voters, and turnout						24,806,777 (Note: Electorate in contested constituencies. The total electorate was 25,618,571.)	70.7	▼5.4

=== Popular vote ===
Popular vote
Conservative	49.4%
Labour	38.5%
Liberal	6.3%
Liberal National	3.4%
National Labour	1.6%
National	0.1%
Other	0.7%

Popular vote (coalitions)
National Gov.	54.5%
Labour	38.5%
Liberal	6.3%
Other	0.7%

=== Parliament seats ===
Parliament seats
Conservative	67.8%
Labour	23.9%
Liberal National	4.5%
Liberal	2.3%
National Labour	1.2%
Other	0.2%

Parliament seats (coalitions)
National Gov.	73.6%
Labour	23.9%
Liberal	2.3%
Other	0.2%

== University constituency results ==
=== University results summary ===
Below is a table summarising the seats and vote share of the English university constituencies in the 1935 general election.

Party	Seats				First preference votes	
Party	Total	Gains	Losses	Net	Total	Of all (%)
National Government (Total)	4	0	1	▼1	23,687	51.4
Conservative	4	0	1	▼1	23,687	51.4
Liberal National	0	Did not stand			0	0.0
National Labour	0	Did not stand			0	0.0
National	0	Did not stand			0	0.0
Independent	2	1	0	▲1	3,390	7.4
National Independent	1	0	0	Steady	8,958	19.4
Labour Party	0	New			10,054	21.8
Total	7				46,089	

=== Cambridge University ===
See also: Cambridge University (constituency)

The constituency for Cambridge University returned two Members of Parliament using the single transferable vote electoral system. The electorate consisted of graduates of the university.

General Election 1935: Oxford University (2 seats)
Party	Candidate	FPv%	Count
Party	Candidate	FPv%	1
Conservative	John Withers	42.30	7,602
Conservative	Kenneth Pickthorn	38.49	6,917
Labour	Lionel Elvin	19.21	3,453
Electorate: 33,617 Valid: 17,972 Quota: 5,991 Turnout: 53.46%

=== Combined English Universities ===
See also: Combined English Universities

The Combined English Universities constituency, which represented effectively all red brick universities and Durham University, returned two Members of Parliament using the single transferable vote electoral system. The electorate consisted of graduates of the university.

General election 1935: Combined English Universities (2 seats)
Party	Candidate	Votes	%	±%
Conservative	Reginald Craddock	Unopposed	N/A	N/A
Independent	Eleanor Rathbone	Unopposed	N/A	N/A

=== London University ===
See also: London University (constituency)

The constituency for London University returned one Member of Parliament using the First-past-the-post electoral system. The electorate consisted of graduates of the university.

General election 1935: London University
Party	Candidate	Votes	%	±%
National Independent	Ernest Graham-Little	8,958	69.57	−3.40
Labour	Norman Angell	3,918	30.43	New
Majority		5,040	39.14	−6.80
Turnout		12,876	71.74	+1.47
Registered electors		17,949		
National Independent hold		Swing		

=== Oxford University ===
See also: Oxford University (constituency)

The constituency for Oxford University returned two Members of Parliament using the single transferable vote electoral system. The electorate consisted of graduates of the university.

General Election 1935: Oxford University (2 seats)
Party	Candidate	FPv%	Count		
Party	Candidate	FPv%	1	2	3
Conservative	Lord Hugh Cecil	48.32	7,365		
Independent	A. P. Herbert	22.24	3,390	3,864	5,206
Conservative	C. R. M. F. Cruttwell	11.83	1,803	3,520	3,697
Labour	J. L. Stocks	17.60	2,683	2,776	eliminated
Electorate: 22,413 Valid: 15,241 Quota: 5,081 Turnout: 68.00%

== See also ==
- 1935 United Kingdom general election in Scotland
- 1935 United Kingdom general election in Wales
- 1935 United Kingdom general election in Northern Ireland
