= Queen's University of Belfast (UK Parliament constituency) =

1918–1950 UK parliamentary constituency in Northern Ireland

Queen's University, Belfast
- Former university constituency for the House of Commons

1918–1950
- Seats: 1

Queen's University of Belfast was a university constituency represented in the House of Commons of the United Kingdom Parliament from the 1918 general election until 1950 general election.

It returned one Member of Parliament (MP) elected by the first-past-the-post voting system.

== Franchise ==
The MP was elected by the graduates of Queen's University Belfast; male graduates aged over 21 and female graduates aged over 30 were eligible to vote in this constituency.

== History ==
University constituencies had existed in the United Kingdom Parliament and its predecessors since 1603 and in 1918 Queen's was enfranchised as such. When the Parliament of Northern Ireland was established, the same franchise was preserved - see Queen's University of Belfast (Northern Ireland Parliament constituency).

After the 1918 election, Sinn Féin invited all those elected for constituencies in Ireland to sit as TDs in Dáil Éireann rather than in the House of Commons of the United Kingdom. All those elected for Irish constituencies were included in the roll of the Dáil but only those elected for Sinn Féin sat in the First Dáil. In May 1921, the Dáil passed a resolution declaring that elections to the House of Commons of Northern Ireland and the House of Commons of Southern Ireland would be used as the election for the Second Dáil and that the First Dáil would be dissolved on the assembly of the new body. The graduates of Queen's would then have been represented in the Dáil by the four-seat constituency of Queen's University of Belfast, which also returned no representatives for Sinn Féin.

As with most other Northern Ireland seats in this period, the electorate was heavily inclined towards the Ulster Unionists, with no contests for the Westminster seat taking place at all in the interwar years.

Under the Representation of the People Act 1948, university constituencies at Westminster were abolished with effect at the 1950 general election.

== Members of Parliament ==
Election	Member	Party
1918	William Whitla	Ulster Unionist
1923	Thomas Sinclair	Ulster Unionist
1940 by-election	Douglas Savory	Ulster Unionist
1950	constituency abolished	

== Election results ==
1918 general election: Queen's University of Belfast
Party	Candidate	Votes	%	±%
UUP	William Whitla	1,487	92.65	
Sinn Féin	Sean B. Dolan	118	7.35	
Majority		1,369	85.30	
Turnout		1,605	78.72	
UUP win (new seat)				

1922 general election: Queen's University of Belfast
Party	Candidate	Votes	%	±%
UUP	William Whitla	Unopposed		
UUP hold				

1923 general election: Queen's University of Belfast
Party	Candidate	Votes	%	±%
UUP	Thomas Sinclair	Unopposed		
UUP hold				

1924 general election: Queen's University of Belfast
Party	Candidate	Votes	%	±%
UUP	Thomas Sinclair	Unopposed		
UUP hold				

1929 general election: Queen's University of Belfast
Party	Candidate	Votes	%	±%
UUP	Thomas Sinclair	Unopposed		
UUP hold				

1931 general election: Queen's University of Belfast
Party	Candidate	Votes	%	±%
UUP	Thomas Sinclair	Unopposed		
UUP hold				

1935 general election: Queen's University of Belfast
Party	Candidate	Votes	%	±%
UUP	Thomas Sinclair	Unopposed		
UUP hold				

Resignation of Sinclair

Queen's University of Belfast by-election, 2 November 1940
Party	Candidate	Votes	%	±%
UUP	Douglas Savory	Unopposed		
UUP hold				

1945 general election: Queen's University of Belfast
Party	Candidate	Votes	%	±%
UUP	Douglas Savory	1,923	72.5	N/A
Independent	Thomas Cusack	728	27.5	New
Majority		1,195	45.0	N/A
Turnout		2,651	51.6	N/A
UUP hold				

== Sources ==
- Walker, Brian M., ed. (1978). Parliamentary Election Results in Ireland, 1801–1922. Royal Irish Academy. ISBN 0-901714-12-7.
- Walker, Brian M., ed. (1992). Parliamentary election results in Ireland, 1918–1992. Royal Irish Academy. ISBN 0-901714-96-8.
