= 1935 United Kingdom general election in Wales =

- 14 November 1935

All 36 Welsh seats to the House of Commons
- Turnout: 76.4% (▼2.9 pp)
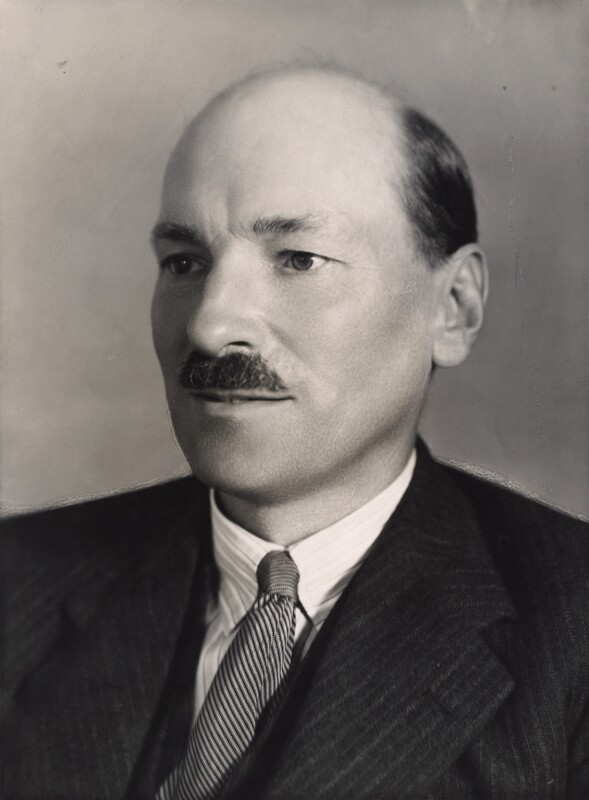

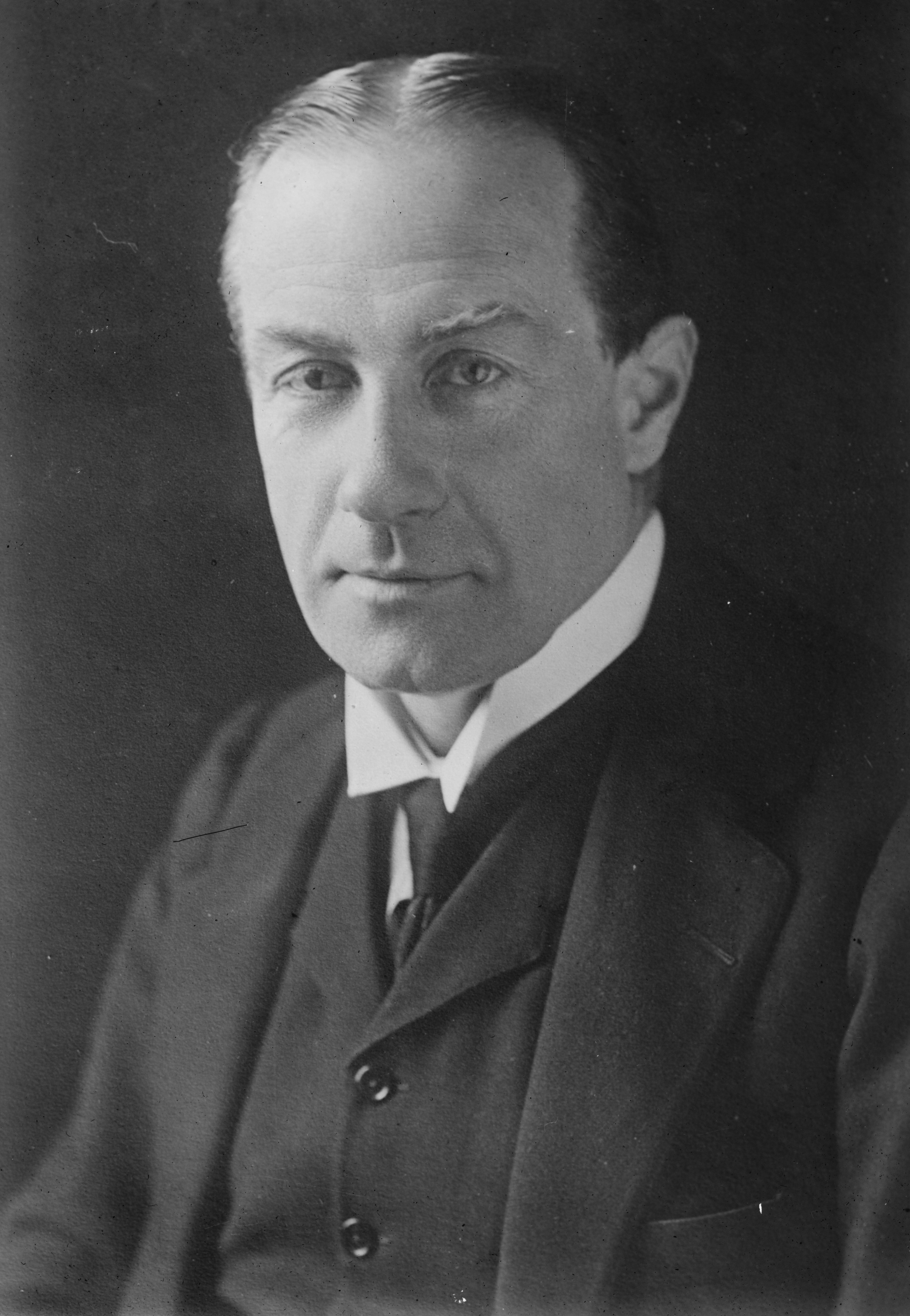

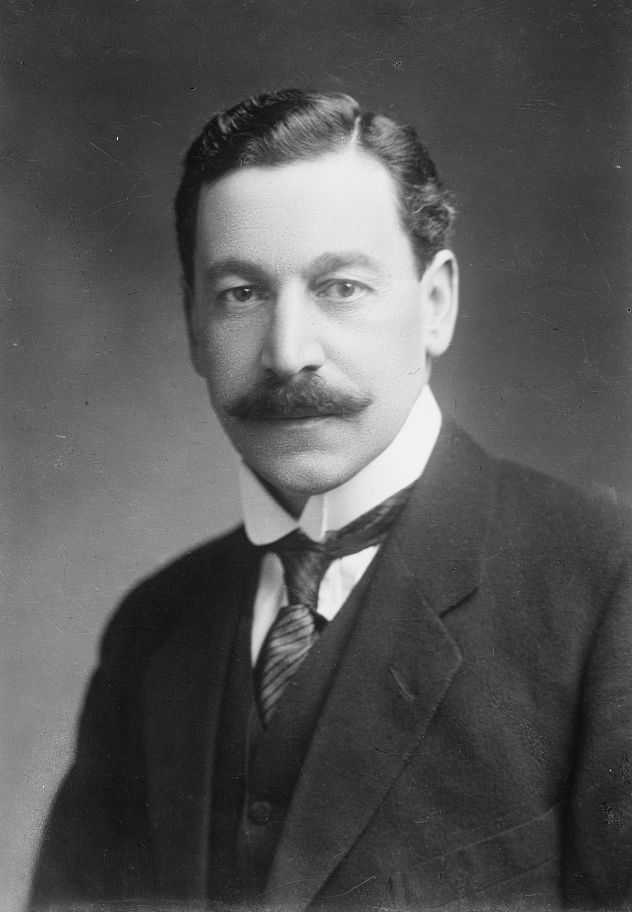

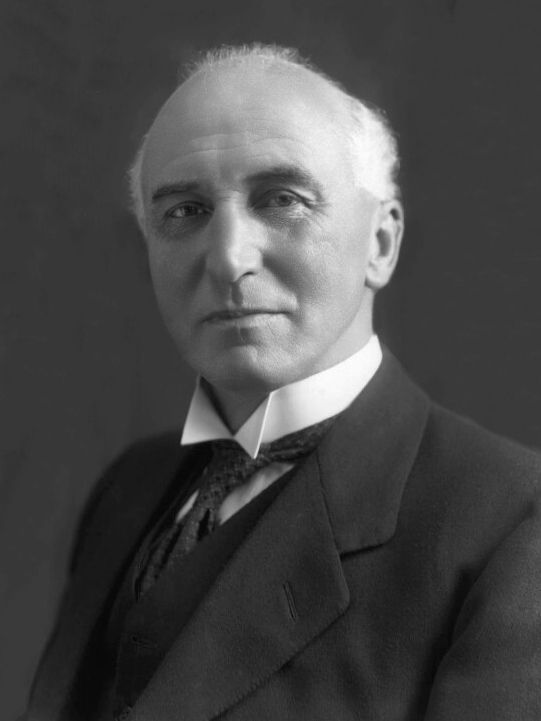

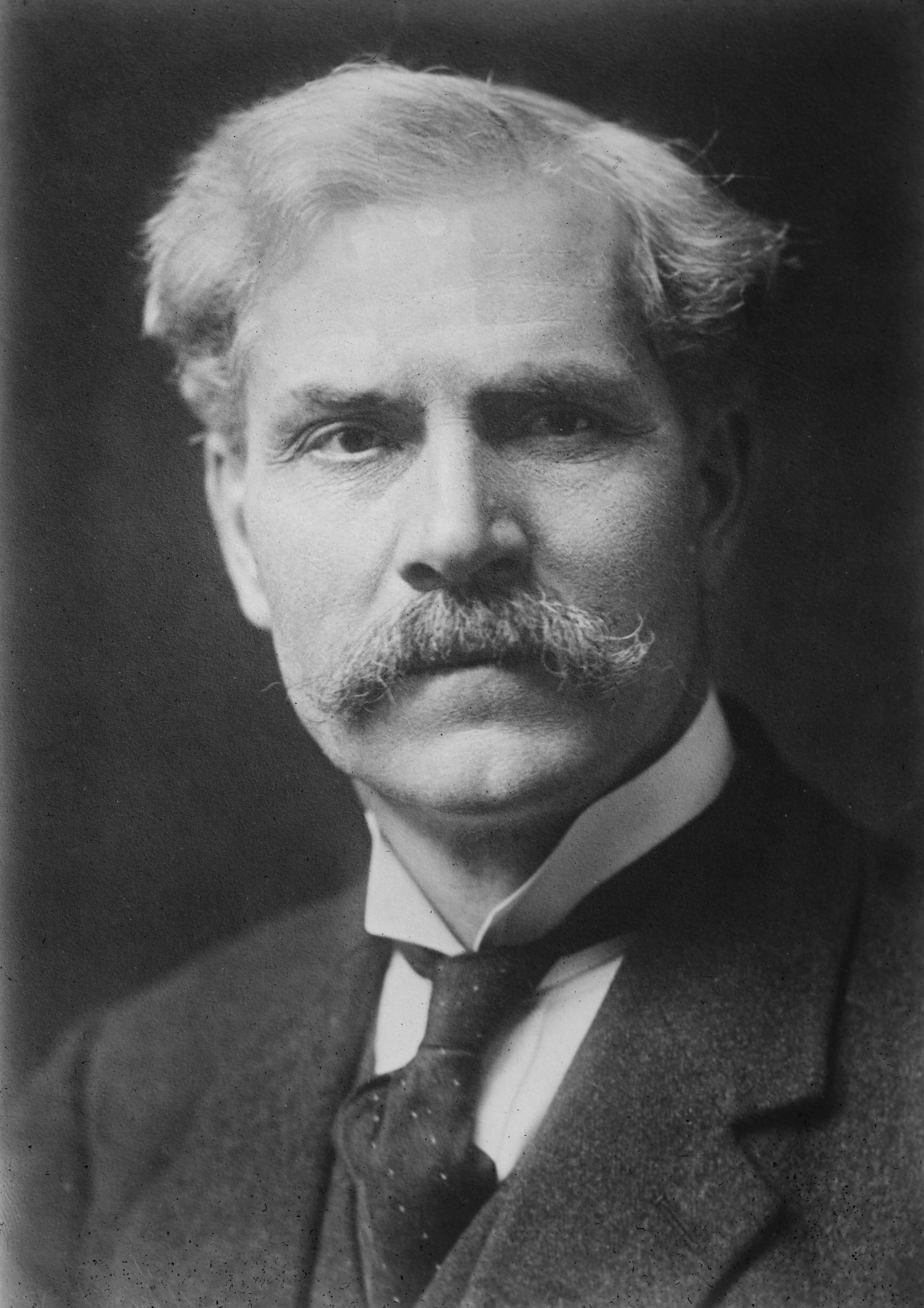
	First party	Second party	Third party
Leader	Clement Attlee	Stanley Baldwin	Herbert Samuel
Party	Labour	Conservative	Liberal
Alliance		National Government
Leader since	25 October 1935	23 May 1923	4 November 1931
Leader's seat	Limehouse	Bewdley	Darwen (lost seat)
Last election	16 seats, (Note: Combined results for county, borough and university seats.) 44.1% (Note: Figure is for all Welsh candidates in the Labour Opposition in 1931)	6 seats, 22.1%	9 seats, 21.1% (Note: The seat total and vote share represent the combined seat count and vote share of the reunited Liberal Party in Wales following the Independent Liberals rejoining the party in 1935 within a month after the 1935 United Kingdom general election.)
Seats won	18	6	7
Seat change	▲2	Steady	▼2
Popular vote	395,830 (Note: Total and percentage votes given here are for territorial constituencies only.)	204,099	157,091
Percentage	45.4%	23.4	18.0%
Swing	▲3.6 pp	▲1.3 pp	▼3.1 pp
	Fourth party	Fifth party
Leader	John Simon	Ramsay MacDonald
Party	Liberal National	National Labour
Alliance	National Government	National Government
Leader since	5 October 1931	24 August 1931
Leader's seat	Spen Valley	Seaham (lost seat)
Last election	4 Seats, 7.0%	1 seat, 2.2%
Seats won	3	1
Seat change	▼1	Steady
Popular vote	36,156 (Note: Clement Davies in Montgomeryshire ran unopposed.)	16,954
Percentage	4.1	1.9%
Swing	▼2.9 pp	▼0.3 pp

On Thursday 14 November 1935, the 1935 United Kingdom general election was held in Wales, to elect all 615 members of the House of Commons, with 36 constituencies being in Wales. 35 seats represented territorial constituencies contested under the first past the post electoral system, and one additional seat represented the University of Wales which was also contested under the first past the post electoral system.

When combined with results from across the United Kingdom, the election resulted in a second landslide victory for the three-party National Government, which was led by Stanley Baldwin of the Conservative Party after the resignation of Ramsay MacDonald due to ill health earlier in the year. It is the most recent general election in United Kingdom to have seen any party or alliance of parties win a majority of the popular vote.

This was the last election during the reign of King George V, who died in 1936. Due to the outbreak of the Second World War in 1939, the next general election was not held until 1945.

== Candidates ==
Below is a table summarising the candidates of the 1935 general election in Wales, excluding those in the University of Wales constituency.

Affiliation	Candidates
Labour Party	33
Conservative and Unionist Party	14
Liberal Party	12 (Note: Includes those in the Independent Liberals. The Independent Liberals group candidates that stood were Megan Lloyd George in Anglesey, Goronwy Owen in Caernarvonshire, Leader of the Independent Liberals David Lloyd George in Caernarvon Boroughs and Gwilym Lloyd George in Pembrokeshire.)
Liberal National Party	3 (Note: The candidates that stood were Henry Morris-Jones in Denbigh, Clement Davies in Montgomeryshire and Lewis Jones in Swansea West.)
National	2 (Note: The candidates that stood were Ivor Guest in Brecon and Radnorshire and G C Hutchinson in Gower.)
National Labour Organisation	1 (Note: Candidate Ernest Bennett stood in Cardiff Central.)
Communist Party of Great Britain	1 (Note: Harry Pollitt, the General Secretary of the Communist Party of Great Britain, contested the seat of Rhondda East. The election in 1935 was the first of three times Pollitt would unsuccessfully run in the seat, going on to run again in 1945 and 1950.)
Independent Labour Party	1 (Note: Candidate Claude Stanfield stood in Merthyr.)
Plaid Cymru	1 (Note: Canidate John Edward Daniel stood in Caernarvonshire.)
Total	68

== Analysis ==
=== National Government ===
Although the National Government retained its position as the Government of the United Kingdom following the election, Labour increased its seat count primarily at the expense of the Liberal Party in Wales.

The Conservative Party, the largest party in the National Government, gained the seat of Flintshire from the Liberal National Party. This was due to the Liberal Nationals not standing a candidate in the seat. The sitting Member of Parliament Frederick Llewellyn-Jones, who had been elected as part of the Liberal National Party but then subsequently defected to the Liberal Party in 1932, stood down from the election. The Liberal Nationals otherwise retained its seats in Denbigh, Montgomeryshire and Swansea West, but had a reduce vote share. Clement Davies in Montgomeryshire once again ran unopposed. Additionally, the only National Labour Member of Parliament in Wales Ernest Bennett retained Cardiff Central with a reduced vote share.

The Conservatives did not stand in the seat of Brecon and Radnorshire, leaving National candidate Ivor Guest under the National Government coalition to win the seat. Another National candidate, who ran in Gower, was unsuccessful. The gain in Brecon and Radnorshire represented a loss in terms of seats from the Conservatives compared to the previous election. Overall, there was no change seat count for the Conservative Party or the National Government coalition in Wales as a whole.

=== Labour and Independent Labour ===
The Labour Party gained Wrexham and Carmarthen from the Liberal Party. The party also retained Merthyr which it had won from the Independent Labour Party in the 1934 Merthyr by-election after the death of R. C. Wallhead. Wallhead remained part of the Labour Party despite his membership of the Independent Labour Party. Before his death, however, Wallhead resigned from the Independent Labour Party and rejoined the Labour in 1933. Overall, the Labour Party gained two seats at this election, holding 18 seats.

Nevertheless, this was the first general election in the United Kingdom since 1985 in which the Independent Labour Party stood candidates separately from the Labour Party itself. The Independent Labour Party disaffiliated itself from Labour in 1932 and ran a candidate; however, its candidate Claude Stanfield running in Merthyr was unsuccessful.

=== Liberals and Independent Liberals ===
Due to the policy caused by the government negotiating the Ottawa Accords, the Liberal Party left the National Government in 1932. The party then went from supporting the National Government to going into full opposition in 1933.

The four Independent Liberals, led by former Prime Minister David Lloyd George, stood and retained their constituencies in Wales. These were Caernarvon Boroughs, Anglesey, Pembrokeshire and Caernarvonshire. The four candidates in the group did not stand as Liberal Party candidates, despite the Liberal Party having fully left the National Government, where the Liberal Party's decision under Herbert Samuel to be a member of the coalition had been the reason for the creation of the group in 1931. However, the Independent Liberals would go onto rejoin the Liberal Party the month following the election, and participated in the election of Archibald Sinclair as the new Leader of the Liberal Party following Samuel losing his seat in this election.

As the Liberal Party itself retained its seat in the University of Wales constituency but lost its seats in Carmarthen and Wrexham, the party was left with only three seats in Wales, and therefore had fewer than Lloyd George's group.

== County and borough constituency results ==
Below is a table summarising the constituency results of the 1935 general election in Wales, excluding the result in the University of Wales constituency.

The seat and vote share change for the National Government coalition reflects on the parties that remained part of it in the election, and does not include the Liberal Party's change in seats and vote share or the outcome of the party leaving the National Government in 1932 and going into complete opposition in 1933.

Party	Seats					Aggregate votes		
Party	Total	Gains	Losses	Net	Of total (%)	Total	Of total (%)	Change (%)
Labour	18	2	0	▲2	51.4	395,830	45.4	▲3.6
National Government (Total)	11	2	2	Steady	31.4	292,527	33.6	▲2.3
Conservative	6	1	1	Steady	17.1	204,099	23.4	▲1.3
Liberal National	3	0	1	▼1	8.6	36,156	4.1	▼2.9
National	1 (Note: Ivor Guest in Brecon and Radnorshire.)	New		▲1	2.9	35,318	4.1	New
National Labour	1	0	0	Steady	2.9	16,954	1.9	▼0.3
Liberal	6 (Note: Includes 4 Independent Liberals MPs.)	0	2	▼2	17.1 (Note: Includes 11.4% for the Independent Liberals.)	157,091 (Note: Includes 65,128 for the Independent Liberals.)	18.0 (Note: Includes 7.5% for the Independent Liberals.)	▼3.1 (Note: Includes ▲0.9% for the Independent Liberals.)
Communist	0	0	0	Steady	—	13,655	1.6	Steady
Ind. Labour Party	0	Newly independent			—	9,640	1.1	—N/a
Plaid Cymru	0	0	0	Steady	—	2,534	0.3	▲0.2
Total	35			0	100.0	871,277	100.0	0.0
Registered voters, and turnout						1,140,155 (Note: Electorate in contested constituencies. The total electorate was 1,669,793.)	76.4	▼2.9

=== Popular vote ===
Popular vote
Labour	45.4%
Conservative	23.4%
Liberal	18.0%
Liberal National	4.1%
National	4.1%
National Labour	1.9%
Plaid Cymru	0.3%
Other	2.7%

Popular vote (coalitions)
Labour	45.4%
National Gov.	33.6%
Ind. Liberals	18.0%
Plaid Cymru	0.3%
Other	2.7%

=== Parliament seats ===
Parliament seats
Labour	51.4%
Conservative	17.1%
Liberal	17.1%
Liberal National	8.6%
National Labour	2.9%
National	2.9%

Parliament seats (coalitions)
Labour	51.4%
National Gov.	31.4%
Liberal	17.1%

== University of Wales result ==
Below is a table summarising the 1935 constituency results for seat of the University of Wales constituency. The Liberal Party retained the seat, bringing the total seats of the Liberal Party to three out of the possible 36.

General election 1935: University of Wales
Party	Candidate	Votes	%	±%
Liberal	Ernest Evans	2,796	61.3	−14.1
Labour	Ithel Davies	1,768	38.7	New
Majority		1,028	22.6	−28.2
Turnout		4,564	62.3	+0.9
Liberal hold		Swing		

== See also ==
- 1935 United Kingdom general election in England
- 1935 United Kingdom general election in Scotland
- 1935 United Kingdom general election in Northern Ireland
- List of MPs for constituencies in Wales (1935–1945)
