= 1935 United Kingdom general election in Scotland =

- 14 November 1935

All 74 Scottish seats to the House of Commons
- Turnout: 72.6% (▼4.8 pp)
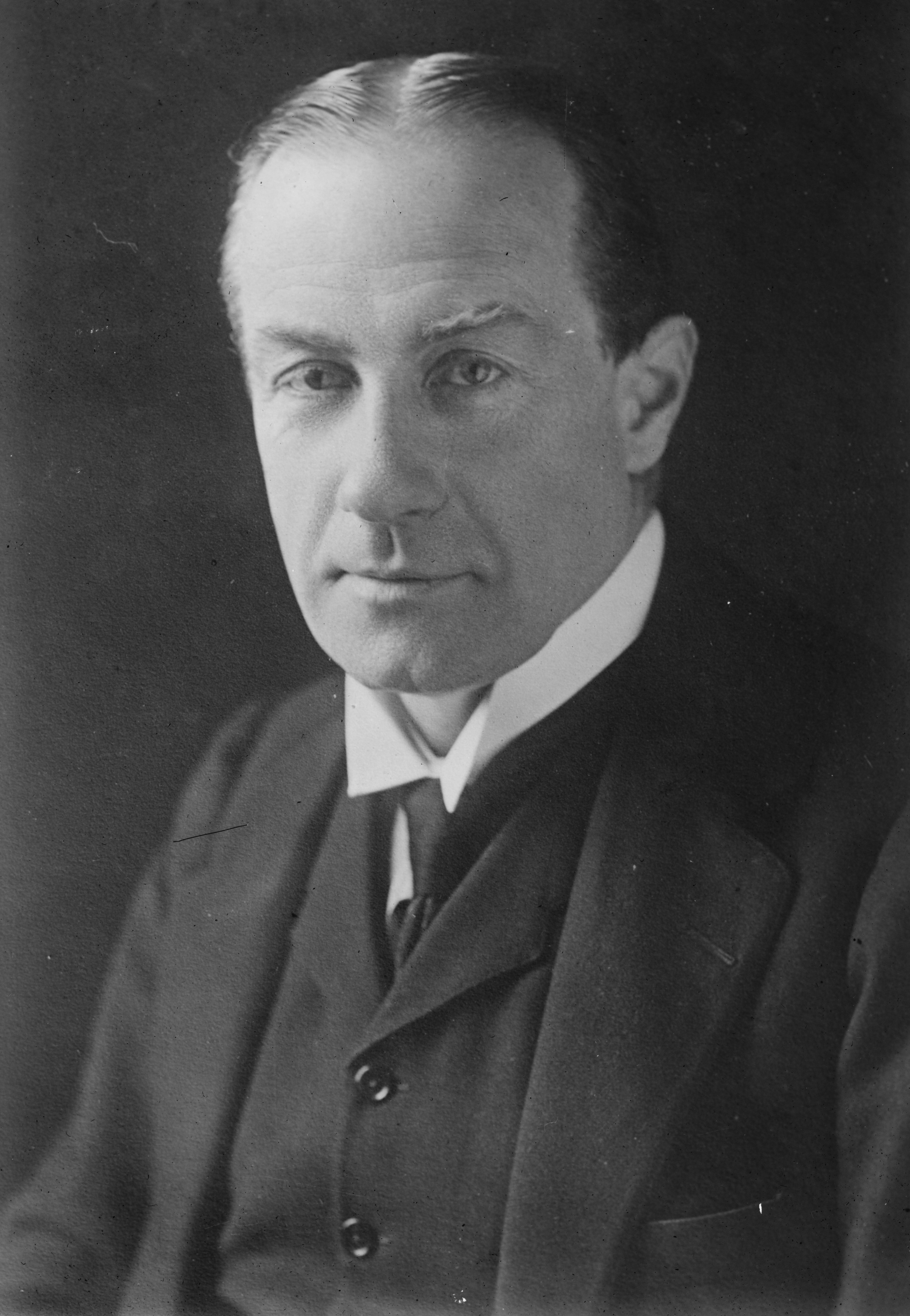

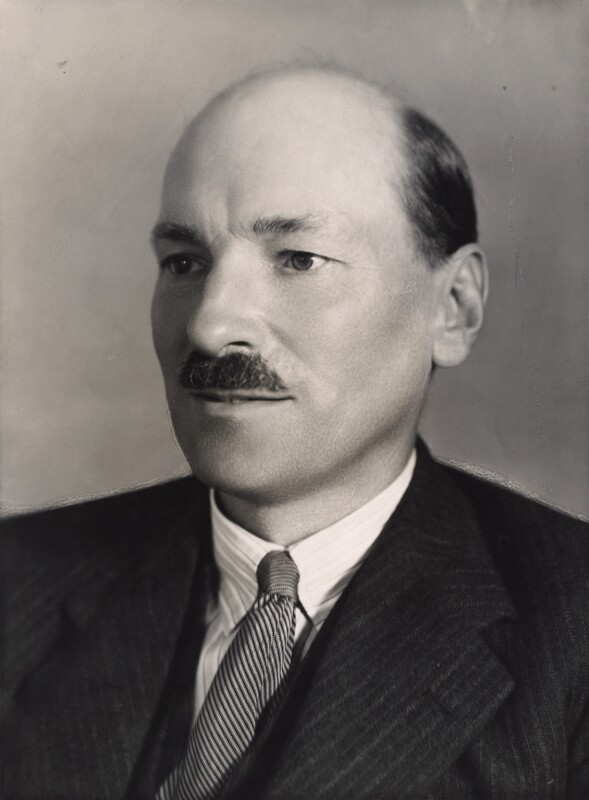

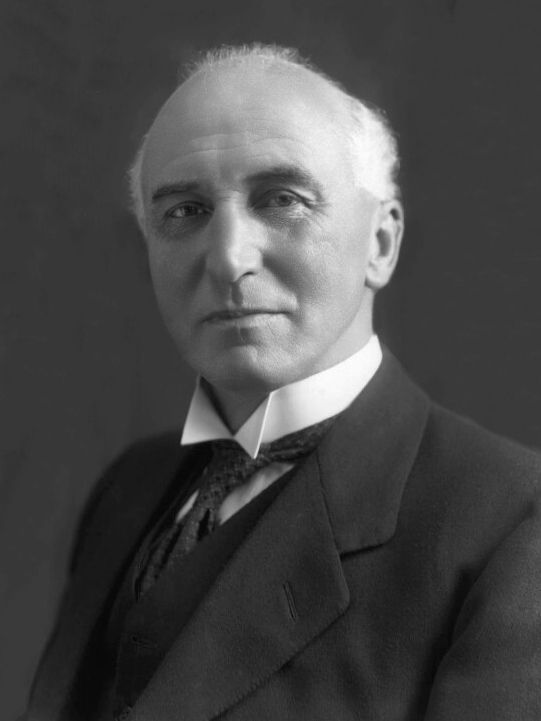

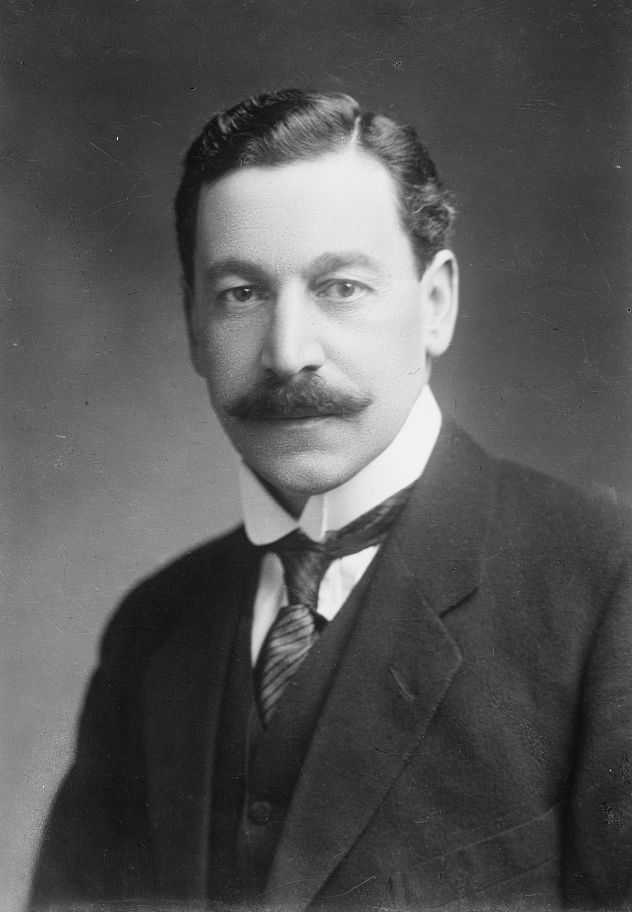

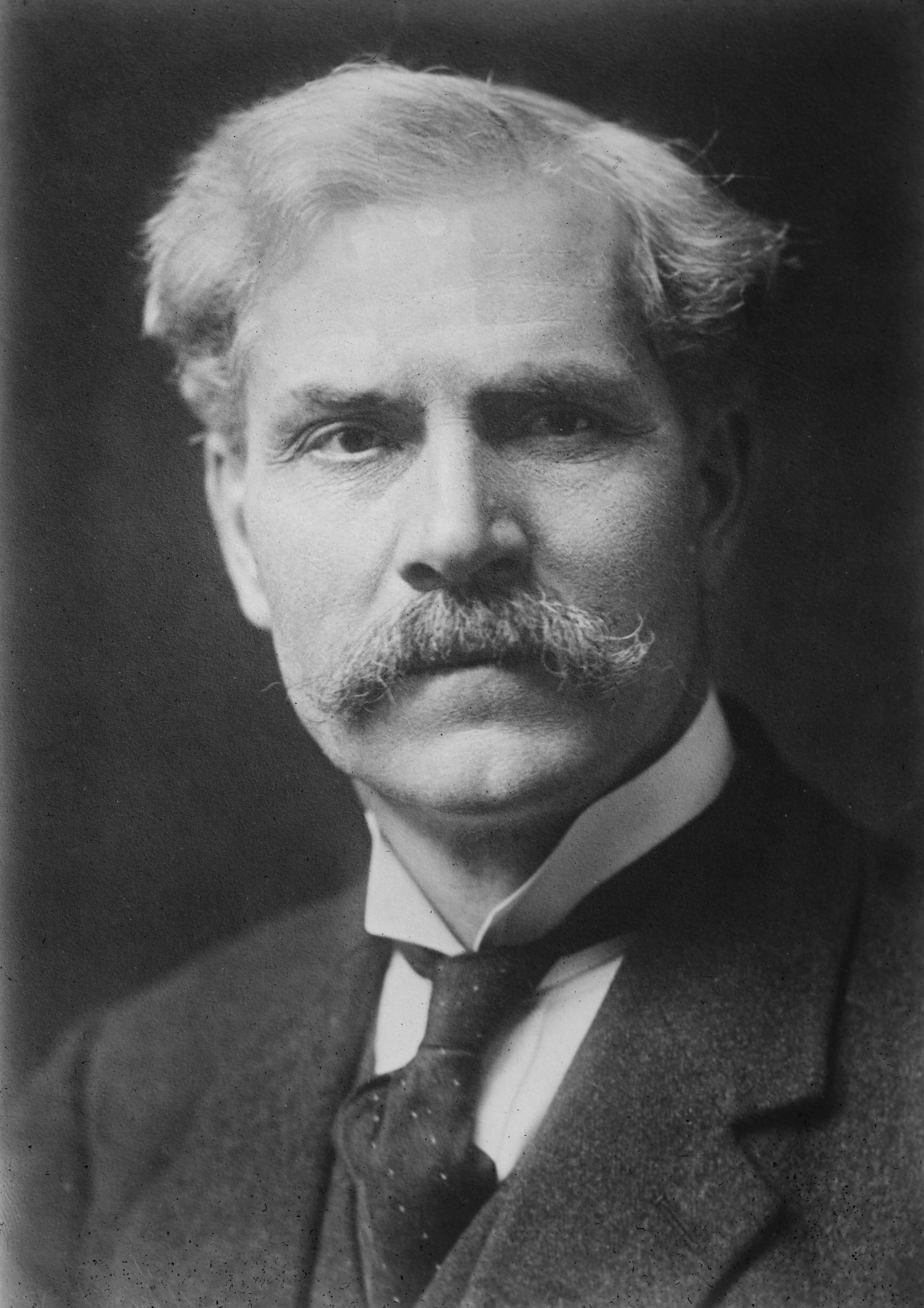
	First party	Second party	Third party
Leader	Stanley Baldwin	Clement Attlee	John Simon
Party	Unionist	Labour	National Liberal
Alliance	Conservative & National Government		National Government
Leader since	23 May 1923	25 October 1935	5 October 1931
Leader's seat	Bewdley	Limehouse	Spen Valley
Last election	50 seats, (Note: Combined results for burgh, county and university seats) 49.5	7 seats, 32.6% (Note: Figure is for all Scottish candidates in the Labour Opposition in 1931)	8 seats, 4.9%
Seats won	37	20	8
Seat change	▼13	▲13	Steady
Popular vote	962,595 (Note: Total and percentage votes given here are for territorial constituencies only)	863,789	149,072
Percentage	42.0%	36.8%	6.7%
Swing	▼7.5 pp	▲4.2 pp	▲1.8 pp
	Fourth party	Fifth party	Sixth party
Leader	James Maxton	Herbert Samuel	Ramsay MacDonald
Party	Ind. Labour Party	Liberal	National Labour
Alliance		Liberal	National Government
Leader since	1934	4 November 1931	24 August 1931
Leader's seat	Glasgow; Bridgeton	Darwen (lost seat)	Seaham (lost seat)
Last election	Stood with Labour	8 seats, 8.6%	1 seat, 1.0%
Seats won	4	3	1
Seat change	▲4	▼5	Steady
Popular vote	111,256	174,235	19,115
Percentage	5.0%	6.7%	0.9%
Swing	Newly independent	▼1.9 pp	▼0.1 pp

On Thursday 14 November 1935, the 1935 United Kingdom general election was held in Scotland, to elect all 615 members of the House of Commons, with 74 seats being in Scotland. 71 seats (32 burgh constituencies and 38 county constituencies) (Note: One burgh seat, Dundee, was represented by two members of parliament.) represented territorial constituencies. There was also one university constituency, which elected an additional 3 members using the Single Transferable Vote (STV) method.

When combined with results from across the United Kingdom, the election resulted in a second landslide victory for the three-party National Government, which was led by Stanley Baldwin of the Conservative Party after the resignation of Ramsay MacDonald due to ill health earlier in the year. It is the most recent general election in United Kingdom to have seen any party or alliance of parties win a majority of the popular vote. This election marked the tradition for general elections to be held on a Thursday, and every general election since has been held on this day.

This was also the last election during the reign of King George V, who died in 1936. Due to the outbreak of the Second World War in 1939, the next general election was not held until 1945.

== Candidates ==
Below is a table summarising the candidates of the 1935 general election in Scotland, excluding those in the Combined Scottish Universities constituency.

Affiliation	Candidates
Labour Party	69 (Note: Includes three Co-operative Party candidates, as part of the Labour-Co-op alliance.)
Unionist Party	58
Scottish Liberal Party	16
Independent Labour Party	11
Liberal National Party	9
Scottish National Party	7
Communist Party of Great Britain	1 (Note: Candidate Willie Gallacher stood in West Fife.)
National Labour Organisation	1 (Note: Candidate Kenneth Lindsay stood in Kilmarnock.)
National	1 (Note: Candidate William Bruce stood in Caithness and Sutherland.)
Total	167

== Analysis ==
=== National Government ===
In Scotland, the three parties forming the National Government collectively lost seats, predominantly to the Labour Party. The coalition, however, maintained its dominance in terms of seats at the election, holding a total of 46 collectively.

The Unionist Party, which was nationally affiliated with the Conservative Party, lost 15 seats in the election, 13 of which were won by Labour. However, the Unionists gained Orkney and Shetland, Banff from the Scottish Liberal Party, which had left the National Government coalition progressively throughout 1932 and 1933. Overall, the Unionists stood at 37 seats, including maintaining its two seats in the Combined Scottish Universities constituency, maintaining its position as the largest party by seats overall and within the National Government in Scotland.

The Liberal National Party contested nine seats at the election, where it had contested and won eight in 1931. The Liberal Nationals lost Dunfermline Burghs and Western Isles to the Labour Party. However, it gained Dumfriesshire from the Liberal Party, standing in the seat for the first time. Henry Fildes won the seat unopposed by the Liberal Party. The Liberal Nationals also won a seat in the Combined Scottish Universities constituency from the Liberal Party, where the Liberals again did not stand a candidate. Overall, the Liberal National seat count remained unchanged, although its vote share increased slightly.

Additionally, National Labour, also within the National Government, maintained its seat of Kilmarnock. Candidate Kenneth Lindsay won the seat, with the previous National Labour MP, Craigie Aitchison, retiring from Parliament.

=== Liberals ===
Due to the policy caused by the government negotiating the Ottawa Accords, the Scottish Liberal Party left the National Government in 1932. The party then went from supporting the National Government to going into full opposition in 1933. Nevertheless, the party suffered losses to the Unionists and Liberal National Party. However, the Liberals also lost Edinburgh East to the Labour Party. Overall, the Liberals were reduced to three seats, having lost a total of five in Scotland.

=== Labour and Independent Labour ===
The Labour Party had recovered significantly from its loss in Scotland and across the United Kingdom at this election. In Scotland, David Kirkwood, who had previously been elected at the last election sponsored by the Constituency Labour Party but without Labour endorsement, had re-contested and won his seat of Dumbarton Burghs as the official Labour candidate. This represented a gain for Labour. In addition to winning Edinburgh East from the Liberal Party and two seats from the Liberal National Party, it also won Aberdeen North, Stirling and Falkirk, Clackmannan and Eastern Stirlingshire, Stirlingshire West, Kirkcaldy Burghs, Maryhill, Motherwell, Bothwell, Coatbridge, Springburn, Tradeston, Ayrshire South and Linlithgow from the Conservatives. As such, the Labour Party gained 16 seats compared to the last election from its previous seven. It, however, lost three seats from sitting Independent Labour Party MPs as wells as another previously unendorsed Labour candidates. It held a total of 20 seats in Scotland following this election.

Independent Labour Party succeeded in winning four Scottish seats in its first outing as a standalone party. Previously affiliated to Labour, it had since the previous election been increasingly moved apart from them, ultimately dissociating from the party in March 1932. The ILP had dominated the Labour movement in Scotland since 1918, dominating community based activism, and essentially forming the Labour Party in Scotland. This had ultimately served to undermine the organisational growth of the Labour Party in Scotland.

The Independent Labour Party had previously held two seats at the election, when it was still affiliated of the Labour Party. These were James Maxton in Glasgow Bridgeton and John McGovern in Glasgow Shettleston re-contested and won their seats, standing as candidates for the party and not endorsed by the Labour party at the election. Additionally, George Buchanan, who had won Glasgow Gorbals in the last election under the sponsored by the Constituency Labour Party though also a member of the Independent Labour party, won his seat again at this election but as a candidate for the Independent Labour Party at this election. these three represented a gain from the such candidates in favour of the Independent Labour Party from the Labour Party at this election. Lastly, Campbell Stephen, who had unsuccessfully contended Glasgow Camlachie in 1931, won the seat as an Independent Labour Party candidate at this election from the Unionist Party.

=== Minor Parties ===
Finally, the Communist Party gained its first seat in ten years. Willie Gallacher, the only communist candidate in Scotland in this election and only one of two throughout the United Kingdom in 1935, won West Fife after having contesting it in the previous two elections. The win was from the Unionist Party.

The election was the first general election to be contested by the Scottish National Party, which had been a continuation of a merger between the National Party of Scotland (which had contested in previous elections, including in 1931) and the Scottish Party. Although its overall vote share increased when compared to the National Party of Scotland in the previous election, it did not win any seats.

== Seat summary ==
Below is a table summarising the total number of seats, gains and losses for each party in both the territorial county and burgh constituencies and the Combined Scottish Universities constituency.

Party	Seats				
Party	Total	Gains	Losses	Net	Of total (%)
National Government (Total)	46	4	17	▼13	62.2
Unionist	37	2	15	▼13	50.0
Liberal National	8	2	2	Steady	10.8
National Labour	1	0	0	Steady	1.4
National	0	New			—
Labour	20	16	3	▲13	27.0
Ind. Labour Party	4	Newly independent		▲4	5.4
Liberal	3	0	5	▼5	4.1
Communist	1	1	0	▲1	1.4
Total	74				

== County and burgh constituency results ==
Below is a table summarising the constituency results of the 1935 general election in Scotland, excluding the result in the Combined Scottish Universities constituency.

The seat and vote share change for the National Government coalition reflects on the parties that remained part of it in the election, and does not include the Liberal Party's change in seats and vote share or the outcome of the party leaving the National Government in 1932 and going into complete opposition in 1933.

Party	Seats					Aggregate votes		
Party	Total	Gains	Losses	Net	Of total (%)	Total	Of total (%) (Note: Adjusted for multi-member constituencies.)	Change (%)
National Government (Total)	43	3	17	▼14	60.6	1,135,403	49.8	▼5.6
Unionist	35	2	15	▼13	49.3	962,595	42.0	▼7.5
Liberal National	7	1 (Note: Henry Fildes in Dumfriesshire.)	2	▼1	9.9	149,072	6.7	▲1.8
National Labour	1	0	0	Steady	1.4	19,115	0.9	▼0.1
National	0	New			—	4,621	0.2	New
Labour	20	16	3 (Note: James Maxton in Glasgow Bridgeton, John McGovern in Glasgow Shettleston and George Buchanan in Glasgow Gorbals leaving Labour after the disaffiliation of the Independent Labour Party from the Labour Party.)	▲13	28.2	863,789	36.8	▲4.2
Liberal	3	0	4	▼4	4.2	174,235	6.7	▼1.9
Ind. Labour Party	4	Newly independent		▲4	5.4	111,256	5.0	—N/a
SNP	0	0	0	Steady	—	25,652	1.1	▲0.1 (Note: Compared with its predecessor party, the National Party of Scotland.)
Communist	1	1 (Note: Willie Gallacher in West Fife.)	0	▲1	1.4	13,462	0.6	▼1.0
Total	71			0	100.0	2,323,797	100.0	0.0
Registered voters, and turnout						3,073,838 (Note: Electorate in contested constituencies. The total electorate was 3,115,917.)	72.6	▼4.8

=== Votes summary ===
Popular vote
Unionist	42.0%
Labour	36.8%
Liberal	6.7%
National Liberal	6.7%
Ind. Labour Party	5.0%
SNP	1.1%
National Labour	0.9%
Communist	0.6%
National	0.2%

Popular vote (coalitions)
National Gov.	49.8%
Labour	36.8%
Liberal	6.7%
Ind. Labour Party	5.0%
SNP	1.1%
Communist	0.6%

=== Parliament seats ===
Parliament seats
Unionist	50.0%
Labour	27.0%
National Liberal	10.8%
Ind. Labour Party	5.4%
Liberal	4.1%
National Labour	1.4%
Communist	1.4%

Parliament seats (coalitions)
National Gov.	62.2%
Labour	27.0%
Ind. Labour Party	5.4%
Liberal	4.1%
Communist	1.4%

== Combined Scottish Universities result ==
The Combined Scottish Universities elected an additional 3 members to the house using the STV voting method. Note that there was no election in 1931 as only three candidates stood for election.

Party	Seats				First Preference Votes		
Party	Total	Gains	Losses	Net	Total	Of all (%)	Difference
National Government (Total)	3	1	0	▲1	23,260	85.8	—N/a
Unionist	2	0	0	Steady	15,731	58.0	—N/a
Liberal National	1	1	0	▲1	7,529	27.8	—N/a
SNP	0	New			3,865	14.3	New
Liberal	0	0	1	▼1	0	0.0	—N/a
Total	3				27,125		

== See also ==
- 1935 United Kingdom general election in England
- 1935 United Kingdom general election in Wales
- 1935 United Kingdom general election in Northern Ireland
