= William Whitla =

Irish physician and politician

Sir William Whitla
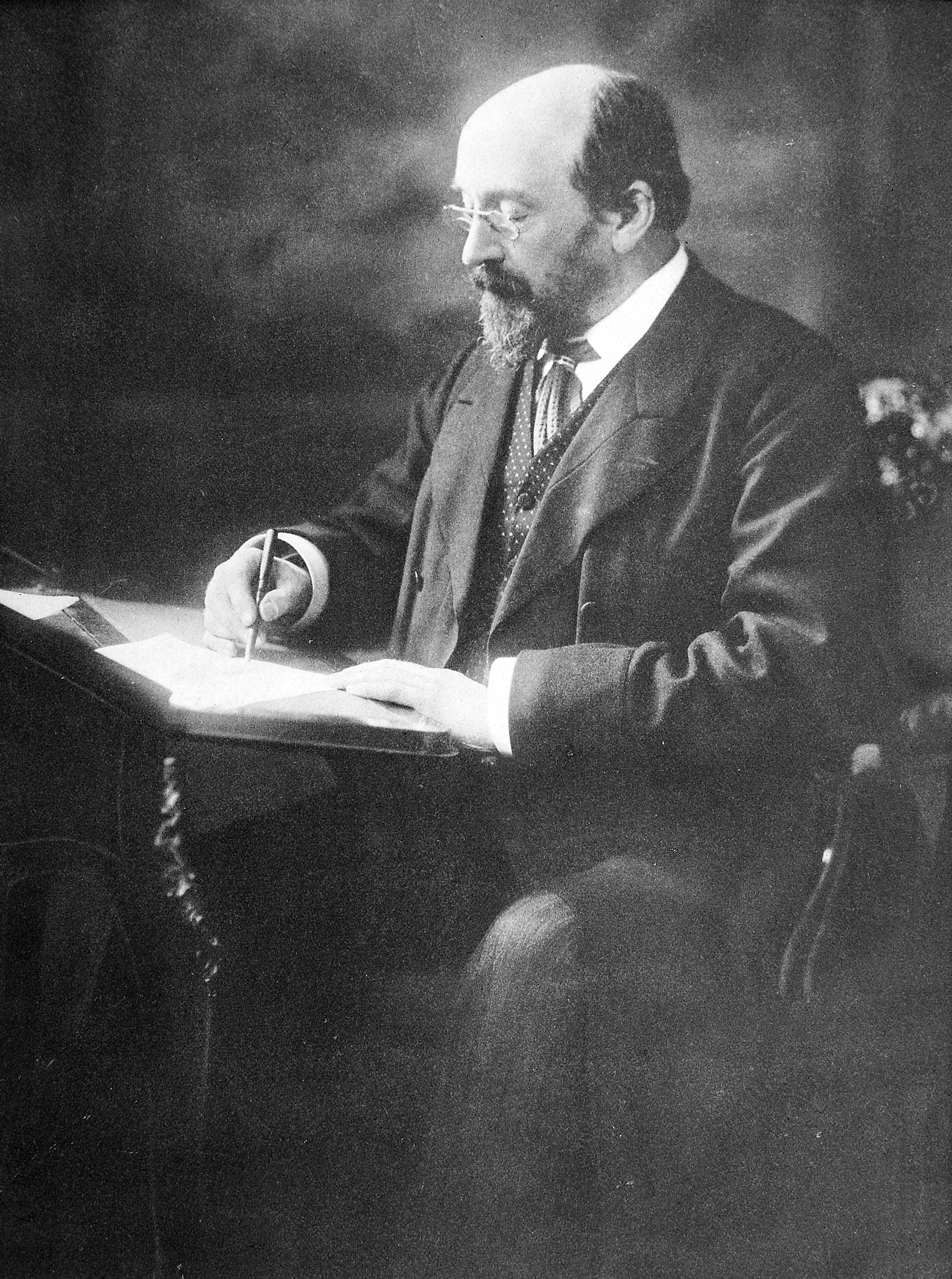

Member of Parliament for Queen's University of Belfast
- In office 14 December 1918 – 16 November 1923
- Preceded by: Constituency created
- Succeeded by: Thomas Sinclair

Personal details
- Born: 15 September 1851 Monaghan, Ireland
- Died: 11 December 1933 Belfast, Northern Ireland
- Party: Ulster Unionist Party
- Spouse: Ada Bourne
- Education: Queen's College Belfast
- Profession: Physician

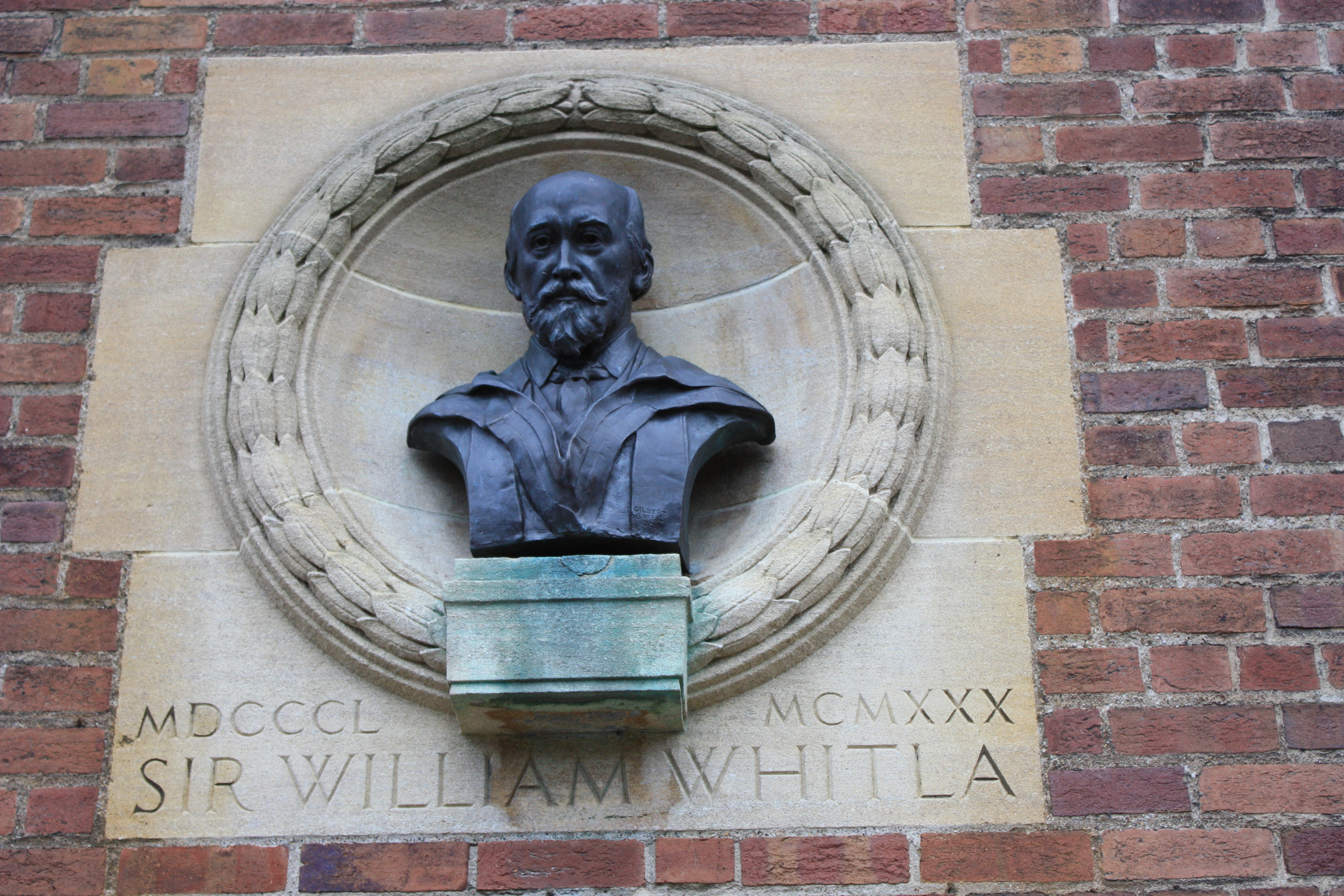
Bust of Sir William Whitla on the Whitla Hall, Queen's University, Belfast

Sir William Whitla (15 September 1851 – 11 December 1933) was an Irish physician and politician.

== Early life ==
Born and raised at The Diamond in Monaghan Town, William was the fourth son of Robert Whitla (originally Whitlaw), a woollen draper and pawnbroker who may have been from County Armagh, and his wife Anne, daughter of Alexander Williams of Dublin. His parents eventually had five sons and seven daughters. William's first cousin was the painter Alexander Williams, RHA.

Educated at the town's Model School, he was articled at fifteen to his brother James, a local pharmacist who had a chemist shop on Dublin Street in Monaghan Town, William completing his apprenticeship with Wheeler and Whitaker, Belfast's leading pharmaceutical firm.

Proceeding to study medicine at Queen's College, Belfast, Whitla took the LAH, Dublin, and the LRCP and LRCS of Edinburgh in 1873.

Although born and raised as a Presbyterian, William and his wife converted to Methodism shortly after their marriage.

== Career ==
With his qualifications he obtained a post as resident medical officer at the Belfast General Hospital. He next spent some time in London, at St Thomas's Hospital, where he met his future wife, Ada Bourne (1846–1932), daughter of George Bourne, a prominent Staffordshire farmer. She was a ward sister and friend of Florence Nightingale, and a member of the Salvation Army.

The pair were married in 1876, setting up house at 41 Great Victoria Street, Belfast, where Whitla established a general medical practice. He was awarded the MD of the Queen's University of Ireland in 1877, with first class honours, gold medal, and commendation.

Whitla was appointed physician to the Belfast Royal Hospital and the Ulster Hospital for Children and Women in 1882. He held that post at the Belfast Royal Hospital and in the Royal Victoria Hospital, of which it was the forerunner, until his retirement in 1918. In 1884, the couple moved to 8 College Square North.

Whitla was twice president of the Ulster Medical Society (1886–87, 1901–02).

In 1890, Whitla succeeded Seaton Reid as professor of materia medica at the Queen's College in 1890.

Appointed a Knight Bachelor in the 1902 Coronation Honours list published on 26 June 1902, he was knighted by the Lord Lieutenant of Ireland, Earl Cadogan, at Dublin Castle on 11 August 1902.

In 1906, Whitla was appointed a governor of Methodist College Belfast and he took a keen interest in the school's affairs. That year the Whitlas moved to Lennoxvale, a suburban mansion, they also retained the professional house in College Square. In 1919, he retired as professor of Materia Medica in the university.

He served the British Medical Association as president in 1909.

=== Political career ===
A strong unionist, he was elected to Parliament in 1918, serving until 1923 as representative of the Queen's University at Westminster. He was appointed Honorary Physician to the King in Ireland in 1919, and was subsequently university pro-chancellor.

== Later life ==
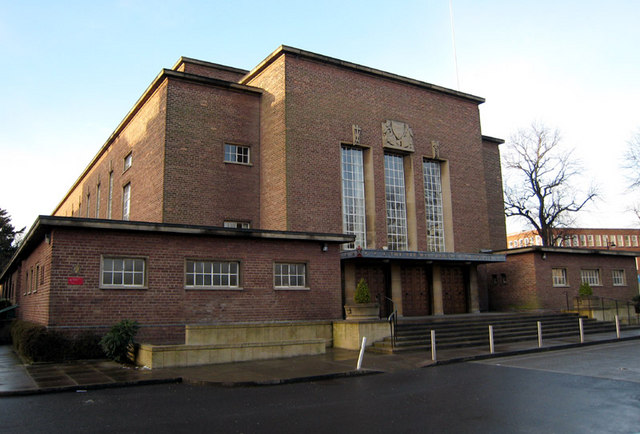
The Whitla Hall, Queen's University, Belfast

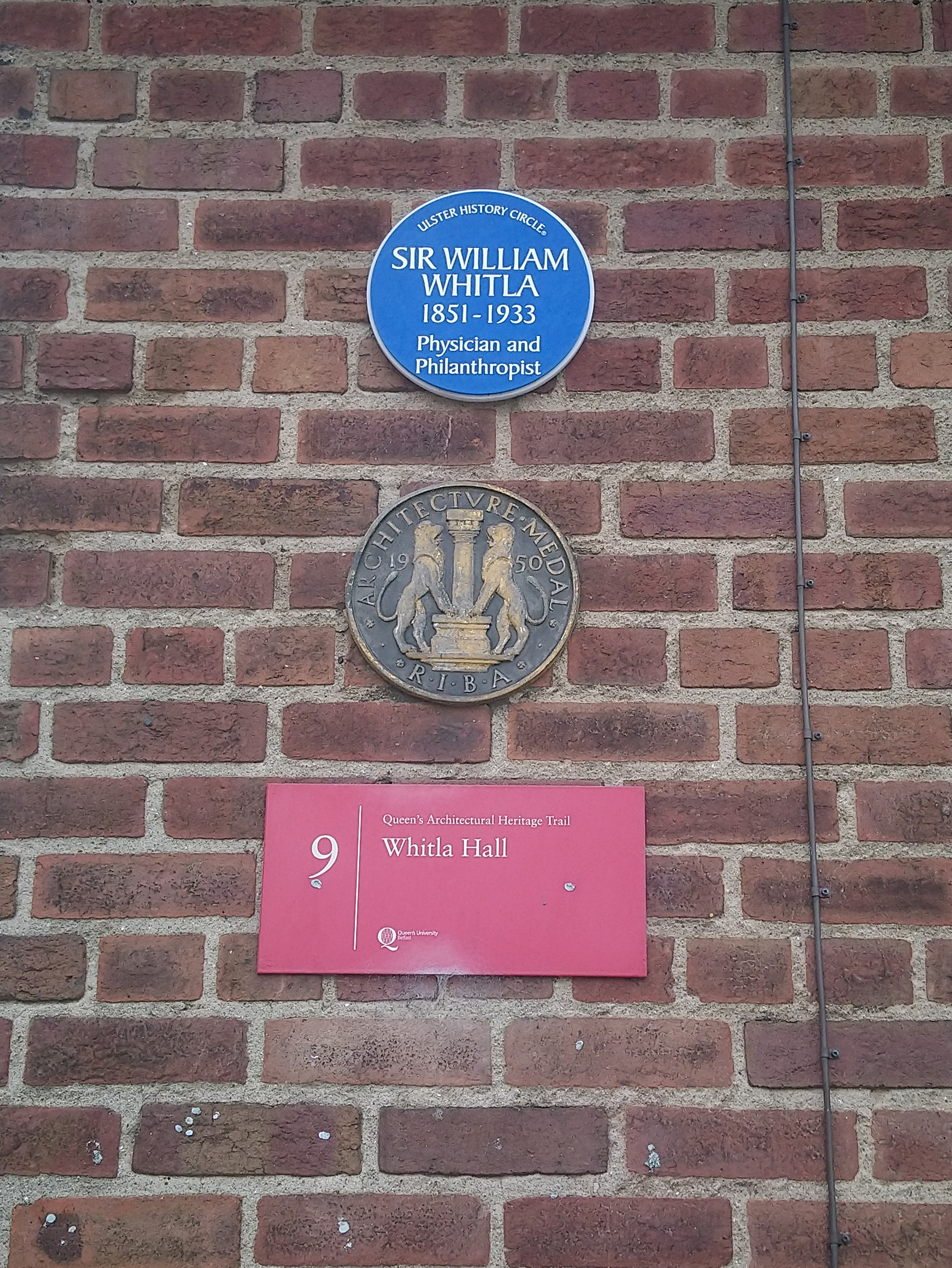
Plaque commemorating Sir William Whitla, located on the north-east corner of Whitla Hall

Professor Sir William and Lady Whitla were childless, and they were wealthy. Together with his practice and books he had a flair for making wise investments, buying oil shares to his great financial advantage. The Whitlas travelled widely, visiting Russia, Canada, and many Mediterranean cities.

As a biblical scholar he contributed an introductory study of the nature and the cause of unbelief, of miracles, and prophecy to an edition of Sir Isaac Newton's Daniel and the Apocalypse published by John Murray in 1922. As the decade progressed his public appearances were fewer, and after a stroke in 1929 he was confined to his room. Lady Whitla died in 1932; he died at Lennoxvale on 11 December 1933, and was given a civic funeral two days later; he was buried at Belfast City Cemetery.

== Legacy ==
During Whitla's lifetime his gifts to his profession included the Good Samaritan stained glass window (commemorating the heroic behaviour of two Ulster doctors) erected in the Royal Hospital, and a building to house the Ulster Medical Society. At his death Lennoxvale was bequeathed to Queen's University as a residence for the Vice-Chancellor. The university also was his residuary legatee, and acted on his suggestion that the available funds should provide an assembly hall. The Sir William Whitla Hall was opened in 1949, and now bears a plaque commemorating him.

He also left £10,000 to Methodist College Belfast to build a chapel, library or hall. The Whitla Hall at the Methodist College was opened in 1935.

== Selected publications ==
- Sir Isaac Newton's Daniel and the Apocalypse; with an introductory study of the nature and the cause of unbelief, of miracles and prophecy (John Murray, 1922)
- A dictionary of treatment: including medical and surgical therapeutics (J.F. Hartz Co., Ltd., 1920)
- Elements of pharmacy, materia medica, and therapeutics (H. Renshaw, 1884)

== Notes ==
Parliament of the United Kingdom
Preceded by New Constituency	Member of Parliament for Queen's University of Belfast; 1918–1923	Succeeded by Thomas Sinclair
