= Gerald Bailey =

British politician

Vernon Gerald Bailey (1903 – 12 May 1975), was a prominent British peace campaigner and Liberal Party politician who was an early pioneer of a Popular Front later advocated by Sir Stafford Cripps.

He was the son of Vernon Bailey of Clitheroe, Lancashire. He was educated at Bootham School, York and Clare College, Cambridge.

He was the Liberal candidate for the Petersfield Division of Hampshire at the 1929 General Election.

General Election 1929: Petersfield Electorate 41,587
Party	Candidate	Votes	%	±%
Conservative	Rt Hon. William Graham Nicholson	15,605	55.0	
Liberal	Vernon Gerald Bailey	9,334	32.9	
Labour	Getrude Speedwell Massingham	3,418	12.1	
Majority		6,271	22.1	
Turnout			68.2	

He was a Quaker and a committed pacifist. In 1930 he was appointed the Directing Secretary of the National Peace Council. Bailey was re-selected by Petersfield Liberals to contest the next General Election. Following the formation of the National Government in September 1931 a general election was called. Bailey started his campaign, but when it became clear that his Conservative opponent was being endorsed by not only the Conservative leader Stanley Baldwin but also the Prime Minister Ramsay MacDonald, Bailey withdrew on 14 October. Bailey believed that the Conservative dominated National Government could only be defeated if supporters of the Liberal and Labour parties came together locally to support a single candidate. To this end he stood as an Independent Progressive candidate for the Aldershot Division of Hampshire at the 1935 General Election. His candidature had the support of both local Liberal and Labour parties.

General Election 1935: Aldershot Electorate 41,376
Party	Candidate	Votes	%	±%
Conservative	Rt Hon. Viscount Wolmer	17,730	73.4	
Independent Progressive	Vernon Gerald Bailey	6,421	26.6	
Majority		11,309	46.8	
Turnout			58.4	

In 1948 he played a leading role at Geneva in the formation of the World Union of Peace Organisations. In 1949 he resigned from his position at the National Peace Council. Bailey was the author of a number of books on Peace, including Peace with Russia? (1950), The Politics of Peace (1963) and Problems of peace (1970).
