= 1935 Guatemalan presidential term referendum =

- 25 May 1935
- Do you want to extend the presidential term of President Jorge Ubico Castañeda?

Results
Choice	Votes	%
Yes	884,703	99.86%
No	1,227	0.14%
Valid votes	885,930	100.00%
Invalid or blank votes	0	0.00%
Total votes	885,930	100.00%
Registered voters/turnout		70.00%

A referendum on the presidential term of Jorge Ubico was held in Guatemala on 25 May 1935. If approved, it would have allowed Ubico to override the constitutional limitation on serving two consecutive terms in office. It was reportedly approved by 99.85% of voters.

== Background ==
In 1934, a group of civilians feared that Ubico intended to establish a dictatorship. They planned to assassinate him, and drew in military allies who had lost administrative posts or commands under his rule. However, they were betrayed from within, and many were executed as a result. Six months later, Ubico convened a Constitutional Assembly with the aim of changing the constitution to allow him to remain in office until 1943.

Congress received thousands of (allegedly) spontaneous and identical petitions from 246 municipalities, which all called for the constitution to be amended to extend his term in office. Ubico then called a referendum on the issue.

== Results ==
Choice	Votes	%
For	834,168	99.85
Against	1,227	0.15
Invalid/blank votes		-
Total	835,395	100
Source: Grieb

== Bibliography ==
- Campang Chang, José. El estado y los partidos políticos en Guatemala. 1944-1951. Guatemala: Universidad de San Carlos. 1992.
- Dosal, Paul J. Doing business with the dictators: a political history of United Fruit in Guatemala, 1899-1944. Wilmington: Scholarly Resources. 1993.
- Political handbook of the world 1935. New York, 1936.
- Rodríguez de Ita, Guadalupe. La participación política en la primavera guatemalteca: una aproximación a la historia de los partidos durante el periodo 1944-1954. México: Universidad Autónoma del Estado de México, Universidad Nacional Autónoma de México. 2003.
