= 1935 Hong Kong sanitary board election =

1935 uncontested Hong Kong election

- 22 May 1935
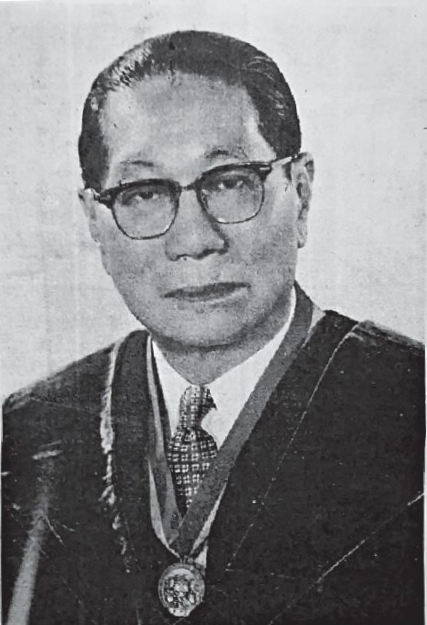
Nominee	Li Shu-fan
Party	Nonpartisan
Popular vote	Uncontested
Member before election
Li Shu-fan
Elected Member
Li Shu-fan

The 1935 Hong Kong Sanitary Board election was supposed to be held on 22 May 1935 for one of the two unofficial seats in the Sanitary Board of Hong Kong. It was the last election for the Sanitary Board before it was renamed to Urban Council in 1936.

Only ratepayers who were included in the Special and Common Jury Lists of the years or ratepayers who are exempted from serving on Juries on account of their professional avocations, unofficial members of the Executive or Legislative Council, or categories of profession were entitled to vote at the election.

Dr. Li Shu-fan held his seat without being contested.
