= 1935 Guatemalan Constituent Assembly election =

Constituent Assembly elections were held in Guatemala in June 1935. Following the election, Jorge Ubico’s presidential term was extended to 15 March 1943 by the Assembly on 10 July 1935.
