= 1935 Baltimore mayoral election =

Baltimore mayoral election, 1935
- May 7, 1935
Candidate	Howard W. Jackson	Blanchard Russell, Jr.
Party	Democratic	Republican
Popular vote	114,321	75,368
Percentage	60.27%	39.73%
Mayor before election
Howard W. Jackson
Democratic
Elected mayor
Howard W. Jackson
Democratic

The 1935 Baltimore mayoral election saw the reelection of Howard W. Jackson for a second consecutive and third overall term.

== General election ==
The general election was held May 7.

Baltimore mayoral general election, 1935
Party	Candidate	Votes	%
Democratic	Howard W. Jackson (incumbent)	114,321	60.27%
Republican	Blanchard Russell, Jr.	75,368	39.73%
Total votes		189,689	
