= Douglas Savory =

Sir Douglas Savory

Member of Parliament for South Antrim
- In office 23 February 1950 – 6 May 1955
- Preceded by: Constituency recreated Charles Craig (1921)
- Succeeded by: Knox Cunningham

Member of Parliament for Queen's University of Belfast
- In office 2 November 1940 – 3 February 1950
- Preceded by: Thomas Sinclair
- Succeeded by: Constituency abolished

Personal details
- Born: 17 August 1878 Palgrave, England
- Died: 5 October 1969 (aged 91) Belfast, Northern Ireland
- Party: Ulster Unionist Party
- Education: St John's College, Oxford
- Profession: Academic

Sir Douglas Lloyd Savory (17 August 1878 – 5 October 1969) was a professor of French and a member of the Parliament of the United Kingdom.

The second son of the Rev. E. L. Savory, Rector of Palgrave in Suffolk, he was born there and educated at Marlborough College and St John's College, Oxford. He taught French and English at the University of Marburg before becoming Professor of French Language and Romance Philology at Queen's University, Belfast in 1909. In the First World War, he was attached to the Intelligence Division of the Admiralty.

Following the resignation of Thomas Sinclair, Savory was elected unopposed as Ulster Unionist Member of Parliament (MP) for the seat of Queen's University of Belfast, retiring from his university chair. He held the seat until its abolition in 1950, at which point he was elected for South Antrim, which he represented until 1955. He was knighted in 1952.

He became special investigator into the Katyn massacre of Polish officers in 1940. He was president of the Huguenot Society of London.

Parliament of the United Kingdom
Preceded by Thomas Sinclair	Member of Parliament for Queen's University of Belfast; 1940–1950	Constituency abolished
New constituency	MP for South Antrim; 1950–1955	Succeeded by Knox Cunningham
