= 1935 Soviet Union legislative election =

- January 1935

All 2,022 seats in the All-Union Congress of Soviets
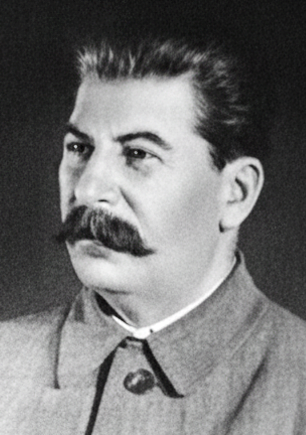

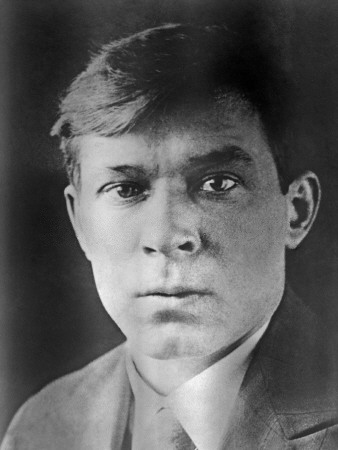
	First party	Second party	Third party
Leader	Joseph Stalin		Aleksandr Kosarev
Party	VKP(b)	Independents	Komsomol
Seats won	1,498	425	99
Seat change	▲347	▲35	▲64
Chairman of the Council of People's Commissars before election
Vyacheslav Molotov
VKP(b)
Elected Chairman of the Council of People's Commissars
Vyacheslav Molotov
VKP(b)

Elections to the seventh All-Union Congress of Soviets were held in January 1935, with 2,022 deputies elected or delegated.

== Results ==
Party	Seats	+/–
All-Union Communist Party (Bolsheviks)	1,498	+347
Komsomol	99	+64
Independents	425	+35
Total	2,022	+446
