= 1935 United Kingdom general election =

- 14 November 1935

All 615 seats in the House of Commons 308 seats needed for a majority
- Registered: 31,374,449
- Turnout: 21,997,054; 71.1% (▼5.3 pp)
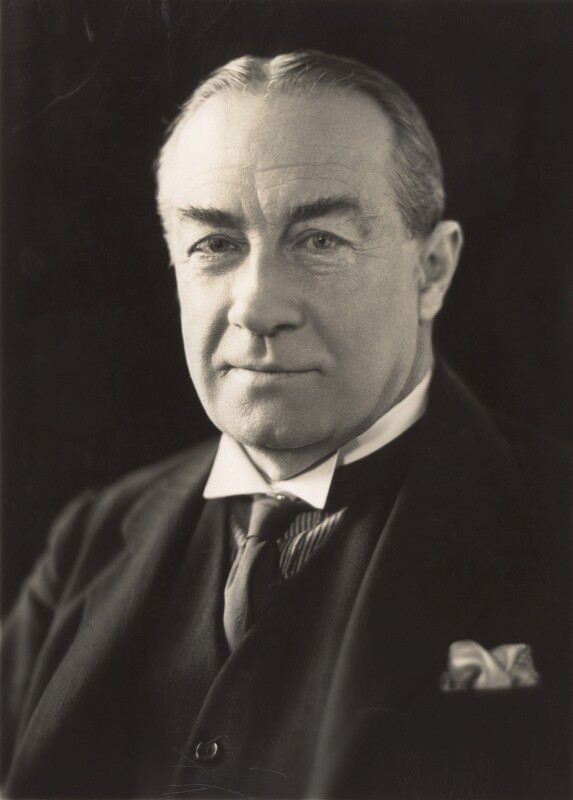

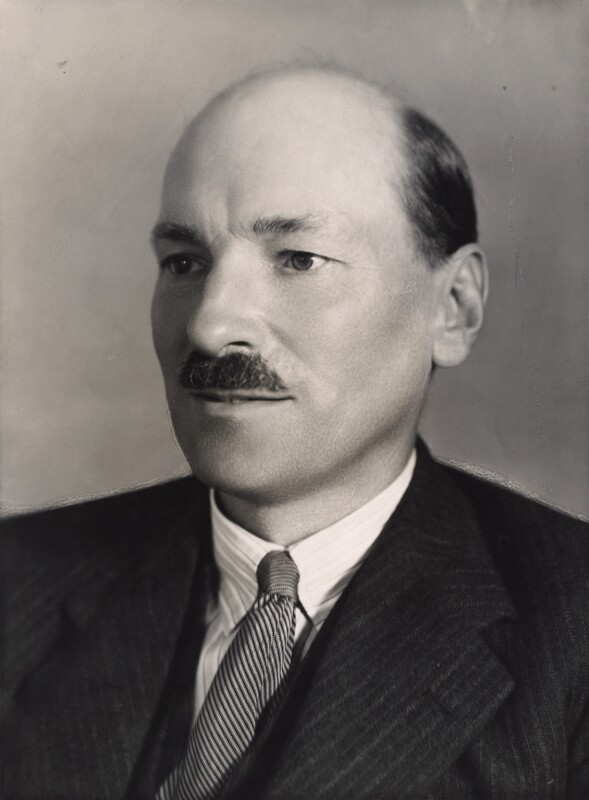

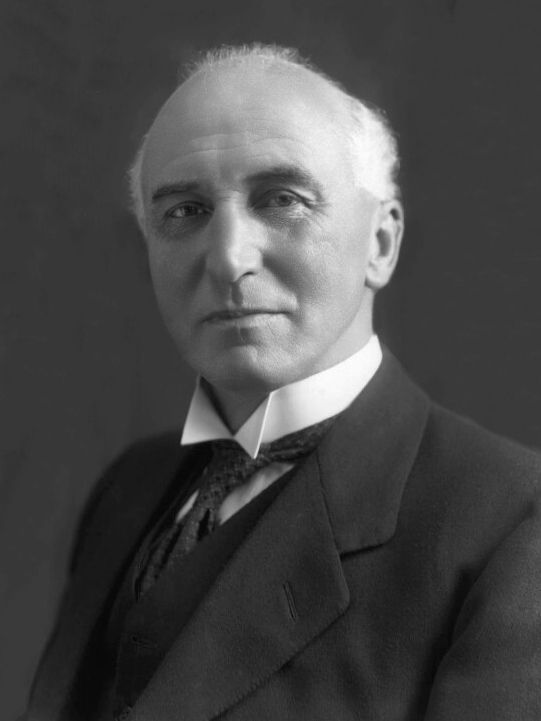

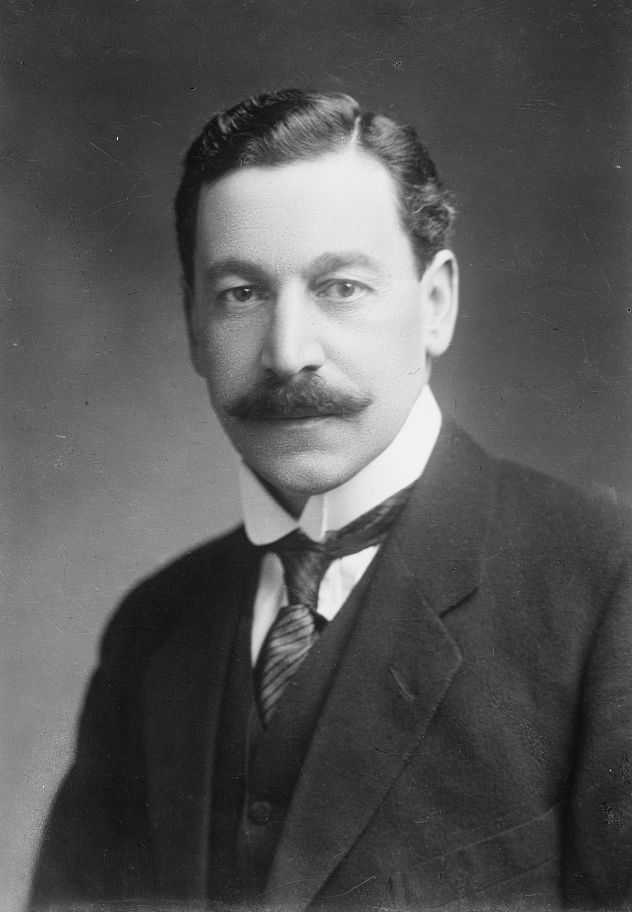

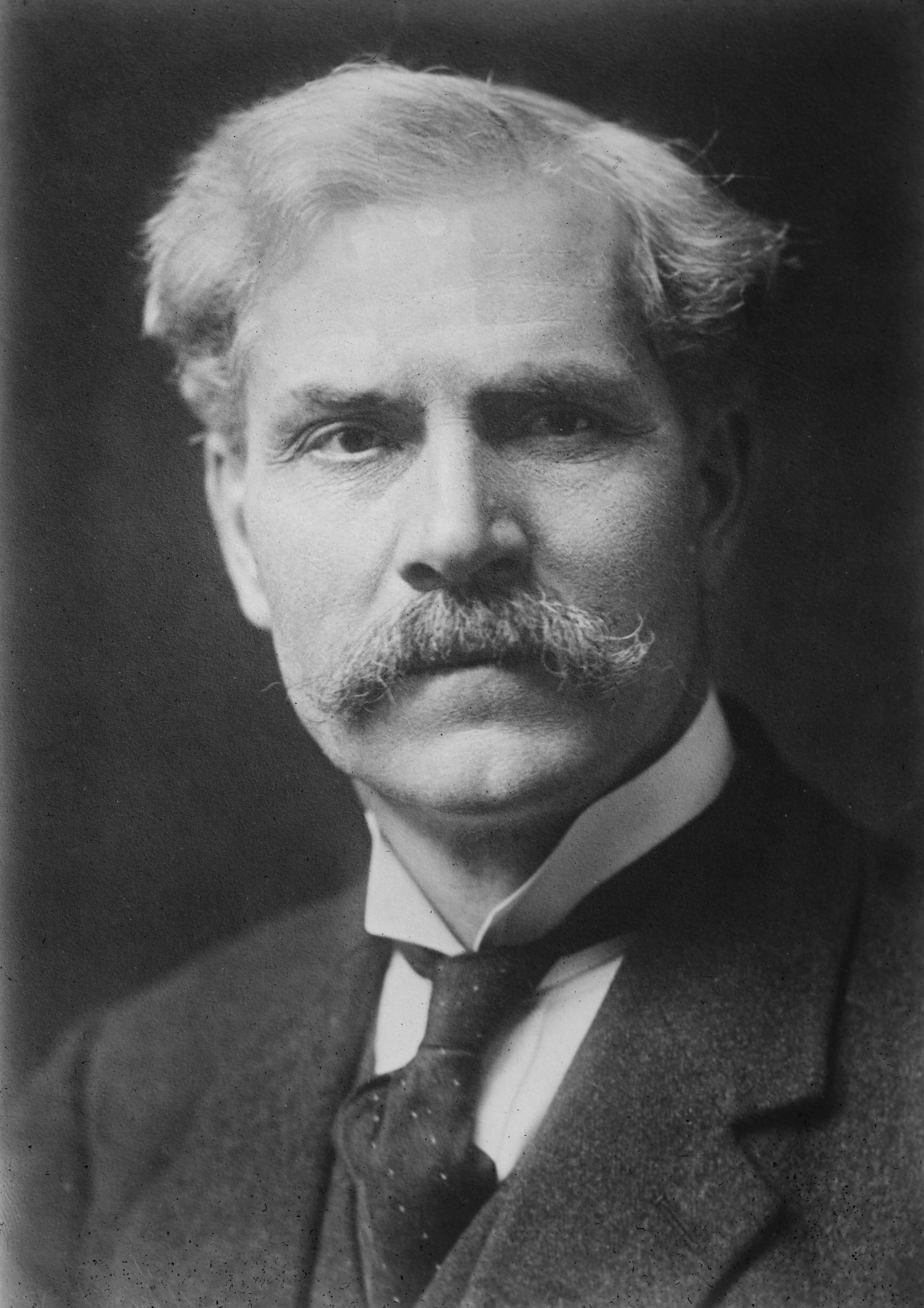
	First party	Second party	Third party
Leader	Stanley Baldwin	Clement Attlee	John Simon
Party	Conservative	Labour	Liberal National
Alliance	National Government		National Government
Leader since	23 May 1923	25 October 1935	5 October 1931
Leader's seat	Bewdley	Limehouse	Spen Valley
Last election	470 seats, 55.0%	52 seats, 30.9%	35 seats, 3.7%
Seats won	387 (Note: Figure includes Speaker of the House of Commons Edward FitzRoy in Daventry.)	154	33
Seat change	▼83	▲102	▼2
Popular vote	10,496,300	8,325,491	866,354
Percentage	47.8%	38.0%	3.7%
Swing	▼7.2 pp	▲7.1 pp	Steady
	Fourth party	Fifth party
Leader	Herbert Samuel	Ramsay MacDonald
Party	Liberal	National Labour
Alliance		National Government
Leader since	October 1931	24 August 1931
Leader's seat	Darwen (lost seat)	Seaham (lost seat)
Last election	36 seats, 7.0% (Note: Figure is the combined seats and vote share of the Liberal Party and Independent Liberals in 1931. The Independent Liberals group would rejoin the Liberal Party within a month after the election.)	13 seats, 1.5%
Seats won	21	8
Seat change	▼15	▼5
Popular vote	1,443,093	339,811
Percentage	6.7%	1.5%
Swing	▼0.3 pp	Steady
- Colours denote the winning party—as shown in § Results

- Composition of the House of Commons after the election
Prime Minister before election
Stanley Baldwin
National
Prime Minister after election
Stanley Baldwin
National

A general election was held in the United Kingdom on Thursday 14 November 1935. It resulted in a second (though reduced) landslide victory for the three-party National Government, which was led by Stanley Baldwin of the Conservative Party after the resignation – due to ill health – of Ramsay MacDonald earlier in the year. It is the most recent British general election to have seen any party or alliance of parties win a majority of the popular vote.

As in 1931, the National Government was a coalition of the Conservatives with small breakaway factions of the Labour and Liberal parties, and the group campaigned together under a shared manifesto on a platform of continuing its work addressing the economic crises caused by the Great Depression. The re-elected government was again dominated by the Conservatives, but, while the National Liberals remained relatively stable in terms of vote share and seats, National Labour lost many of its seats – including that of leader Ramsay MacDonald.

The Labour Party, under what was at the time of the election regarded internally as the caretaker leadership of Clement Attlee, was the main beneficiary of the swing away from the Conservatives and National Labour. The party achieved its then–best ever result in terms of share of the popular vote, and won back around half of the seats it had lost in the previous election. The Liberal Party, which had split from the National Government in 1932 over the issue of free trade, continued its decline, losing many of its seats (including that of leader Herbert Samuel).

The election ushered in an era of two-party politics dominated by the Conservatives and Labour, which would last until the revival of the Liberals in the 1970s under Jeremy Thorpe. It was also the first election since 1895 in which the Independent Labour Party stood separately from the Labour Party, having disaffiliated in 1932. In Scotland, it was the first general election contested by the Scottish National Party, and the Communist Party gained its first seat in ten years (West Fife).

This was the last election to be held during the reign of King George V, who died in January 1936. Due to the outbreak of the Second World War in 1939, the next general election was not held until 1945.

== Background ==
National Labour leader Ramsay MacDonald had led the National Government since its establishment in August 1931, but the Conservative Party was by far the largest within the coalition, with 470 of its 554 seats. MacDonald's health was increasingly poor throughout his time as prime minister, and in June 1935 he handed his office to Conservative leader Stanley Baldwin.

The near-wipeout of October 1931 had seen the new Labour Party leader Arthur Henderson lose his seat; and a year later, George Lansbury became the party's leader. However, as a radical Christian pacifist, Lansbury strongly opposed rearmament; this put him at odds with his party's membership, his own MPs, and many of the party's affiliated trade unions, all of whom had begun to view investing in the UK's military capabilities as a necessary response to the rising threat of European fascism.

This disagreement came to a head at Labour's annual conference in October 1935, where a motion was tabled for the party to endorse sanctions against Italy for its invasion of Abyssinia. Lansbury opposed the motion, but when it passed he decided that his position was untenable, and he resigned on 8 October. Baldwin, recognising that the government's main opposition was in disarray and seeking a mandate for his new administration, called an election on 19 October, and Parliament was subsequently dissolved on 25 October. Without time to choose a new leader before the general election, Lansbury's deputy, Clement Attlee, was appointed interim leader.

As in 1931, the election was dominated by the impact of the Great Depression – in particular, persistently high unemployment – and the National Government sought to continue its program of reforms designed to repair the economy. However, foreign policy and defence were significantly more important than in the previous election, with the role of the League of Nations, the increasing belligerence of the Empire of Japan, the remilitarisation of Germany under Adolf Hitler, and the Italian invasion of Abyssinia all key issues. There was a heated internal debate within the National Government over the extent to which it ought to pursue rearmament in response to the rising threat of another war in Europe. Baldwin was generally opposed to rearmament, and the coalition's manifesto reflected his position, promising that rearmament would be "strictly confined to what is required to make the country and the Empire safe."

The Liberal Party had fractured into three separate factions in 1931 over the question of whether to support the National Government's policy of trade protectionism, and it remained just as divided over economic policy in 1935. The party and the Independent Liberal group set up by former leader David Lloyd George had gradually been re-aligning during the previous years, but a full reunification did not occur in time for the election, causing Lloyd George to restrict his personal fortune (on which the Liberals had relied greatly during his time as leader) to funding the campaigns of his allies. Lacking financial resources, the main Liberal Party was only able to put up candidates in 159 constituencies.

== Candidates ==
Below is a table summarising the candidates of the 1935 general election in the United Kingdom, including those in the university constituencies.

Affiliation	Candidates
Labour Party	552 (Note: Includes 21 Co-operative Party candidates, as part of the Labour-Co-op alliance.)
Conservative Party	515 (Note: Includes 60 Unionist candidates in Scotland, and 13 Ulster Unionist Party candidates in Northern Ireland.)
Liberal Party	161 (Note: Includes the Independent Liberal group, which would rejoin the party within a month following the election. Those candidates that stood were Megan Lloyd George in Anglesey, Goronwy Owen in Caernarvonshire, Leader of the Independent Liberals David Lloyd George in Caernarvon Boroughs and Gwilym Lloyd George in Pembrokeshire.)
Liberal National Party	44
National Labour Organisation	20
Independent Labour Party	17
Scottish National Party	8
National	4 (Note: The candidates that stood were Charles Markham in Ilkeston, William Bruce stood in Caithness and Sutherland, Ivor Guest in Brecon and Radnorshire and G C Hutchinson in Gower.)
Independent	4 (Note: The candidates that stood were Walter George Bagnall in Colne Valley, Violet Van der Elst in Putney, A. P. Herbert in Oxford University and Eleanor Rathbone in Oxford University.)
Independent Nationalist	3
Nationalist Party	2
National Independent	2 (Note: The candidates that stood were Austin Hopkinson stood in Mossley and Ernest Graham-Little in London University.)
Independent Conservative	2 (Note: The candidates that stood were Linton Thorp in Nelson and Colne and James Lockwood in Shipley.)
Communist Party of Great Britain	2 (Note: The candidates that stood were Willie Gallacher stood in West Fife and General Secretary of the Communist Party of Great Britain Harry Pollitt in Rhondda East.)
National Dividend	2 (Note: The candidates that stood were HC Bell in Birmingham Erdington and Reginald Kenney in Bradford North.)
Independent Labour	1 (Note: Candidate William Brown stood in Wolverhampton West.)
Liverpool Protestant Party	1 (Note: Candidate Harry Dixon Longbottom stood in Liverpool Kirkdale.)
Independent Progressive	1 (Note: Candidate Gerald Bailey stood in Aldershot.)
People's Peace	1 (Note: Candidate James Monteith Erskine stood in Farnworth.)
Social Credit Party	1 (Note: Candidate stood Wilfred Townend in Leeds South.)
Plaid Cymru	1 (Note: Canidate John Edward Daniel stood in Caernarvonshire.)
Independent Liberal	1 (Note: Candidate Percy McDougall stood in Manchester Rusholme.)
Agricultural Defence League	1 (Note: Candidate George Pitt-Rivers stood in North Dorset.)
Christian Socialist	1 (Note: Candidate J. A. Harper stood in Walsall.)
Radical Reform	1 (Note: Candidate Thomas Disher stood in Camberwell North.)
Total	1,348

== Outcome ==
The election resulted in another landslide for the National Government, with two-thirds of the seats in the House of Commons and a narrow majority of the overall popular vote. This was a less dominating performance than in 1931 – when the coalition had won two-thirds of the vote and 90.1% of seats – but it was still a clear mandate for the National Government to continue its programme of economic reforms.

It remains the most recent election in which any party or alliance of parties secured a majority of the popular vote. (The coalition between the Conservatives and Liberal Democrats that formed after the 2010 general election represented 59.1% of votes cast, but the two parties had campaigned against each other.) It was also the last election until 1997 in which any party or alliance of parties won more than 400 seats.

Despite Labour's success in terms of vote share – higher than Ramsay MacDonald's result in 1929, Harold Wilson's in February 1974, Tony Blair's in 2005, and Keir Starmer's in 2024, all of which put the party into government – the 1935 general election remains the most recent at which the party has won fewer than 200 seats. Attlee won Labour's subsequent leadership election on 26 November 1935, and he went on to become the first Labour leader to both win a plurality of votes in a general election and a majority of seats in the House of Commons (in 1945).

Labour's revival came partly at the expense of National Labour, which lost five of its 13 seats, including Ramsay MacDonald's own seat of Seaham. MacDonald was able to rejoin the Commons thanks to a by-election victory only two months later, in January 1936; however, after his death in November 1937 the party struggled under the new leadership of his son, Malcolm MacDonald, and it eventually disbanded ahead of the 1945 election.

The election also marked the continued decline of the Liberals from a natural party of government into a fringe third party within a two-party system dominated by the Conservatives and Labour. The 21 seats secured in 1935 and the 12 seats secured in 1945 proved to be the last occasions until 1966 that the Liberal Party won more than ten seats at an election, and the 1935 election was the last time (before its alliance and merger with the Social Democratic Party in the 1980s) that the party won more than 20 seats. The National Liberals within the government, meanwhile, struggled in the following years to differentiate themselves from their coalition partners, and the party's small rump of MPs were absorbed into the Conservatives in 1968.

The resulting parliamentary term would see two changes of Prime Minister: Neville Chamberlain took over from Baldwin in 1937, and then Chamberlain himself resigned in 1940 and was replaced by Winston Churchill, who formed a new cross-party wartime coalition which included the Labour and Liberal parties. Due to the war, another general election was not held until Allied victory was confirmed in 1945.

== Results ==
=== Summary of seats returned ===
Party	Leader	MPs		Aggregate votes	
Party	Leader		Of total		Of total (Note: Adjusted for multi-member constituencies.)
Conservative and Unionist Party	Stanley Baldwin	387	62.9%	10,496,300	47.8%
Conservative Party (Note: Results for England and Wales.)	Stanley Baldwin	339	55.1%	9,225,134	42.1%
Unionist Party	John Craik-Henderson	37	6.0%	978,326	4.4%
Ulster Unionist Party	James Craig	11	1.8%	292,840	1.3%
Labour Party	Clement Attlee	154 (Note: Includes 9 Co-operative Party MPs, as part of the Labour-Co-op alliance.)	25.0%	8,325,491	38.0%
Liberal National Party	John Simon	33	5.4%	866,354	3.7%
Liberal Party	Herbert Samuel	21	3.4%	1,443,093	6.7%
National Labour Organisation	Ramsay MacDonald	8	1.3%	339,811	1.5%
Independent Labour Party	James Maxton	4	0.7%	139,577	0.7%
Nationalist Party	Thomas Joseph Campbell	2	0.3%	101,494	0.3%
National Independent	—N/a	2	0.3%	33,527	0.2%
Independent	—N/a	2	0.3%	6,165	0.0%
National	—N/a	1	0.2%	53,189	0.3%
Communist Party of Great Britain	Harry Pollitt	1	0.2%	27,117	0.1%

=== Full results ===
Below is a table summarising the full results of the 1935 general election in the United Kingdom.

Note: The seat and vote share change for the National Government coalition reflects on the parties that remained part of it in the election, and does not include the Liberal Party's change in seats and vote share or the outcome of the party leaving the National Government in 1932 and going into complete opposition in 1933.

Results of the November 1935 general election to the House of Commons of the United Kingdom
Party	Leader	Candidates	MPs					Aggregate votes		
Party	Leader	Candidates	Total	Gains	Losses	Net	Of total (%)	Total	Of total (%) (Note: Adjusted for multi-member constituencies.)	Change (%)
National Government (Total)	Stanley; Baldwin	583	429	13	106	▼93	69.8	11,755,654	53.3	▼7.4
Conservative (Note: Figure includes the Unionist Party and the Ulster Unionist Party under their nation affiliations with the Conservative Party.)	Stanley; Baldwin	515	387	6	89	▼83	62.9	10,496,300	47.8	▼7.2
Liberal National	John; Simon	44	33	5	7	▼2	5.4	866,354	3.7	Steady
National Labour	Ramsay; MacDonald	20	8	1	6	▼5	1.3	339,811	1.5	Steady
National	—N/a	4	1	1 (Note: Ivor Guest in Brecon and Radnorshire.)	4 (Note: Gordon Campbell in Burnley, William Allen in Burslem and Ian Horobin in Southwark Central. William Craven-Ellis in Southampton was re-elected, but as an official Conservative Party candidate.)	▼3	0.2	53,189	0.3	▼0.2
Labour Party	Clement; Attlee	552 (Note: Includes 20 Co-operative Party candidates, as part of the Labour-Co-op alliance.)	154 (Note: Includes 9 Co-operative Party MPs, as part of the Labour-Co-op alliance.)	105 (Note: Includes 8 Co-operative Party MPs, as part of the Labour-Co-op alliance.)	3	▲102	25.0 (Note: Includes 1.5% for the Co-operative Party, as part of the Labour-Co-op alliance.)	8,325,491 (Note: Includes 347,728 for the Co-operative Party, as part of the Labour-Co-op alliance.)	38.0 (Note: Includes 1.7% for the Co-operative Party, as part of the Labour-Co-op alliance.)	▲7.1 (Note: Includes ▲0.5% for the Co-operative Party, as part of the Labour-Co-op alliance.)
Liberal	Herbert; Samuel	161	21	3	18	▼15	3.4	1,443,093	6.7	▼0.3
Ind. Labour Party	James; Maxton	17	4	Newly independent		▲4	0.7	139,577	0.7	—N/a
Nationalist	Thomas; Joseph Campbell	2	2	0	0	Steady	0.3	101,494	0.3	Steady
Independent; Republican	—N/a	3	0	Did not stand in 1931			—	56,833	0.3	—N/a
National; Independent	—N/a	2	2 (Note: Austin Hopkinson in Mossley and Ernest Graham-Little in London University.)	0	0	Steady	0.3	33,527	0.2	Steady
SNP	Alexander; MacEwen	8	0	0	0	Steady	—	29,517	0.1	Steady
Independent; Conservative	—N/a	2	0	Did not stand in 1931			—	27,721	0.1	—N/a
Communist	Harry; Pollitt	2	1	1 (Note: Willie Gallacher in West Fife.)	0	▲1	0.2	27,117	0.1	▼0.2
Independent; Labour	—N/a	1	0	0	0	Steady	—	14,867	0.1	Steady
Liverpool; Protestant	Harry Dixon Longbottom	1	0	0	0	Steady	—	6,677	0.0	Steady
National; Dividend	—N/a	2	0	New			—	6,734	0.0	New
Independent; Progressive	—N/a	1	0	New			—	6,421	0.0	New
Independent	—N/a	4	2 (Note: A. P. Herbert in Oxford University and Eleanor Rathbone in Combined English Universities.)	1 (Note: A. P. Herbert in Oxford University.)	0	▲1	0.3	6,165	0.0	Steady
People's; Peace	—N/a	1	0	New			—	3,763	0.0	New
Social Credit	John; Hargrave	1	0	New			—	3,642	0.0	New
Plaid Cymru	Saunders; Lewis	1	0	0	0	Steady	—	2,534	0.0	Steady
Independent; Liberal	—N/a	1	0	0	0	Steady	—	2,525	0.0	Steady
Agricultural; Defence	—N/a	1	0	New			—	1,771	0.0	New
Christian; Socialist	—N/a	1	0	New			—	1,480	0.0	New
Radical; Reform	—N/a	1	0	New			—	451	0.0	New
Total		1,348	615			0	100.0	21,997,054	100.0	0.0
Registered voters, and turnout								31,374,449 (Note: Including the electorate in uncontested constituencies.)	71.1 (Note: Adjusted for multi-member constituencies.)	▼5.3

=== Popular vote ===
Popular vote
Conservative	47.8%
Labour	38.0%
Liberal	6.7%
Liberal National	3.7%
National Labour	1.5%
Others	2.3%

Popular vote (coalitions)
National Gov.	53.3%
Labour	38.0%
Liberal	6.7%
Others	2.0%

=== Parliament ===
Parliament seats
Conservative	62.8%
Labour	25.0%
Liberal National	5.4%
Liberal	3.4%
National Labour	1.3%
Others	2.1%

Parliamentary seats (coalitions)
National Gov.	69.8%
Labour	25.0%
Liberal	3.4%
Others	1.8%

== Transfers of seats ==
- All comparisons are with the 1931 election.
  - In some cases the change is due to the MP defecting to the gaining party. Such circumstances are marked with a *.
  - In other circumstances the change is due to the seat having been won by the gaining party in a by-election in the intervening years, and then retained in 1935. Such circumstances are marked with a †.

To	From	No.	Seats
Ind. Labour Party	Conservative	1	Glasgow Camlachie
Ind. Labour Party	Labour	3	Glasgow Bridgeton* (Note: Elected as Independent Labour Party as part of the Labour Opposition in 1931.), Glasgow Shettleston*, Glasgow Gorbals*
Independent Labour Party gains:		4	
Communist	Conservative	1	Fife West
Communist gains:		1	
Labour	Liberal	11	Edinburgh East, South Shields, Durham, Bethnal Green North-East†, Lambeth North†, Whitechapel and St Georges, Middlesbrough East, Dewsbury, Colne Valley, Wrexham, Carmarthen
Labour	National Labour	6	Ilkeston, Seaham, Forest of Dean, Finsbury, Tottenham South, Bassetlaw
Labour	National Liberal	6	Western Isles, Dunfermline Burghs, Bishop Auckland, Consett, Shoreditch, Barnsley
Labour	National	3	Southwark Central, Burslem (Note: Sitting MP had defected to National Liberals.), Burnley
Labour	Conservative	79	Aberdeen North, Stirling and Falkirk, Clackmannan and Eastern Stirlingshire, Stirlingshire West, Kirkcaldy Burghs, Maryhill, Motherwell, Bothwell, Coatbridge, Springburn, Tradeston, Ayrshire South, Linlithgow, Whitehaven, Derbyshire North East, Chesterfield, Blaydon, Houghton-le-Spring, Jarrow, Barnard Castle, Sedgefield, East Ham S, Leyton West, Romford, Upton†, Bristol South, Kingston upon Hull Central, Kingston upon Hull East, Ashton-under-Lyne, Farnworth, Ardwick, Clayton, Gorton, Platting, Rochdale, Everton, West Toxteth, Newton, St Helens, Brigg, Battersea North, Camberwell North, Deptford, Hackney Central, Hackney South, Hammersmith North†, Islington South, Islington West, Rotherhithe, Southwark South East, Mile End, Willesden West, Edmonton, Tottenham North, Morpeth, Nottingham West, Cannock, Hanley, Kingswinford, Leek, Stoke, Wednesbury†, West Bromwich, Nuneaton, Shipley, Wakefield†, Sheffield Park, Rotherham†, Bradford Central, Keighley, Pontefract, Hillsborough, Attercliffe, Brightside, Penistone, Leeds South, Doncaster, Batley and Morley, Nelson and Colne
Labour gains:		105	
Liberal	Conservative	3	Cumberland North, Barnstaple, Berwick-upon-Tweed
Liberal gains:		3	
National Labour	Liberal	1	Leicester West
National Liberal	Liberal	3	Walsall*, Combined Scottish Universities (one of three), Dumfriesshire†
National Liberal	Conservative	2	Sunderland (one of two), Oldham (one of two)
National Liberal gains:		5	
National	Conservative	1	Brecon and Radnor
Conservative	Liberal	4	Orkney and Shetland, Banff, Bodmin, Darwen
Conservative	National Liberal	1	Flintshire (Note: Sitting MP had defected to Liberals.)
Conservative	National	1	Southampton* (Note: Sitting MP became official Conservative Party candidate in this election.)
Conservative gains:		6	
Independent	Conservative	1	Oxford University (one of two)
Independent gains:		1	

== Constituency results ==
These are available on the Political Science Resources Elections Database, a link to which is given below.

== See also ==
- List of MPs elected in the 1935 United Kingdom general election
- 1935 United Kingdom general election in England
- 1935 United Kingdom general election in Scotland
- 1935 United Kingdom general election in Wales
- 1935 United Kingdom general election in Northern Ireland
- List of MPs for constituencies in Wales (1935–1945)

== Manifestos ==
- 1935 Conservative manifesto
- 1935 Labour manifesto
- 1935 Liberal manifesto
