= Thomas Sinclair (politician, 1857–1940) =

British politician (1857–1940)

Thomas Sinclair PC (Ire) MP

Member of Parliament for Queen's University of Belfast
- In office 6 December 1923 – 18 September 1940
- Preceded by: William Whitla
- Succeeded by: Douglas Savory

Personal details
- Born: 17 December 1857 Belfast, Ireland
- Died: 25 November 1940 (aged 82) Belfast, Northern Ireland
- Party: Ulster Unionist Party
- Spouse: Never married
- Education: Queen's College Belfast; Royal University of Ireland
- Profession: Surgeon

Thomas Sinclair, PC (Ire) (17 December 1857 – 25 November 1940) was an Irish unionist politician.

Sinclair studied at Queen's University, Belfast before working as a surgeon. He was elected to the Senate of Northern Ireland on its creation in 1921.

He was elected as an Ulster Unionist Party Member of Parliament (MP) for Queen's University of Belfast at the 1923 United Kingdom general election. From 1935 to 1937, Sinclair served as Deputy Speaker of the Senate of Northern Ireland. He resigned his Westminster seat on 18 September 1940 by appointment as Steward of the Chiltern Hundreds. but held his Senate seat until his death in November.

The businessman and politician Thomas Sinclair was a relative of Sinclair.

Parliament of the United Kingdom
Preceded by William Whitla	Member of Parliament for Queen's University of Belfast; 1923–1940	Succeeded by Douglas Savory
