= 1935 Labour Party leadership election =

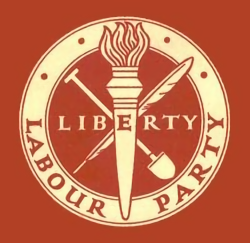
- 26 November 1935
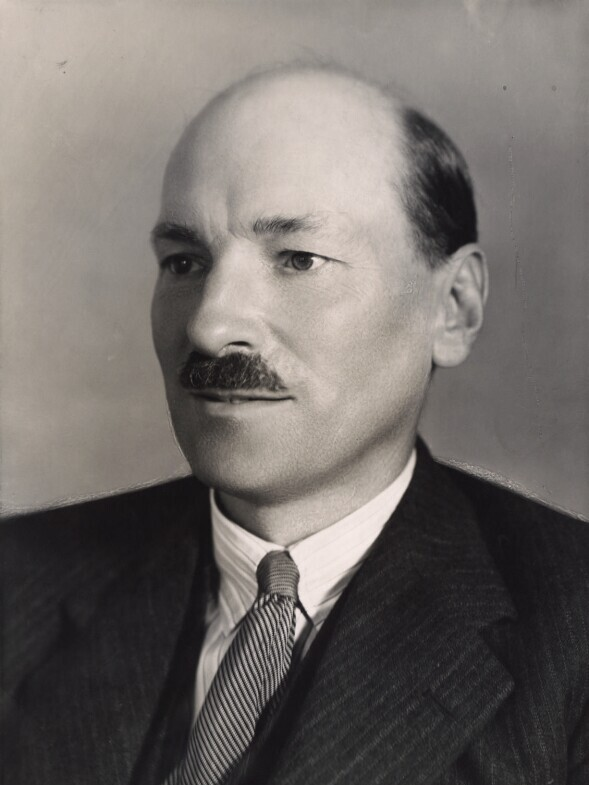

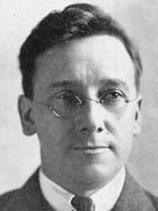

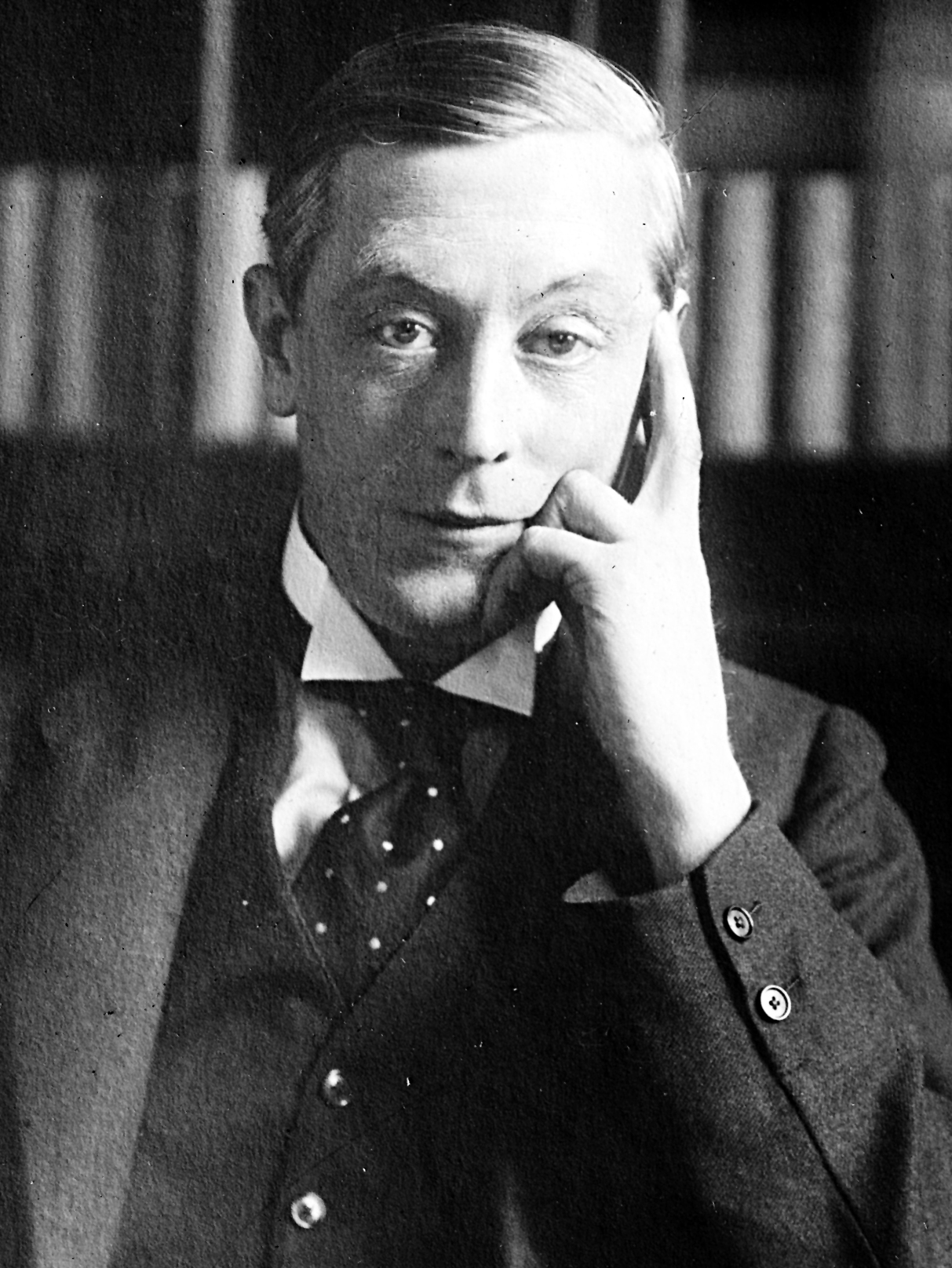
Candidate	Clement Attlee	Herbert Morrison	Arthur Greenwood
First ballot	58 (43.0%)	44 (32.6%)	33 (24.4%)
Second ballot	88 (64.7%)	48 (35.3%)	Eliminated
Leader before election
Clement Attlee (interim)
Elected Leader
Clement Attlee

The 1935 Labour Party leadership election took place on 26 November 1935 when Herbert Morrison and Arthur Greenwood challenged incumbent interim party leader Clement Attlee.

== Background ==
In early October 1935, at the annual party conference the NEC had tabled a resolution calling for sanctions against Italy who had just invaded Abyssinia. This was opposed by the party's leader George Lansbury but was nevertheless passed with the support of the trade unions. Feeling that a Christian pacifist could no longer lead the party following this defeat, Lansbury resigned as leader on 8 October. Realising the disunity of the opposition, Prime Minister Stanley Baldwin called a general election on 19 October to be held on 14 November. With no time to choose a new leader, Deputy Leader Clement Attlee (who had been acting leader since Lansbury resigned) was appointed as interim leader on 25 October to contest the election.

Following the election, with the Labour Party now having roughly three times as many MPs as in the 1931–5 Parliament, both Herbert Morrison and Arthur Greenwood stood in the annual election for leader, feeling that Attlee's appointment had only been intended as an interim measure. Morrison had not been an MP at the time of the October appointment, whilst Greenwood had declined to offer himself as a candidate then because he was strongly associated with trade union leaders such as Ernest Bevin, who were widely regarded as the reasons for forcing Lansbury to resign, a move that the vast majority of Labour MPs opposed.

== Candidates ==
- Clement Attlee, incumbent interim Leader of the Labour Party, Member of Parliament for Limehouse
- Arthur Greenwood, former Minister for Health, Member of Parliament for Wakefield
- Herbert Morrison, Leader of the London County Council, Member of Parliament for Hackney South

== Results ==
The contest took place on 26 November 1935:

=== Round 1 ===
Name	Votes	%
Clement Attlee	58	43.0
Herbert Morrison	44	32.6
Arthur Greenwood ✗	33	24.4

As the lowest-placed candidate, Greenwood was eliminated from the race.

=== Round 2 ===
A second round then took place:

Name	Votes	%
Clement Attlee ✓	88	64.7
Herbert Morrison	48	35.3

With a clear majority, Attlee retained the party leadership.

=== Deputy leadership ballot ===
Greenwood was subsequently elected unopposed as Deputy Leader.

== Aftermath ==
Herbert Morrison later claimed that he was denied the leadership of the Labour Party in the 1935 election by the votes of Labour MPs who were members of New Welcome Lodge. Morrison's backer Hugh Dalton made similar claims, and went further than Morrison by claiming to have been shown the summons for the meeting at which the voting was decided. Dalton believed that the members of New Welcome Lodge backed Arthur Greenwood, who was a member of the lodge, and then backed Clement Attlee in order to block Morrison.
