= 1931 United Kingdom general election in Wales =

- 27 October 1931

All 36 Welsh seats to the House of Commons
- Turnout: 79.3% (▼3.1 pp)
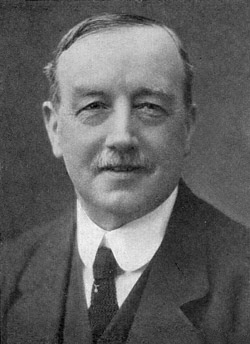

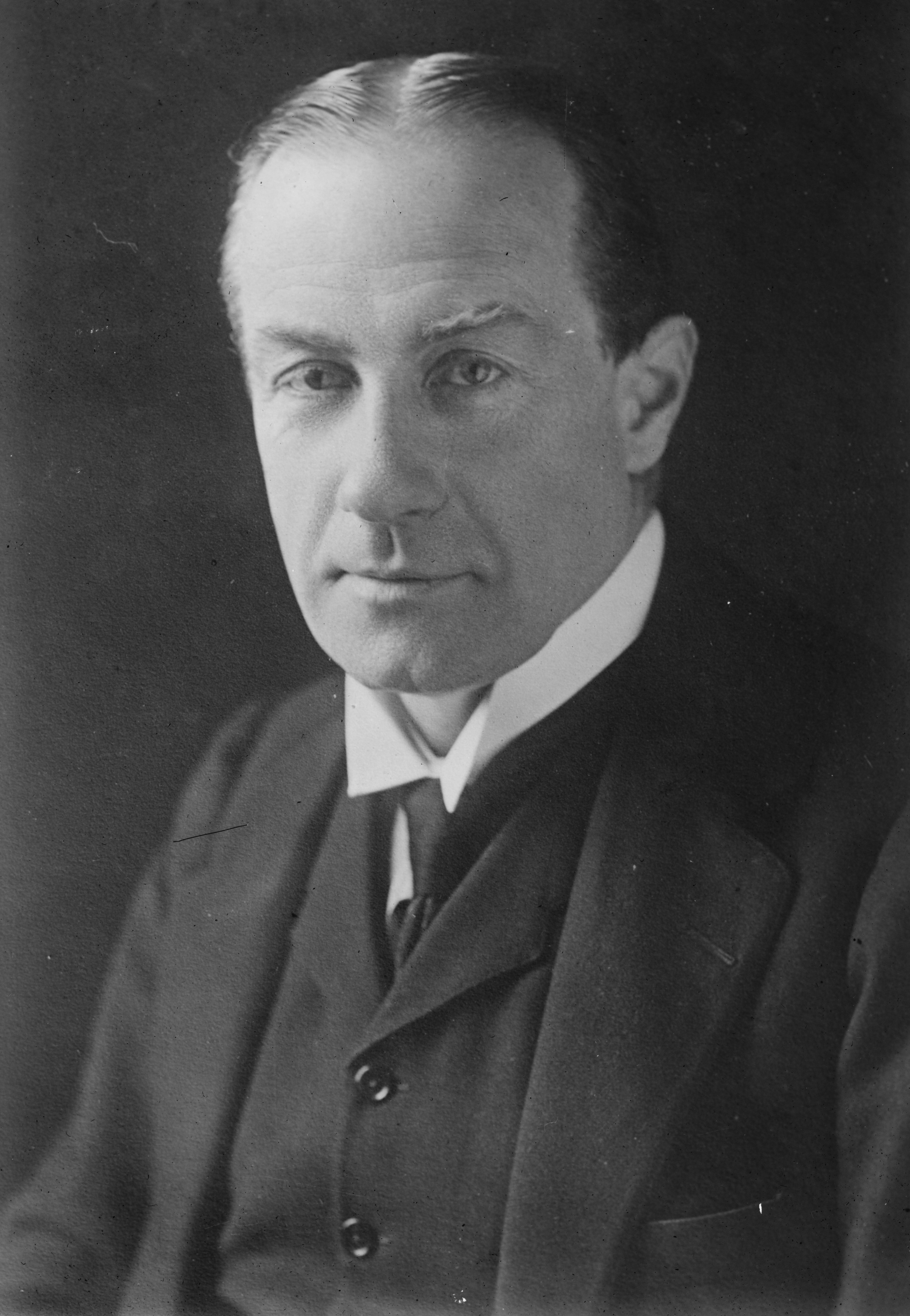

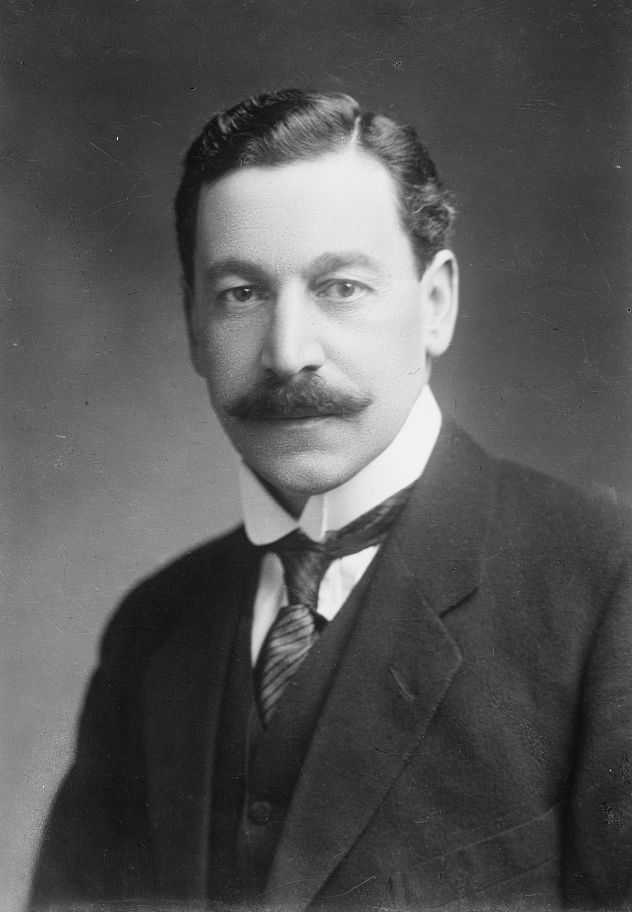

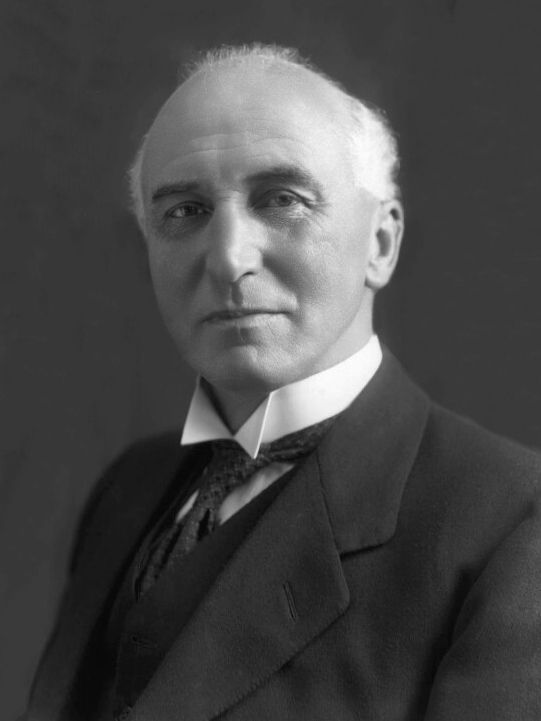

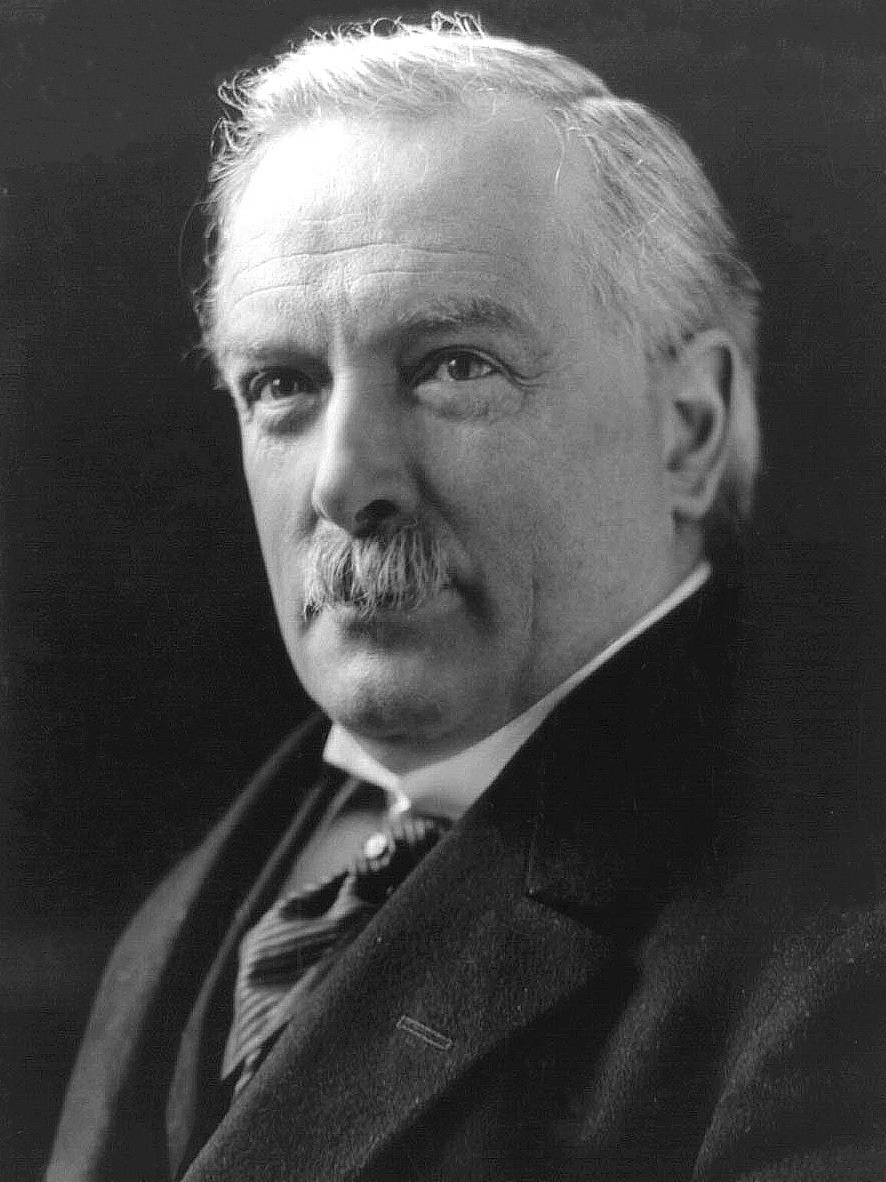

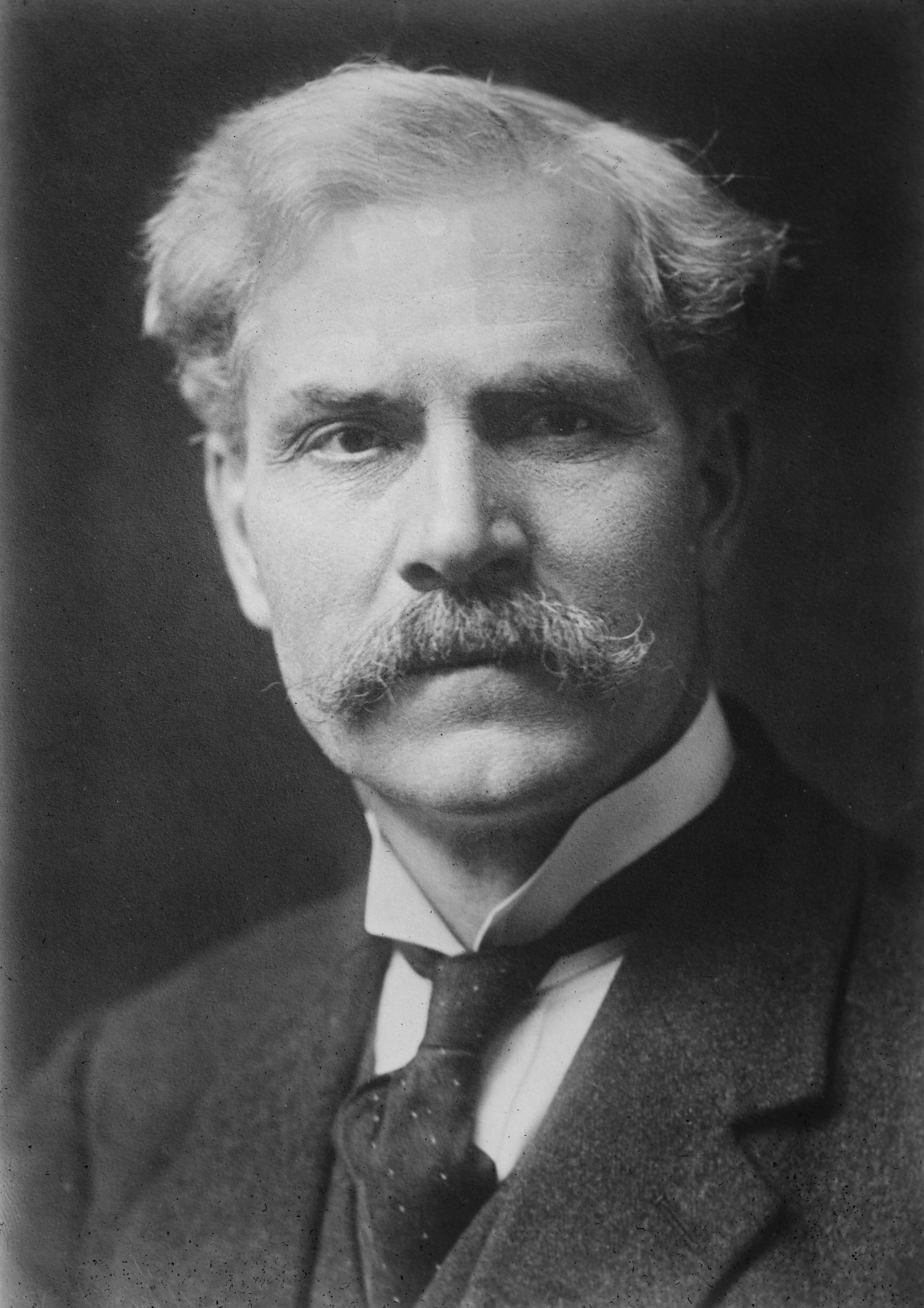
	First party	Second party	Third party
Leader	Arthur Henderson	Stanley Baldwin	Herbert Samuel
Party	Labour	Conservative	Liberal
Alliance		National Government	National Government
Leader since	1 September 1931	23 May 1923	4 November 1931
Leader's seat	Burnley (Lost seat)	Bewdley	Darwen
Last election	25 seats, (Note: Combined results for county, borough and university seats.) 43.9%	1 seat, 22.0%	10 seats, 33.5%
Seats won	16 (Note: Figure is for all Welsh candidates in the Labour Opposition in 1931)	6	5
Seat change	▼9	▲5	▼5
Popular vote	479,547 (Note: Total and percentage votes given here are for territorial constituencies only.)	240,861	157,472
Percentage	44.1%	22.1%	14.5%
Swing	▲0.2 pp	▲0.1 pp	▼19.0 pp
	Fourth party	Fifth party	Sixth party
Leader	John Simon	David Lloyd George	Ramsay MacDonald
Party	Liberal National	Independent Liberals	National Labour
Alliance	National Government		National Government
Leader since	5 October 1931	1931	24 August 1931
Leader's seat	Spen Valley	Caernarvon Boroughs	Seaham
Last election	Did not contest	Did not contest	Did not contest
Seats won	4	4	1
Seat change	▲4	▲4	▲1
Popular vote	75,717	71,539	24,120
Percentage	7.0%	6.6%	2.2%
Swing	New party	New party	New party

On Tuesday 27 October 1931, the 1931 United Kingdom general election was held in Wales, to elect all 615 members of the House of Commons, with 36 constituencies being in Wales. 35 seats represented territorial constituencies contested under the first past the post electoral system, and one additional seat represented the University of Wales which was also contested under the first past the post electoral system. It was the last UK general election not to take place on a Thursday.

In this election, the parties forming the National Government across the United Kingdom won 67 per cent of the popular vote and over 90 per cent of the seats in the House of Commons. In Wales, despite the National Government obtaining more votes than the Labour Opposition, the combined Labour Opposition still held the most seats.

== Candidates ==
Below is a table summarising the candidates of the 1931 general election in Wales, excluding those in the University of Wales constituency.

Affiliation	Candidates
Labour Party	29
Conservative and Unionist Party	14
Liberal Party	10
Liberal National Party	5 (Note: The candidates that stood were Henry Morris-Jones in Denbigh, Frederick Llewellyn-Jones in Flintshire, Clement Davies in Montgomeryshire, Thomas Keens in Pontypool and Lewis Jones in Swansea West.)
Independent Liberals	4 (Note: The candidates that stood were Megan Lloyd George in Anglesey, Goronwy Owen in Caernarvonshire, David Lloyd George in Caernarvon Boroughs and Gwilym Lloyd George in Pembrokeshire.)
Communist Party of Great Britain	3 (Note: The candidates that stood were John Ross Campbell in Ogmore, Arthur Horner in Rhondda East and John Leigh Davies in Rhondda West.)
New Party	2 (Note: The candidates that stood were Sellick Davies in Merthyr and William Lowell in Pontypridd.)
National Labour Organisation	1 (Note: Incumbent sitting Labour Member of Parliament Ernest Bennett, who defected to National Labour, stood in Cardiff Central.)
Independent Labour Party	1 (Note: Candidate R. C. Wallhead, whose support by the Labour Party was withdrawn, stood in Merthyr.)
Independent Labour	1 (Note: Candidate Thomas Mardy Jones stood in Pontypridd.)
Plaid Cymru	1 (Note: Candidate John Edward Daniel stood in Caernarvonshire.)
National Independent	1 (Note: This category of candidates refers to independents that supported the National Government coalition, labelling themselves as National Independents or National candidates, but were not themselves a part of the National Government. Candidate W. P. O. Evans stood in Caernarvonshire.)
Total	72

== Analysis ==
=== Labour Opposition ===
Although the National Coalition parties polled with the greater vote share combined in Wales, and formed the Government of the United Kingdom following the election, the combined Labour opposition retained its position as the largest party by seats in Wales.

Former chair of the Independent Labour Party R. C. Wallhead had his support withdrawn by the Labour Party in his safe Labour seat of Merthyr. Wallhead won the seat as an Independent Labour Party candidate, being only one of five such candidates to retain his seat. (Note: The four other candidates independent to the Labour Party to retain their seats were in Scotland, with three others also being part of the Independent Labour Party, and David Kirkwood winning his seat under the label of Independent Labour.) He remained part of the Labour Opposition to the National Government despite not being part of the party. Wallhead would, however, Wallhead resign from the Independent Labour Party and rejoined the Labour in 1933. Wallhead's later death in 1934, however, also caused the 1934 Merthyr by-election with Labour candidate S. O. Davies retaking the seat. Overall, the Labour opposition lost a total of nine seats in Wales.

=== National Government ===
The Conservative Party, as the largest party of the National Government, gained Newport, Brecon and Radnorshire, Llandaff and Barry, Cardiff East and Cardiff South from the Labour Party. Notably, Cardiff East had switched from the Liberals initially holding the seat at its creation in 1918, to the Conservative Party in 1922, to the Liberal Party in 1923, returning again to the Conservatives in 1924 United Kingdom general election, then being gained by the Labour Party in 1929; however, the seat would again return to the Conservative Party in this election, and be held by the party until the 1942 Cardiff East by-election.

The newly formed Liberal National Party, which had split from the Liberal Party and which were also part of the National Government, gained Denbigh, Flintshire and Montgomeryshire from the Liberal Party by way of incumbent members of the Liberals defecting to the new party and winning the seats. Of those seats, both Clement Davies in Montgomeryshire and Henry Morris-Jones in Denbigh ran unopposed. The party also gained Swansea West from Labour. The fifth seat the party contested was Pontypool, however the candidate Thomas Keens was unsuccessful.

Additionally, the newly formed National Labour led by Prime Minister Ramsay MacDonald gained Cardiff Central. This was the only seat in Wales contested by National Labour. The incumbent Member of Parliament for the seat, former Labour member Ernest Bennett, defected and won the seat in the election.

=== Liberals and Independent Liberals ===
The Liberal Party, which had joined the National Coalition, gained Wrexham and Carmarthen from the Labour Party, as well as Liberal Ernest Evans again retaining his seat in the University of Wales constituency.

However, due to David Lloyd George splitting from the party in opposition to the Liberal Party being in National Government, the Independent Liberals, who were incumbent Members of Parliament and primarily members of his family, gained four seats from the Liberal Party. These were Lloyd George himself in Caernarvon Boroughs, his daughter and first female Member of Parliament for Wales Megan Lloyd George in Anglesey and his son Gwilym Lloyd George in Pembrokeshire. It also included Goronwy Owen in Caernarvonshire, whose wife Gladwyn was the sister of Edna, the wife of Gwilym Lloyd George. The Independent Liberal group only won seats in Wales, despite two other candidates running in English constituencies. (Note: These candidates were Edgar Wallace in Blackpool and Frank Owen in Hereford.)

As a result, the Liberal party was decreased to just holding five seats in Wales, with Lloyd George's Independent Liberals holding four.

== County and borough constituency results ==
Below is a table summarising the constituency results of the 1931 general election in Wales, excluding the result in the University of Wales constituency.

Party	Seats					Aggregate votes		
Party	Total	Gains	Losses	Net	Of total (%)	Total	Of total (%)	Change (%)
Labour Opposition (Total)	16	0	9	▼9	45.7	479,547	44.1	▲0.2
Labour	15	0	10	▼10	42.8	454,924	41.8	▼2.1
Ind. Labour Party	1 (Note: R. C. Wallhead in Merthyr.)	New		▲1	2.9	24,623	2.3	New
National Government (Total)	15	New		▲5	42.9	498,170	45.8	New
Conservative	6	5	0	▲5	17.1	240,861	22.1	▲0.1
Liberal	4	2	7	▼5	11.4	157,472	14.5	▼19.0
Liberal National	4	New		▲4	11.4	75,717	7.0	New
National Labour	1	New		▲1	2.9	24,120	2.2	New
Independent Liberals	4	New		▲4	11.4	71,539	6.6	New
Communist	0	0	0	Steady	—	17,754	1.6	▲1.0
New Party	0	New			—	11,300	1.0	New
National Independent	0	New			—	7,990	0.7	New
Plaid Cymru	0	0	0	Steady	—	1,136	0.1	▲0.1
Independent Labour	0	Did not stand in 1931			—	1,110	0.1	—N/a
Total	35			0	100.0	1,088,546	100.0	0.0
Registered voters, and turnout						1,373,253 (Note: Electorate in contested constituencies. The total electorate was 1,625,118.)	79.3	▼3.1

=== Popular vote ===
Popular vote
Labour Opp.	44.1%
Conservative	22.1%
Liberal	14.5%
Liberal National	7.0%
Ind. Liberals	6.6%
National Labour	2.2%
Plaid Cymru	0.1%
Others	3.4%

Popular vote (coalitions)
National Gov.	45.8%
Labour Opp.	44.1%
Ind. Liberals	6.6%
Plaid Cymru	0.1%
Others	3.4%

=== Parliament seats ===
Parliament seats
Labour Opp.	45.7%
Conservative	17.1%
Liberal	11.4%
Liberal National	11.4%
Ind. Liberals	11.4%
National Labour	2.9%

Parliament seats (coalitions)
Labour Opp.	45.7%
National Gov.	42.9%
Ind. Liberals	11.4%

== University of Wales result ==
Below is a table summarising the 1931 constituency results for seat of the University of Wales constituency. The Liberal Party retained the seat, bringing the total seats of the Liberal Party to five out of the possible 36.

General election 1931: University of Wales
Party	Candidate	Votes	%	±%
Liberal	Ernest Evans	2,229	75.4	+11.9
Plaid Cymru	Saunders Lewis	914	24.6	New
Majority		1,315	50.8	+12.2
Turnout		3,143	61.4	−13.0
Liberal hold		Swing		

== See also ==
- 1931 United Kingdom general election in England
- 1931 United Kingdom general election in Scotland
- 1931 United Kingdom general election in Northern Ireland
- List of MPs for constituencies in Wales (1931–1935)
