= 1931 United Kingdom general election in England =

- 27 October 1931

All 492 English seats to the House of Commons
- Turnout: 76.1% (▼0.5 pp)
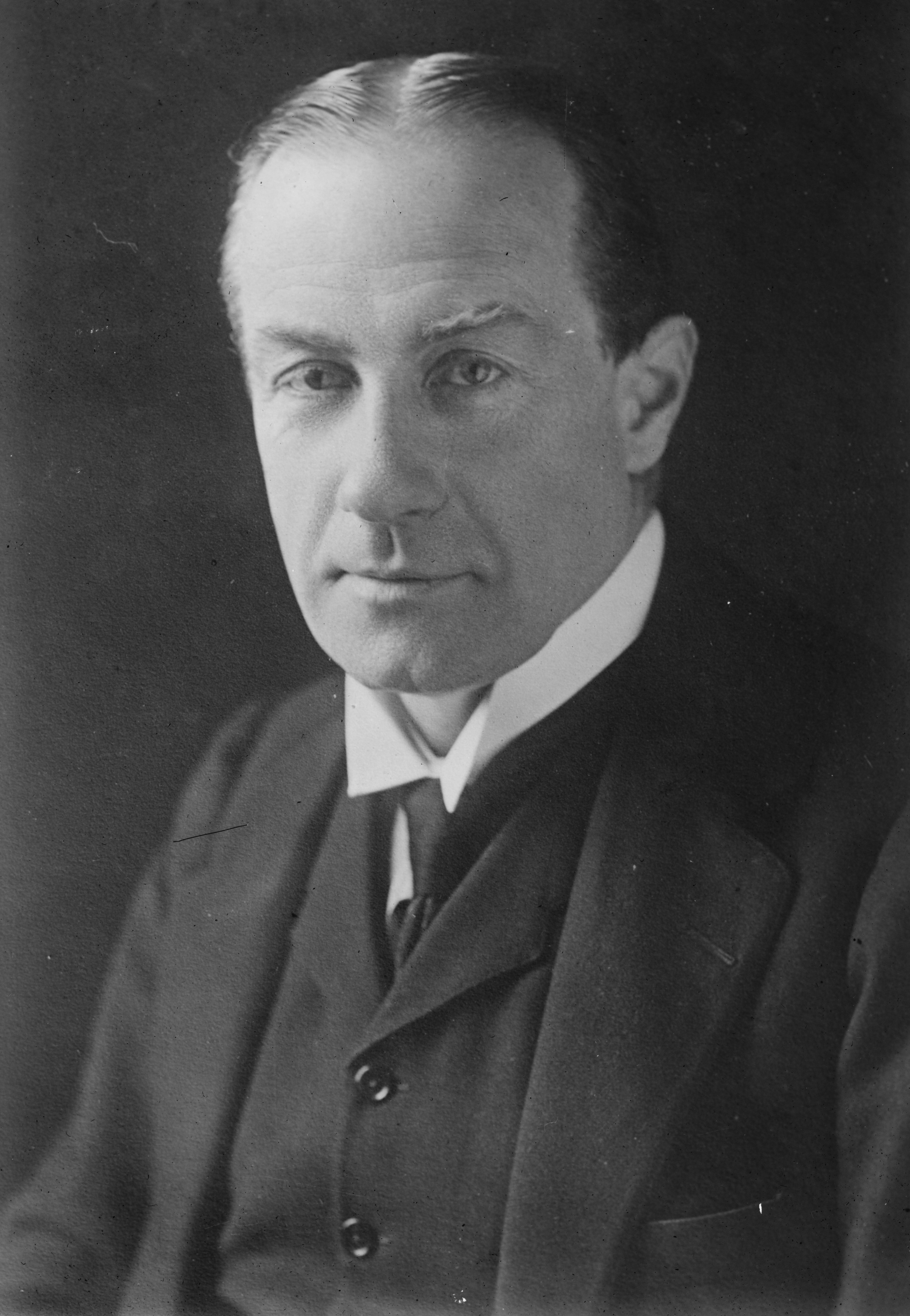

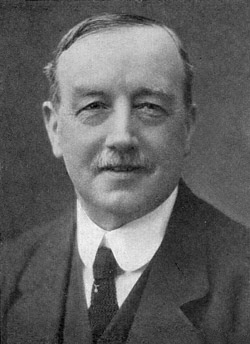

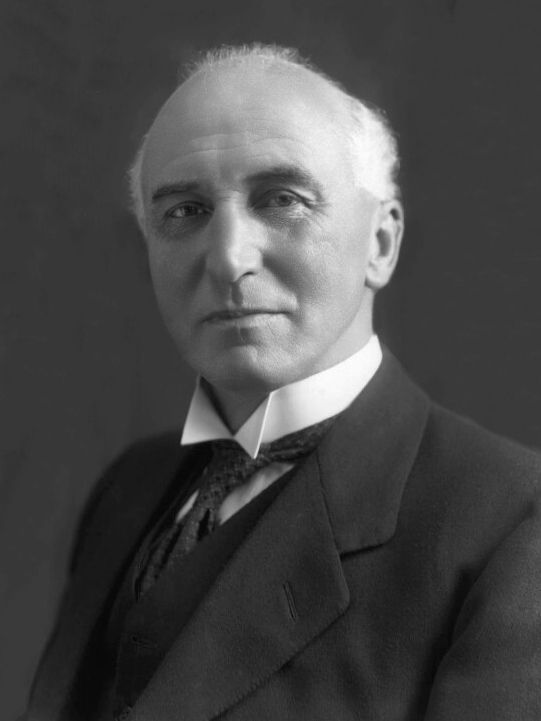

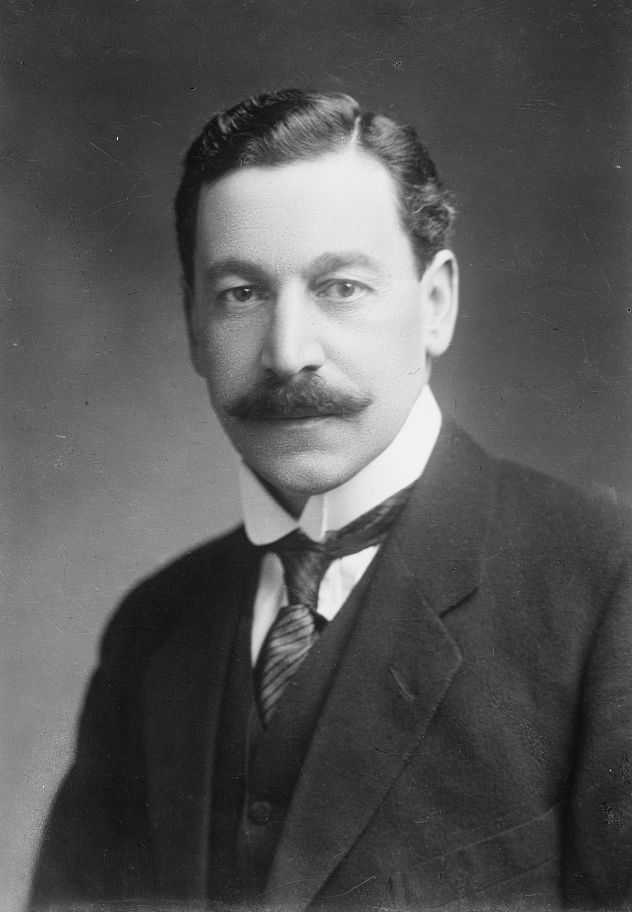

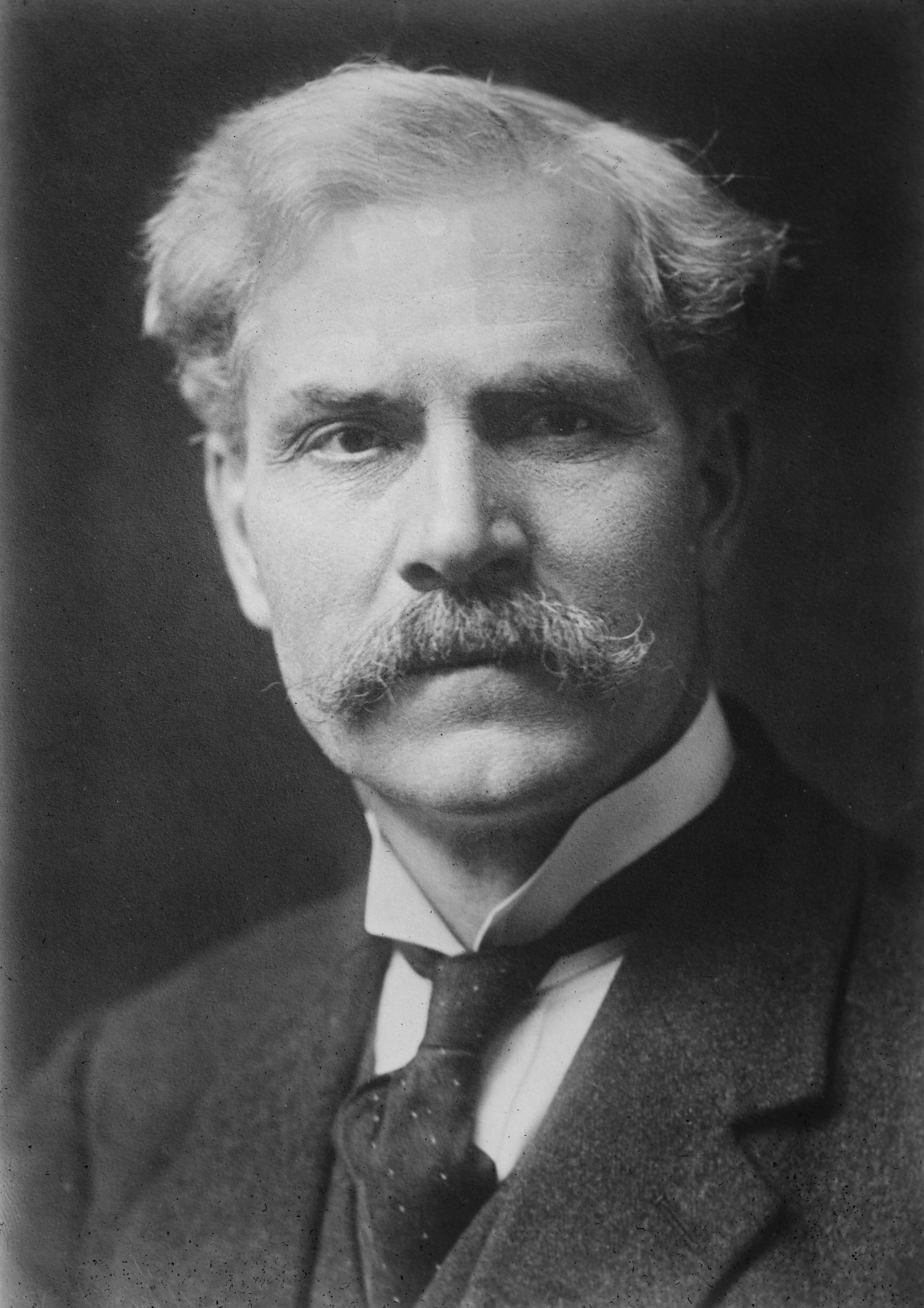
	First party	Second party	Third party
Leader	Stanley Baldwin	Arthur Henderson	John Simon
Party	Conservative	Labour	Liberal National
Alliance	National Government		National Government
Leader since	23 May 1923	1 September 1931	5 October 1931
Leader's seat	Bewdley	Burnley (Lost seat)	Spen Valley
Last election	226 seats, (Note: Combined results for county, borough and university seats.) 38.8%	226 seats, 36.9%	Did not contest
Seats won	403 (Note: Figure includes Speaker of the House of Commons Edward FitzRoy in Daventry.)	29 (Note: Figure is for all English candidates in the Labour Opposition in 1931)	23
Seat change	▲177	▼197	▲23
Popular vote	10,453,349 (Note: Total and percentage votes given here are for territorial constituencies only.)	5,464,425	632,155
Percentage	57.8%	30.2%	3.4%
Swing	▲19.0 pp	▼6.7 pp	New party
	Fourth party	Fifth party
Leader	Herbert Samuel	Ramsay MacDonald
Party	Liberal	National Labour
Alliance	National Government	National Government
Leader since	4 November 1931	24 August 1931
Leader's seat	Darwen	Seaham
Last election	35 seats, 23.6%	Did not contest
Seats won	19	11
Seat change	▼16	▲11
Popular vote	1,007,510	292,688
Percentage	5.8%	1.5%
Swing	▼17.8 pp	New party

On Thursday 27 October 1931, the 1931 United Kingdom general election was held in England, to elect all 615 members of the House of Commons, with 492 constituencies being in England. 485 seats represented territorial constituencies contested under the first past the post electoral system, and seven additional seats represented the university constituencies. Three university constituencies returned two members through the single transferable vote electoral system and one returned one member by the first past the post system.

In this election, the parties forming the National Government across the United Kingdom won 67 per cent of the popular vote and over 90 per cent of the seats in the House of Commons.

== Candidates ==
Below is a table summarising the candidates of the 1931 general election in England, excluding those in the university constituencies.

Affiliation	Candidates
Conservative and Unionist Party	427
Labour Party	419 (Note: Includes 15 Co-operative Party candidates, as part of the Labour-Co-op alliance.)
Liberal Party	85
Liberal National Party	28
National Labour Organisation	17
New Party	16
Communist Party of Great Britain	15
Independent Labour Party	9
National	4 (Note: The candidates that stood were Gordon Campbell in Burnley, William Allen in Burslem, William Craven-Ellis in Southampton and Ian Horobin in Southwark Central.)
Independent	2 (Note: The candidates that stood were John Strachey in Birmingham Aston and F. Abraham in Liverpool Scotland.)
Independent Liberals	2 (Note: The candidates that stood were Edgar Wallace in Blackpool and Frank Owen in Hereford.)
Commonwealth Land Party	2 (Note: The candidates that stood were Arthur Rowland-Entwhistle in Burslem and James Peace in Hanley.)
National Independent	1 (Note: This category of candidates refers to independents that supported the National Government coalition, labelling themselves as National Independents or National candidates, but were not themselves a part of the National Government. Candidate Austin Hopkinson stood in Mossley.)
Independent Liberal	1 (Note: Candidate Frank Sykes in Halifax.)
Independent Labour	1 (Note: Candidate William Brown stood in Wolverhampton West.)
Liverpool Protestant Party	1 (Note: Leader Harry Dixon Longbottom stood in Liverpool Kirkdale.)
Agricultural Party	1 (Note: Candidate John Alexander Whitehead stood in Isle of Ely.)
Workers	1 (Note: Candidate Reginald Bridgeman stood in Uxbridge.)
Total	1,032

== Seat summary ==
Below is a table summarising the total number of seats, gains and losses for each party in both the territorial county and borough constituencies and the English university constituencies.

Party	Seats				
Party	Total	Gains	Losses	Net	Of all (%)
National Government (Total)	460	New		▲199	93.5
Conservative	403	177	0	▲177	81.9
Liberal National	23	New		▲23	4.7
Liberal	19	11	27	▼16	3.9
National Labour	11	New		▲11	2.2
National	4	New		▲4	0.8
Labour Opposition (Total)	29	1	198	▼197	5.9
Labour	29	1	198	▼197	5.9
Ind. Labour Party	0	Did not stand in 1929			—
National Independent	2	New		▲2	0.4
Independent	1	0	3	▼3	0.2
Other non-contested	0	—N/a		▼1	—
Total	492				

== County and borough constituency results ==
Below is a table summarising the constituency results of the 1931 general election in England, excluding the result in the university constituencies.

Party>	Seats					Aggregate votes		
Party>	Total	Gains	Losses	Net	Of all (%)	Total	Of all (%) (Note: Adjusted for multi-member constituencies.)	Change (%)
National Government (Total)	455	New		▲199	93.8	12,485,895	69.1	New
Conservative	398	177	0	▲177	81.9	10,453,349	57.8	▲19.0
Liberal	19	11	27	▼16	3.9	1,007,510	5.8	▼17.8
Liberal National	23	New		▲23	4.7	632,155	3.4	New
National Labour	11	New		▲11	2.3	292,688	1.5	New
National	4 (Note: Gordon Campbell in Burnley, William Allen in Burslem, William Craven-Ellis in Southampton and Ian Horobin in Southwark Central.)	New		▲4	0.8	100,193	0.6	New
Labour Opposition (Total)	29	1	198	▼197	6.0	5,464,425	30.2	▼6.7
Labour	29	1 (Note: David Logan in Liverpool Scotland.)	198	▼197	6.0	5,347,584	29.6	▼7.3
Ind. Labour Party	0	Did not stand in 1929			—	116,841	0.6	—N/a
Independent Liberals	0	New			—	31,989	0.2	New
Communist	0	0	0	Steady	—	21,452	0.1	Steady
New Party	0	New			—	20,721	0.1	New
Independent Labour	0	0	0	Steady	—	17,090	0.1	▲0.1
National Independent	1 (Note: Austin Hopkinson in Mossley.)	New		▲1	0.2	17,017	0.1	New
Liverpool Protestant	0	New			—	7,834	0.0	New
Agricultural	0	New			—	6,993	0.0	New
Independent	0	0	2 (Note: Robert Newman in Exeter and Thomas Robinson in Stretford.)	▼2	—	3,335	0.0	▼0.4
Independent Liberal	0	0	0	Steady	—	2,578	0.0	▼0.1
Workers	0	New			—	2,358	0.0	New
Commonwealth Land	0	New			—	1,347	0.0	New
Other non-contested	0	—N/a		▼1 (Note: Irish Nationalist T. P. O'Connor in Liverpool Scotland.)	—	0	0.0	—N/a
Total	485			0	100.0	18,083,034	100.0	0.0
Registered voters, and turnout						22,763,020 (Note: Electorate in contested constituencies. The total electorate was 24,423,766.)	76.1	▼0.5

=== Popular vote ===
Popular vote
Conservative	57.8%
Labour Opp.	30.2%
Liberal	5.8%
Liberal National	3.4%
National Labour	1.5%
National	0.6%
Other	0.7%

Popular vote (coalitions)
National Gov.	69.1%
Labour Opp.	30.2%
Other	0.7%

=== Parliament Seats ===
Parliament seats
Conservative	81.9%
Labour Opp.	6.0%
Liberal National	4.7%
Liberal	3.9%
National Labour	2.3%
National	0.8%
Other	0.2%

Parliament seats (coalitions)
National Gov.	93.8%
Labour Opp.	6.0%
Other	0.2%

== University constituency results ==
=== University results summary ===
Below is a table summarising the seats and vote share of the English university constituencies in the 1931 general election.

Party	Seats				First preference votes	
Party	Total	Gains	Losses	Net	Total	Of all (%)
National Government (Total)	5	New		Steady	8,140	32.2
Conservative	5	0	0	Steady	5,381	21.3
National Labour	0	New			2,759	10.9
Liberal National	0	Did not stand			0	0.0
Liberal	0	Did not stand			0	0.0
National Independent	0	Did not stand			0	0.0
National Independent	1	New		▲1	8,461	33.5
Independent	1	0	1	▼1	5,096	20.1
Independent National	0	New			3,134	12.4
New Party	0	New			461	1.8
Total	7				25,292	

=== Cambridge University ===
The constituency for Cambridge University returned two Members of Parliament using the single transferable vote electoral system. The electorate consisted of graduates of the university.

General election 1931: Cambridge University (2 seats)
Party	Candidate	Votes	%	±%
Conservative	Godfrey Wilson	Unopposed	N/A	N/A
Conservative	John Withers	Unopposed	N/A	N/A
Conservative hold				

=== Combined English Universities ===
The Combined English Universities constituency, which represented effectively all red brick universities and Durham University, returned two Members of Parliament using the single transferable vote electoral system. The electorate consisted of graduates of the university.

General Election 1931: Combined English Universities (2 seats)
Party	Candidate	FPv%	Count			
Party	Candidate	FPv%	1	2	3	4
Independent	Eleanor Rathbone	37.2	5,096			
Conservative	Reginald Craddock	26.5	3,633	3,685	3,754	4,858
National Labour	William Jowitt	20.1	2,759	3,003	3,207	3,632
Conservative	Herbert Williams	12.8	1,748	1,819	1,922	eliminated
New Party	Harold Nicolson	3.4	461	623	eliminated	
Electorate: 19,109 Valid: 13,697 Quota: 4,567 Turnout: 71.7%

=== London University ===
The constituency for London University returned one Member of Parliament using the First-past-the-post electoral system. The electorate consisted of graduates of the university.

General election 1931: London University
Party	Candidate	Votes	%	±%
National Independent	Ernest Graham-Little	8,461	72.97	+19.47
Independent National	Archibald Church	3,134	27.03	+27.03
Majority		5,327	45.94	+19.09
Turnout		11,595	70.27	−0.25
Registered electors		16,501		
National gain from Independent				

=== Oxford University ===
The constituency for Oxford University returned two Members of Parliament using the single transferable vote electoral system. The electorate consisted of graduates of the university.

General election 1931: Oxford University (2 seats)
Party	Candidate	Votes	%	±%
Conservative	Lord Hugh Cecil	Unopposed	N/A	N/A
Conservative	Charles Oman	Unopposed	N/A	N/A

== See also ==
- 1931 United Kingdom general election in Scotland
- 1931 United Kingdom general election in Wales
- 1931 United Kingdom general election in Northern Ireland
