= Leader of the Labour Party (UK) =

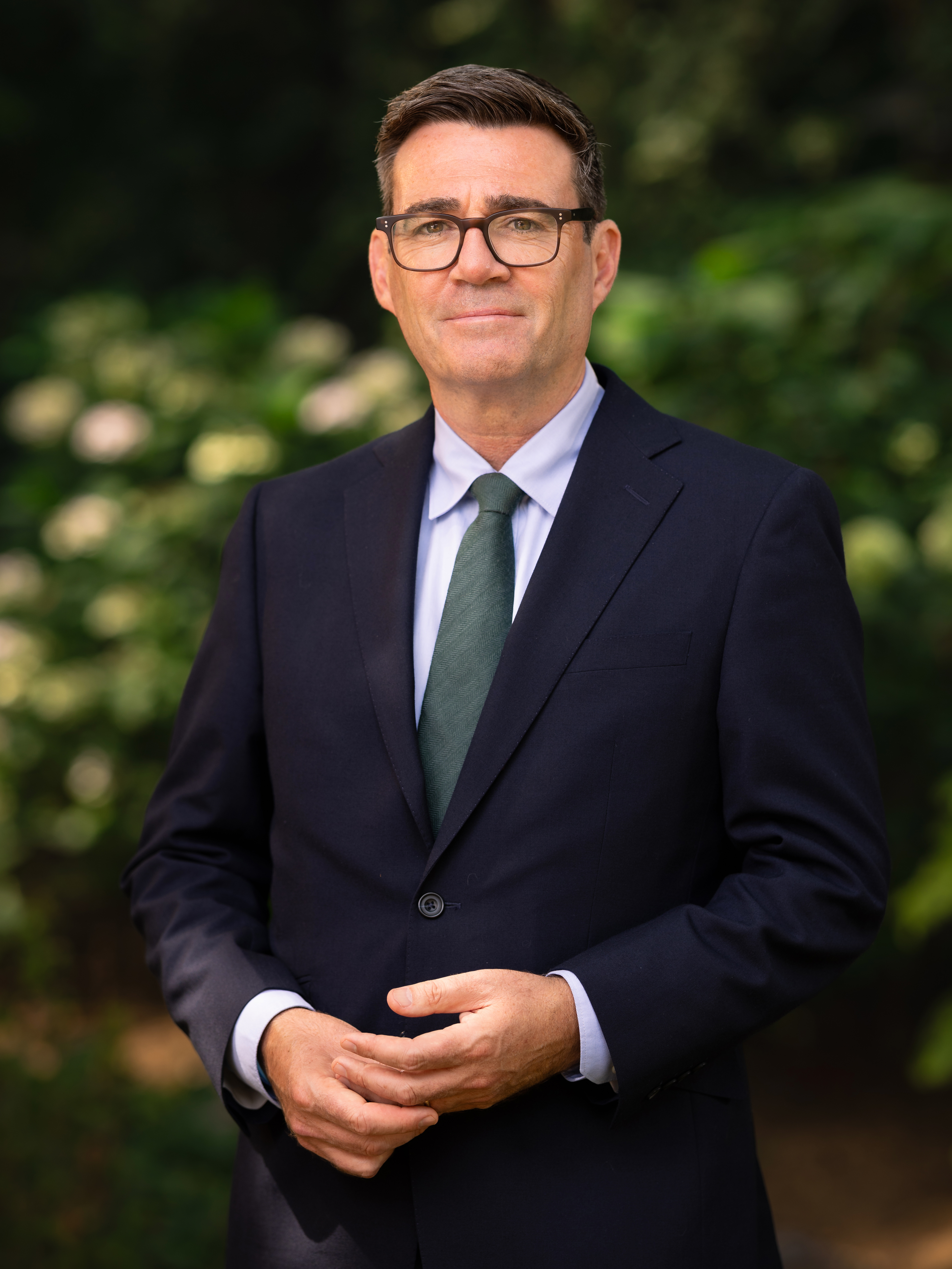
- Incumbent; Andy Burnham since 17 July 2026
- Status: Party leader
- Member of: National Executive Committee
- Term length: No fixed term
- Precursor: Chair of the PLP
- Inaugural holder: Keir Hardie
- Formation: 17 January 1906
- Deputy: Deputy Leader of the Labour Party

The leader of the Labour Party is the highest political office within the British Labour Party. The current holder of the position is Andy Burnham since 17 July 2026, following his victory in the 2026 Labour Party leadership election.

The position of leader was officially codified in the Labour Party's constitution in 1922. Before this, from when Labour MPs were first elected at the 1906 general election and the 1922 general election (the first election that saw substantial gains for the Labour Party), the position of leader was known as Chairman of the Parliamentary Labour Party (PLP). Following the 1970 general election, the positions of party leader and PLP chair were separated.

In 1921, J. R. Clynes became the first Leader of the Labour Party to have been born in England; all leaders before him had been born in Scotland. Following the 1924 general election, Ramsay MacDonald became the first party leader to become Prime Minister of the United Kingdom, leading a minority government which lasted nine months. Following the 1945 general election, Clement Attlee became the first leader to form a majority government. In 1983, Neil Kinnock became the first party leader to have been born in Wales. The only two party leaders not to have contested general elections (excluding acting leaders) are George Lansbury, who resigned, and John Smith, who died in office. (Note: See Labour's electoral performance.)

To date, the only leaders to have led the party to victory in general elections are Ramsay MacDonald, Clement Attlee, Harold Wilson, Tony Blair and Keir Starmer. Out of the five, Wilson won four general elections out of five contested, in 1964, 1966, February 1974 (forming a minority government) and October 1974. Blair won three consecutive electoral victories in 1997, 2001 (both landslide victories), and 2005. Attlee, the first leader to lead Labour to a majority in 1945, also won in 1950. Starmer led Labour to a landslide victory in 2024, although his victory was tempered by a percentage share of the popular vote that was the lowest of any party forming a majority government in British electoral history. Both James Callaghan and Gordon Brown also served as prime minister, but did not win general elections. Three Labour leaders subsequently stood against official Labour Party candidates at general elections, George Barnes, MacDonald and Jeremy Corbyn.

When the Labour Party forms the Government of the United Kingdom, the leader is expected to serve as prime minister, First Lord of the Treasury and Minister for the Civil Service, as well as appointing and chairing the Cabinet. Concordantly, when the party is in Opposition, the leader is expected to act as the Leader of the Opposition and to chair the Shadow Cabinet.

== Selection process ==
The leader of the Labour Party, along with their deputy, is elected using an alternative vote system. Before 1980, the party leader was elected solely by members of the Parliamentary Labour Party (PLP).

From 1980 to 2014 an electoral college was used to elect the leader, with a third of votes allocated to the party's MPs and MEPs, a third to individual members of the Labour Party, and a third to individual members of all affiliated organisations, including socialist societies and trade unions.

Beginning with the 2015 leadership election, the party now uses a "one member, one vote" system, in which the votes of MPs, party members and members of affiliated organisations are all weighted equally. While the votes of Labour MPs are no longer counted separately, leadership candidates must first receive the nomination of at least 20% of MPs in order to appear on the ballot.

The PLP does not have the equivalent of the Conservative Party's 1922 Committee to call a binding vote of confidence for the party leader; Jeremy Corbyn did not resign despite 80% of Labour MPs voting against him. A potential challenger to the current leader would need the support of 20% of MPs to call an election to choose a replacement; the current leader would automatically be on the ballot unless deciding otherwise.

== Leaders of the Labour Party (1906–present) ==
Note: the right-hand column does not allocate height proportional to time in office.

A list of leaders (including acting leaders) since 1906.

No.	Leader (birth–death)	Constituency	Took office	Left office	Elections	Tenure	Prime Minister (term)
1	Keir Hardie (1856–1915)	Merthyr Tydfil	17 January 1906	22 January 1908	1906	2 years, 5 days	Campbell-Bannerman 1905–1908
2	Arthur Henderson (1863–1935)	Barnard Castle	22 January 1908	14 February 1910	Jan 1910	2 years, 24 days	Campbell-Bannerman 1905–1908
2	Arthur Henderson (1863–1935)	Barnard Castle	22 January 1908	14 February 1910	Jan 1910	2 years, 24 days	Asquith 1908–1916
3	George Barnes (1859–1940)	Glasgow Blackfriars and Hutchesontown	14 February 1910	6 February 1911	Dec 1910	358 days	Asquith 1908–1916
4	Ramsay MacDonald (1866–1937)	Leicester	6 February 1911	5 August 1914	―	3 years, 181 days	Asquith 1908–1916
(2)	Arthur Henderson (1863–1935)	Barnard Castle	5 August 1914	24 October 1917	―	3 years, 81 days	Asquith 1908–1916
(2)	Arthur Henderson (1863–1935)	Barnard Castle	5 August 1914	24 October 1917	―	3 years, 81 days	Lloyd George 1916–1922
5	William Adamson (1863–1936)	West Fife	24 October 1917	14 February 1921	1918	3 years, 113 days	Lloyd George 1916–1922
6	J. R. Clynes (1869–1949)	Manchester Platting	14 February 1921	21 November 1922	1922	1 year, 281 days	Lloyd George 1916–1922
6	J. R. Clynes (1869–1949)	Manchester Platting	14 February 1921	21 November 1922	1922	1 year, 281 days	Law 1922–1923
(4)	Ramsay MacDonald (1866–1937)	Aberavon	21 November 1922 (elected)	28 August 1931	1923; 1924; 1929	8 years, 280 days	Law 1922–1923
(4)	Ramsay MacDonald (1866–1937)	Aberavon	21 November 1922 (elected)	28 August 1931	1923; 1924; 1929	8 years, 280 days	Baldwin 1923–1924
(4)	Ramsay MacDonald (1866–1937)	Aberavon	21 November 1922 (elected)	28 August 1931	1923; 1924; 1929	8 years, 280 days	Himself 1924
(4)	Ramsay MacDonald (1866–1937)	Aberavon	21 November 1922 (elected)	28 August 1931	1923; 1924; 1929	8 years, 280 days	Baldwin 1924–1929
(4)	Ramsay MacDonald (1866–1937)	Aberavon	21 November 1922 (elected)	28 August 1931	1923; 1924; 1929	8 years, 280 days	Himself 1929–1931
(2)	Arthur Henderson (1863–1935)	Burnley (1931); None (Note: Henderson was defeated in his Burnley seat in the 1931 election, and did not return to Parliament during his third term as leader. George Lansbury acted as the Labour parliamentary leader, until formally succeeding Henderson as party leader.) (1931–1932)	28 August 1931 (unopposed)	25 October 1932	1931	1 year, 59 days	MacDonald 1931–1935
7	George Lansbury (1859–1940)	Bow and Bromley	25 October 1932 (unopposed)	8 October 1935	―	2 years, 349 days	MacDonald 1931–1935
7	George Lansbury (1859–1940)	Bow and Bromley	25 October 1932 (unopposed)	8 October 1935	―	2 years, 349 days	Baldwin 1935–1937
8	Clement Attlee (1883–1967)	Limehouse (1935–1950); Walthamstow West (1950–1955)	25 October 1935 (elected)	7 December 1955	1935; 1945; 1950; 1951; 1955	20 years, 44 days	Baldwin 1935–1937
8	Clement Attlee (1883–1967)	Limehouse (1935–1950); Walthamstow West (1950–1955)	25 October 1935 (elected)	7 December 1955	1935; 1945; 1950; 1951; 1955	20 years, 44 days	Chamberlain 1937–1940
8	Clement Attlee (1883–1967)	Limehouse (1935–1950); Walthamstow West (1950–1955)	25 October 1935 (elected)	7 December 1955	1935; 1945; 1950; 1951; 1955	20 years, 44 days	Churchill 1940–1945
8	Clement Attlee (1883–1967)	Limehouse (1935–1950); Walthamstow West (1950–1955)	25 October 1935 (elected)	7 December 1955	1935; 1945; 1950; 1951; 1955	20 years, 44 days	Himself 1945–1951
8	Clement Attlee (1883–1967)	Limehouse (1935–1950); Walthamstow West (1950–1955)	25 October 1935 (elected)	7 December 1955	1935; 1945; 1950; 1951; 1955	20 years, 44 days	Churchill 1951–1955
8	Clement Attlee (1883–1967)	Limehouse (1935–1950); Walthamstow West (1950–1955)	25 October 1935 (elected)	7 December 1955	1935; 1945; 1950; 1951; 1955	20 years, 44 days	Eden 1955–1957
―	Herbert Morrison (Note: Deputy Leaders who assumed the role of party leader temporarily because of the death or resignation of the incumbent, serving until the election of a new leader. As they were not elected or appointed in an official capacity, they are not included in the order count. Herbert Morrison acted as leader for the seven days between Clement Attlee's resignation and Hugh Gaitskell's election as leader. George Brown and Margaret Beckett acted as leader following deaths of Gaitskell and John Smith, respectively. Harriet Harman acted as leader twice when Gordon Brown and Ed Miliband resigned.) (acting) (1888–1965)	Lewisham South	7 December 1955	14 December 1955	―	7 days	Eden 1955–1957
9	Hugh Gaitskell (1906–1963)	Leeds South	14 December 1955 (elected)	18 January 1963 (died in office)	1959	7 years, 36 days	Eden 1955–1957
9	Hugh Gaitskell (1906–1963)	Leeds South	14 December 1955 (elected)	18 January 1963 (died in office)	1959	7 years, 36 days	Macmillan 1957–1963
―	George Brown (acting) (1914–1985)	Belper	18 January 1963	14 February 1963	―	28 days	Macmillan 1957–1963
10	Harold Wilson (1916–1995)	Huyton	14 February 1963 (elected)	5 April 1976	1964; 1966; 1970; Feb 1974; Oct 1974	13 years, 50 days	Macmillan 1957–1963
10	Harold Wilson (1916–1995)	Huyton	14 February 1963 (elected)	5 April 1976	1964; 1966; 1970; Feb 1974; Oct 1974	13 years, 50 days	Douglas-Home 1963–1964
10	Harold Wilson (1916–1995)	Huyton	14 February 1963 (elected)	5 April 1976	1964; 1966; 1970; Feb 1974; Oct 1974	13 years, 50 days	Himself 1964–1970
10	Harold Wilson (1916–1995)	Huyton	14 February 1963 (elected)	5 April 1976	1964; 1966; 1970; Feb 1974; Oct 1974	13 years, 50 days	Heath 1970–1974
10	Harold Wilson (1916–1995)	Huyton	14 February 1963 (elected)	5 April 1976	1964; 1966; 1970; Feb 1974; Oct 1974	13 years, 50 days	Himself 1974–1976
11	James Callaghan (1912–2005)	Cardiff South East	5 April 1976 (elected)	10 November 1980	1979	4 years, 221 days	Himself 1976–1979
11	James Callaghan (1912–2005)	Cardiff South East	5 April 1976 (elected)	10 November 1980	1979	4 years, 221 days	Thatcher 1979–1990
12	Michael Foot (1913–2010)	Ebbw Vale	10 November 1980 (elected)	2 October 1983	1983	2 years, 327 days	Thatcher 1979–1990
13	Neil Kinnock (b. 1942)	Islwyn	2 October 1983 (elected)	18 July 1992	1987; 1992	8 years, 291 days	Thatcher 1979–1990
13	Neil Kinnock (b. 1942)	Islwyn	2 October 1983 (elected)	18 July 1992	1987; 1992	8 years, 291 days	Major 1990–1997
14	John Smith (1938–1994)	Monklands East	18 July 1992 (elected)	12 May 1994 (died in office)	―	1 year, 299 days	Major 1990–1997
―	Margaret Beckett (acting) (b. 1943)	Derby South	12 May 1994	21 July 1994	―	71 days	Major 1990–1997
15	Tony Blair (b. 1953)	Sedgefield	21 July 1994 (elected)	24 June 2007	1997; 2001; 2005	12 years, 341 days	Major 1990–1997
15	Tony Blair (b. 1953)	Sedgefield	21 July 1994 (elected)	24 June 2007	1997; 2001; 2005	12 years, 341 days	Himself 1997–2007
16	Gordon Brown (b. 1951)	Kirkcaldy and Cowdenbeath	24 June 2007 (unopposed)	11 May 2010	2010	2 years, 319 days	Himself 2007–2010
―	Harriet Harman (acting) (b. 1950)	Camberwell and Peckham	11 May 2010	25 September 2010	―	138 days	Cameron 2010–2016
17	Ed Miliband (b. 1969)	Doncaster North	25 September 2010 (elected)	8 May 2015	2015	4 years, 226 days	Cameron 2010–2016
―	Harriet Harman (acting) (b. 1950)	Camberwell and Peckham	8 May 2015	12 September 2015	―	128 days	Cameron 2010–2016
18	Jeremy Corbyn (b. 1949)	Islington North	12 September 2015 (elected)	4 April 2020	2017; 2019	4 years, 206 days	Cameron 2010–2016
18	Jeremy Corbyn (b. 1949)	Islington North	12 September 2015 (elected)	4 April 2020	2017; 2019	4 years, 206 days	May 2016–2019
18	Jeremy Corbyn (b. 1949)	Islington North	12 September 2015 (elected)	4 April 2020	2017; 2019	4 years, 206 days	Johnson 2019–2022
19	Keir Starmer (b. 1962)	Holborn and St Pancras	4 April 2020 (elected)	17 July 2026	2024	6 years, 104 days	Johnson 2019–2022
19	Keir Starmer (b. 1962)	Holborn and St Pancras	4 April 2020 (elected)	17 July 2026	2024	6 years, 104 days	Truss Sep–Oct 2022
19	Keir Starmer (b. 1962)	Holborn and St Pancras	4 April 2020 (elected)	17 July 2026	2024	6 years, 104 days	Sunak 2022–2024
19	Keir Starmer (b. 1962)	Holborn and St Pancras	4 April 2020 (elected)	17 July 2026	2024	6 years, 104 days	Himself 2024–2026
20	Andy Burnham (b. 1970)	Makerfield	17 July 2026 (unopposed)	Incumbent	―	65 days	Himself 2026–present

== Leaders by time in office ==
This list ranks leaders of the Labour Party (not including acting leaders) by their time in office. Leaders that also served as Prime Minister are in bold.

Rank	No.	Leader	Time in office
1	8th	**Clement Attlee**	20 years, 44 days
2	10th	**Harold Wilson**	13 years, 50 days
3	15th	**Tony Blair**	12 years, 341 days
4	4th	**Ramsay MacDonald**	12 years, 96 days
5	13th	Neil Kinnock	8 years, 291 days
6	9th	Hugh Gaitskell	7 years, 36 days
7	2nd	Arthur Henderson	6 years, 164 days
8	19th	**Keir Starmer**	6 years, 104 days
9	17th	Ed Miliband	4 years, 226 days
10	11th	**James Callaghan**	4 years, 221 days
11	18th	Jeremy Corbyn	4 years, 206 days
12	5th	William Adamson	3 years, 113 days
13	7th	George Lansbury	2 years, 349 days
14	12th	Michael Foot	2 years, 327 days
15	16th	**Gordon Brown**	2 years, 319 days
16	1st	Keir Hardie	2 years, 5 days
17	14th	John Smith	1 year, 299 days
18	6th	J. R. Clynes	1 year, 281 days
19	3rd	George Barnes	358 days
20	20th	**Andy Burnham**	65 days (Note: As of 20 September 2026)

== Retirement ==
It is not uncommon for a retired leader of the Labour Party to be granted a peerage upon their retirement, particularly if they served as prime minister; examples of this include Clement Attlee, Harold Wilson and James Callaghan. However, Neil Kinnock was also elevated to the House of Lords, despite never being prime minister, and Michael Foot declined a similar offer.

== See also ==
- History of the Labour Party (UK)
- Leader of the Conservative Party (UK)
- Leader of the Liberal Democrats
