= 1922 Labour Party leadership election =

Labour Party leadership elections were held in the following countries in 1922:

- 1922 Labour Party leadership election (UK)
- 1922 New Zealand Labour Party leadership election, see New Zealand Liberal Party
