= 1931 United Kingdom general election in Scotland =

- 27 October 1931

All 74 Scottish seats to the House of Commons
- Turnout: 77.4% (▲4.2 pp)
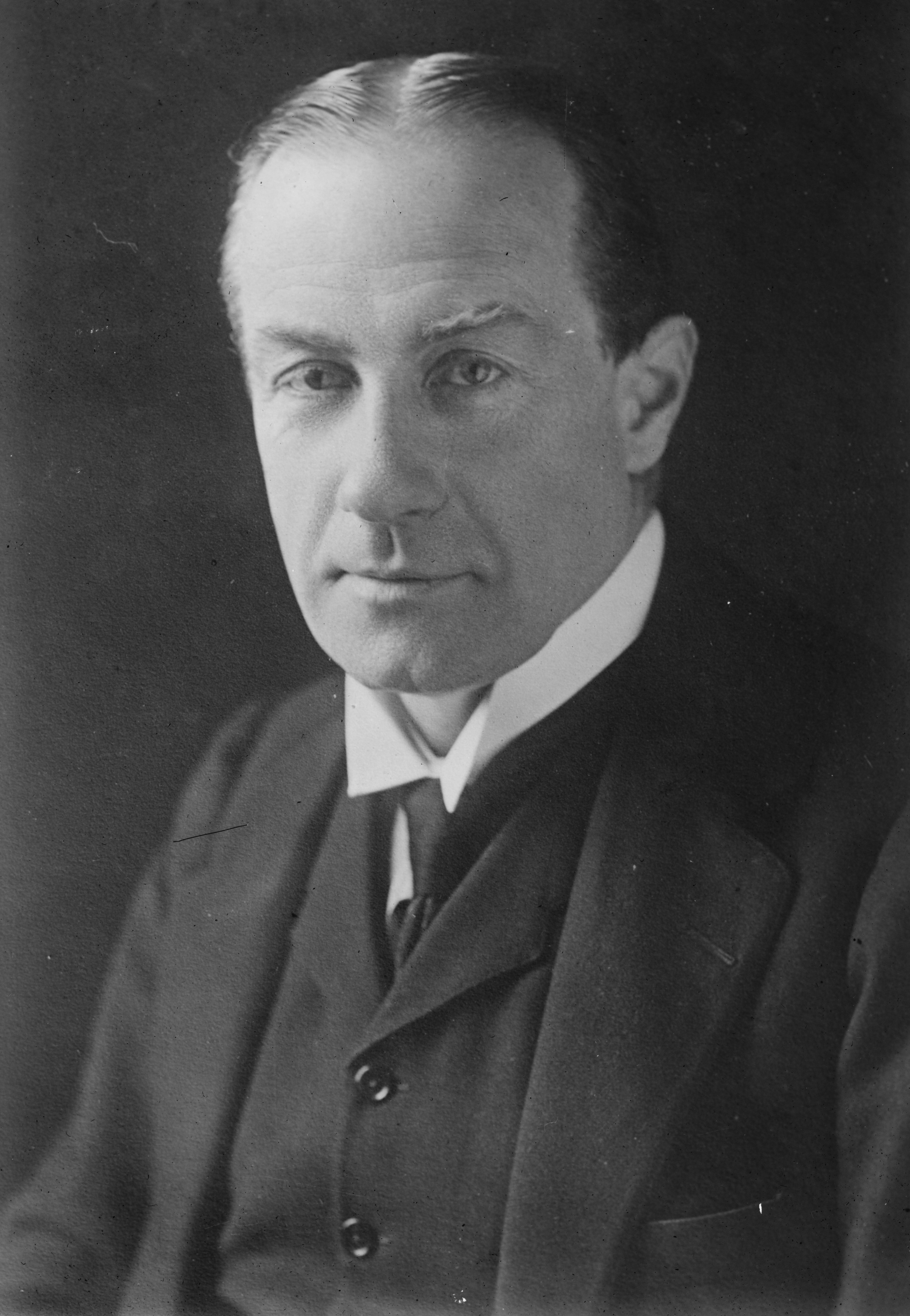

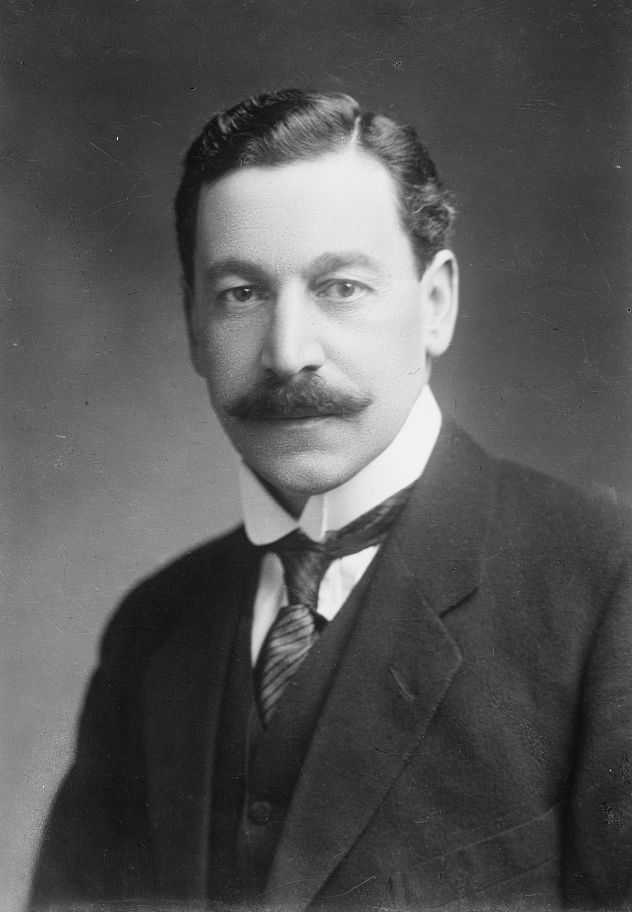

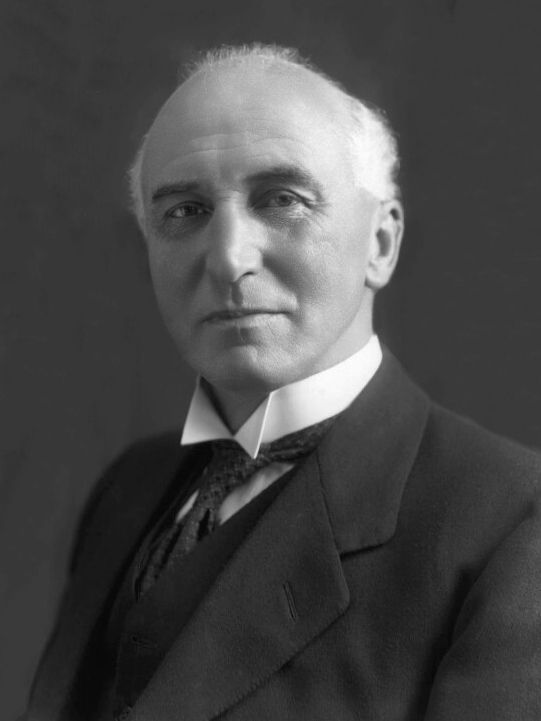

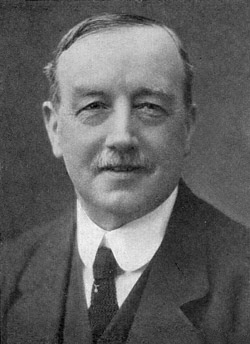

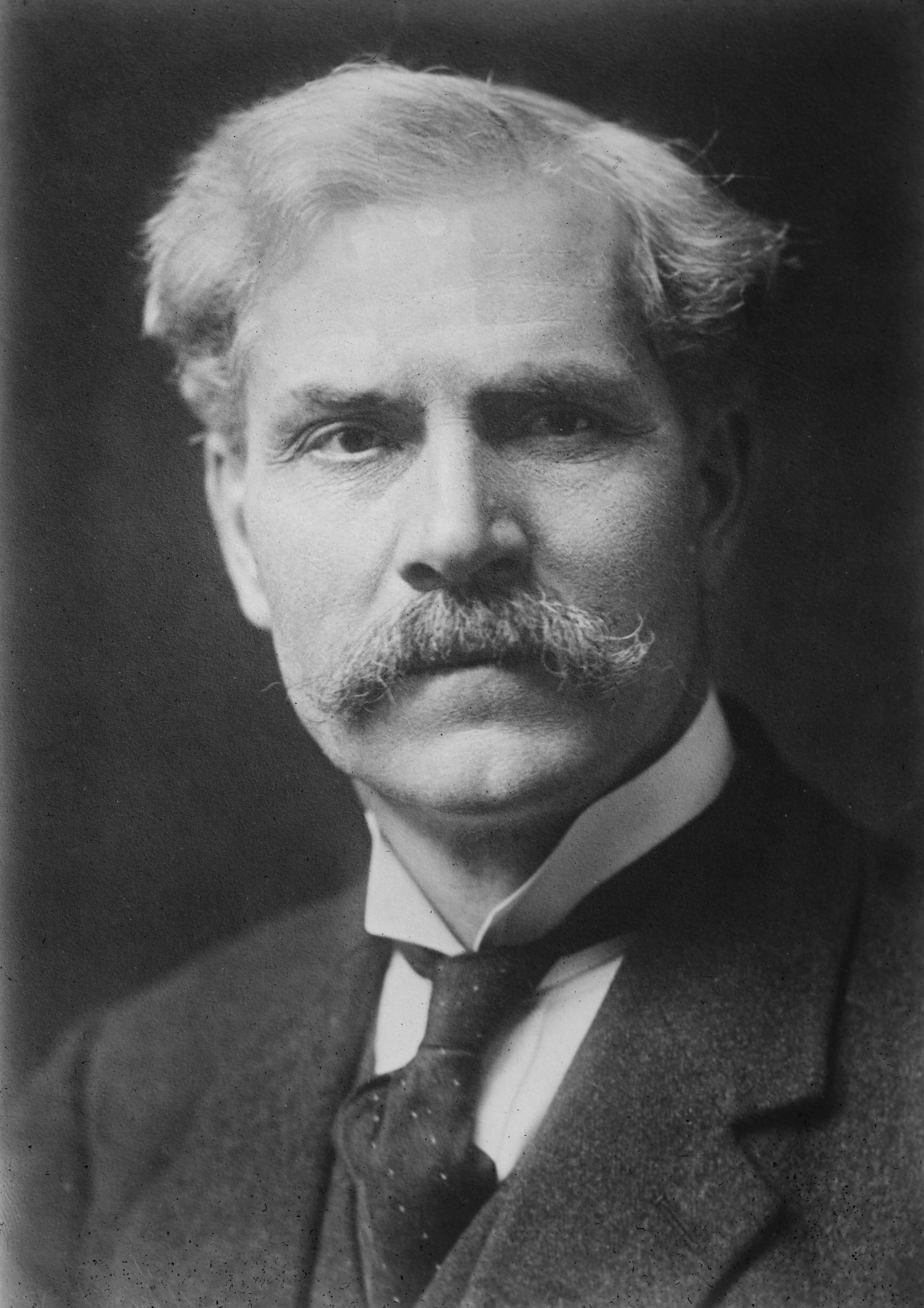
	First party	Second party	Third party
Leader	Stanley Baldwin	Herbert Samuel	John Simon
Party	Unionist	Liberal	National Liberal
Alliance	Conservative & National Government	Liberal & National Government	National Government
Leader since	23 May 1923	October 1931	5 October 1931
Leader's seat	Bewdley	Darwen	Spen Valley
Last election	22 seats, (Note: Combined results for burgh, county and university seats) 35.9%	14 seats, 18.1%	Did not contest
Seats won	50	8	8
Seat change	▲28	▼6	▲8
Popular vote	1,056,768 (Note: Total and percentage votes given here are for territorial constituencies only)	205,384	101,430
Percentage	49.5%	8.6%	4.9%
Swing	▲13.6 pp	▼9.5 pp	New party
	Fourth party	Fifth party
Leader	Arthur Henderson	Ramsay MacDonald
Party	Labour	National Labour
Alliance		National Government
Leader since	1 September 1931	24 August 1931
Leader's seat	Burnley (Lost seat)	Seaham
Last election	36 seats, 42.3%	Did not contest
Seats won	7 (Note: Figure is for all Scottish candidates in the Labour Opposition in 1931)	1
Seat change	▼29	▲1
Popular vote	696,248	21,803
Percentage	32.6%	1.0%
Swing	▼9.7 pp	New party

On Tuesday 27 October 1931, the 1931 United Kingdom general election was held in Scotland, to elect all 615 members of the House of Commons, with 74 seats being in Scotland. 71 seats (32 burgh constituencies and 38 county constituencies) (Note: One burgh seat, Dundee, was represented by two members of parliament.) represented territorial constituencies. There was also one university constituency, which elected an additional 3 members using the Single Transferable Vote (STV) method.

The election saw massive gains for the Unionists across the country, with the party winning nearly 70 per cent of all Scottish seats. The parties forming the National Government together won 63.7 per cent of the vote, and 90.5 per cent of the seats in Scotland. In contrast the Labour Party, which had been the largest party in Scotland following the 1929 general election (where it had won 41.8 per cent of the Scottish vote), was relegated into fourth place within just two years. Across the United Kingdom, the National Government coalition won 67 per cent of the popular vote and over 90 per cent of the seats in the House of Commons.

== Candidates ==
Below is a table summarising the candidates of the 1931 general election in Scotland, excluding those in the Combined Scottish Universities constituency.

Affiliation	Candidates
Unionist Party	56
Labour Party	45 (Note: Includes three Co-operative Party candidates, as part of the Labour-Co-op alliance.)
Scottish Liberal Party	14
Independent Labour Party	9
Liberal National Party	8
Communist Party of Great Britain	8
National Party of Scotland	5 (Note: The candidates that stood were Oliver Brown in East Renfrewshire, Thomas Thomson Alexander in Edinburgh East, Elma Campbell in Glasgow St Rollox, John MacCormick in Inverness and Roland Muirhead in West Renfrewshire.)
New Party	5 (Note: The candidates that stood were William Weir Gilmour in Coatbridge, Cecil Dudgeon in Galloway, J. Mellick in Glasgow Cathcart, W. E. Stevenson in Glasgow Shettleston and Robert Forgan in West Renfrewshire.)
Constituency Labour Party	3 (Note: This category of candidates were those who were chosen in seats to represent Labour, however, were sponsored by the Constituency Labour Party in seats in which the Labour Party chose not to stand, and were not official candidates at this election. The candidates that stood were David Kirkwood in Dumbarton Burghs, George Buchanan in Glasgow Gorbals and Charles Aloysius O'Donnell in Glasgow Hillhead.)
Scottish Prohibition Party	1 (Note: Leader Edwin Scrymgeour stood in Dundee.)
National Labour Organisation	1 (Note: Incumbent sitting Labour Member of Parliament Craigie Aitchison, who defected to National Labour, stood in Kilmarnock.)
Total	155

== Analysis ==
=== National Government ===
The Parties that made up the National Government won a total of 67 seats at this election in Scotland, including a total of 31 gained seats primarily from the Labour Party. However, the newly formed Liberal National Party also internally won seats by defects from the Scottish Liberal Party, which was within a national affiliation with the Liberal Party in the National Government.

The Liberal National Party won Dunfermline Burghs from the Labour Party; however, within the National Government coalition, it won Inverness, Ross and Cromarty, Western Isles, Montrose Burghs, Fife East, Greenock and Leith from the Liberal Party. Furthermore, the Unionist Party, within a national affiliation with the Conservative Party within the National Coalition, won Aberdeenshire West and Kincardine and Galloway from the Scottish Liberals. Contrary to the losses, The Liberal Party won Paisley, Edinburgh East as well as one of the two seats in Dundee from Labour. The Liberal Party also retained its seat in the Combined Scottish Universities constituency. The Liberal National Party therefore won a total of eight seats at the election (which were all candidates that stood for the party in Scotland), with the Scottish Liberals also holding eight.

The Unionist Party made further gains from Labour. These were Aberdeen North, Stirling and Falkirk, Clackmannan and Eastern Stirlingshire, Stirlingshire West, Fife West, Kirkcaldy Burghs, Dunbartonshire, Lanark, Partick, North Lanarkshire, Renfrewshire West, Maryhill, Motherwell, Camlachie, Bothwell, Coatbridge, Springburn, Rutherglen, Tradeston, South Ayrshire, Edinburgh West, Edinburgh Central, Midlothian South and Peebles, Linlithgow and Berwick and Haddington. It also took the other of two seats in Dundee from the Scottish Prohibition Party. The Unionists also retained their two seats in the Combined Scottish Universities Constituency.

The newly formed National Labour under Prime Minister Ramsay MacDonald also took one seat in Scotland. This was Kilmarnock wherein the sitting MP, Craigie Aitchison, defected from the Labour Party and won the seat for National Labour in this election.

=== Labour Opposition ===
Following the election, the Labour Party appeared to teeter on the edge of the electoral abyss in Scotland. The Labour Party itself in Scotland managed to win three seats under its officially endorsed candidates. Two candidates, David Kirkwood in Dumbarton Burghs and George Buchanan in Glasgow Gorbals, re-contested and won their seats; however, both were members of the Independent Labour Party and endorsed by the Constituency Labour Party at this election, rather than being the official candidates of the Labour Party. A further two candidates, James Maxton in Glasgow Bridgeton and John McGovern in Glasgow Shettleston re-contested and won their seats, but as members and representing the Independent Labour Party. John McGovern also won his electoral race against an official Labour candidate.

Each of these four represented losses for the official Labour Party, but stood as party of the Labour Opposition after election. However, the Independent Labour Party increasingly moved apart from Labour, and ultimately dissociating from the party in March 1932. The ILP had dominated the Labour movement in Scotland since 1918, dominating community based activism, and essentially forming the Labour Party in Scotland. This had ultimately served to undermine the organisational growth of the Labour Party in Scotland.

The Labour Party, however, gained Glasgow Govan. Neil Maclean who had won the seat under the label of Independent Labour re-contested and won the seat again, this time winning as the official Labour candidate. This was one of only two gains for the Labour Party across the United Kingdom in 1931. The combined losses from the parties within the National Government and the losses from internal independent Labour candidates, Labour was reduced to holding just three seats in its own right, but carried within the Labour Opposition a slightly larger seven.

== Seat summary ==
Below is a table summarising the total number of seats, gains and losses for each party in both the territorial county and burgh constituencies and the Combined Scottish Universities constituency.

Party	Seats				
Party	Total	Gains	Losses	Net	Of total (%)
National Government (Total)	67	New		▲31	90.5
Unionist	50	28	0	▲28	67.6
Liberal National	8	New		▲8	10.8
Liberal	8	3	9	▼6	10.8
National Labour	1	New		▲1	1.4
Labour Opposition (Total)	7	1	30	▼29	9.5
Labour	3	1	34	▼33	4.1
Ind. Labour Party	2	Did not stand in 1929		▲2	2.7
Constituency Labour	2	New		▲2	2.7
Scottish Prohibition	0	0	1	▼1	—
Other	0	0	1	▼1	—
Total	74				

== County and burgh constituency results ==
Below is a table summarising the constituency results of the 1931 general election in Scotland, excluding the result in the Combined Scottish Universities constituency.

Party	Seats					Aggregate votes		
Party	Total	Gains	Losses	Net	Of total (%)	Total	Of total (%) (Note: Adjusted for multi-member constituencies.)	Change (%)
National Government (Total)	64	New		▲31	90.1	1,385,385	64.0	New
Unionist	48	28	0	▲28	67.6	1,056,768	49.5	▲13.6
Liberal	7	3	9	▼6	9.9	205,384	8.6	▼9.5
Liberal National	8	New		▲8	11.3	101,430	4.9	New
National Labour	1	New		▲1	1.4	21,803	1.0	New
Labour Opposition (Total)	7	1	30	▼29	9.9	696,248	32.6	▼9.7
Labour	3	1 (Note: Neil Maclean in Glasgow Govan re-contested and won the seat, but was the official Labour candidate in this election.)	34	▼33	4.2	525,765	24.7	▼17.6
Ind. Labour Party	2	Did not stand in 1929		▲2	2.8	127,331	5.9	—N/a
Constituency Labour	2	New		▲2	2.8	43,152	2.0	New
Communist	0	0	0	Steady	—	35,618	1.4	▲0.3
Scottish Prohibition	0	0	1 (Note: Edwin Scrymgeour in Dundee.)	▼1	—	32,229	0.7	▼0.4
NPS	0	0	0	Steady	—	20,954	1.0	▲0.8
New Party	0	New			—	3,895	0.2	New
Other	0	0	1	▼1	—	0	0.0	—N/a
Total	71			0	100.0	2,174,329	100.0	0.0
Registered voters, and turnout						2,700,993 (Note: Electorate in contested constituencies. The total electorate was 2,992,433.)	77.4	▲4.2

=== Popular vote ===
Popular vote
Unionist	49.5%
Labour Opp.	32.6%
Liberal	8.6%
National Liberal	4.9%
Communist	1.4%
National Labour	1.0%
NPS	1.0%
Other	1.0%

Popular vote (coalitions)
National Gov.	64.0%
Labour Opp.	32.6%
Communist	1.4%
NPS	1.0%
Other	1.0%

=== Parliament seats ===
Parliamentary seats
Unionist	67.6%
National Liberal	10.8%
Liberal	10.8%
Labour Opp.	9.5%
National Labour	1.4%

Parliament seats (coalitions)
National Gov.	90.5%
Labour Opp.	9.5%

== Combined Scottish Universities result ==
General election, November 1931: Combined Scottish Universities
Party	Candidate	Votes	%	±%
Unionist	John Buchan	Unopposed		
Liberal	Dugald McCoig Cowan	Unopposed		
Unionist	Archibald Noel Skelton	Unopposed		

== See also ==
- 1931 United Kingdom general election in England
- 1931 United Kingdom general election in Wales
- 1931 United Kingdom general election in Northern Ireland
