= 1931 United Kingdom general election =

- 27 October 1931

All 615 seats in the House of Commons 308 seats needed for a majority
- Registered: 29,952,361
- Turnout: 21,656,373; 76.4% (▲0.1 pp)
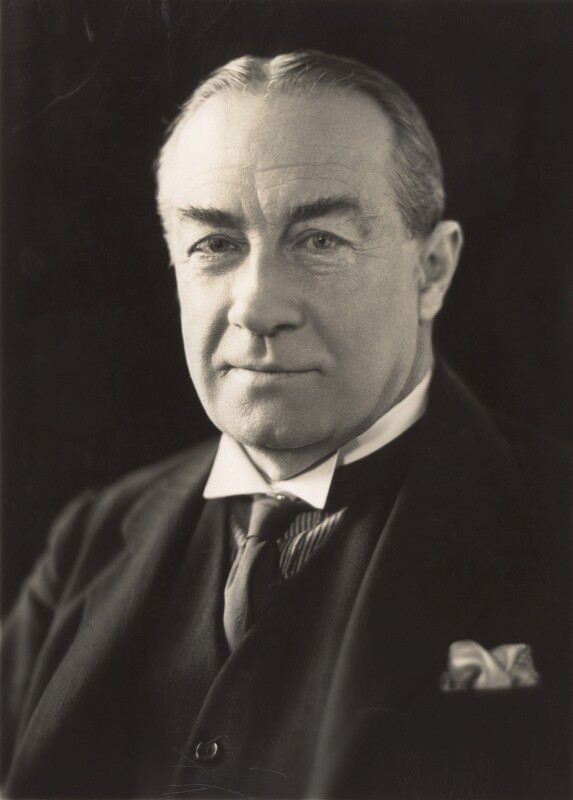

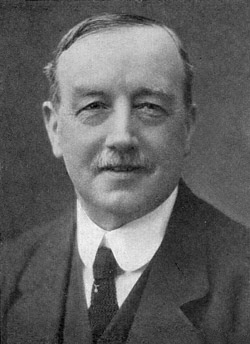

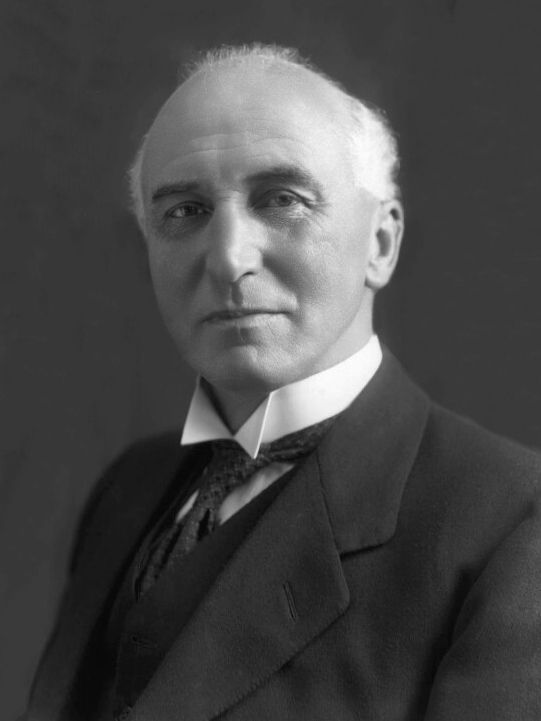

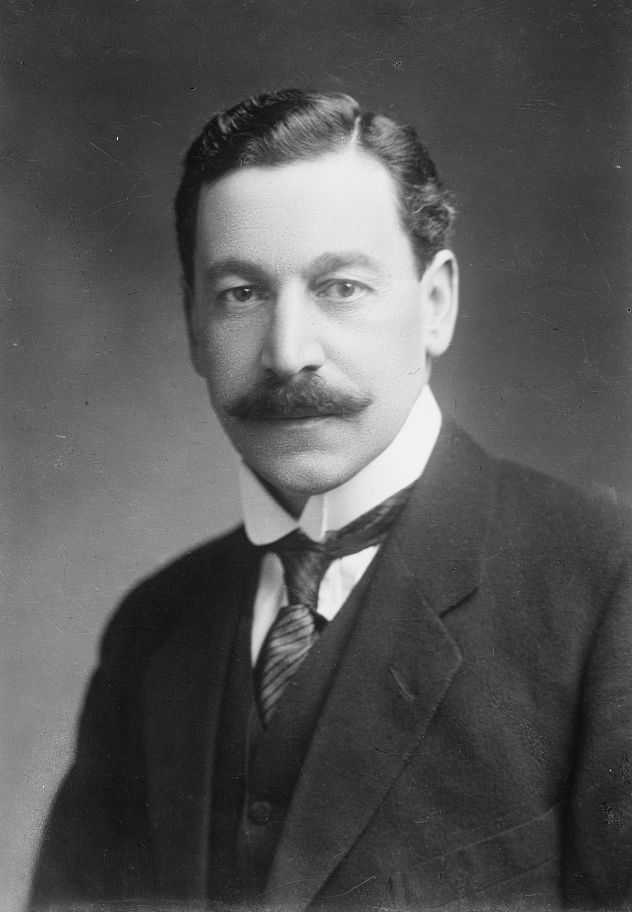

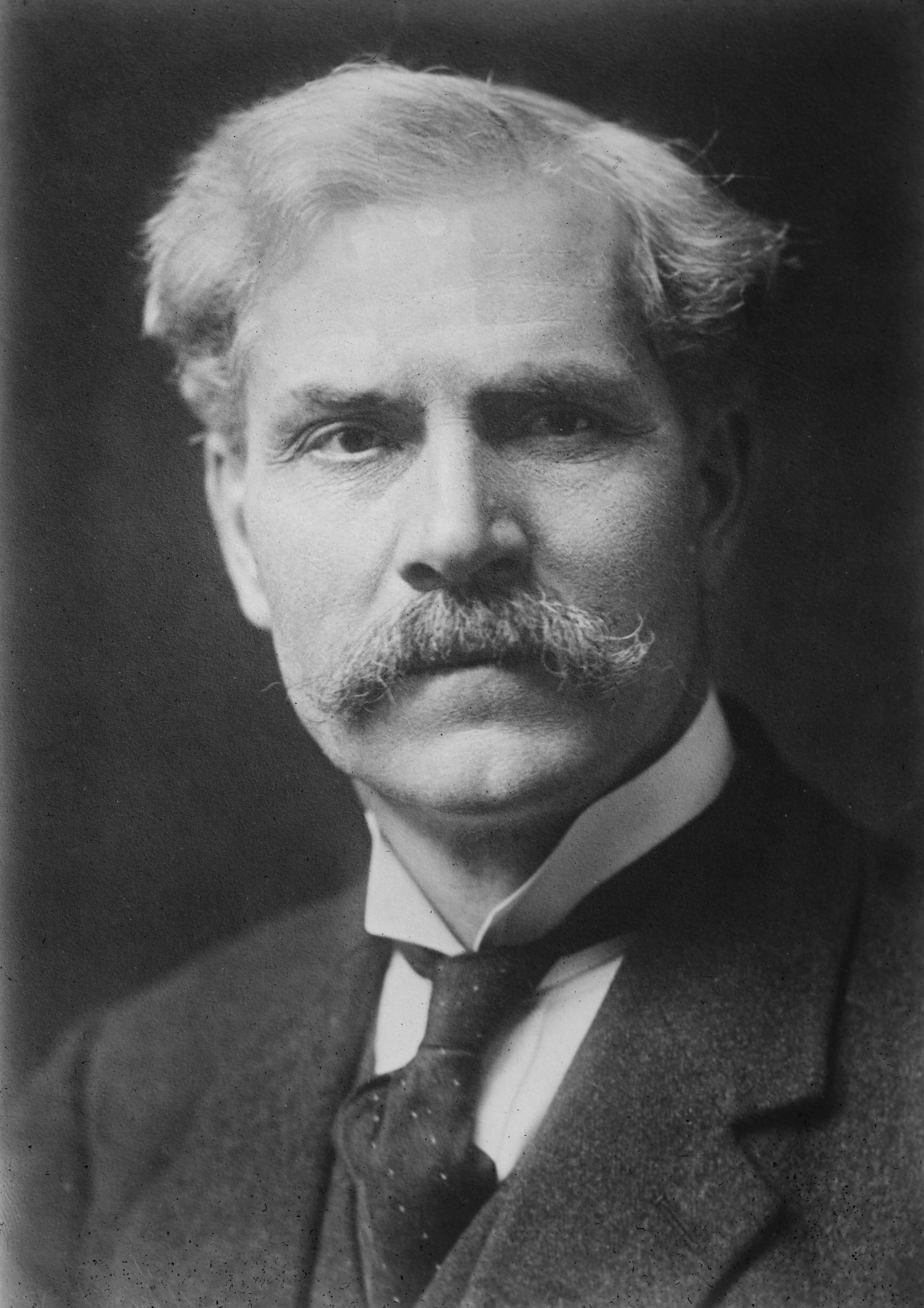

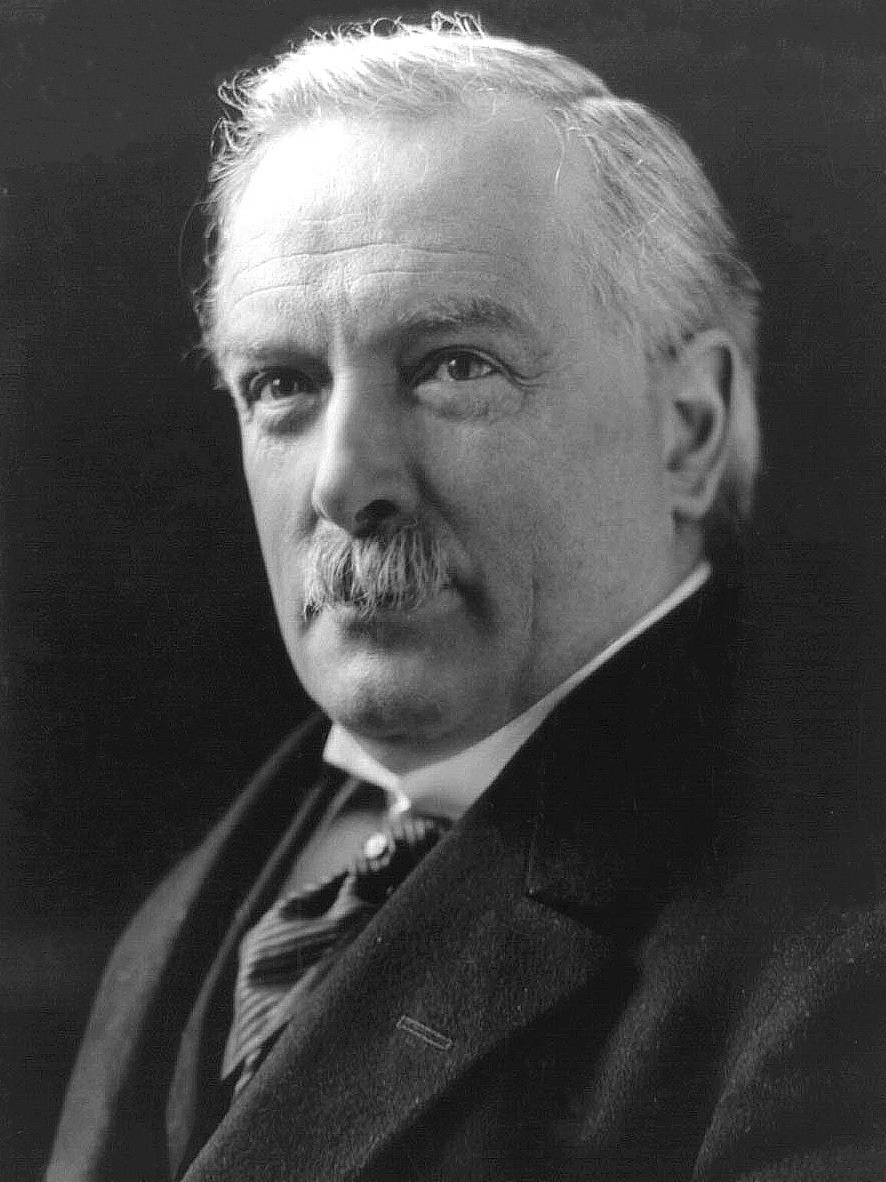
	First party	Second party	Third party
Leader	Stanley Baldwin	Arthur Henderson	John Simon
Party	Conservative	Labour	Liberal National
Alliance	National Government		National Government
Leader since	23 May 1923	1 September 1931	5 October 1931
Leader's seat	Bewdley	Burnley (lost seat)	Spen Valley
Last election	260 seats, 38.1%	287 seats, 37.1%	Did not contest
Seats won	470 (Note: Figure includes Speaker of the House of Commons Edward FitzRoy in Daventry.)	52	35
Seat change	▲210	▼235	▲35
Popular vote	11,905,925	6,649,630	809,302
Percentage	55.0%	30.9%	3.7%
Swing	▲16.9 pp	▼6.2 pp	New party
	Fourth party	Fifth party	Sixth party
Leader	Herbert Samuel	Ramsay MacDonald	David Lloyd George
Party	Liberal	National Labour	Independent Liberals
Alliance	National Government	National Government
Leader since	October 1931	24 August 1931	1931
Leader's seat	Darwen	Seaham	Caernarvon Boroughs
Last election	59 seats, 23.5%	Did not contest	Did not contest
Seats won	32	13	4
Seat change	▼27	▲13	▲4
Popular vote	1,372,595	341,370	103,528
Percentage	6.5%	1.5%	0.5%
Swing	▼17.0 pp	New party	New party
- Colours denote the winning party—as shown in § Results

- Composition of the House of Commons after election
Prime Minister before election
Ramsay MacDonald
Labour
Prime Minister after election
Ramsay MacDonald
National

A general election was held in the United Kingdom on Tuesday, 27 October 1931. It saw a landslide election victory for the National Government, a three-party coalition which had been formed two months previously after the collapse of the second Labour government. Journalist Ivor Bulmer-Thomas described the result as "the most astonishing in the history of the British party system".

Unable to secure support from his cabinet for his preferred policy responses to the economic and social crises brought about by the Great Depression, Prime Minister Ramsay MacDonald split from the Labour Party and formed a new national government in coalition with the Conservative Party and a number of Liberals. MacDonald subsequently campaigned for a "Doctor's Mandate" to do whatever was necessary to fix the economy, running as the leader of a new party called National Labour within the coalition. Disagreement over whether to join the new government also resulted in the Liberal Party splitting into three separate factions, including one led by former Prime Minister David Lloyd George.

Collectively, the parties forming the National Government won 67% of the popular vote and 554 (90.1%) of 615 seats in the House of Commons. Although the bulk of the National Government's support came from the Conservative Party, which won a majority in its own right with 470 seats, MacDonald remained Prime Minister. The Labour Party suffered its greatest ever defeat—losing four-fifths of its seats, including the seat of leader Arthur Henderson—and became the official opposition with just 52 MPs. The collapse of the Liberals into competing factions also ended their time as a significant force in British politics; the breakaway National Liberals were eventually absorbed into the Conservatives in 1947, while the main Liberal Party would remain in the political wilderness until its revival in the 1970s.

It is the most recent election in which any single party (the Conservatives) received an absolute majority of the votes cast, and the last UK general election not to take place on a Thursday. It was also the last election until 1997 in which any single party won more than 400 seats.

== Background ==
After battling with the Great Depression for two years, the Labour government of Ramsay MacDonald was faced with a budget crisis in August 1931. The cabinet deadlocked over its response, with several influential members—such as Arthur Henderson—unwilling to support budget cuts (in particular a cut in the rate of unemployment benefit) which were pressed by the civil service and opposition parties. Crucially, Chancellor of the Exchequer Philip Snowden refused to consider deficit spending or tariffs as alternative solutions, and without any other options to address the crisis the government was forced to resign. However, MacDonald was encouraged by King George V to form an all-party National Government in coalition with the Conservatives and Liberals in order to break the deadlock.

The initial hope was that the coalition government would hold office for only a few weeks in order to address the country's immediate economic crises, then dissolve for a return to ordinary party politics—but when the government was forced to remove the pound sterling from the gold standard it became clear that it would require more time in office. Meanwhile, the Labour Party expelled all those who were supporting the government, and MacDonald's decision to lead a Conservative-dominated coalition instead of the party he had co-founded was labelled a "betrayal" by his erstwhile colleagues and supporters.

The Conservatives began pressing their partners to fight an election together as a combined unit in order to secure a mandate for radical economic reform, and MacDonald's supporters from the Labour Party formed the National Labour Organisation to support him. While initially against an early election, MacDonald came to endorse the idea in order to take advantage of Labour's unpopularity due to its poor economic record in office.

However, the Liberals were sceptical about an election and had to be persuaded. The key issue was the Conservatives' wish to introduce protectionist trade policies: the majority of the Liberals, led by Sir Herbert Samuel, were opposed, considering support for free trade to be a non-negotiable component of the Liberal political tradition. The argument split the party in half: Samuel withdrew the Liberals from the National Government (though continued to lend it their confidence, and still stood in the election as part of the coalition), while the National Liberals—under the leadership of Sir John Simon—remained, willing to support protectionism.

While this was happening, former prime minister David Lloyd George was still technically the Liberal Party's leader—however, due to having undergone an operation in early 1931, with a long recuperation, he was unable to take up a ministerial role when the National Government was formed. While initially supportive of both the coalition and its protectionist trade policy, he strongly opposed the proposal for an election. He and a third faction of Liberal MPs—the Independent Liberals—also broke away, and ran in the election on an anti-National Government platform.

Parliament was dissolved on 7 October. In order to appease the various factions within the coalition its manifesto avoided proposing any specific policy, and instead asked voters for a "Doctor's Mandate" to do whatever was necessary to rescue the economy. Individual candidates were then allowed to state their support for policies such as trade tariffs.

Labour campaigned on opposition to public spending cuts, but this was a difficult position to justify when many of the cuts had initially been agreed when Labour was in government. By 1931, Labour had lost significant economic credibility due to soaring unemployment—especially in coal, textiles, shipbuilding and steel—and the party's working class base increasingly lost confidence in its ability to solve the most pressing problems facing the country.

An additional problem for Labour came from the 2.5 million Irish Catholics in England and Scotland, who had traditionally been a major component of their working class base. By 1930 a number of Catholic bishops had grown increasingly alarmed at the party's stances on Communist Russia, birth control, and especially regarding funding Catholic schools, and the Church began to warn its members against voting Labour. This shift played a major role in Labour's collapse in support in some urban areas.

== Outcome ==
The election was a landslide for the National Government coalition, which won 67.2% of the popular vote and 518 seats out of 615 in the House of Commons—for both, it stands as the largest share ever secured in a British general election since the passage of the Reform Act 1832. (The next-best results for both was secured by the Whigs in 1832, who won 67.01% of the vote and 67.02% of seats under a substantially different electoral system with a much smaller electorate.) However, by far the largest share of the government's seats was won by the Conservatives, and the party's 470 seats also remains the record for the largest share of the total seats in Parliament (76.4%) won by any single party.

The victory gave the National Government a clear mandate to enact its policy platform, which the coalition believed would pull the economy out of the doldrums of the Great Depression. MacDonald remained Prime Minister, but the Conservatives were the dominant party within the coalition—National Labour contested only 20 seats, winning 13—and with his increasingly poor health over the course of the parliament he came to be more of a figurehead for the government rather than an active leader.

Labour's loss of vote share (a drop of 6.5%) was average by historical standards, but the inefficiency of its vote distribution under first-past-the-post meant that the party suffered a net loss of 235 out of 287 seats. This remains Labour's most significant absolute and per capita election loss, and it stood as the record for greatest number of seats lost by any party in a single general election until the Conservatives lost a net of 251 seats under Rishi Sunak in 2024.

== Results ==
=== Summary of seats returned ===
Party	Leader	MPs		Aggregate votes	
Party	Leader		Of total		Of total (Note: Adjusted for multi-member constituencies.)
Conservative and Unionist Party	Stanley Baldwin	470	76.4%	11,905,925	55.0%
Conservative Party (Note: Results for England and Wales.)	Stanley Baldwin	409	66.5%	10,699,591	49.6%
Unionist Party	John Craik-Henderson	50	8.1%	1,056,768	4.9%
Ulster Unionist Party	James Craig	11	1.8%	149,566	0.5%
Labour Party	Arthur Henderson	52	8.5%	6,649,630	30.9%
Labour Party	Arthur Henderson	46 (Note: Includes 1 Co-operative Party MP, as part of the Labour-Co-op alliance.)	7.5%	6,324,737	29.4%
Independent Labour Party	Fenner Brockway	3	0.5%	260,344	1.2%
Constituency Labour Party	—N/a	3	0.5%	64,549	0.3%
Liberal National Party	John Simon	35	5.7%	809,302	3.7%
Liberal Party	Herbert Samuel	32	5.2%	1,372,595	6.5%
National Labour Organisation	Ramsay MacDonald	13	2.1%	341,370	1.5%
Independent Liberals	David Lloyd George	4	0.7%	103,528	0.5%
National	—N/a	4	0.7%	100,193	0.5%
Nationalist Party	Joseph Devlin	2	0.3%	123,053	0.3%
National Independent	—N/a	2	0.3%	33,468	0.2%
Independent	—N/a	1	0.2%	8,431	0.0%

=== Full results ===

Results of the October 1931 general election to the House of Commons of the United Kingdom
Party	Leader	Candidates	MPs					Aggregate votes		
Party	Leader	Candidates	Total	Gains	Losses	Net	Of total (%)	Total	Of total (%) (Note: Adjusted for multi-member constituencies.)	Change (%)
National Government (Total)	Ramsay MacDonald	694	554	New		▲235	90.1	14,529,385	67.2	New
Conservative (Note: Figure includes the Unionist Party and the Ulster Unionist Party under their nation affiliations with the Conservative Party.)	Stanley Baldwin	518	470	210	0	▲210	76.4	11,905,925	55.0	▲16.9
Liberal	Herbert Samuel	111	32	16	43	▼27	5.2	1,372,595	6.5	▼17.0
Liberal National	John; Simon	41	35	New		▲35	5.7	809,302	3.7	New
National Labour	Ramsay MacDonald	20	13	New		▲13	2.1	341,370	1.5	New
National	—N/a	4	4 (Note: Gordon Campbell in Burnley, William Allen in Burslem, Ian Horobin in Southwark Central and William Craven-Ellis in Southampton.)	New		▲4	0.2	100,193	0.5	New
Labour Opposition (Total)	Arthur Henderson	516	52	8	243	▼235	8.5	6,649,630	30.9	▼6.2
Labour Party	Arthur Henderson	491 (Note: Includes 18 Co-operative Party candidates, as part of the Labour-Co-op alliance.)	46 (Note: Includes 1 Co-operative Party MP, as part of the Labour-Co-op alliance.)	2	243 (Note: Includes 9 Co-operative Party MP, as part of the Labour-Co-op alliance.)	▼241 (Note: Includes ▼8 Co-operative Party MP, as part of the Labour-Co-op alliance.)	7.5 (Note: Includes 0.2% for the Co-operative Party, as part of the Labour-Co-op alliance.)	6,324,737 (Note: Includes 246,198 for the Co-operative Party, as part of the Labour-Co-op alliance.)	29.4 (Note: Includes 1.2% for the Co-operative Party, as part of the Labour-Co-op alliance.)	▼7.7 (Note: Includes ▲0.2% for the Co-operative Party, as part of the Labour-Co-op alliance.)
Ind. Labour Party	Fenner Brockway	19	3	Did not stand in 1929		▲3	0.5	260,344	1.2	—N/a
Unendorsed Constituency Labour	—N/a	6	3	New		▲3	0.5	64,549	0.3	New
Nationalist	Joseph Devlin	3	2	0	0	Steady	0.3	123,053	0.3	▲0.2
Independent Liberals	David Lloyd George	6	4	New		▲4	0.7	103,528	0.5	New
Communist	Harry; Pollitt	26	0	0	0	Steady	—	74,824	0.3	▲0.1
New Party	Oswald Mosley	24	0	New			—	36,377	0.2	New
National Independent	—N/a	3	2 (Note: Austin Hopkinson in Mossley and Ernest Graham-Little in London University.)	New		▲2	0.3	33,468	0.2	New
Scottish Prohibition	Edwin Scrymgeour	1	0	0	1 (Note: Edwin Scrymgeour in Dundee.)	▼1	—	32,229	0.1	New
National (Scotland)	Roland Muirhead	5	0	0	0	Steady	—	20,954	0.1	▲0.1
Independent Labour	—N/a	2	0	0	1 (Note: Neil Maclean in Glasgow Govan re-contested and won the seat, but was the official Labour candidate in this election.)	▼1	—	18,200	0.1	Steady
Independent	—N/a	3	1	1 (Note: Eleanor Rathbone in Combined English Universities.)	0	▲1	0.2	8,431	0.0	Steady
Liverpool Protestant	Harry Dixon Longbottom	1 (Note: Leader Harry Dixon Longbottom stood in Liverpool Kirkdale.)	0	New			—	7,834	0.0	New
Agricultural	J. F. Wright	1 (Note: Candidate John Alexander Whitehead stood in Isle of Ely.)	0	New			—	6,993	0.0	New
Independent National	—N/a	1 (Note: Candidate Archibald Church in London University.)	0	New			—	3,134	0.0	New
Independent Liberal	—N/a	1 (Note: Candidate Frank Sykes in Halifax.)	0	0	0	Steady	—	2,578	0.0	▼0.1
Workers	—N/a	1 (Note: Candidate Reginald Bridgeman stood in Uxbridge.)	0	New			—	2,358	0.0	New
Plaid Cymru	Saunders Lewis	1 (Note: Candidate John Edward Daniel stood in Caernarvonshire.)	0	0	0	Steady	—	2,050	0.0	Steady
Commonwealth Land	—N/a	2	0	New			—	1,347	0.0	New
Other non-contested		0	0	—N/a		▼1 (Note: Irish Nationalist T. P. O'Connor in Liverpool Scotland.)	—	0	0.0	—N/a
Total		1,292	615			0	100.0	21,656,373	100.0	0.0
Registered voters, and turnout								29,952,361 (Note: Including the electorate in uncontested constituencies.)	76.4 (Note: Adjusted for multi-member constituencies.)	▲0.1

=== Votes summary ===
Popular vote
Conservative	55.21%
Labour	31.04%
Liberal	6.54%
National Liberal	3.70%
Nat. Labour	1.54%
Others	1.98%

Popular vote (as National Gov't)
National Gov't	67.47%
Labour	31.04%
Others	1.49%

=== Seats summary ===
Parliamentary seats
Conservative	76.42%
Labour	8.46%
National Liberal	5.69%
Liberal	5.20%
Nat. Labour	2.11%
Others	2.11%

Parliamentary seats (as National Gov't)
National Gov't	90.08%
Labour	8.46%
Others	1.46%

== Transfers of seats ==
This differs from the above list in including seats where the incumbent was standing down and therefore there was no possibility of any one person being defeated. The aim is to provide a comparison with the previous election. In addition, it provides information about which party gained the seat.

- All comparisons are with the 1929 election.
  - In some cases the change is due to the MP defecting to the gaining party. Such circumstances are marked with a *.
  - In other circumstances the change is due to the seat having been won by the gaining party in a by-election in the intervening years, and then retained in 1931. Such circumstances are marked with a †.

To	From	No.	Seats
Ind. Labour Party	Labour	3	Merthyr*, Shettleston*, Bridgeton*
Independent Labour gains:		3	
Labour	Independent Labour	1	Govan*
Labour	Nationalist	1	Liverpool Scotland†
Labour gains:		2	
Liberal	Labour	16	Dundee (one of two), Paisley, Edinburgh East, South Shields, Durham, Bristol North, Leicester West, Lambeth North, Whitechapel and St Georges, Walsall, Middlesbrough East, Bradford South, Dewsbury, Colne Valley^{2}, Wrexham, Carmarthen
Liberal gains:		16	
National Labour	Labour	13	Kilmarnock*, Ilkeston, Derby (one of two)*, Seaham*, Forest of Dean, Ormskirk*, Finsbury*, Tottenham South, Bassetlaw*, Nottingham South*, Lichfield*, Leeds Central*, Cardiff C*
National Liberal	Labour	10	Dunfermline Burghs, Bishop Auckland, Consett, Gateshead, Southampton (one of two), Shoreditch, Southwark North, Huddersfield, Barnsley, Swansea West
National Liberal	Liberal	25	Inverness*, Ross and Cromarty*, Western Isles*, Montrose Burghs*, Fife East*, Greenock*, Leith*, Luton*, Huntingdonshire*, Eddisbury*, St Ives*, Devonport*, South Molton*, Harwich*, Bosworth*, Holland with Boston*, Great Yarmouth*, Norfolk East*, Norwich (one of two)*, Newcastle upon Tyne East*, Eye*, Spen Valley*, Denbigh*, Flintshire*, Montgomeryshire*
National Liberal gains:		37	
National Independent	Labour	1	Mossley
National	Labour	4	Southwark Central, Burslem, Burnley, Southampton (one of two)
Conservative	Scottish Prohibition	1	Dundee (one of two)
Conservative	Labour	193	Aberdeen N, Stirling and Falkirk, Clackmannan and E Stirlingshire, Stirlingshire W, Fife W, Kirkcaldy Burghs, Dunbartonshire, Lanark, Partick, Lanarkshire N, Renfrewshire W, Maryhill, Motherwell, Camlachie, Bothwell, Coatbridge, Springburn, Rutherglen, Tradeston, Ayrshire S, Edinburgh W, Edinburgh C, Midlothian S & Peebles, Linlithgow, Berwick & Haddington, Reading, Birkenhead W, Crewe, Stalybridge and Hyde, Stockport (one of two), Carlisle, Whitehaven, Derbyshire NE, Chesterfield, Derby (one of two), Belper, Derbyshire S, Drake, Blaydon, Houghton-le-Spring, Jarrow, Barnard Castle, Sedgefield, Darlington, Stockton-on-Tees, Sunderland (one of two), Sunderland (one of two)†, Leyton E, East Ham N, East Ham S, Essex SE, Leyton W, Romford, Walthamstow E, Upton, Bristol C, Bristol S, Portsmouth C, Dudley, Stourbridge, Kingston upon Hull C, Kingston upon Hull E, Kingston upon Hull SW, Chatham^{2}, Dartford, Accrington, Barrow-in-Furness, Blackburn (both seats), Nelson and Colne, Preston (one of two), Rossendale, Ashton-under-Lyne, Bolton (both seats), Eccles, Farnworth, Ardwick, Clayton, Gorton, Hulme, Platting, Oldham (both seats), Rochdale, Salford N, Salford S, Salford W, Bootle, Edge Hill, Everton, Kirkdale, W Toxteth, Newton, St Helens, Warrington, Widnes, Leicester E, Loughborough, Brigg, Lincoln, Battersea N, Battersea S, Camberwell N, Camberwell NW, Deptford, Greenwich, Hackney C, Hackney S, Hammersmith N, Hammersmith S, Islington E, Islington N, Islington S, Islington W, Kennington, Kensington N, Peckham, Rotherhithe, St Pancras N, St Pancras SE, St Pancras SW, Fulham W†, Southwark SE, Mile End, Wandsworth C^{2}, Acton, Enfield, Willesden W, Edmonton, Tottenham N, Norfolk N, Norfolk SW, Norwich (one of two), Kettering, Northampton, Peterborough, Wellingborough, Morpeth, Newcastle C, Newcastle W, Wallsend, Wansbeck, Nottingham W, The Wrekin, Frome, Cannock, Hanley, Kingswinford, Leek, Smethwick^{1}, Stoke^{1}, Wednesbury, W Bromwich, Bilston, Wolverhampton W^{4}, Nuneaton, Duddeston, Coventry, Aston^{1}, Deritend, Erdington, Ladywood, Yardley, Swindon, York, Cleveland, Sheffield C, Bradford N, Sowerby, Elland, Leeds W, Halifax, Bradford E, Shipley†, Wakefield, Sheffield Park, Rotherham, Bradford C, Keighley, Pontefract, Hillsborough, Attercliffe, Brightside, Penistone, Leeds S, Doncaster, Batley and Morley, Newport, Brecon and Radnor, Llandaff & Barry, Cardiff E, Cardiff S
Conservative	Liberal	13	Aberdeenshire W & Kincardine, Galloway^{1}, Bedfordshire Mid, Camborne, Penryn & Falmouth, Dorset E, Hereford, Ashford, Preston (one of two)^{3}, Heywood & Radcliffe, Blackley, Withington, Nottingham E
Conservative	Independent	1	Stretford
Conservative	Ind. Conservative	1	Exeter
Conservative gains:		210	

^{1} Sitting MP had defected to the New Party
^{2} Sitting MP had defected to National Labour
^{3} Sitting MP had defected to Labour
^{4} Sitting MP had defected to Independent Labour

== Results by constituency ==
These are available at the PoliticsResources website, a link to which is given below.

== See also ==
- List of MPs elected in the 1931 United Kingdom general election
- 1931 United Kingdom general election in England
- 1931 United Kingdom general election in Scotland
- 1931 United Kingdom general election in Wales
- 1931 United Kingdom general election in Northern Ireland
- List of MPs for constituencies in Wales (1931–1935)
