= 1922 Labour Party leadership election (UK) =

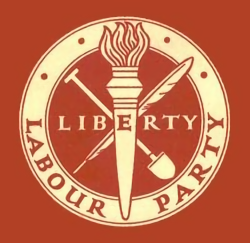
21 November 1922	1931 →
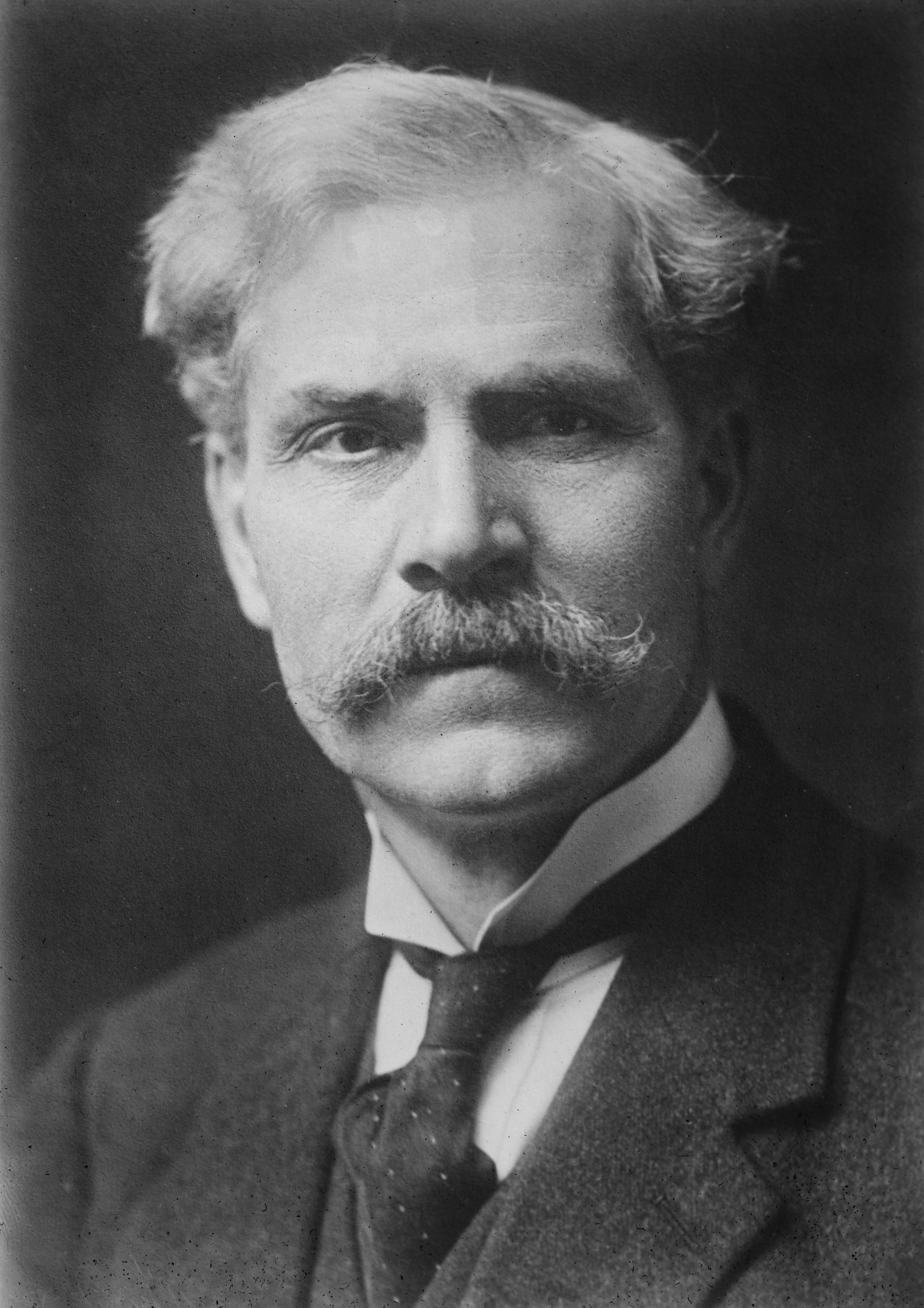

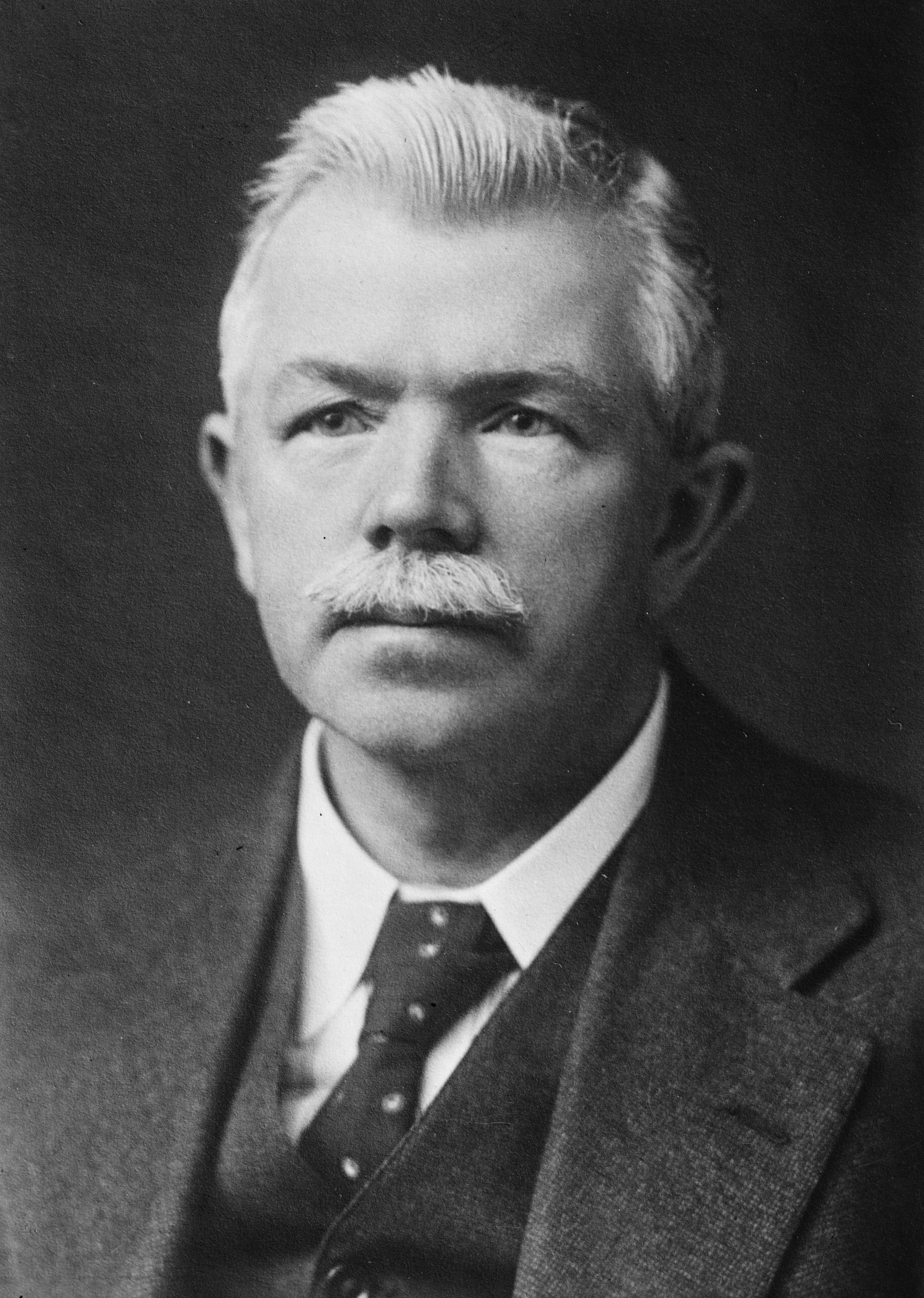
Candidate	Ramsay MacDonald	J. R. Clynes
Popular vote	61	56
Percentage	52.1%	47.9%
Leader before election
J. R. Clynes
Elected Leader
Ramsay MacDonald

The 1922 Labour Party leadership election was the first leadership election for the posts of chairman and leader of the Parliamentary Labour Party. Previously the position had been simply the "Chairman of the Parliamentary Labour Party".

The election took place when the incumbent chairman J. R. Clynes was challenged by the former leader Ramsay MacDonald. MacDonald opposed the way Clynes led the party.

== Candidates ==
- John Clynes, incumbent leader of the Labour Party, Member of Parliament (MP) for Manchester Platting
- Ramsay MacDonald, former leader of the Labour Party, MP for Aberavon

== Result ==
Ramsay MacDonald was elected in a single ballot of Labour MPs on 14 December.

Only ballot: 21 November 1922
Candidate	Votes	%
Ramsay MacDonald	61	52.14
J. R. Clynes	56	47.86
Majority	5	4.28
Turnout	117	82.39
Ramsay MacDonald elected

== Aftermath ==
Following the election Clynes was given the newly created office of deputy leader of the Labour Party. As Labour leader, MacDonald became prime minister in 1924 and from 1929 to 1931, at which point he became head of a National Government that was opposed by the bulk of the Labour Party. He was succeeded as party leader by Arthur Henderson. MacDonald was subsequently expelled from the party. In 1932, George Lansbury became leader unopposed, as one of the few experienced Labour MPs left in Parliament, but trades union opposition to his pacifism led to his resignation in 1935 and replacement by his deputy Clement Attlee. A month later Attlee was challenged in a new election.
