= 1931 United Kingdom general election in Northern Ireland =

- 27 October 1931

13 seats in Northern Ireland of the 615 seats in the House of Commons
- Turnout: 74.5% (▲10.7 pp)

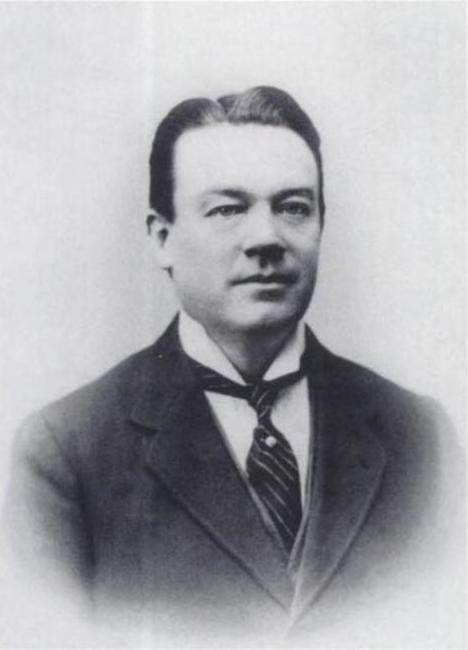
| | First party | Second party |
|---|---|---|
| Leader | Viscount Craigavon | Joseph Devlin |
| Party | UUP | Nationalist |
| Alliance | Conservative & National Government |
| Leader since | 1921 | 1918 |
| Leader's seat | Did not stand | Fermanagh and Tyrone |
| Last election | 11 seats, 68.0% | 2 seats, 6.6% |
| Seats won | 11 (Note: Includes 9 members elected unopposed.) | 2 |
| Seat change | Steady | Steady |
| Popular vote | 104,555 (Note: Voting took place in 4 of 13 seats. The other MPs were unopposed.) | 72,633 |
| Percentage | 56.1% | 38.9% |
| Swing | ▼11.9% | ▲32.3% |

The 1931 United Kingdom general election in Northern Ireland was held on 27 October as part of the wider general election. There were ten constituencies, seven single-seat constituencies with MPs elected by FPTP and three two-seat constituencies with MPs elected by bloc voting.

Unable to secure support from his cabinet for his preferred policy responses to the economic and social crises brought about by the Great Depression, Prime Minister Ramsay MacDonald split from the Labour Party and formed a new national government in coalition with the Conservative Party and a number of Liberals. MacDonald subsequently campaigned for a "Doctor's Mandate" to do whatever was necessary to fix the economy, running as the leader of a new party called National Labour within the coalition. Disagreement over whether to join the new government also resulted in the Liberal Party splitting into three separate factions, including one led by former Prime Minister David Lloyd George.

Collectively, the parties forming the National Government won 67% of the popular vote and 554 (90.1%) of 615 seats in the House of Commons. Although the bulk of the National Government's support came from the Conservative Party, which won a majority in its own right with 470 seats, MacDonald remained Prime Minister. The Labour Party suffered its greatest ever defeat—losing four-fifths of its seats, including the seat of leader Arthur Henderson—and became the official opposition with just 52 MPs. The collapse of the Liberals into competing factions also ended their time as a significant force in British politics; the breakaway National Liberals were eventually absorbed into the Conservatives in 1947, while the main Liberal Party would remain in the political wilderness until its revival in the 1970s.

It is the most recent election in which any single party (the Conservatives, including the Ulster Unionist Party which stood under the Conservative Whip) received an absolute majority of the votes cast, and the last UK general election not to take place on a Thursday. It was also the last election until 1997 in which any single party won more than 400 seats.

== Candidates ==
Below is a table summarising the candidates of the 1931 general election in Northern Ireland in the county and borough constituencies, and those in Queen's University of Belfast.

| Affiliation | Candidates |
|---|---|
| Ulster Unionist Party | 13 |
| Nationalist Party | 3 |
| Northern Ireland Labour Party | 1 (Note: Candidate John Campbell stood in Belfast East.) |
| Total | 17 |

== Results ==
This election saw no change in the distribution of seats for Northern Ireland.

In the election as a whole, a National Government which had been formed before the election was returned with Ramsay MacDonald of National Labour as Prime Minister. Also in the government were the Conservative Party, which included the Ulster Unionists, and the Liberal Party. Nine of the eleven Ulster Unionist MPs were elected unopposed.

| Party | Leader | Candidates | Seats | | | | | Aggregate votes | | |
| Party | Leader | Candidates | Total | Gains | Losses | Net | Of total (%) | Total | Of total (%) (Note: Adjusted for multi-member constituencies.) | Change (%) |
|---|---|---|---|---|---|---|---|---|---|---|
| UUP | Viscount; Craigavon | 13 | 11 | 0 | 2 | Steady | 84.6 | 149,566 | 56.1 | ▼11.9 |
| Nationalist | Joseph; Devlin | 3 | 2 | 0 | 0 | Steady | 15.4 | 123,053 | 38.9 | ▲32.3 |
| NI Labour | Jack; Beattie | 1 | 0 | Did not stand in 1929 | | | — | 9,410 | 5.0 | —N/a |
| Total | | 17 | 13 | | | 0 | 100.0 | 282,029 | 100.0 | 0.0 |
| Registered voters, and turnout | | | | | | | | 252,124 (Note: Electorate in contested constituencies. The total electorate was 773,302.) | 74.5 | ▲10.7 |

=== Popular vote ===
Popular vote
| UUP | 56.1% |
| National | 38.9% |
| NI Labour | 5.0% |

Popular vote (coalitions)
| Nat. Gov. | 56.1% |
| National | 38.9% |
| NI Labour | 5.0% |

=== Parliamentary seats ===
Parliamentary seats
| UUP | 84.6% |
| Ind. Unionist | 15.4% |

Parliamentary seats (coalitions)
| Nat. Gov. | 84.6% |
| Ind. Unionist | 15.4% |

== MPs elected ==
| Constituency | Party | MP |
|---|---|---|
| Antrim | Ulster Unionist | Sir Joseph McConnell, Bt |
| Antrim | Ulster Unionist | Hugh O'Neill |
| Armagh | Ulster Unionist | William Allen |
| Belfast East | Ulster Unionist | Herbert Dixon |
| Belfast North | Ulster Unionist | Thomas Somerset |
| Belfast South | Ulster Unionist | William Stewart |
| Belfast West | Ulster Unionist | Alexander Browne |
| Down | Ulster Unionist | Viscount Castlereagh |
| Down | Ulster Unionist | David Reid |
| Fermanagh and Tyrone | Nationalist | Joseph Devlin |
| Fermanagh and Tyrone | Nationalist | Cahir Healy |
| Londonderry | Ulster Unionist | Ronald Ross |
| Queen's University of Belfast | Ulster Unionist | Thomas Sinclair |

== See also ==
- 1931 United Kingdom general election in England
- 1931 United Kingdom general election in Scotland
- 1931 United Kingdom general election in Wales
