= List of MPs for constituencies in Wales (1931–1935) =

- 27 October 1931
- Colours on map indicate the party allegiance of each constituency's MP.

This is a list of members of Parliament in Wales, elected to the House of Commons of the United Kingdom in the 1931 general election.

== Composition ==
Affiliation	Members
Labour Party	15
Conservative Party	6
Liberal Party	5
National Liberal	4
Indepedent Liberal	4
National Labour	1
Independent Labour Party	1
Total	36

== MPs ==
MP	Constituency	Party	In constituency since
Ernest Bennett	Cardiff Central	National Labour	1929
Aneurin Bevan	Ebbw Vale	Labour Party	1929
Reginald Clarry	Newport	Conservative Party	1931
William Cove	Aberavon	Labour Party	1929
George Daggar	Abertillery	Labour Party	1929
Clement Davies	Montgomeryshire	National Liberal	1929
Charles Edwards	Bedwellty	Labour Party	1918
Arthur Evans	Cardiff South	Conservative Party	1931
Richard Thomas Evans	Carmarthen	Liberal Party	1931
Leolin Forestier-Walker	Monmouth	Conservative Party	1918
Thomas Griffiths	Pontypool	Labour Party	1918
John Henry Williams	Llanelli	Labour Party	1922
David Grenfell	Gower	Labour Party	1922
George Hall	Aberdare	Labour Party	1922
Walter Hall	Brecon and Radnor	Conservative Party	1931
Vernon Hartshorn	Ogmore	Labour Party	1918
William Jenkins	Neath	Labour Party	1922
William John	Rhondda West	Labour Party	1920 by-election
Henry Haydn Jones	Merioneth	Liberal Party	January 1910
Lewis Jones	Swansea West	National Liberal	1931
Morgan Jones	Caerphilly	Labour Party	1921 by-election
Thomas Mardy Jones	Pontypridd	Labour Party	1922 by-election
David Lloyd George	Caernarvon Boroughs	Independent Liberal	1890
Gwilym Lloyd George	Pembrokeshire	Independent Liberal	1929
Megan Lloyd George	Anglesey	Independent Liberal	1929
Henry Morris-Jones	Denbigh	National Liberal	1929
Rhys Hopkin Morris	Cardiganshire	Liberal Party	1923
Patrick Munro	Llandaff and Barry	Conservative Party	1931
Goronwy Owen	Caernarvonshire	Independent Liberal	1923
Aled Roberts	Wrexham	Liberal Party	1931
Frederick Llewellyn-Jones	Flintshire	National Liberal	1929
Owen Temple-Morris	Cardiff East	Conservative Party	1931
R. C. Wallhead	Merthyr	Independent Labour Party	1922
David Watts-Morgan	Rhondda East	Labour Party	1918
David Williams	Swansea East	Labour Party	1922
Ernest Evans	University of Wales	Liberal Party	1924

== By-elections ==
- 1934 Monmouth by-election
- 1934 Merthyr by-election
- 1933 Rhondda East by-election
- 1932 Cardiganshire by-election

== See also ==
- List of MPs elected in the 1931 United Kingdom general election
- 1931 United Kingdom general election
- 1931 United Kingdom general election in Wales
