= Unendorsed Labour candidates, 1931 =

At the British general election of 1931, 25 candidates closely connected to the Labour Party stood for election without the party's official endorsement, primarily as a result of disagreements over changes in the party's rules introduced shortly before the election. All but one of the candidates were members of the Independent Labour Party which was then affiliated to the Labour Party; the remaining candidate had been adopted by a Constituency Labour Party whom the central party thought lacked the finance and organisation to fight the election. Six of these candidates were elected, one of whom through an unopposed nomination.

== Background ==
During the second Labour Government from 1929, the Independent Labour Party had become increasingly alienated from the party as a whole. Although 142 out of the 287 Labour MPs were members of the ILP, most took membership automatically and only a small number were aligned with the leadership. At the 1930 conference of the ILP, a resolution was passed that henceforth ILP MPs should back its policy instead of Labour Party policy where the two were in conflict; 18 MPs accepted this resolution, and formed a quasi-independent group in Parliament under the leadership of James Maxton (MP for Glasgow Bridgeton). The Labour Party objected to this situation and refused to give endorsement to ILP sponsored candidates in by-elections unless they signed a pledge which effectively reversed the conference decision.

In 1931 the Parliamentary Labour Party adopted a new set of Standing Orders which tightened up on discipline, and required that Labour MPs support the party programme. The new standing orders were endorsed at the Labour Party conference in October 1931 by 2,117,000 to 193,000, and on 7 October 1931 (the day after the general election was called), the National Executive Committee ruled that all candidates would have to sign an undertaking to abide by the new standing orders in order to receive official endorsement. Maxton considered that the conference decision effectively expelled him from the party and refused to sign.

== Candidates ==
The last-minute nature of preparations for the general election led to a scramble to adopt candidates. Eventually 25 candidates were nominated. The Labour Party's reaction to them varied. Six were elected.

Constituency	Candidate	Votes	%	Notes
Bradford East	Frederick William Jowett	15,779	41.2	Official candidate of the ILP. Sitting MP defeated.
Bute and Northern Ayrshire	Alexander Sloan	10,227	29.5	Official candidate of the ILP.
Camborne	Kate Florence Spurrell	8,280	24.5	Official candidate of the ILP.
Clapham	Hilda Alice Browning	7,317	23.0	Official candidate of the ILP.
Dumbarton Burghs	David Kirkwood	16,335	51.6	Member of the ILP sponsored by the CLP. Sitting MP re-elected.
Glasgow Bridgeton	James Maxton	16,630	58.2	Official candidate of the ILP. Sitting MP re-elected.
Glasgow Camlachie	Rev. Campbell Stephen	15,282	45.3	Official candidate of the ILP. Sitting MP defeated.
Glasgow Gorbals	George Buchanan	19,278	58.1	Member of the ILP sponsored by the CLP. Sitting MP re-elected.
Glasgow Hillhead	Charles Aloysius O'Donnell	7,539	26.2	Sponsored by the CLP, against a decision by the Glasgow Burgh Labour Party not to fight the seat.
Glasgow Kelvingrove	John Winning	12,415	36.6	Official candidate of the ILP.
Glasgow Shettleston	John McGovern	16,301	47.8	Official candidate of the ILP. Sitting MP re-elected. An official Labour candidate stood in the constituency.
Kilmarnock	John Pollock	14,767	40.4	Official candidate of the ILP.
Lanark	Jack Gibson	11,815	36.4	Official candidate of the ILP.
North Lanarkshire	Janet Lee	19,691	44.7	Official candidate of the ILP. Sitting MP defeated.
Leyton East	Archibald Fenner Brockway	10,433	37.6	Official candidate of the ILP. Sitting MP defeated.
Liverpool Kirkdale	Elijah Sandham	9,531	30.1	Official candidate of the ILP. Sitting MP defeated.
Merthyr	Richard Collingham Wallhead	24,623	69.4	Official candidate of the ILP. Sitting MP re-elected.
Newcastle-under-Lyme	Josiah Clement Wedgwood	Unopposed		Member of the ILP sponsored by the CLP. Sitting MP re-elected.
Newcastle upon Tyne Central	Sir Charles Philip Trevelyan, Bt.	12,136	37.3	Member of the ILP sponsored by the CLP. Sitting MP defeated.
Norwich	Dorothy Jewson	26,537	19.7	Official candidate of the ILP. Ran in conjunction with an official Labour candidate in a two-member seat. Labour MP for seat 1923-1924.
Peckham	John Warburton Beckett	11,217	33.5	Official candidate of the ILP. Sitting MP defeated. An official Labour candidate stood in the constituency.
Perth	Helen Eaton Gault	3,705	9.7	Official candidate of the ILP.
West Renfrewshire	Jean Mann	10,203	31.5	Official candidate of the ILP.
Stockport	John Thomas Abbott	15,591	11.3	Official candidate of the ILP. Two-member seat; the official Labour candidate refused to run a joint campaign.
Warwick and Leamington	Charles George Garton	9,261	19.4	Member of the ILP sponsored by the CLP.

== Aftermath ==
In the new Parliament, James Maxton, together with John McGovern and Richard Wallhead, formed a separate Independent Labour Party Parliamentary group. David Kirkwood and George Buchanan subsequently joined the group. Later in the Parliament, Kirkwood and Wallhead rejoined the Parliamentary Labour Party. Wedgwood did not join the ILP group and took the Labour whip once Parliament met.
