= Polling Day (United Kingdom) =

Day on which political elections are held in the UK

Polling Day or Election Day in the United Kingdom is by convention a Thursday. Polls in the United Kingdom open at 7:00 and close at 22:00 or 10:00 pm.

== General elections ==
It has been suggested that this tradition arose as the best of several circumstances: Friday pay-packets would lead to more drunken voters on Fridays and weekends; having the election as far after a Sunday as possible would reduce the influence of Sunday sermons; many towns held markets on Thursdays, thus the local population would be travelling to town that day anyway.

Before the Fixed-term Parliaments Act 2011 and again since it was repealed, a general election in the UK follows the dissolution of Parliament by the Monarch on the advice of the Prime Minister of the day. The Prime Minister thus has the power to choose the date of the election. Thursday has been the customary day to hold elections since the 1930s. The Levellers proposed that elections be held on the first Thursday in every second March in the Agreement of the People in 1647.

Between 2011 and 2022, under the Fixed-term Parliaments Act all future General Elections were automatically scheduled on the first Thursday in May every five years, barring special circumstances; only one such election took place in 2015. To call an early election, either a vote of no confidence in the government, which required a simple majority, or a vote in favour of an earlier election, which required a two-thirds majority of the House of Commons was needed. Only one election took place through these means in 2017.

Historically, elections took place over the course of a four-week period until 1918. Election days were then as follows:

14 December 1918	–	Saturday
15 November 1922	–	Wednesday
6 December 1923	–	Thursday
29 October 1924	–	Wednesday
30 May 1929	–	Thursday
27 October 1931	–	Tuesday

and elections have been on Thursdays since then:

14 November 1935	18 June 1970	7 June 2001
5 July 1945	28 February 1974	5 May 2005
23 February 1950	10 October 1974	6 May 2010
25 October 1951	3 May 1979	7 May 2015
26 May 1955	9 June 1983	8 June 2017
8 October 1959	11 June 1987	12 December 2019
15 October 1964	9 April 1992	4 July 2024
31 March 1966	1 May 1997	

== Other elections ==
Local elections in England and Wales are by statute held on the first Thursday in May. This has been changed in recent years: in 2001 they were delayed while an outbreak of foot-and-mouth disease was dealt with and in 2020 they were postponed by a year due to the COVID-19 pandemic. In 2004, 2009 & 2014 local elections were delayed in order to allow the elections to be held simultaneously with the European Parliament. However, the elections were separate in 2019. In all cases, the elections were held on Thursdays.

By-elections and other UK elections are also traditionally held on Thursdays though they can be held on other days – in particular when they would otherwise clash with bank holidays. The last Parliamentary by-election not to be held on a Thursday was the Hamilton by-election of 31 May 1978. This was held on a Wednesday as the returning officer wished to avoid a clash with the opening game of the 1978 FIFA World Cup. Today, council by-elections are still occasionally held on days other than Thursday.

From 1997 to 2015, general elections occurred on the same days as the annual scheduled local government elections; however, this ended in 2017 with the local elections on 4 May and the general election on 8 June.

== See also ==
- Election day – most other European countries hold elections on Sundays.
