= 1931 Labour Party leadership election =

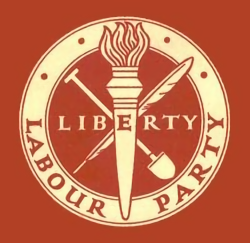
- 28 August 1931
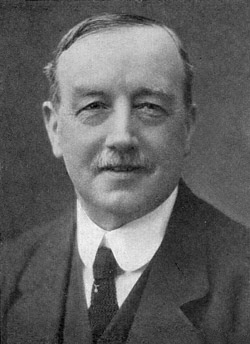
Candidate	Arthur Henderson
Popular vote	Unopposed
Leader before election
Ramsay MacDonald
Elected Leader
Arthur Henderson

The 1931 Labour Party leadership election took place on 28 August 1931 following the expulsion of incumbent Leader Ramsay MacDonald from the Party.

== Background ==
In response to the great depression there had been a run on the Bank of England in early 1931. As a result, a Committee on National Expenditure was formed, chaired by George May. The result was the May Report published on 31 July which suggested significant spending cuts, including a 10% cut to the unemployment benefit. While a narrow majority (11 to 9) of the cabinet supported this, those opposed, led by Foreign Secretary Arthur Henderson, told MacDonald that they were prepared to resign from the government if that was implemented. Left in an untenable position, MacDonald tended his resignation to the King on 24 August. However instead of accepting it the King urged MacDonald to form a National Government with the main opposition parties, the Conservatives and the Liberals. When this was announced later that day the majority of Labour ministers resigned and a meeting of Parliamentary Labour Party was set for the following Thursday.

At that meeting MacDonald and the other Labour members of the National Government were expelled from party and leadership declared vacant.

== Candidates ==
=== Declared candidates ===
- Arthur Henderson, former Leader, Member of Parliament for Burnley

=== Potential candidates who declined to run ===
- J. R. Clynes, incumbent Deputy Leader, Member of Parliament for Manchester Platting

== Results ==
Arthur Henderson was the only candidate who stood, and was elected Leader unopposed by the Parliamentary Labour Party.
