= List of MPs for constituencies in Wales (1935–1945) =

- 14 November 1935
- Colours on map indicate the party allegiance of each constituency's MP.

This is a list of members of Parliament in Wales, elected to the House of Commons of the United Kingdom in the 1935 general election.

== Composition ==
Affiliation	Members
Labour Party	18
Conservative Party	6
Independent Liberals (Note: All four members of the Liberal Independents would rejoin the Liberal Party a month after the election 1935, however were elected as Liberal Independents at the election.)	4
Liberal Party	3
National Liberal	3
National Independent	1
National Labour	1
Total	36

== MPs ==
MP	Constituency	Party	In constituency since
Ernest Bennett	Cardiff Central	National Labour	1929
Aneurin Bevan	Ebbw Vale	Labour Party	1929
Reginald Clarry	Newport	Conservative Party	1931
William Cove	Aberavon	Labour Party	1929
George Daggar	Abertillery	Labour Party	1929
Clement Davies	Montgomeryshire	National Liberal	1929
David Lewis Davies	Pontypridd	Labour Party	1931 by-election
S. O. Davies	Merthyr	Labour Party	1934 by-election
Charles Edwards	Bedwellty	Labour Party	1918
Arthur Evans	Cardiff South	Conservative Party	1931
Owen Evans	Cardiganshire	Liberal Party	1932 by-election
John Henry Williams (Note: Williams died of pneumonia in 1936, leading to the 1936 by-election in which Labour candidate Jim Griffiths retained the seat for the party.)	Llanelli	Labour Party	1922
David Grenfell	Gower	Labour Party	1922
Ivor Guest	Brecon and Radnor	National Government	1935
George Hall	Aberdare	Labour Party	1922
John Herbert	Monmouth	Conservative Party	1934 by-election
Daniel Hopkin	Carmarthen	Labour Party	1935
Arthur Jenkins	Pontypool	Labour Party	1935
William Jenkins	Neath	Labour Party	1922
William John	Rhondda West	Labour Party	1920 by-election
Henry Haydn Jones	Merioneth	Liberal Party	January 1910
Lewis Jones	Swansea West	National Liberal	1931
Morgan Jones	Caerphilly	Labour Party	1921 by-election
David Lloyd George	Caernarvon Boroughs	Independent Liberals	1890
Gwilym Lloyd George	Pembrokeshire	Independent Liberals	1929
Megan Lloyd George	Anglesey	Independent Liberals	1929
William Mainwaring	Rhondda East	Labour Party	1933 by-election
Henry Morris-Jones	Denbigh	National Liberal	1929
Patrick Munro	Llandaff and Barry	Conservative Party	1931
Goronwy Owen	Caernarvonshire	Independent Liberals	1923
Robert Richards	Wrexham	Labour Party	1935
Gwilym Rowlands	Flintshire	Conservative Party	1935
Owen Temple-Morris	Cardiff East	Conservative Party	1931
David Williams	Swansea East	Labour Party	1922
Ted Williams	Ogmore	Labour Party	1931 by-election
William John Gruffydd	University of Wales	Liberal Party	1945

== By-elections ==
- Newport
- Neath
- Caernarvon Boroughs
- Llandaff and Barry
- Cardiff East
- Caerphilly
- Carmarthen
- Swansea East
- Brecon and Radnorshire
- Monmouth
- Pontypridd
- Llanelli

== See also ==
- List of MPs elected in the 1935 United Kingdom general election
- 1935 United Kingdom general election
