= List of MPs elected in the 1935 United Kingdom general election =

1935–1945 Parliament of the United Kingdom
←	1931–1935 Parliament	1945–1950 Parliament	→
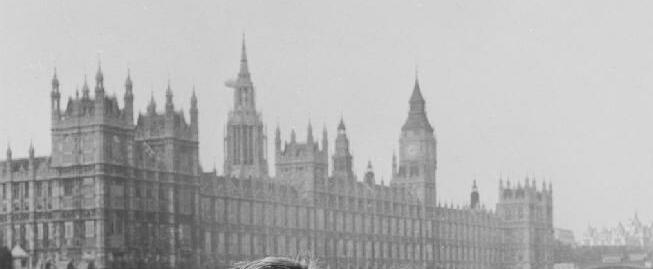
- Palace of Westminster in 1942

Overview
- Legislative body: Parliament of the United Kingdom
- Term: 14 November 1935 – 26 July 1945
- Election: 1935 United Kingdom general election
- Government: Third National Government; Fourth National Government; Chamberlain war ministry Churchill war ministry Churchill caretaker ministry

House of Commons
- Members: 614
- Speaker: Edward FitzRoy; Douglas Clifton Brown
- Leader: Stanley Baldwin; Neville Chamberlain; Winston Churchill; Stafford Cripps; Anthony Eden
- Prime Minister: Stanley Baldwin; Neville Chamberlain; Winston Churchill
- Leader of the Opposition: Clement Attlee; Hastings Lees-Smith (Note: During World War II a succession of three Labour politicians acted as Leader of the Opposition for the purpose of allowing the House of Commons to function normally; however as in the mid World War I ministry, opposition did not run under a party-whipped system. As the Government 1940–45 was a coalition government in which Labour politicians functioned fully as members of the Government, neither Deputy Prime Minister Clement Attlee nor these three received the salary for the post of Leader of the Opposition. The largest party that opposed the war and was not part of the coalition – and therefore, in theory, the opposition – was the Independent Labour Party, led by James Maxton. With only three MPs, it tried to take over the opposition frontbench but was widely opposed in this venture.); Frederick Pethick-Lawrence; Arthur Greenwood; Clement Attlee
- Third-party leader: Archibald Sinclair

House of Lords
- Lord Chancellor: Viscount Hailsham; Baron Maugham; Viscount Caldecote

Crown-in-Parliament George V → Edward VIII → George VI

Sessions
- 1st: 26 November 1935 – 30 October 1936
- 2nd: 3 November 1936 – 22 October 1937
- 3rd: 26 October 1937 – 4 November 1938
- 4th: 8 November 1938 – 23 November 1939
- 5th: 28 November 1939 – 20 November 1940
- 6th: 21 November 1940 – 11 November 1941
- 7th: 12 November 1941 – 10 November 1942
- 8th: 11 November 1942 – 23 November 1943
- 9th: 24 November 1943 – 28 November 1944

Special sessions
- 10th: 29 November 1944 – 15 June 1945

This is a list of members of Parliament elected at the 1935 general election, held on 14 November. Due to the onset of the Second World War, this was the last general election before 1945, making it the longest UK parliament in history and the longest parliament to sit in Westminster since the Cavalier Parliament of 1661–1679.

== History ==
- A declaration was made to Parliament 3 September 1939 by PM Neville Chamberlain that "this country is at war with Germany", as it had been since 9am that day upon the expiration of an unobserved deadline to cease German fire in Poland.
- The King commissioned a change in Administration on 10 May 1940, and Winston Churchill became Prime Minister on 13 May 1940 with a resolution "That this House welcomes the formation of a Government representing the united and inflexible resolve of the nation to prosecute the war with Germany to a victorious conclusion."
- On 29 January 1942, Clement Attlee's motion was voted, "That this House has confidence in His Majesty's Government and will aid it to the utmost in the vigorous prosecution of the War", and passed by a margin of 464 Ayes to 1 Noe (Maxton, J.).
- A motion to censure the Government of Churchill, "That this House, while paying tribute to the heroism and endurance of the Armed Forces of the Crown in circumstances of exceptional difficulty, has no confidence in the central direction of the war," was defeated on 2 July 1942 by a count of 475 Noes to 25 Ayes. Sir John Wardlaw-Milne was mover, and Mr. Aneurin Bevan was seconder.

== Composition ==
This diagram show the composition of the parties in the 1935 general election.

Note: This is not the official seating plan of the House of Commons, which has five rows of benches on each side, with the government party to the right of the speaker and opposition parties to the left, but with room for only around two-thirds of MPs to sit at any one time. The Commons Chamber was hit by bombs and the roof of Westminster Hall was set on fire. The fire service said that it would be impossible to save both, so it was decided to concentrate on saving the Hall. The Commons Chamber was entirely destroyed by the fire which spread to the Members' Lobby and caused the ceiling to collapse. By the following morning, all that was left of the Chamber was a smoking shell. As the Commons Chamber was totally destroyed and the Lords Chamber was damaged, both Houses moved to the Church House annexe and sat there from 13 May. From late June 1941 until October 1950, the Commons met in the Lords Chamber, while the Lords met in the Robing Room (a fact which was kept secret during the war).

== A ==
Constituency	MP	Party
Aberavon	William Cove	Labour
Aberdare	George Hall	Labour
Aberdeen North	George Garro-Jones	Labour
Aberdeen South	Sir Douglas Thomson, Bt	Conservative
Aberdeenshire Central	Sir Robert Smith	Conservative
Aberdeenshire East	Robert Boothby	Conservative
Aberdeenshire West and Kincardine	Malcolm Barclay-Harvey	Conservative
Abertillery	George Daggar	Labour
Abingdon	Sir Ralph Glyn, Bt	Conservative
Accrington	Henry Procter	Conservative
Acton	Hubert Duggan	Conservative
Aldershot	Roundell Palmer	Conservative
Altrincham	Sir Edward Grigg	Conservative
Anglesey	Megan Lloyd George	Independent Liberal
Antrim (two members)	Hon. Sir Hugh O'Neill	Ulster Unionist
Antrim (two members)	Sir Joseph McConnell, Bt	Ulster Unionist
Argyllshire	Frederick Macquisten	Conservative
Armagh	Sir William Allen	Ulster Unionist
Ashford	Patrick Spens	Conservative
Ashton-under-Lyne	Fred Simpson	Labour
Aylesbury	Michael Beaumont	Conservative
Ayr Burghs	Thomas Moore	Conservative
Ayrshire North and Bute	Sir Charles MacAndrew	Conservative
Ayrshire South	The Rt Hon. James Brown	Labour
== B ==
Balham and Tooting	Sir Alfred Butt, Bt	Conservative
Banbury	Sir Albert Edmondson	Conservative
Banffshire	Sir John Findlay, Bt	Conservative
Barkston Ash	Leonard Ropner	Conservative
Barnard Castle	Thomas Sexton	Labour
Barnsley	John Potts	Labour
Barnstaple	Richard Acland	Liberal
Barrow-in-Furness	Sir Jonah Walker-Smith	Conservative
Basingstoke	Patrick Donner	Conservative
Bassetlaw	Frederick Bellenger	Labour
Bath	Loel Guinness	Conservative
Batley and Morley	Willie Brooke	Labour
Battersea North	William Sanders	Labour
Battersea South	Harry Selley	Conservative
Bedford	Richard Wells	Conservative
Bedfordshire Mid	Alan Lennox-Boyd	Conservative
Bedwellty	Charles Edwards	Labour
Belfast, East	Herbert Dixon	Ulster Unionist
Belfast, North	Thomas Somerset	Ulster Unionist
Belfast, South	William Stewart	Ulster Unionist
Belfast, West	Alexander Browne	Ulster Unionist
Belper	Herbert Wragg	Conservative
Bermondsey West	Alfred Salter	Labour
Berwick and Haddington	John McEwen	Conservative
Berwick-on-Tweed	Sir Hugh Seely, Bt	Liberal
Bethnal Green North-East	Dan Chater	Labour Co-op
Bethnal Green South-West	Sir Percy Harris, Bt	Liberal
Bewdley	The Rt Hon. Stanley Baldwin	Conservative
Birkenhead East	Graham White	Liberal
Birkenhead West	John Sandeman Allen	Conservative
Birmingham Aston	Hon. Arthur Hope	Conservative
Birmingham Deritend	Smedley Crooke	Conservative
Birmingham Duddeston	Oliver Simmonds	Conservative
Birmingham Edgbaston	Rt. Hon. Neville Chamberlain	Conservative
Birmingham Erdington	John Eales	Conservative
Birmingham Handsworth	Oliver Locker-Lampson	Conservative
Birmingham King's Norton	Ronald Cartland	Conservative
Birmingham Ladywood	Geoffrey Lloyd	Conservative
Birmingham Moseley	Sir Patrick Hannon	Conservative
Birmingham Sparkbrook	Rt. Hon. Leo Amery	Conservative
Birmingham West	Rt. Hon. Sir Austen Chamberlain	Conservative
Birmingham Yardley	Edward Salt	Conservative
Bishop Auckland	Hugh Dalton	Labour
Blackburn (two members)	W. D. Smiles	Conservative
Blackburn (two members)	George Elliston	Conservative
Blackpool	Roland Robinson	Conservative
Blaydon	William Whiteley	Labour
Bodmin	John Rathbone	Conservative
Bolton (two members)	Cyril Entwistle	Conservative
Bolton (two members)	Sir John Haslam	Conservative
Bootle	Eric Errington	Conservative
Bosworth	William Edge	Liberal National
Bothwell	James C. Welsh	Labour
Bournemouth	Sir Henry Page Croft	Conservative
Bow and Bromley	The Rt Hon. George Lansbury	Labour
Bradford Central	William Leach	Labour
Bradford East	Joseph Hepworth	Conservative
Bradford North	Eugene Ramsden	Conservative
Bradford South	Herbert Holdsworth	Liberal
Brecon and Radnor	Hon. Ivor Guest	National
Brentford and Chiswick	Harold Mitchell	Conservative
Bridgwater	Reginald Croom-Johnson	Conservative
Brigg	David Quibell	Labour
Brighton (two members)	Cooper Rawson	Conservative
Brighton (two members)	The Rt Hon. Sir George Tryon	Conservative
Bristol Central	Lord Apsley	Conservative
Bristol East	Sir Stafford Cripps	Labour
Bristol North	Robert Bernays	Liberal
Bristol South	Alexander Walkden	Labour
Bristol West	Cyril Thomas Culverwell	Conservative
Brixton	Nigel Colman	Conservative
Bromley	Sir Edward Campbell	Conservative
Broxtowe	Seymour Cocks	Labour
Buckingham	Sir George Bowyer, Bt	Conservative
Buckrose	Albert Braithwaite	Conservative
Burnley	Wilfrid Burke	Labour
Burslem	Andrew McLaren	Labour
Burton	The Rt Hon. John Gretton	Conservative
Bury	Alan Chorlton	Conservative
Bury St Edmunds	Frank Heilgers	Conservative
== C ==
Caerphilly	Morgan Jones	Labour
Caithness and Sutherland	The Rt Hon. Sir Archibald Sinclair, Bt	Liberal
Camberwell North	Charles Ammon	Labour
Camberwell North West	Hon. Oscar Guest	Conservative
Camborne	Peter Agnew	Conservative
Cambridge	Richard Tufnell	Conservative
Cambridgeshire	Richard Briscoe	Conservative
Cambridge University (two members)	Sir John Withers	Conservative
Cambridge University (two members)	Kenneth Pickthorn	Conservative
Cannock	William Adamson	Labour
Canterbury	Sir William Wayland	Conservative
Cardiff Central	Sir Ernest Bennett	National Labour
Cardiff East	Owen Temple-Morris	Conservative
Cardiff South	Arthur Evans	Conservative
Cardiganshire	Owen Evans	Liberal
Carlisle	Louis Spears	Conservative
Carmarthen	Daniel Hopkin	Labour
Carnarvon Boroughs	The Rt Hon. David Lloyd George	Independent Liberal
Carnarvonshire	Goronwy Owen	Independent Liberal
Chatham	Leonard Plugge	Conservative
Chelmsford	John Macnamara	Conservative
Chelsea	Rt. Hon. Sir Samuel Hoare, Bt	Conservative
Cheltenham	Sir Walter Preston	Conservative
Chertsey	Sir Archibald Boyd-Carpenter	Conservative
City of Chester	Sir Charles Cayzer, Bt	Conservative
Chesterfield	George Benson	Labour
Chester-le-Street	Jack Lawson	Labour
Chichester	John Courtauld	Conservative
Chippenham	Victor Cazalet	Conservative
Chislehurst	Sir Waldron Smithers	Conservative
Chorley	The Rt Hon. Sir Douglas Hacking	Conservative
Cirencester and Tewkesbury	William Morrison	Conservative
City of London (two members)	Sir Alan Anderson	Conservative
City of London (two members)	Sir Vansittart Bowater, Bt	Conservative
Clapham	Sir John Leigh, Bt	Conservative
Clay Cross	Alfred Holland	Labour
Cleveland	Robert Bower	Conservative
Clitheroe	Sir William Brass	Conservative
Coatbridge	James Barr	Labour
Colchester	Oswald Lewis	Conservative
Colne Valley	Ernest Marklew	Labour
Combined English Universities (two members)	Eleanor Rathbone	Independent
Combined English Universities (two members)	Sir Reginald Craddock	Conservative
Combined Scottish Universities (Three members)	John Graham Kerr	Conservative
Combined Scottish Universities (Three members)	George Morrison	Liberal National
Combined Scottish Universities (Three members)	Noel Skelton	Conservative
Cornwall North	Rt Hon. Sir Francis Dyke Acland, Bt	Liberal
Consett	David Adams	Labour
Coventry	William Strickland	Conservative
Crewe	Sir Donald Somervell	Conservative
Croydon North	Hon. Glyn Mason	Conservative
Croydon South	Herbert Williams	Conservative
Cumberland North	Wilfrid Roberts	Liberal
== D ==
Darlington	Charles Peat	Conservative
Dartford	Frank Clarke	Conservative
Darwen	Stuart Russell	Conservative
Daventry	The Rt Hon. Edward FitzRoy	Speaker (Conservative)
Denbigh	Sir Henry Morris-Jones	Liberal National
Deptford	Walter Green	Labour Co-op
Derby (two members)	Rt. Hon. J. H. Thomas	National Labour
Derby (two members)	William Allan Reid	Conservative
Derbyshire North East	Frank Lee	Labour
Derbyshire South	Paul Emrys-Evans	Conservative
Derbyshire West	The Marquess of Hartington	Conservative
Devizes	Sir Percy Hurd	Conservative
Dewsbury	Benjamin Riley	Labour
Doncaster	Alfred Short	Labour
Don Valley	Tom Williams	Labour
Dorset East	Gordon Hall Caine	Conservative
Dorset North	Sir Cecil Hanbury	Conservative
Dorset, South	Viscount Cranborne	Conservative
Dorset West	Philip Colfox	Conservative
Dover	Hon. John Astor	Conservative
Down (two members)	Sir David Reid	Ulster Unionist
Down (two members)	Viscount Castlereagh	Ulster Unionist
Dudley	Dudley Joel	Conservative
Dulwich	Bracewell Smith	Conservative
Dumbarton Burghs	David Kirkwood	Labour
Dumfriesshire	Sir Henry Fildes	Liberal National
Dunbartonshire	Hon. Archibald Cochrane	Conservative
Dundee (two members)	Dingle Foot	Liberal
Dundee (two members)	Florence Horsbrugh	Conservative
Dunfermline Burghs	William McLean Watson	Labour
Durham	Joshua Ritson	Labour
== E ==
Ealing	Sir Frank Sanderson, Bt	Conservative
Eastbourne	Charles Taylor	Conservative
East Grinstead	Sir Henry Cautley, Bt	Conservative
East Ham North	John Mayhew	Conservative
East Ham South	Alfred Barnes	Labour Co-op
Ebbw Vale	Aneurin Bevan	Labour
Eccles	Robert Cary	Conservative
Eddisbury	R. J. Russell	Liberal National
Edinburgh Central	James Guy	Conservative
Edinburgh East	Frederick Pethick-Lawrence	Labour
Edinburgh North	Alexander Erskine-Hill	Conservative
Edinburgh South	Sir Samuel Chapman	Conservative
Edinburgh West	Thomas Cooper	Conservative
Edmonton	Francis Broad	Labour Co-op
Elland	Thomas Levy	Conservative
Enfield	Bartle Bull	Conservative
Epping	The Rt Hon. Winston Churchill	Conservative
Epsom	Archibald Southby	Conservative
Essex South East	Victor Raikes	Conservative
Evesham	Rupert de la Bere	Conservative
Exeter	Arthur Reed	Conservative
Eye	Edgar Granville	Liberal National
== F ==
Fareham	The Rt Hon. Sir Thomas Inskip	Conservative
Farnham	Sir Arthur Samuel, Bt	Conservative
Farnworth	Guy Rowson	Labour
Faversham	Adam Maitland	Conservative
Fermanagh and Tyrone (two members)	Patrick Cunningham	Irish Nationalist (Abstent.)
Fermanagh and Tyrone (two members)	Anthony Mulvey	Irish Nationalist (Abstent.)
Fife East	James Henderson-Stewart	Liberal National
Fife West	Willie Gallacher	Communist
Finchley	John Crowder	Conservative
Finsbury	George Woods	Labour Co-op
Flintshire	Gwilym Rowlands	Conservative
Forest of Dean	M. Philips Price	Labour
Forfarshire	William T. Shaw	Conservative
Frome	Mavis Tate	Conservative
Fulham East	Hon. William Astor	Conservative
Fulham West	Sir Cyril Cobb	Conservative
Fylde	The Rt Hon. Edward Stanley	Conservative
== G ==
Gainsborough	Harry Crookshank	Conservative
Galloway	John Mackie	Conservative
Gateshead	Thomas Magnay	Liberal National
Gillingham	Sir Robert Gower	Conservative
Glasgow Bridgeton	James Maxton	Independent Labour Party
Glasgow Camlachie	Campbell Stephen	Independent Labour Party
Glasgow Cathcart	John Train	Conservative
Glasgow Central	Sir William Alexander	Conservative
Glasgow Gorbals	George Buchanan	Independent Labour Party
Glasgow Govan	Neil Maclean	Labour
Glasgow Hillhead	The Rt Hon. Sir Robert Horne	Conservative
Glasgow Kelvingrove	The Rt Hon. Walter Elliot	Conservative
Glasgow Maryhill	John James Davidson	Labour
Glasgow Partick	Arthur Young	Conservative
Glasgow Pollok	Rt. Hon. Sir John Gilmour, Bt	Conservative
Glasgow St. Rollox	William Leonard	Labour Co-op
Glasgow Shettleston	John McGovern	Independent Labour Party
Glasgow Springburn	George Hardie	Labour
Glasgow Tradeston	Tom Henderson	Labour Co-op
Gloucester	Leslie Boyce	Conservative
Gower	David Grenfell	Labour
Grantham	Sir Victor Warrender, Bt	Conservative
Gravesend	Sir Irving Albery	Conservative
Great Yarmouth	Arthur Harbord	Liberal National
Greenock	The Rt Hon. Sir Godfrey Collins	Liberal National
Greenwich	Sir George Hume	Conservative
Grimsby	Walter Womersley	Conservative
Guildford	Sir John Jarvis, Bt	Conservative
== H ==
Hackney Central	Fred Watkins	Labour
Hackney North	Austin Hudson	Conservative
Hackney South	The Rt Hon. Herbert Morrison	Labour
Halifax	Gilbert Gledhill	Conservative
Hamilton	Duncan Graham	Labour
Hammersmith North	D. N. Pritt	Labour
Hammersmith South	Douglas Cooke	Conservative
Hampstead	George Balfour	Conservative
Hanley	Arthur Hollins	Labour
Harborough	Ronald Tree	Conservative
Harrow	Sir Isidore Salmon	Conservative
The Hartlepools	W. G. Howard Gritten	Conservative
Harwich	Stanley Holmes	Liberal National
Hastings	The Rt Hon. Eustace Percy	Conservative
Hemel Hempstead	Rt Hon. J. C. C. Davidson	Conservative
Hemsworth	George Griffiths	Labour
Hendon	Sir Reginald Blair	Conservative
Henley	Sir Gifford Fox, Bt	Conservative
Hereford	James Thomas	Conservative
Hertford	Sir Murray Sueter	Conservative
Hexham	Douglas Clifton Brown	Conservative
Heywood and Radcliffe	Richard Porritt	Conservative
High Peak	Sir Alfred Law	Conservative
Hitchin	Sir Arnold Wilson	Conservative
Holborn	Sir Robert Tasker	Conservative
Holderness	Sir Samuel Savery	Conservative
Holland-with-Boston	Sir James Blindell	Liberal National
Honiton	Cedric Drewe	Conservative
Horncastle	Henry Haslam	Conservative
Hornsey	Euan Wallace	Conservative
Horsham and Worthing	The Earl Winterton PC	Conservative
Houghton-le-Spring	William Stewart	Labour
Howdenshire	William Carver	Conservative
Huddersfield	William Mabane	Liberal National
Huntingdonshire	Sidney Peters	Liberal National
Hythe	The Rt Hon. Sir Philip Sassoon, Bt	Conservative
== I ==
Ilford	Sir George Hamilton	Conservative
Ilkeston	George Oliver	Labour
Ince	Gordon Macdonald	Labour
Inverness	Sir Murdoch Macdonald	Liberal National
Ipswich	Sir John Ganzoni, Bt	Conservative
Isle of Ely	James de Rothschild	Liberal
Isle of Thanet	Harold Balfour	Conservative
Isle of Wight	Peter Macdonald	Conservative
Islington East	Thelma Cazalet-Keir	Conservative
Islington North	Albert Goodman	Conservative
Islington South	William Cluse	Labour
Islington West	Frederick Montague	Labour
== J ==
Jarrow	Ellen Wilkinson	Labour
== K ==
Keighley	The Rt Hon. Hastings Lees-Smith	Labour
Kennington	Sir George Harvey	Conservative
Kensington North	James Duncan	Conservative
Kensington South	Sir William Davison	Conservative
Kettering	John Eastwood	Conservative
Kidderminster	Sir John Wardlaw-Milne	Conservative
Kilmarnock	Kenneth Lindsay	National Labour
King's Lynn	Hon. Somerset Maxwell	Conservative
Kingston upon Hull Central	Walter Windsor	Labour
Kingston upon Hull East	George Muff	Labour
Kingston upon Hull North West	Sir Lambert Ward, Bt	Conservative
Kingston upon Hull South West	Richard Law	Conservative
Kingston-upon-Thames	Sir Frederick Penny, Bt	Conservative
Kingswinford	Arthur Henderson	Labour
Kinross & West Perthshire	The Duchess of Atholl	Conservative
Kirkcaldy District of Burghs	The Rt Hon. Tom Kennedy	Labour
Knutsford	Sir Ernest Makins	Conservative
== L ==
Lambeth North	George Strauss	Labour
Lanark	Alec Douglas-Home	Conservative
Lanarkshire North	William Anstruther-Gray	Conservative
Lancaster	Herwald Ramsbotham	Conservative
Leeds Central	Richard Denman	National Labour
Leeds North	Osbert Peake	Conservative
Leeds North East	Sir John Birchall	Conservative
Leeds South	Henry Charleton	Labour
Leeds South East	James Milner	Labour
Leeds West	Vyvyan Adams	Conservative
Leek	William Bromfield	Labour
Leicester East	Abraham Lyons	Conservative
Leicester South	Charles Waterhouse	Conservative
Leicester West	Hon. Harold Nicolson	National Labour
Leigh	Joe Tinker	Labour
Leith	Rt Hon. Ernest Brown	Liberal National
Leominster	Ernest Shepperson	Conservative
Lewes	Hon. John Loder	Conservative
Lewisham East	Sir Assheton Pownall	Conservative
Lewisham West	Sir Philip Dawson	Conservative
Leyton East	Sir Frederick Mills, Bt	Conservative
Leyton West	Reginald Sorensen	Labour
Lichfield	James Lovat-Fraser	National Labour
Lincoln	Walter Liddall	Conservative
Linlithgowshire	George Mathers	Labour
Liverpool East Toxteth	Patrick Buchan-Hepburn	Conservative
Liverpool Edge Hill	Alexander Critchley	Conservative
Liverpool Everton	Bertie Kirby	Labour
Liverpool Exchange	Sir John Shute	Conservative
Liverpool Fairfield	Sir Edmund Brocklebank	Conservative
Liverpool Kirkdale	Robert Rankin	Conservative
Liverpool Scotland	David Logan	Labour
Liverpool Walton	Reginald Purbrick	Conservative
Liverpool Wavertree	Peter Stapleton Shaw	Conservative
Liverpool West Derby	David Maxwell Fyfe	Conservative
Liverpool West Toxteth	Joseph Gibbins	Labour
Llandaff and Barry	Patrick Munro	Conservative
Llanelli	John Henry Williams	Labour
London University	Sir Ernest Graham-Little	National
Londonderry	Sir Ronald Ross	Ulster Unionist
Lonsdale	David Lindsay	Conservative
Loughborough	Lawrence Kimball	Conservative
Louth	Arthur Heneage	Conservative
Lowestoft	Pierse Loftus	Conservative
Ludlow	George Windsor-Clive	Conservative
Luton	Leslie Burgin	Liberal National
== M ==
Macclesfield	John Remer	Conservative
Maidstone	Alfred Bossom	Conservative
Maldon	Sir Edward Ruggles-Brise, Bt	Conservative
Manchester Ardwick	Joseph Henderson	Labour
Manchester Blackley	John Lees-Jones	Conservative
Manchester Clayton	John Jagger	Labour
Manchester Exchange	Peter Eckersley	Conservative
Manchester Gorton	Joseph Compton	Labour
Manchester Hulme	Joseph Nall	Conservative
Manchester Moss Side	William Duckworth	Conservative
Manchester Platting	Rt Hon. J. R. Clynes	Labour
Manchester Rusholme	Edmund Radford	Conservative
Manchester Withington	Edward Fleming	Conservative
Mansfield	Charles Brown	Labour
Melton	Lindsay Everard	Conservative
Merioneth	Sir Henry Haydn Jones	Liberal
Merthyr	S. O. Davies	Labour
Middlesbrough East	Alfred Edwards	Labour
Middlesbrough West	Frank Kingsley Griffith	Liberal
Middleton and Prestwich	Sir Nairne Stewart Sandeman, Bt	Conservative
Midlothian North	John Colville	Conservative
Midlothian South and Peebles	Archibald Maule Ramsay	Conservative
Mitcham	Sir Richard Meller	Conservative
Monmouth	John Herbert	Conservative
Montgomeryshire	Clement Davies	Liberal National
Montrose	Charles Kerr	Liberal National
Moray & Nairn	Hon. James Stuart	Conservative
Morpeth	Robert Taylor	Labour
Mossley	Austin Hopkinson	National
Motherwell	James Walker	Labour
== N ==
Neath	Sir William Jenkins	Labour
Nelson and Colne	Sydney Silverman	Labour
Newark	The Marquess of Titchfield	Conservative
Newbury	Howard Clifton Brown	Conservative
Newcastle-under-Lyme	Rt Hon. Josiah Wedgwood	Labour
Newcastle-upon-Tyne Central	Alfred Denville	Conservative
Newcastle-upon-Tyne East	Sir Robert Aske, Bt	Liberal National
Newcastle-upon-Tyne North	Sir Nicholas Grattan-Doyle	Conservative
Newcastle-upon-Tyne West	Sir Joseph Leech	Conservative
New Forest and Christchurch	John Mills	Conservative
Newport	Sir Reginald Clarry	Conservative
Newton	Sir Robert Young	Labour
Norfolk East	Viscount Elmley	Liberal National
Norfolk North	Sir Thomas Cook	Conservative
Norfolk South	James Christie	Conservative
Norfolk South West	Somerset de Chair	Conservative
Normanton	Tom Smith	Labour
Northampton	Sir Mervyn Manningham-Buller, Bt	Conservative
Northwich	Lord Colum Crichton-Stuart	Conservative
Norwich (two members)	Geoffrey Shakespeare	Liberal National
Norwich (two members)	Henry Strauss	Conservative
Norwood	Duncan Sandys	Conservative
Nottingham Central	Sir Terence O'Connor	Conservative
Nottingham East	Louis Gluckstein	Conservative
Nottingham South	Frank Markham	National Labour
Nottingham West	Arthur Hayday	Labour
Nuneaton	Reginald Fletcher	Labour
== O ==
Ogmore	Edward Williams	Labour
Oldham (two members)	John Dodd	Liberal National
Oldham (two members)	Hamilton Kerr	Conservative
Orkney and Shetland	Basil Neven-Spence	Conservative
Ormskirk	Samuel Rosbotham	National Labour
Oswestry	Bertie Leighton	Conservative
Oxford	Rt Hon. Robert Bourne	Conservative
Oxford University (two members)	A. P. Herbert	Independent
Oxford University (two members)	Rt Hon. Lord Hugh Cecil	Conservative
== P ==
Paddington North	Brendan Bracken	Conservative
Paddington South	Ernest Taylor	Conservative
Paisley	Hon. Joseph Maclay	Liberal
Peckham	Viscount Borodale	Conservative
Pembrokeshire	Gwilym Lloyd George	Independent Liberal
Penistone	Henry McGhee	Labour
Penrith and Cockermouth	Alan Gandar-Dower	Conservative
Penryn and Falmouth	Maurice Petherick	Conservative
Perth	Thomas Hunter	Conservative
Peterborough	Lord Burghley	Conservative
Petersfield	Sir Reginald Dorman-Smith	Conservative
Plymouth Devonport	Rt Hon. Leslie Hore-Belisha	Liberal National
Plymouth Drake	Rt Hon. Frederick Guest	Conservative
Plymouth Sutton	Nancy Astor	Conservative
Pontefract	Adam Hills	Labour
Pontypool	Arthur Jenkins	Labour
Pontypridd	David Lewis Davies	Labour
Poplar South	David Morgan Adams	Labour
Portsmouth Central	Hon. Ralph Beaumont	Conservative
Portsmouth North	Sir Roger Keyes, Bt	Conservative
Portsmouth South	Sir Herbert Cayzer, Bt	Conservative
Preston (two members)	William Kirkpatrick	Conservative
Preston (two members)	Adrian Moreing	Conservative
Pudsey and Otley	Sir Granville Gibson	Conservative
Putney	Marcus Samuel	Conservative
== Q ==
Queen's University of Belfast	Thomas Sinclair	Ulster Unionist
== R ==
Reading	Alfred Howitt	Conservative
Reigate	Gordon Touche	Conservative
Renfrewshire, East	Douglas Douglas-Hamilton	Conservative
Renfrewshire, West	Henry Scrymgeour-Wedderburn	Conservative
Rhondda East	William Mainwaring	Labour
Rhondda West	William John	Labour
Richmond (Yorks)	Thomas Dugdale	Conservative
Richmond upon Thames	William Ray	Conservative
Ripon	John Hills	Conservative
Rochdale	William Kelly	Labour
Romford	John Parker	Labour
Ross and Cromarty	The Rt Hon. Sir Ian Macpherson, Bt	Liberal National
Rossendale	Ronald Cross	Conservative
Rotherham	William Dobbie	Labour
Rotherhithe	Ben Smith	Labour
Rother Valley	Edward Dunn	Labour
Rothwell	William Lunn	Labour
Roxburgh and Selkirk	Lord William Montagu-Douglas-Scott	Conservative
Royton	Harold Sutcliffe	Conservative
Rugby	Rt Hon. David Margesson	Conservative
Rushcliffe	Ralph Assheton	Conservative
Rutherglen	Allan Chapman	Conservative
Rutland and Stamford	Lord Willoughby de Eresby	Conservative
Rye	Sir George Courthope, Bt	Conservative
== S ==
Saffron Walden	Rab Butler	Conservative
St Albans	Sir Francis Fremantle	Conservative
St Helens	William Albert Robinson	Labour
St Ives	Rt Hon. Walter Runciman	Liberal National
St Marylebone	Alec Cunningham-Reid	Conservative
St Pancras North	Ian Fraser	Conservative
St Pancras South East	Sir Alfred Beit, Bt	Conservative
St Pancras South West	Sir George Mitcheson	Conservative
Salford North	John Patrick Morris	Conservative
Salford South	Hon. John Stourton	Conservative
Salford West	James Frederick Emery	Conservative
Salisbury	James Despencer-Robertson	Conservative
Scarborough and Whitby	Sir Paul Latham, Bt	Conservative
Seaham	Manny Shinwell	Labour
Sedgefield	John Leslie	Labour
Sevenoaks	Charles Ponsonby	Conservative
Sheffield, Attercliffe	Cecil Wilson	Labour
Sheffield, Brightside	Fred Marshall	Labour
Sheffield, Central	William Boulton	Conservative
Sheffield, Ecclesall	Sir Robert Ellis, Bt	Conservative
Sheffield, Hallam	Sir Louis Smith	Conservative
Sheffield, Hillsborough	Rt Hon. A. V. Alexander	Labour Co-op
Sheffield, Park	George Lathan	Labour
Shipley	Arthur Creech Jones	Labour
Shoreditch	Ernest Thurtle	Labour
Shrewsbury	Arthur Duckworth	Conservative
Skipton	George Rickards	Conservative
Smethwick	Roy Wise	Conservative
Southampton (two members)	William Craven-Ellis	Conservative
Southampton (two members)	Sir Charles Barrie	Liberal National
Southend-on-Sea	Henry Channon	Conservative
South Molton	Rt Hon. George Lambert	Liberal National
Southport	Robert Hudson	Conservative
South Shields	James Chuter Ede	Labour
Southwark Central	Harry Day	Labour
Southwark North	Edward Strauss	Liberal National
Southwark South East	Thomas Naylor	Labour
Sowerby	Malcolm McCorquodale	Conservative
Spelthorne	Sir Reginald Blaker, Bt	Conservative
Spennymoor	Joseph Batey	Labour
Spen Valley	Rt. Hon. Sir John Simon	Liberal National
Stafford	Rt Hon. William Ormsby-Gore	Conservative
Stalybridge and Hyde	Philip Dunne	Conservative
Stepney Limehouse	Rt. Hon. Clement Attlee	Labour
Stepney Mile End	Daniel Frankel	Labour
Stirling and Falkirk	Joseph Westwood	Labour
Stirlingshire East and Clackmannan	MacNeill Weir	Labour
Stirlingshire West	Rt Hon. Tom Johnston	Labour
Stockport (two members)	Sir Arnold Gridley	Conservative
Stockport (two members)	Norman Hulbert	Conservative
Stockton on Tees	Harold Macmillan	Conservative
Stoke Newington	Sir George Jones	Conservative
Stoke-on-Trent	Ellis Smith	Labour
Stone	Joseph Lamb	Conservative
Stourbridge	Robert Morgan	Conservative
Streatham	Sir William Lane-Mitchell	Conservative
Stretford	Anthony Crossley	Conservative
Stroud	Walter Perkins	Conservative
Sudbury	The Rt Hon. Henry Burton	Conservative
Sunderland (two members)	Stephen Furness	Liberal National
Sunderland (two members)	Samuel Storey	Conservative
Surrey East	Charles Emmott	Conservative
Swansea East	David Williams	Labour
Swansea West	Lewis Jones	Liberal National
Swindon	Wavell Wakefield	Conservative
== T ==
Tamworth	Sir John Mellor, Bt	Conservative
Taunton	Edward Wickham	Conservative
Tavistock	Colin Patrick	Conservative
Thirsk and Malton	Robin Turton	Conservative
Thornbury	Derrick Gunston	Conservative
Tiverton	Gilbert Acland-Troyte	Conservative
Tonbridge	Rt Hon. Herbert Spender-Clay	Conservative
Torquay	Charles Williams	Conservative
Totnes	Ralph Rayner	Conservative
Tottenham North	Robert Morrison	Labour Co-op
Tottenham South	Fred Messer	Labour
Twickenham	Edward Keeling	Conservative
Tynemouth	Sir Alexander Russell	Conservative
== U ==
University of Wales	Ernest Evans	Liberal
Uxbridge	John Llewellin	Conservative
== W ==
Wakefield	Rt. Hon. Arthur Greenwood	Labour
Wallasey	John Moore-Brabazon	Conservative
Wallsend	Irene Ward	Conservative
Walsall	Joseph Leckie	Liberal National
Walthamstow East	Sir Brograve Beauchamp, Bt	Conservative
Walthamstow West	Valentine McEntee	Labour
Wandsworth Central	Sir Henry Jackson, Bt	Conservative
Wansbeck	Bernard Cruddas	Conservative
Warrington	Noel Goldie	Conservative
Warwick and Leamington	Rt Hon. Anthony Eden	Conservative
Waterloo	Malcolm Bullock	Conservative
Watford	Rt Hon. Sir Dennis Herbert	Conservative
Wednesbury	John Banfield	Labour
Wellingborough	Archibald James	Conservative
Wells	Anthony Muirhead	Conservative
Wentworth	Wilfred Paling	Labour
West Bromwich	Rt Hon. Frederick Roberts	Labour
Westbury	Robert Grimston	Conservative
Western Isles	Malcolm Macmillan	Labour
West Ham Plaistow	Will Thorne	Labour
West Ham Silvertown	Jack Jones	Labour
West Ham Stratford	Thomas Groves	Labour
West Ham Upton	Benjamin Gardner	Labour
Westhoughton	Rhys Davies	Labour
Westminster Abbey	Sidney Herbert	Conservative
Westminster St George's	Duff Cooper	Conservative
Westmorland	Rt Hon. Oliver Stanley	Conservative
Weston-super-Mare	Ian Orr-Ewing	Conservative
Whitechapel & St Georges	J. H. Hall	Labour
Whitehaven	Frank Anderson	Labour
Widnes	Richard Pilkington	Conservative
Wigan	John Parkinson	Labour
Willesden East	Daniel Somerville	Conservative
Willesden West	Samuel Viant	Labour
Wimbledon	Sir John Power, Bt	Conservative
Winchester	Gerald Palmer	Conservative
Windsor	Annesley Somerville	Conservative
Wirral	Alan Graham	Conservative
Wolverhampton Bilston	Ian Hannah	Conservative
Wolverhampton East	Geoffrey Mander	Liberal
Wolverhampton West	Sir Robert Bird, Bt	Conservative
Woodbridge	Walter Ross-Taylor	Conservative
Wood Green	Beverley Baxter	Conservative
Woolwich East	George Hicks	Labour
Woolwich West	Rt Hon. Sir Kingsley Wood	Conservative
Worcester	Crawford Greene	Conservative
Workington	Tom Cape	Labour
The Wrekin	James Baldwin-Webb	Conservative
Wrexham	Robert Richards	Labour
Wycombe	Sir Alfred Knox	Conservative
== Y ==
Yeovil	George Davies	Conservative
York	Roger Lumley	Conservative

== By-elections ==
See the list of United Kingdom by-elections.

== See also ==
- UK general election, 1935
- List of MPs for constituencies in Wales (1935–1945)
- List of parliaments of the United Kingdom
