= Robert Jones =

Rob(ert), Bob, or Bobby Jones may refer to:

== Academics ==
- Bob Jones Sr. (1883–1968), Christian evangelist who founded Bob Jones University
- Bob Jones Jr. (1911–1997), Bob Jones, Sr.'s son, and second president of Bob Jones University
- Bob Jones III (born 1939), Bob Jones, Sr.'s grandson, and third president of Bob Jones University
- Bobby Jones (academic) (1932–2001), American academic
- Bobi Jones (Robert Maynard Jones, 1929–2017), Welsh Christian academic
- Robert B. Jones (linguist) (1920–2007), professor at Cornell University
- Robert J. Jones (born 1951), president of the University of Washington

== Arts and entertainment ==
=== Films and plays ===
- Bob Jones (sound engineer), British sound engineer for films
- Bob Devin Jones (born 1954), American playwright, director, and actor
- Rob Brydon (Robert Brydon Jones, born 1965), Welsh actor
- Robert Edmond Jones (1887–1954), American theater designer of sets, lighting, costumes
- Robert Earl Jones (1910–2006), American actor and father of James Earl Jones
- Robert C. Jones (1936–2021), American screenwriter and film editor
- Robbie Jones (actor) (Robert Lee Jones III, born 1977), American actor

=== Music ===
- Bobby Jones (saxophonist) (1928–1980), American jazz saxophonist
- Bobby Jones (singer) (born 1939), gospel singer
- Rob Jones (musician) (1964–1993), bass guitarist in the British band The Wonder Stuff
- Robert Hope-Jones (1859–1914), English inventor of the theater organ
- Robert Jones (English composer) (died 1617), English lutenist and composer
- Robert Jones (Welsh composer) (born 1945), Welsh composer, organist and choirmaster
- Robert W. Jones (1932–1997), American classical composer

=== Writers and illustrators ===
- Bob Jones, writer of the syndicated Goren Bridge newspaper column
- Bob Jones (illustrator) (1926–2018), American artist and advertising illustrator
- Robert Jones, name given by adoptive parents to Australian writer Robert Dessaix
- Robert F. Jones (1934–2002), American novelist and outdoors journalist
- R.S. Jones (Robert S. Jones, 1954–2001), American novelist and editor
- Robert Isaac Jones (1813–1905), Welsh pharmacist, writer, and printer
- Robert Jones Jr., American author

== Politics ==
=== Australia and Canada ===
- Robert Jones (Australian politician) (1845–1927), New South Wales politician
- Robert Jones (Lower Canada politician) (died 1844), land agent and politician in Lower Canada
- Robert Jones (Canada East politician) (died 1874), politician in Canada East

=== UK ===
- Robert Jones (diplomat) (died 1574), Clerk of the Privy Seal
- Robert Jones (of Castell-March), MP for Carnarvon in 1625 and Flintshire in 1628
- Robert Jones (died 1715) (1682–1715), British MP for Glamorganshire, 1712–1715
- Robert Jones (died 1774) (1704–1774), British MP for Huntingdon, 1754–1774
- Robert Jones (Labour politician) (1874–1940), British MP for Caernarvonshire, 1922–1923
- Robert Jones (Conservative politician) (1950–2007), British Conservative MP 1983–1997

=== US ===
- Robert McDonald Jones (1808–1872), Confederate politician
- Robert Taylor Jones (1884–1958), governor of Arizona
- Robert Franklin Jones (1907–1968), Ohio representative to US Congress, 1939–1947
- Robert E. Jones Jr. (1912–1997), US representative from Alabama
- Robert G. Jones (born 1939), Louisiana state senator
- Robert Jones (Michigan politician) (1944–2010), Kalamazoo mayor, member of Michigan House of Representatives

== Sports ==
=== American football ===
- Bob Jones (long snapper) (born 1978), for the New York Giants
- Bob Jones (wide receiver) (born 1945), for the Chicago Bears
- Bob Jones (defensive back) (1951–2023), defensive back for the Cincinnati Bengals and Atlanta Falcons
- Bobby Jones (guard) (1912–1999), for the Green Bay Packers
- Bobby Jones (wide receiver) (born 1955)
- Robert Jones (linebacker) (born 1969), for the Dallas Cowboys
- Robert Jones (offensive lineman) (born 1999), for the Miami Dolphins
- Robbie Jones (American football) (Robert Washington Jones, born 1959), linebacker for the New York Giants

=== Association football ===
- Robert Albert Jones (1864–?), Druids F.C. and Wales international footballer
- Robert Jones (footballer, born 1868) (1868–1939), Everton, Ardwick and Wales international footballer
- Robert Jones (footballer, born 1971), English football midfielder for Wrexham
- Robert Jones (referee) (born 1987), English football referee
- Robert Reuben Jones (1902–?), footballer for Huddersfield Town, 1920s
- Bob Jones (footballer, born 1902) (1902–1989), football goalkeeper for Bolton Wanderers and Cardiff City, 1920s and 1930s
- Bobby Jones (footballer, born 1933) (1933–1998), footballer for Southport, Chester, and Blackburn
- Bobby Jones (footballer, born 1938) (1938–2015), footballer for Bristol Rovers, Northampton Town, and Swindon Town
- Rob Jones (footballer, born 1971), Welsh-born English international footballer, played for Liverpool in the 1990s
- Rob Jones (footballer, born 1979), English footballer for Doncaster Rovers

=== Baseball ===
- Bobby Jones (right-handed pitcher) (born 1970), right-handed baseball pitcher
- Bobby Jones (left-handed pitcher) (born 1972), left-handed baseball pitcher
- Bobby Jones (outfielder) (born 1949), outfielder and manager/coach
- Bob Jones (third baseman) (1889–1964), Major League Baseball player
- Sug Jones (Robert Roosevelt Jones, 1907–1982), American baseball player

=== Basketball ===
- Bob Jones (basketball, born 1940) (1940–2021), American basketball coach and athletic director at Kentucky Wesleyan College, 1972–1980
- Bobby Jones (basketball, born 1951), American professional basketball player in the 1970s and 80s, member of Basketball Hall of Fame
- Bobby Jones (basketball, born 1962), American basketball coach at Saint Francis University, high school athletic director
- Bobby Jones (basketball, born 1984), American professional basketball player
- Robert Jones (basketball, born 1979), American basketball coach at Norfolk State University

=== Cricket ===
- Rob Jones (cricketer) (born 1995), English cricketer
- Robert Jones (English cricketer) (born 1981)
- Robert Jones (Barbadian cricketer) (1886–1951)

=== Golf ===
- Bobby Jones (golfer) (1902–1971), American amateur golfer
- Robert Trent Jones (1906–2000), golf course architect
- Robert Trent Jones Jr. (born 1939), golf course architect

=== Rugby ===
- Bob Jones (rugby union) (1875–1944), Welsh rugby union forward
- Bobby Jones (rugby union) (1900–1970), Welsh rugby player
- Robert Jones (rugby, born 1921) (1921–?), rugby union and league footballer for Wales XV (RU), Glamorgan, Aberavon
- Robert Jones (rugby union, born 1965), Wales and British Lions rugby union player

=== Other sports ===
- Bob Jones (Australian footballer) (born 1961), Australian rules footballer
- Robert Jones (ice hockey) (1867–?), goaltender for the Montreal Victorias
- Bob Jones (ice hockey) (1945–2026), played in the NHL and WHA
- Rob Jones (racing driver) (born 1972), American stock car racing driver
- Rob Jones (rower), (born 1985), US rower and 2012 Paralympic Games medalist
- Robert Jones (jockey) (died 1938), aka Bobby Jones, American Champion jockey
- Robert Jones (discus thrower) (born 1908), American discus thrower and winner of the 1934 USA Outdoor Track and Field Championships

== Business ==
- Bob Jones (businessman) (1939–2025), New Zealand property investor, author and politician
- Bob Jones (Texas businessman), former Texas businessman
- Robert "Fish" Jones (died 1930), American fish market owner, zoo owner

== Law ==
- Robert Noble Jones (1864–1942), New Zealand lawyer, public servant and land court judge
- Robert E. Jones (judge) (1927–2025), Oregon Supreme Court and federal district judge
- Robert Byron Jones (1833–1867), justice of the Louisiana Supreme Court
- Robert Clive Jones (born 1947), American federal judge
- Bob Jones (police commissioner) (1955–2014), in the West Midlands of England
- Robert Jones (wrongful conviction) (born 1973), exonerated after conviction for a 1992 murder
- Robert Jones (Ohio lawyer) (1930–1998)
- Arthur R. Jones (born 1969) (known professionally as "Rob"), US district judge

== Military ==
- Robert Jones (figure skater), 18th-century British popularizer of figure skating and fireworks
- Robert Jones (VC) (1857–1898), Welsh recipient of the Victoria Cross
- Robert Jephson Jones (1905–1985), British bomb disposal expert awarded the George Cross
- Robert Owen Jones (1837–1926), British Army officer and cartographer

== Religion ==
- Robert Elijah Jones (1872–1960), American clergyman, bishop of the Methodist Episcopalian Church
- Robert Jones (archdeacon of Worcester) (born 1955), English Anglican priest
- Robert Jones (dean of Clonmacnoise) (born 1955)
- Robert Jones (writer) (1810–1879), Welsh Anglican priest and writer
- Bob Jones (bishop) (1932–2026), American prelate of the Episcopal Church

== Science ==
- Sir Robert Jones, 1st Baronet (1857–1933), British orthopaedic surgeon
- Robert Thomas Jones (engineer) (1910–1999), NASA aeronautical engineer
- Robert Clark Jones (1916–2004), American physicist
- Robert Jones (aerodynamicist) (1891–1962), Welsh aerodynamicist

== Other ==
- Robert Jones (designer), British cabinet maker and designer
- Robert J. Jones (trade unionist) (1899–1962), Welsh trade union leader
- Robert Lawton Jones (1925–2018), American architect from Oklahoma, noted for his contributions to modern art
- Bob Jones (Grand Dragon) (1930–1989), Ku Klux Klan official in the 1960s
- Bob Jones Award, an award given by the United States Golf Association
- Bob Jones High School, Madison, the largest public high school in the state of Alabama
- Bob Jones University, founded by Bob Jones, Sr
- Bob Jones University v. United States, a US Supreme Court decision

== See also ==
- Robert Johns (disambiguation)
- Bert Jones (disambiguation)
