= Robert Thomas Jones =

Robert Thomas Jones may refer to:

- Robert Jones (Labour politician) (1874–1940), Welsh quarryman, trade unionist and politician
- Robert Thomas Jones (engineer) (1910–1999), aerodynamicist and aeronautical engineer
