= 1880 Caernarvonshire by-election =

UK parliamentary by-election in Wales

The 1880 Caernarvonshire by-election was a parliamentary by-election held for the UK House of Commons constituency of Caernarvonshire in Wales on 2 December 1880.

== Vacancy ==
The by-election was caused by the resignation of the sitting Liberal MP, Watkin Williams, who was appointed as a judge of the Queen's Bench Division of the High Court of Justice.

== Candidates ==
Two candidates were nominated by the two main parties of the time.

The Liberal Party nominated businessman William Rathbone.

The Conservative Party nominated Welsh landowner and magistrate Hugh Ellis-Nanney.

== Result ==
1880 Caernarvonshire by-election
Party	Candidate	Votes	%	±%
Liberal	William Rathbone	3,180	59.7	−0.3
Conservative	Hugh Ellis-Nanney	2,151	40.3	+0.3
Majority		1,029	19.4	−0.6
Turnout		5,331	80.1	−2.7
Registered electors		6,652		
Liberal hold		Swing	-0.3	
