= Charles Breese =

Charles Breese may refer to:

- Charles Breese (RAF officer) (1889–1941), British Royal Navy and Royal Air Force officer
- Charles Breese (politician) (1867–1932), Welsh solicitor, antiquarian and Liberal politician
