= Goronwy Owen =

Goronwy Owen may refer to:

- Goronwy Owen (poet) (1723–1769), poet of the 18th century Welsh literary renaissance
- Goronwy Owen (politician) (1881–1963), Welsh Liberal MP
