= Bobby Jones Jr. =

Bobby Jones Jr. may refer to:

- Bobby Jones (golfer) (1902–1971), American lawyer and amateur golfer
- Bobby Jones (basketball, born 1984) (born 1984), American professional basketball player
- Robert Trent Jones Jr. (born 1939), golf course architect

== See also ==
- Bobby Jones (disambiguation)
