= George Douglas-Pennant, 2nd Baron Penrhyn =

British peer and landowner (1836–1907)

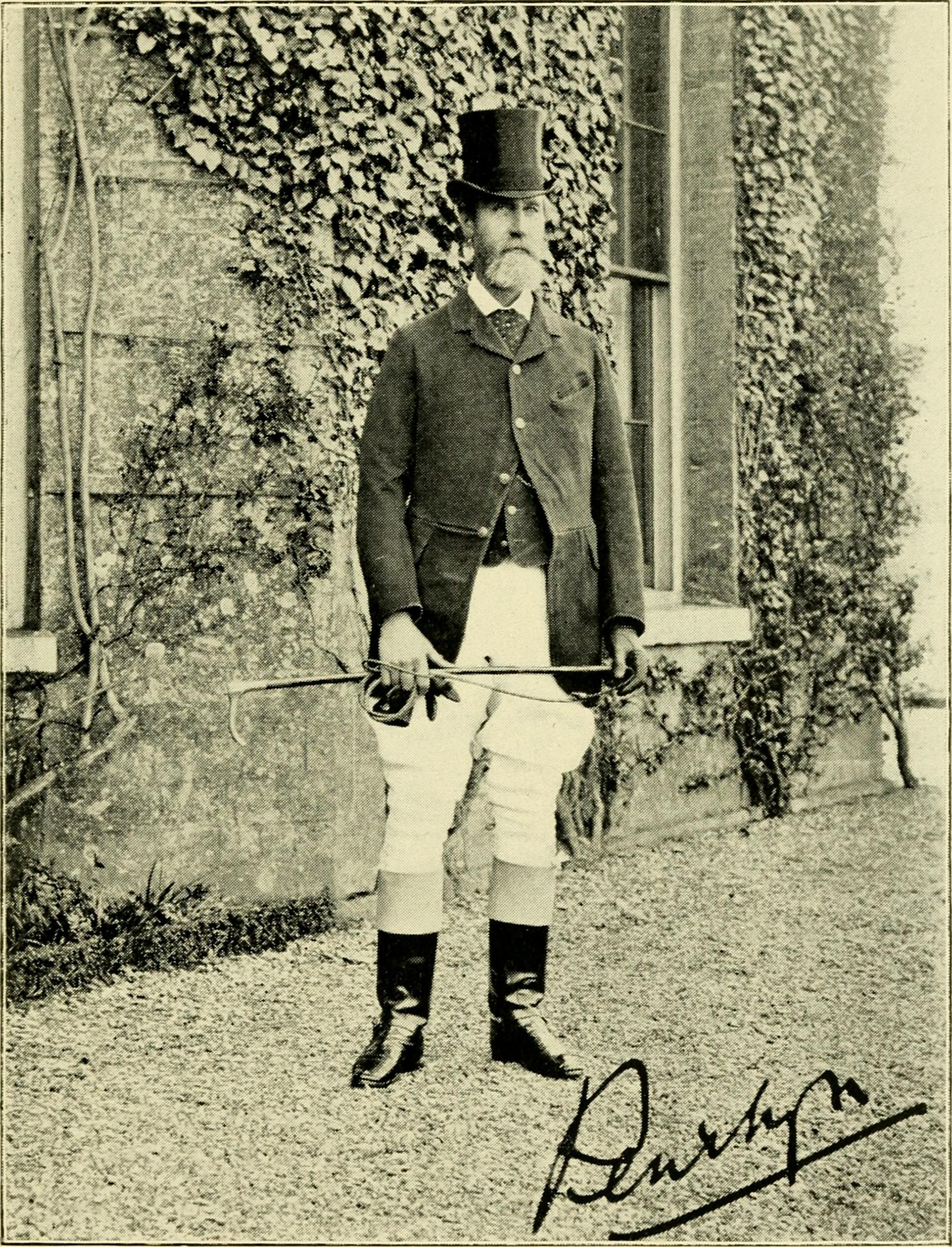
Lord Penrhyn

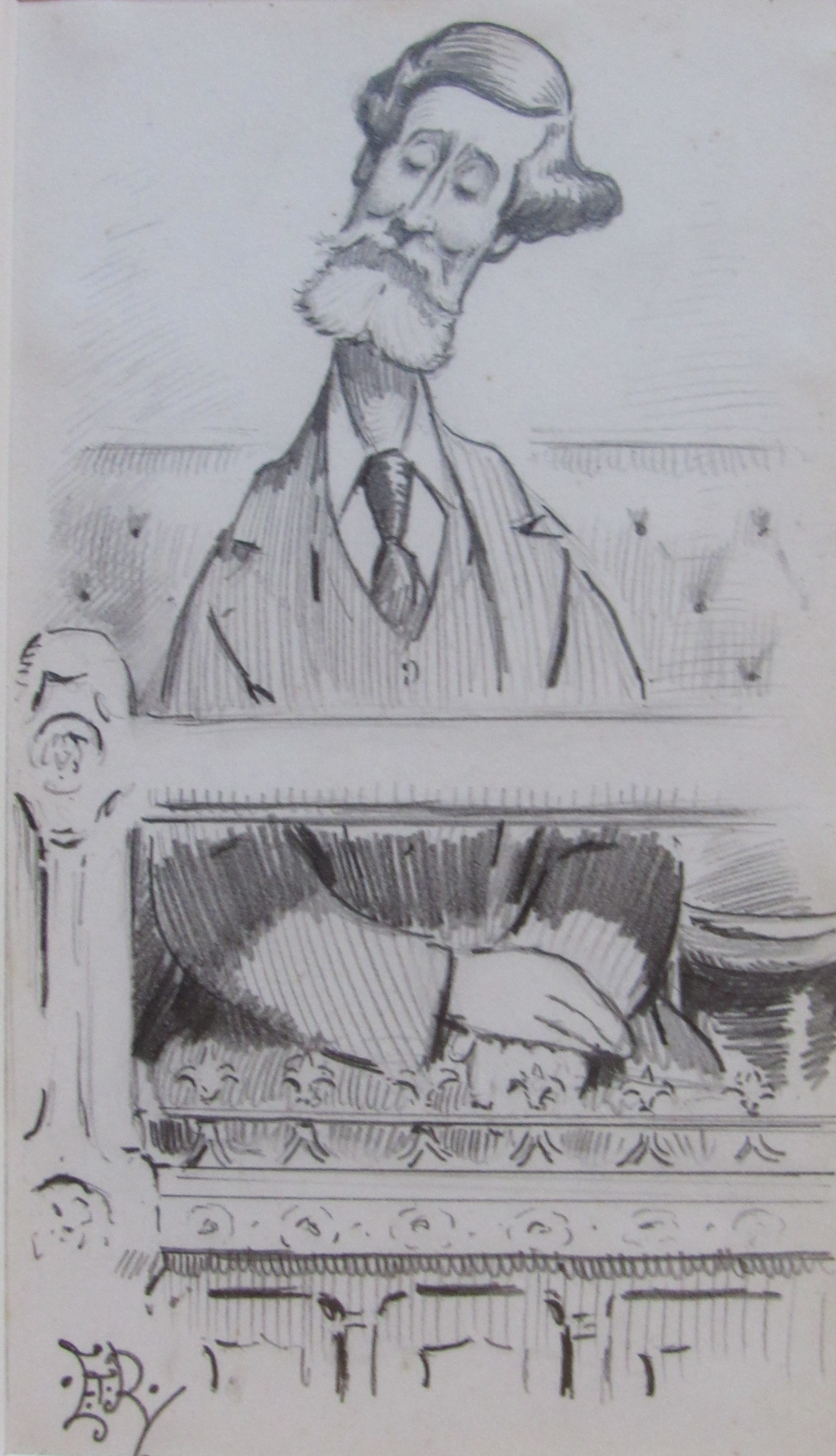
Lord Penrhyn illustrated in Punch (6 May 1903) by Edward Tennyson Reed

George Sholto Gordon Douglas-Pennant, 2nd Baron Penrhyn (born Douglas; 30 September 1836 – 10 March 1907) was a British peer and landowner who played a prominent part in the Welsh slate industry as the owner of the Penrhyn Quarry in North Wales. Penrhyn, an opponent of trade unions who engaged in frequent disputes with his employees, was called "the best hated employer in Britain".

== Early life and education ==
Penrhyn was born in 1836 at Linton Spring Hall, in Wetherby, Yorkshire. He was the elder son of Scottish father Edward Gordon Douglas (1800–1886), third son of The Hon. John Douglas, who was the second son of James Douglas, 14th Earl of Morton. His mother, his father's first wife, was Juliana Isabella Mary Dawkins-Pennant (died 1842), who inherited considerable land in North Wales as the eldest daughter and co-heiress of George Hay Dawkins-Pennant of Penrhyn Castle. In 1841, his father assumed the additional surname of Pennant by royal licence. His father was raised to the peerage as Baron Penrhyn on 3 August 1866.

George was educated at Eton and Christ Church, Oxford.

== Career ==
A plan to enter the army was abandoned in deference to his father's wishes, but he was always interested in military affairs. He was commissioned on 1 March 1860 as captain-commandant of the 1st (Carnarvon) Carnarvonshire Rifle Volunteer Corps, which was largely recruited from his family's Penrhyn Slate Quarry. A second unit was soon raised from Pennant employees and he was promoted to major in command of the 1st Administrative Battalion of Carnarvonshire Rifle Volunteers. He was later made Honorary Colonel of the 4th (Royal Carnarvon and Merioneth Militia) Battalion, Royal Welsh Fusiliers, a position that his father had also held.

In 1866 he was elected Conservative Member of Parliament for Caernarvonshire, and held the seat until he was defeated in 1868. Following this defeat his father sacked 80 quarrymen for failing to vote for him. He was re-elected in 1874, but was defeated in 1880 by Watkin Williams, Q.C.

He succeeded to the peerage on his father's death in 1886. After that he devoted most of his time and energy to the management of the 26,278-acre (110 km^{2}) Penrhyn Estate, which had a rent-roll of £67,000, and the slate quarry at Bethesda which at its peak was estimated to produce £150,000 (about equivalent to £16,700,000 in 2025) a year.

In his later years his father had passed the management of the quarry to an elected committee of the men. In 1885 the quarry was on the verge of bankruptcy and George was entrusted with full power to reform the administration. One of his first actions was to repudiate the authority of the workmen's committee. Under fresh and strenuous management the quarry once again became busy and prosperous.

A strike began in 1897, and Lord Penrhyn closed the quarry. An angry debate took place in the House of Commons but Lord Penrhyn would abate none of his conditions, and the men capitulated.

As an opponent of trade unionism, Lord Penrhyn refused to allow the intervention of outsiders in dealings with his men, and late in 1900 a second general strike began, known as the Great Strike; the quarry was again closed. It re-opened after a prolonged stoppage using 600 of the former workmen who broke the strike. Penrhyn refused to re-engage the ringleaders or to recognise any trade union officials. On 9 August 1901, Robert Thomas Jones, raised an urgent discussion on the conduct of the local magistrates in requisitioning cavalry for maintaining peace in the district, but Penrhyn's position was unaffected. On 13 March 1903, he brought an action for libel against William John Parry, in respect of an article in the Clarion, accusing him of cruelty to his workmen; he received £500 damages and costs. Penrhyn acted throughout in accordance with what he believed to be stern equity and from a wish to obtain justice for non-union men. In 1907, he gave his workmen a bonus of 10 per cent, owing to bad weather which had interrupted work at the quarries.

Fond of horse-racing and breeding, he was elected to the Jockey Club in 1887, but was not very fortunate on the turf. In 1898, however, he won the Goodwood Cup with King's Messenger, which also won the Great Metropolitan Handicap at Epsom in 1899 and 1900. In 1894 his horse Quaesitum won both the Chester Cup and the Queen's Vase. He was an excellent shot, but derived his chief enjoyment from fishing, in which he was exceptionally skilled. He was master of the Grafton hounds from 1882 to 1891.

Lord Penrhyn was a deputy-lieutenant for Carnarvonshire and was a county councillor for the Llandegai division of the county.

He died on 10 March 1907 aged 70 at his town residence, Mortimer House, Halkin Street, London SW1, and was buried near one of his country residences, Wicken, Stony Stratford.

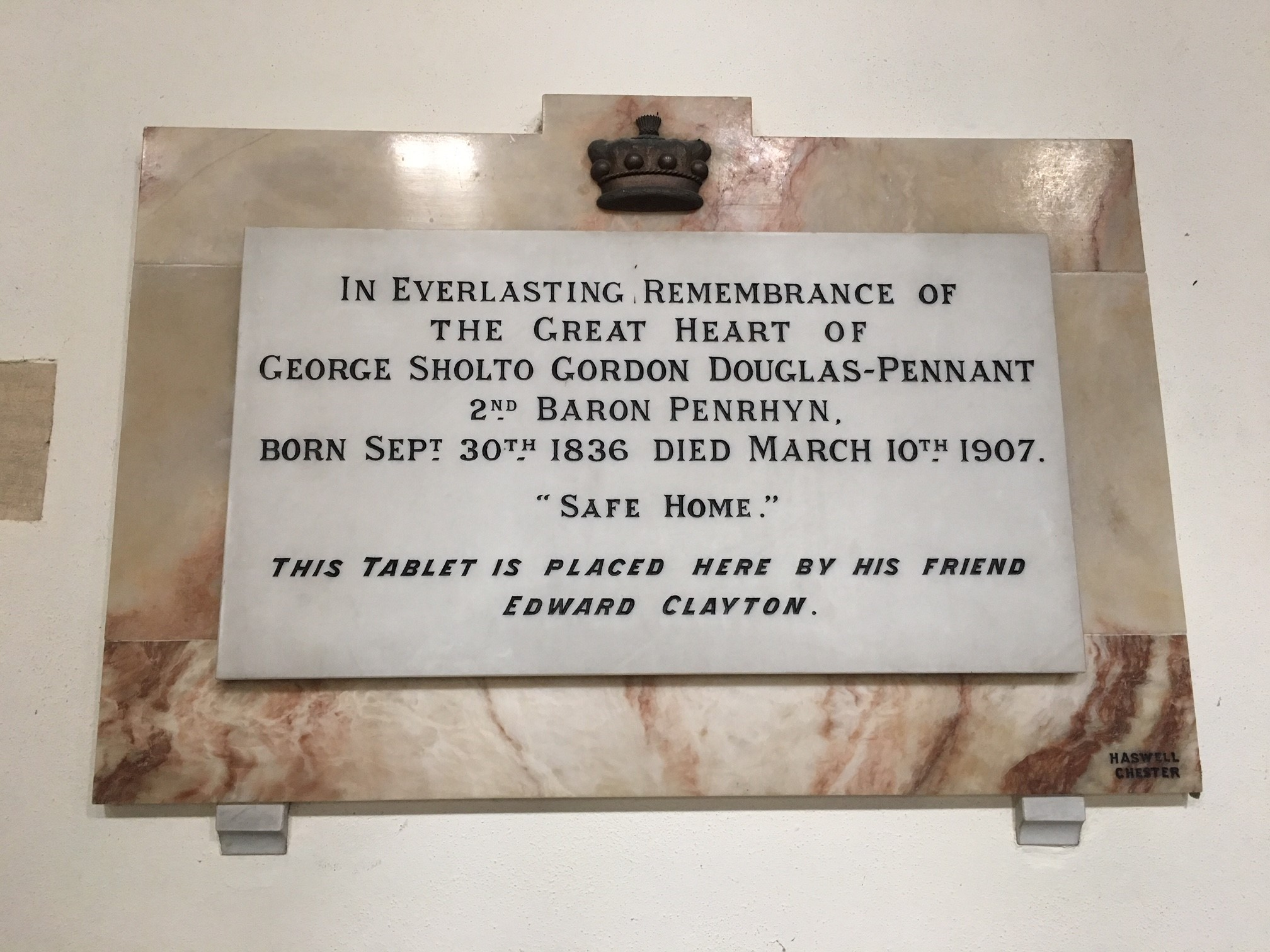
Memorial to George Douglas-Pennant, 2nd Baron Penrhyn, in the church of St Peter & St Paul, Exton, Rutland

== Marriages and issue ==
Lord Penryhn was married twice and had 15 children. On 23 August 1860, he married Pamela Blanche Rushout (1839–1869), daughter of Sir Charles Rushout Rushout, 2nd Baronet, with whom he had one son and six daughters:

- Hon. Kathleen (2 June 1861 – 29 December 1953), married in 1886 Evelyn Boscawen, 7th Viscount Falmouth
- Hon. Alice (23 June 1862 – 16 March 1939), died unmarried
- Hon. Pamela Georgina MBE (28 May 1863 – 20 July 1949), married in 1883 Col. Hon. Henry Lloyd-Mostyn, son of Thomas Lloyd-Mostyn
- Hon. Edward Sholto (1864–1927), married in 1887 the Hon. Blanche Fitzroy, daughter of Charles FitzRoy, 3rd Baron Southampton and Ismania FitzRoy, Baroness Southampton; succeeded as 3rd Baron Penrhyn
- Hon. Hilda (24 December 1865 – 11 February 1959), died unmarried
- Hon. Ina OBE (5 December 1867 – 13 July 1942), married in 1902 Maj.-Gen. Arthur Sandbach
- Cdt. Hon. Violet Blanche (1869–1945), commandant of the Women's Royal Air Force

His wife, Pamela, died of complications of childbirth on 5 February 1869, days after the birth of their youngest daughter, Violet.

On 21 October 1875, he married Gertrude Jessy Glynne (16 September 1850 – 1940), daughter of the Rev. Henry Glynne and great-niece of the Liberal Prime Minister William Ewart Gladstone. With his second wife, he had two sons, who were both killed in action in the First World War; and six daughters:

- Lt. Hon. George Henry (26 August 1876 – 11 March 1915), the King's Company, 1st Battalion, Grenadier Guards, killed in action
- Lt. Hon. Charles (7 October 1877 – 29 October 1914), 1st Battalion, Coldstream Guards, killed in action; married in 1905 Lady Edith Anne, daughter of Vesey Dawson, 2nd Earl of Dartrey
- Hon. Gwynedd (24 September 1879 – 14 October 1960), married 1899 Sir Cuthbert Quilter, 2nd Baronet
- Hon. Lilian (9 February 1881 – 23 May 1968), died unmarried
- Hon. Winifred (2 August 1882 – 9 December 1972), died unmarried
- Hon. Margaret (3 April 1886 – 23 October 1967), married in 1909 Gen. Andrew Thorne
- Hon. Nesta (21 March 1888 – 4 March 1970), married in 1920 Col. Sir Edward Warner, 2nd Baronet
- Hon. Elin (7 September 1889 – 19 February 1934), married in 1920 Thomas Cochrane, 2nd Baron Cochrane of Cults

Parliament of the United Kingdom
Preceded by Edward Douglas-Pennant	Member of Parliament for Caernarvonshire; 1866–1868	Succeeded by Love Jones-Parry
Preceded by Love Jones-Parry	Member of Parliament for Caernarvonshire; 1874–1880	Succeeded by Watkin Williams
Peerage of the United Kingdom
Preceded by Edward Douglas-Pennant	Baron Penrhyn; 1886–1907	Succeeded by Edward Douglas-Pennant
