= Robert Johns =

Robert or Bobby Johns may refer to:

- Robert H. Johns (1942–2020), American meteorologist
- Robert J. Johns, labour organizer in Manitoba, Canada
- Bobby Johns (American football) (born 1946)
- Bobby Johns (racing driver) (1932–2016), American race car driver and pit road reporter
- Bobby Johns (rugby union) (1934–1990), South African rugby union player

== See also ==
- Robert Jones (disambiguation)
