= Charles Breese (politician) =

British politician

Charles Edward Breese (26 March 1867 – 15 August 1932) was a Welsh solicitor, antiquarian and Liberal politician. He was Major during World War I and became Parliamentary Private Secretary to H. A. L. Fisher, the President of the Board of Education.

== Family ==
Breese was the son of Edward Breese (1835–1881), lawyer and antiquary, who published Kalendars of Gwynedd, a complete record of the high officers (sheriffs, MPs etc.) of the counties of Anglesey, Caernarvonshire, and Merionethshire. Edward Breese was David Lloyd George's first employer when Lloyd George became a solicitor in Portmadoc, later Prime Minister of the United Kingdom. Edward Breese was Liberal Party agent for Merioneth and South Caernarvonshire and involved Lloyd George in campaigning and canvassing for the Liberal Party in elections after 1880. In 1894 Charles Breese married Janet, daughter of the Reverend Paul Methuen Stedman. Breese was a devout Anglican by religion, even though he went on to represent a strongly nonconformist seat in Parliament. He was also a prominent Freemason.

== Career ==
Charles Breese was admitted as a solicitor in 1889 and, like Lloyd George, worked in the firm of Breese, Jones and Casson in Portmadoc, the practice founded by his father's uncle David Williams, Liberal MP for Merioneth from 1868 to 1869. Breese's cousin Sir Osmond Williams was also Liberal MP for Merioneth from 1900 to 1910. Breese served in the Volunteers and during the First World War, he fought in the European theatre, reaching the rank of Major. Like his father, he was deeply interested in antiquarianism, archaeology and heraldry. He was chairman of the executive committee of the Cambrian Archaeological Association and was one of its vice-presidents in 1930.

== Politics ==
=== Liberal politics ===
Breese was drawn into Liberal politics through his strong family association with Liberalism in North Wales. In addition to the Williams connection, there was Breese's father's involvement in Merioneth and South Caernarvonshire. Breese served on the Caernarvonshire County Council and was made an Alderman of the county. He was also sometime secretary of the Welsh National Liberal Council.

=== Caernarvonshire, 1918 ===
Given the connection between the Breese family and David Lloyd George it is not surprising that Breese was selected as Coalition Liberal Parliamentary candidate for the constituency of Caernarvonshire for the 1918 general election. Caernarvonshire was a new constituency being made up from the merger between two pre-war seats Arfon and Eifion. The former MP for Eifion, Ellis William Davies was a supporter of H H Asquith and strongly opposed to Lloyd George. He tried to manoeuvre his succession to the new Caernarvonshire seat by quickly setting up a combined Arfon and Eifion Liberal Association and packing it with his own supporters to secure the nomination. Many of the local Liberal Clubs refused to acknowledge Ellis' nomination by this route however and chose their own delegates who convened a new adoption process. The three candidates for the nomination were Breese, Ellis Davies and R. T. Jones, the general secretary of the North Wales Quarrymen's Union who was actually the Labour candidate. Breese won the contest and went on to face both men in the general election itself, Jones standing as an Independent Labour candidate and Ellis Davies as a Liberal but in support of the Asquithian party. Breese no doubt received the Coalition Coupon as he stood as a Coalition Liberal and he faced no Conservative Party opposition. He won the election gaining 10,488 votes to Jones' 8,145 with Davies third on 4,937.

=== 1918-1922 ===
In 1921 Breese was appointed by the Minister of Pensions, Ian Macpherson to serve on the Pensions Advisory Committee set up to decide on the final awards to be made to applicants under the War Pensions Act, 1921 The following year, he was appointed PPS to HAL Fisher the President of the Board of Education.

At the 1922 general election Breese stood in Caernarvonshire as a Lloyd George National Liberal. He again faced no Tory opponent and this time the Independent Liberals did not put up a candidate. However, in a straight fight with R T Jones for Labour he lost by 14,016 votes to 12,407. He did not stand for Parliament again.

== Death ==
Breese died from heart failure while grouse shooting on Arenig Mountain near Bala on 15 August 1932, aged 65 years. His daughter Beatrice married Lt. Col. John Corbet Yale of the Yale family, parents of Queen's Counsel David Yale.

== Works ==
Breese wrote two books on Welsh political subjects.

- Welsh Religious Equality: being arguments in favour of disestablishment and disendowment of the Church of England in Wales, D Lloyd, Portmadoc, 1892
- Welsh Nationality; Welsh National Press, Caernarfon, 1895

== Papers ==
Breese's papers are deposited in the National Library of Wales in Aberystwyth. The collection consists of his own papers and others acquired by him covering the period 1771–1932, including rentals and accounts for the Brithdir area, Merionethshire, 1802–1848; papers relating to the War Agricultural Committee, 1916; materials relating to Kalendars of Gwynedd, 1872–1873, which was written by his father Edward Breese; papers relating to Crown and Common lands in Wales, 1909–1920; correspondence and notes addressed to Charles E. Breese in his capacity as MP for Caernarvonshire, and correspondence submitted to him for reference, 1912–1923; miscellaneous letters, mostly addressed to Charles E. Breese, 1887–1932; correspondence from G. Rutter Fletcher to Robert Isaac Jones ('Alltud Eifion'), 1835–1905, relating to the pedigree of the Rutter family, with a copy of the pedigree; newspaper cuttings, containing articles of Welsh interest, such as Disestablishment of the Church in Wales, Crown lands in Wales etc., 1909–1920; and miscellaneous papers, 1858–1932; together with maps and prints, etc., 1771–1932.

Parliament of the United Kingdom
New constituency	Member of Parliament for Caernarvonshire; 1918 – 1922	Succeeded by Robert Thomas Jones
