= Goronwy Roberts, Baron Goronwy-Roberts =

British politician (1913–1981)

The Right Honourable The Lord Goronwy-Roberts PC FRSA
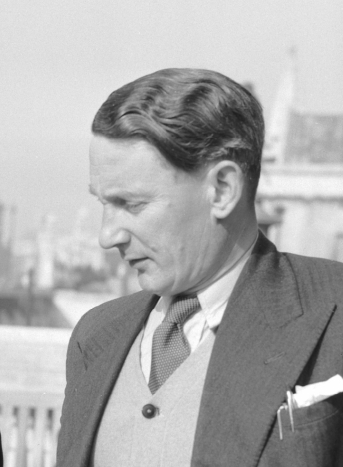

Deputy Leader of the House of Lords
- In office December 1975 – May 1979
- Prime Minister: Harold Wilson; James Callaghan
- Leader: The Lord Shepherd; The Lord Peart
- Preceded by: The Lord Beswick
- Succeeded by: The Earl Ferrers

Minister of State for Foreign and Commonwealth Affairs
- In office 4 December 1975 – 4 May 1979
- Prime Minister: Harold Wilson; James Callaghan
- Preceded by: Roy Hattersley
- Succeeded by: Peter Blaker

Under-Secretary of State for Foreign and Commonwealth Affairs
- In office 8 March 1974 – 4 December 1975
- Prime Minister: Harold Wilson
- Preceded by: Peter Blaker
- Succeeded by: Ted Rowlands

Minister of State for Trade
- In office 13 October 1969 – 19 June 1970
- Prime Minister: Harold Wilson
- Preceded by: Bill Rodgers
- Succeeded by: Frederick Corfield

Minister of State for Foreign and Commonwealth Affairs
- In office 17 October 1968 – 13 October 1969
- Prime Minister: Harold Wilson
- Preceded by: The Baroness White
- Succeeded by: Lord Shepherd

Minister of State for Education and Science
- In office 6 April 1966 – 29 August 1967
- Prime Minister: Harold Wilson
- Preceded by: Reg Prentice
- Succeeded by: Alice Bacon

Minister of State for Wales
- In office 20 October 1964 – 6 April 1966
- Prime Minister: Harold Wilson
- Preceded by: Office established
- Succeeded by: George Thomas

Member of the House of Lords
- In office 25 March 1974 – 23 July 1981; Life peerage

Member of Parliament for Caernarfon Caernarvonshire (1945–1950)
- In office 5 July 1945 – 8 February 1974
- Preceded by: Goronwy Owen
- Succeeded by: Dafydd Wigley

Personal details
- Born: Goronwy Owen Roberts; 20 September 1913
- Died: 23 July 1981 (aged 67)
- Spouse: Marian Ann Evans

Goronwy Owen Goronwy-Roberts, Baron Goronwy-Roberts, PC, FRSA (20 September 1913 – 23 July 1981), was a Welsh Labour member of Parliament.

== Early life ==
Goronwy Roberts was the younger son of Edward and Amelia Roberts from Bethesda, Gwynedd, where his father was an elder of the Presbyterian Church of Wales. He was educated at Ogwen Grammar School, Bethesda and the University College of North Wales, Bangor (now Bangor University). Later he attended the University of London and was appointed a Fellow of the University of Wales in 1938. While at Bangor, Goronwy Roberts, together with Harri Gwynn, was one of the founders of Mudiad Gwerin, a nationalist left-wing pressure group.

He served in the army in 1940–41 and in the army reserve until 1944. From 1941 until 1944 he worked as Youth Education Officer for Caernarfonshire and in 1944 was appointed lecturer in youth leadership at the University College of Swansea.

== Member of Parliament ==
Goronwy Roberts was elected Labour MP for Caernarvonshire in 1945, when he defeated the sitting Liberal MP Goronwy Owen, who had held the seat since 1923. Following boundary changes, he was elected to represent Caernarvon at the 1950 General Election, defeating the Liberal candidate by over 10,000 votes. He continued to represent the constituency until February 1974, when he lost his seat to Dafydd Wigley of Plaid Cymru.

During the 1950s, Goronwy Roberts was, together with Cledwyn Hughes and others, a stalwart of the Parliament for Wales campaign. In 1951, Plaid Cymru announced that the party would not oppose him at the general election due to his support for the campaign. Eventually, he presented the final petition to Parliament, bearing more than 250,000 signatures, in May 1956.

Goronwy Roberts was a member of the House of Commons Chairmen's Panel in 1963–64, and served in government as Minister of State at the Welsh Office from 1964 to 1966, Minister of State at the Department for Education and Science from 1966 to 1967, Minister of State for Foreign and Commonwealth Affairs 1967–69, and Minister of State for Trade 1969–70. When Labour lost power in 1970, he became an opposition spokesman on Foreign and Commonwealth Affairs.

He was appointed a Privy Counsellor in 1968.

== House of Lords and later life ==
On his defeat at the February General election in 1974 he was created a life peer as Baron Goronwy-Roberts, of Caernarvon and of Ogwen in the County of Caernarvon.

He sat on the Labour benches in the House of Lords and returned to government as Parliamentary Under-Secretary of State for Foreign, Commonwealth and Development Affairs 1974-75 and as Minister of State for Foreign and Commonwealth Affairs 1975–79. He was Deputy Leader of the House of Lords, 1975–79.

== Personal life ==
Goronwy Roberts was a Member of the Court of Governors of the National Library of Wales, the National Museum of Wales and the University College of Wales, Aberystwyth (now Aberystwyth University). He was Chairman of the Welsh publishing house, Hughes a'i fab, from 1955 to 1959. He was appointed a FRSA in 1968 and an Honorary Freeman of the Royal Borough of Caernarfon in 1972.

In 1942 Goronwy Roberts married Marian Ann Evans, daughter of David and Elizabeth Evans of Robertstown, Aberdare. They had two children: a daughter, Ann, and a son, Dafydd. Marian Goronwy-Roberts wrote a biography of Marion Phillips, the pioneering Labour campaigner for women's rights, and a number of books in Welsh, including the centenary lecture at the 1981 Welsh National Eisteddfod on the Welsh poet, scholar and politician, W. J. Gruffydd.

== Assessment ==
Goronwy Roberts was a strong supporter of devolution and of Welsh culture but was also a fierce critic of what he regarded as the nationalistic excess of Plaid Cymru. His own roots were in the Labour tradition of the quarry working communities of his constituency. His Welsh was fluent and attractive ("swynol, dawel, gerddorol"). He was greatly troubled by his defeat at the general election of February 1974.

== Sources ==
=== Books and Journals ===
- Jones, J. Graham (December 1992). "The Parliament for Wales campaign, 1950-1956" (PDF). Welsh History Review. 16 (2): 207–36.
- Morgan, Kenneth O. (1981). Rebirth of a Nation. Wales 1880-1980. Cardiff: University of Wales Press. ISBN 0-19-821760-9.

=== Online ===
- Jones, John Graham. "Goronwy Owen Roberts, Baron Goronwy-Roberts". Dictionary of Welsh Biography. National Library of Wales.
- "Lord Goronwy-Roberts, Laborite: Obituary, 24 July 1981". New York Times. 24 July 1981.
- "The Parliament for Wales Campaign and the Welsh Office". National Library of Wales.

=== Other ===
- Times Guide to the House of Commons February 1974
- Who Was Who
- Leigh Rayment's Peerage Pages
- Leigh Rayment's Historical List of MPs

Parliament of the United Kingdom
Preceded by Goronwy Owen	Member of Parliament for Caernarvonshire; 1945 – 1950	Constituency abolished
Preceded by David Price-White	Member of Parliament for Caernarvon; 1950 – Feb. 1974	Succeeded by Dafydd Wigley
Political offices
Preceded by Lord Beswick	Deputy Leader of the House of Lords; 1975–1979	Succeeded by Earl Ferrers
