= Independent Liberals (UK, 1931) =

- Leader: David Lloyd George
- Founded: 1931
- Dissolved: 1935
- Split from: Liberal Party
- Merged into: Liberal Party
- Ideology: Liberalism; Free trade Anti-National Government

At the 1931 general election, a small group of official Liberal candidates led by former Liberal Party leader, David Lloyd George, and mostly related to him, stood on a platform of opposition to the National Government and were sometimes referred to as Independent Liberals.

== Lloyd George's attitude ==
Although officially Liberal party leader, Lloyd George had been absent from the negotiations which led up to the formation of the National Government. This was due to having undergone a serious prostate operation from which he was recuperating. Although Lloyd George had been consulted daily, Acting Liberal Party leader Sir Herbert Samuel had endorsed the government and accepted office as Home Secretary. The Marquess of Reading, a Liberal party grandee who became Foreign Secretary, stated at public meetings that Lloyd George was "in full accord" with what the party had done. On 20 September Lloyd George was well enough to issue a statement which declared that the nation would pull through, and that "a faction fight among ourselves at this juncture would be unpatriotic lunacy".

Within a few days, events caused Lloyd George's attitude to shift dramatically. The immediate cause was the prospect of an early general election, to which Lloyd George was violently opposed: he believed that the Government would put forward the Conservative Party's policy of tariffs, countering the Liberal Party's firm commitment to free trade. The Liberal Party also opposed an early election when the prospect was raised at the end of September, but the Liberal 'shadow cabinet' under Samuel approved a memorandum which allowed an investigation of a special tariff. Leading Liberals, and eventually Prime Minister Ramsay MacDonald, visited Lloyd George at his home at Churt to try to come to an agreement, but found that he became more confrontational: to MacDonald, Lloyd George said that if an election were held, he would fight as a supporter of free trade and demand a definite statement of the Government's policy on the issue. Faced with Lloyd George's intractability, the Cabinet decided to call an election anyway; there would be no specific statement on tariffs but the manifesto would appeal for a 'Doctor's mandate' to do whatever was necessary to repair the economy. Liberal ministers accepted this decision.

== 1931 election ==
When the election was announced, Lloyd George did as he had indicated and issued a semi-official statement through the Press Association which denounced the Liberal ministers who had "commit[ted] themselves to the consideration of a tariff policy" as having engaged in "a gross betrayal alike of the interest of the country and of the party to which they profess allegiance". Ominously the statement concluded by encouraging all candidates who were elected in support of free trade to "provide... the nucleus of a new progressive party". Lloyd George still controlled a political fund which he had set up while the party was divided between him and H. H. Asquith, and declined to release it to support Liberal candidates who endorsed the National Government. Two Liberal MPs allied to Lloyd George who opposed the calling of an election, his son Gwilym and Goronwy Owen (who was Gwilym's brother-in-law), resigned from the Government.

At the election, six Liberal candidates formally declared their opposition to the National Government. Five had sat in the previous parliament, with the addition of journalist and novelist Edgar Wallace making his first (and last) appearance as a parliamentary candidate for any party.

Date of election	Constituency	Candidate	Votes	%	Notes
1931 general election	Anglesey	Megan Lloyd George	14,839	58.3	Sitting MP re-elected
1931 general election	Blackpool	Edgar Wallace	19,524	26.9	Candidate defeated
1931 general election	Caernarvon Boroughs	Rt Hon David Lloyd George	17,101	59.3	Sitting MP re-elected
1931 general election	Caernarvonshire	Goronwy Owen	14,993	39.0	Sitting MP re-elected
1931 general election	Hereford	Frank Owen	12,465	39.1	Sitting MP defeated
1931 general election	Pembrokeshire	Gwilym Lloyd George	24,606	55.7	Sitting MP re-elected

In addition, in Halifax Frank Sykes stood as an unofficial, anti-National Government, Liberal candidate after the local Liberal Association decided not to nominate its own candidate; he lost his deposit with 2,578 votes (4.6%).

== New Parliament ==
In the new Parliament, the group of Independent Liberal MPs rejected attempts to reunify all the Liberals (including the pro-tariff Liberal National Party) under a single party whip and consistently opposed the National Government. In the House of Commons rather than sit with the rest of the Independent Liberals, Lloyd George sat on the opposition front bench in the corner seat next to the gangway, This was in contravention of the convention that this be occupied exclusively by the Official Opposition, which at this point was held by the Labour Party. Perhaps because Labour's dire lack of any MPs with ministerial experience, the former Prime Minister stayed on the Opposition Front Bench. Lloyd George continued to occupy this seat regardless until the end of his Commons career. He was elevated to the House of Lords as Earl Lloyd George of Dwyfor in early 1945 but died before taking his seat in the Upper House.

The mainstream Liberal Party meanwhile experienced difficulties with its relations with the National Government, which was dominated by Conservatives who supported tariffs. On 22 January 1932 the Cabinet announced an "agreement to differ", suspending Cabinet collective responsibility so that the four members of the Cabinet who supported free trade (Liberals Herbert Samuel, Donald Maclean and Sir Archibald Sinclair together with Viscount Snowden who was nominally National Labour) should be "at liberty to express their views by speech and vote". When (in September 1932) the Cabinet endorsed the conclusion of the Ottawa Conference, favouring protective tariffs, all Liberal ministers together with Viscount Snowden resigned but the Liberals continued to support the National Government on all other policies.

In February 1932, Harry Nathan the Liberal MP for Bethnal Green North East crossed the floor from the Liberal government benches to sit with the Lloyd George Liberal group, in opposition to the National government. He resigned the Liberal Whip in February 1933 to formally sit as an Independent Liberal but a year later joined the Labour Party.

In the East Fife by-election of February 1933, the local Conservatives supported the Liberal National candidate. David Keir was nominated as an unofficial Liberal candidate in support of free trade and against the National Government; Keir lost his deposit. At a by-election in Ashford the following month, the official Liberal candidate Rev Roderick Kedward (who had defended and lost the same seat in 1931 as a Liberal National) declared that he was fighting as an Independent Liberal and would oppose the National Government if elected (which he was not). Various Liberal Party meetings and conferences during 1933 pressed the party to go into opposition; on 14 November 1933, the majority of Liberal MPs voted to do so.

== Reunion ==
When the new Parliamentary session opened on 21 November 1933, the Liberals were sitting on the opposition benches. However the Lloyd George group were still termed 'Independent Liberals' and remained apart from the other Liberals. In the 1935 General Election, the two groups fought separately with Lloyd George more interested in promoting a cross party alliance opposed to the National Government. The Independent Liberals stood again for the four seats they held after the 1931 General Election and won them all. In comparison, the Liberal party lost half its seats including the one held by their leader Herbert Samuel.

With Samuel gone, Lloyd George and the Independent Liberals rejoined the main Liberal group and took part in the decision to nominate Archibald Sinclair as party leader.

== See also ==
- Liberalism
- Contributions to liberal theory
- Liberalism worldwide
- List of liberal parties
- Liberal democracy
- Liberalism in the United Kingdom
