= Watkin Williams (Liberal politician) =

British judge and politician

Sir Charles James Watkin Williams (23 September 1828 – 17 July 1884) was a Welsh judge, medical doctor and Liberal politician who sat in the House of Commons from 1868 to 1880.

== Life ==
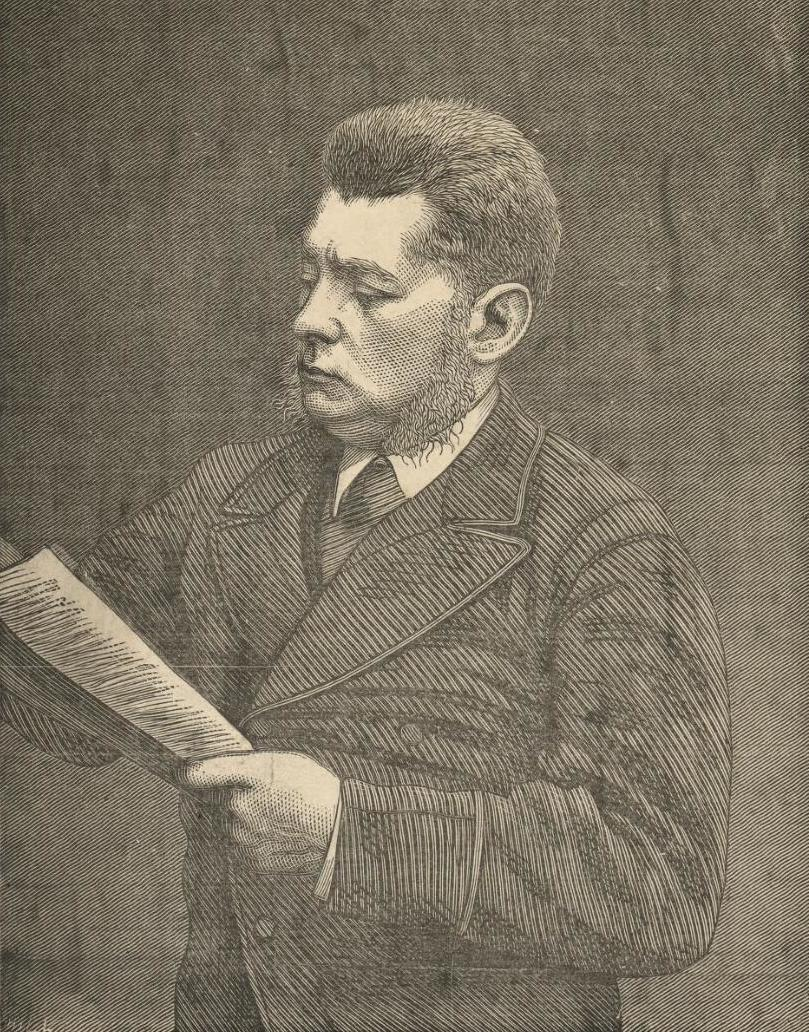
Portrait of Watkin Williams, Esq., Q.C., M.P.

Williams was the eldest son of Peter Williams, rector of Llansannan, Denbighshire, and his wife Lydia Sophia Price, daughter of the Rev. James Price of Plas-yn-Lysfaen, Denbighshire. Henry Wynn-Williams was his younger brother. After leaving Ruthin grammar school he studied medicine under John Eric Erichsen at University College Hospital, where he won the gold medal for comparative anatomy, and acted for a time as house-surgeon. He became the lifelong friend of Sir Henry Thompson and Sir John Russell Reynolds.

But he soon decided to abandon medicine for law. He spent a few terms at St. Mary Hall, Oxford, where he matriculated on 1 May 1851, but never graduated. In the same year (1851) he entered at the Middle Temple, and read in the chambers of Horatio Lloyd, known as a special pleader. When called to the bar three years later, he practised in the same branch of the profession, and in 1857 published An Introduction to the Principles and Practice of Pleading in Civil Actions in the Supreme Courts of Law at Westminster. This work established his reputation and brought him large practice. It continued in use as the standard text-book for students at the Inns of Court till the passing of the Judicature Acts. In 1859 Williams was named 'tubman' of the Court of Exchequer.

He went first the home circuit, and afterwards the south-eastern. He took silk in 1873. He made a speciality of financial and mercantile cases, such as that of Anderson v. Morice in 1876. In Thomas v. The Queen, in which he had Sir John Holker, Sir Richard Baggallay, and Charles Synge Christopher Bowen against him, Williams vindicated the title of the subject to sue the crown for unliquidated damages resulting from breach of contract.

At the 1868 general election Williams was elected Liberal Member of Parliament for the Denbigh Boroughs. He sat for that constituency till 1880. As early as 1854 he had published a pamphlet on the Law of Church Rates, and, though himself a churchman, he on 24 May 1870 moved a resolution in the House of Commons in favour of Welsh disestablishment. The motion was opposed by William Gladstone, and lost by 209 against 45 votes. In 1875 Williams served as a member of Sir Henry James's committee on foreign loans. At the 1880 general election he was elected for Caernarvonshire, soundly defeating the sitting Conservative MP the Hon. George Douglas-Pennant. When Gladstone returned to office in 1880, he was offered but declined the post of judge-advocate-general. However a few months later he gave up his seat when he was appointed a judge.

In November 1880, on the promotion of Sir Robert Lush to a lord-justiceship, his son-in-law, Williams, was appointed to the vacant puisne judgeship, even though he had recently made a public declaration that he would never accept such an office. He concurred in the judgment of the crown cases reserved in upholding the conviction of Most in connection with the murder of Alexander II of Russia. In Sanders v. Richardson he decided that a parent who sends a child to school without fee is liable to legal penalty. His judgment in the case of privilege of counsel (Munster v. Lamb), when he nonsuited the plaintiff, was upheld by the superior courts. To the council of judges Williams submitted a paper advocating the abolition of distinctions between the common pleas and exchequer divisions, but the retention of the chiefships. He publicly repudiated their decisions announced in November 1881, declaring that nothing less than an act of parliament should ever induce him to deprive a prisoner of the right of making a statement to a jury of facts not given in evidence. Williams sat with Mr. Justice Mathew as the tribunal of commerce.

Williams died suddenly of heart disease at the age of 55 at Nottingham, where he was on circuit with Mr. Justice Lopes. 'Suddenly of heart disease' euphemistically describes his demise in one of the town's brothels on Forman Street. A contemporary Nottingham memorial card reported that he 'departed this life suddenly at Mrs. Salmands', and noted that 'in eight feet deep of solid earth Sir Watkin Williams lies. He lost his breath, which caused his death, 'twixt Nellie Blankey's thighs'. He was buried at Kensal Green cemetery on 22 July 1884.

=== Judgements ===
- Foakes v Beer (Watkin Williams sitting on the Queens Bench) [1884] UKHL 1, [1881-85] All ER Rep 106, (1884) 9 App Cas 605; 54 LJQB 130; 51 LT 833; 33 WR 233 - a leading case from the House of Lords on the legal concept of consideration

== Works ==
Besides the works mentioned, he published in 1853 An Essay upon the Philosophy of Evidence, with a Discussion concerning the Belief in Clairvoyance; a second edition was issued in 1855.

== Family ==
Williams was twice married, and left several children. His first wife, Henrietta, daughter of William Henry Carey, esq., and niece of Vice-chancellor Malins, died in 1864. In the following year he married Elizabeth, daughter of Lord-justice Lush, who survived him.

== Notes ==
Attribution

This article incorporates text from a publication now in the public domain: "Williams, Charles James Watkin". Dictionary of National Biography. London: Smith, Elder & Co. 1885–1900.

Parliament of the United Kingdom
| Preceded by Townshend Mainwaring | Member of Parliament for Denbigh Boroughs; 1868 – 1880 | Succeeded by Sir Robert Cunliffe, Bt |
| Preceded by George Douglas-Pennant | Member of Parliament for Caernarvonshire; April 1880 – December 1880 | Succeeded by William Rathbone VI |
