= Bobby Jones (academic) =

American academic

- Born: 13 January 1942
- Died: 18 April 2001 (aged 59)
- Occupations: Educator, youth advisor

Academic work
- Institutions: Mercer University
- Main interests: Mentoring

Bobby Jones, PhD (28 February 1932 - 21 December 1992) was an American educator and academic administrator who became the first African American to earn tenure at Mercer University as well as chair of the Education Department. His contributions were mainly modernist styles and teaching techniques which has spanned till date. He was cited by her students in A Joyful Passion for Teaching.

Jones was credited in the novel, Macon Black and White to have contributed towards a low racial divide rate which existed throughout central Georgia. According to his successors, Jone devoted his life to helping others realize their goals. He also aided the establishment of Mercer University's first Upward Bound Program where he mentored youths.
