= Robert J. Jones (trade unionist) =

Welsh trade unionist (1899–1962)

Robert J. Jones (6 May 1899 – 26 March 1962) was a Welsh trade union leader.

Born in North Wales, Jones worked from the age of thirteen. During World War I, he served in the British Army. After the war, he began working in a slate quarry. He joined the North Wales Quarrymen's Union, a section of the Transport and General Workers' Union, and began working for it full time in 1934. He was appointed as acting general secretary in 1946, then in 1950 became general secretary of the union. From 1946 to 1957, he also served on the General Council of the Trades Union Congress. He retired in 1957, and died five years later.

Jones also served as a member of Merionethshire County Council, and served on the local district of the Welsh Board for Industry.

Trade union offices
Preceded by R. W. Williams	Secretary of the North Wales Quarrymen's Section of the Transport and General Workers' Union; 1950–1957	Succeeded by A. Owen
