= North Wales Quarrymen's Union =

Former trade union of the United Kingdom

- Undeb Chwarelwyr Gogledd Cymru
- Merged into: Transport and General Workers' Union
- Founded: 27 April 1874
- Dissolved: 1960
- Location: United Kingdom
- Members: 2,607 (1907)
- Affiliations: TUC

The North Wales Quarrymen's Union (NWQU) was a trade union in the United Kingdom.

== History ==
The union was founded on 27 April 1874 at the Queen's Hotel, Caernarfon after a month of discussions between quarrymen from Dinorwic and other supporters. Initially the union was not led by miners but radical Liberals who later became supporters of David Lloyd George's Cymru Fydd It affiliated with the Transport and General Workers' Union in 1923, but maintained a separate identity until 1960.

== Leadership ==
=== General Secretaries ===
1874: William John Parry
1876: W. J. Williams
1897: J. E. Williams
1898: William H. Williams
1908: Robert Jones
1933: R. W. Williams
1946: Robert J. Jones
1957: A. Owen

=== Presidents ===
1874: Morgan Richards
1874: John Lloyd Jones
1876: William John Parry
1880: Robert Parry of Ceunant
1884: William John Parry
1890s: W. W. Jones
1903:

== See also ==
- List of trade unions
- Slate industry in Wales
- TGWU amalgamations
- Transport and General Workers' Union
