= Caernarvonshire (UK Parliament constituency) =

UK Parliament constituency (1918–1950)

- Former county constituency for the House of Commons

1918–1950
- Created from: Arfon and Eifion
- Replaced by: Caernarvon and Conway

1542–1885
- Replaced by: Arfon and Eifion

Caernarvonshire was a constituency of the House of Commons of the Parliament of England, then of the Parliament of Great Britain from 1707 to 1800, and of the Parliament of the United Kingdom from 1801 to 1885 and from 1918 until 1950. It elected one Member of Parliament (MP) by the first past the post system.

== Members of Parliament ==
- Constituency created (1542)

=== MPs 1542–1604 ===
Parliament	Member
1542	?John "Wynn" ap Maredudd
1545	John Puleston
1547	Sir John Puleston, died 1552 and replaced by John "Wynn" ap Maredudd}
1553 (Mar)	John Wynn ap Hugh
1553 (Oct)	Morris Wynn
1554 (Apr)	Morris Wynn
1554 (Nov)	David Lloyd ap Thomas
1555	Sir Rhys Gruffydd
1558	William Wynn Williams
1558–1559	Robert Pugh
1563 (Jan)	Morris Wynn
1571	John Wynn ap Hugh
1572 (Apr)	John Gwynne, died 1574 and replaced by William Thomas
1584	William Thomas
1586	John Wynn
1588 (Oct)	Hugh Gwyn Bodvel
1593	William Maurice
1597 (Oct)	William Griffith
1601 (Sep)	William Jones

=== MPs 1604–1950 ===
Year	Member	Party
1604	Sir William Maurice	
1614	Richard Wynn	
1621	John Griffith	
1624	Thomas Glynn	
1625	Thomas Glynn	
1626	John Griffith	
1628	John Griffith	
1640 April	Thomas Glynn	
1640 November	John Griffith junior	disabled 1642
1647	Sir Richard Wynn, 4th Baronet	
1653	Not represented in Barebones Parliament	

Year	First Member	Second Member
Two members in first and second protectorate parliaments
1654	Sir John Glynne	Thomas Madryn
1656	Sir John Glynne; Henry Lawrence	Robert Williams

Year	Member	Party
1659	William Glynne	
1660	Sir John Glynne	
1661	Sir Richard Wynn, 4th Baronet	
1675	Robert Bulkeley, 2nd Viscount Bulkeley	
1679	Thomas Bulkeley	
1689	Sir William Williams, 6th Baronet	
1697	Thomas Bulkeley	
1705	Sir John Wynn, 5th Baronet	
1713	William Griffith	
1715	John Griffith	
1740	John Wynn	
1741	William Bodvell	
1754	Sir John Wynn, 2nd Baronet	
1761	Sir Thomas Wynn, 3rd Baronet	
1774	Thomas Assheton Smith	
1780	John Parry	
1790	Sir Robert Williams, 9th Baronet	Whig
1826	Sir Thomas Wynn, 3rd Baronet	Non Partisan
1830	Charles Griffith-Wynne	Tory
1832	Thomas Assheton Smith	Tory
1834	Thomas Assheton Smith	Conservative
1837	John Ormsby-Gore	Conservative
1841	Edward Douglas-Pennant	Conservative
1866	George Douglas-Pennant	Conservative
1868	Love Jones-Parry	Liberal
1874	Hon. George Douglas-Pennant	Conservative
April 1880	Watkin Williams	Liberal
December 1880	William Rathbone	Liberal
1885	Constituency abolished	
1918	Constituency re-created	
1918	Charles Edward Breese	Coalition Liberal
Jan 1922	Charles Edward Breese	National Liberal
Nov 1922	Robert Jones	Labour
1923	Goronwy Owen	Liberal
1945	Goronwy Roberts	Labour
1950	Constituency abolished	

== Uncontested elections 1830–1865 ==
General election 1830: Caernarvonshire
Party	Candidate	Votes	%	±%
Tory	Charles Griffith-Wynne	Unopposed		
Registered electors		c. 1,500		
Tory gain from Nonpartisan				

General election 1831: Caernarvonshire
Party	Candidate	Votes	%	±%
Tory	Charles Griffith-Wynne	Unopposed		
Registered electors		c. 1,500		
Tory hold				

General election 1832: Caernarvonshire
Party	Candidate	Votes	%	±%
Tory	Thomas Assheton Smith	Unopposed		
Registered electors		1,688		
Tory hold				

General election 1835: Caernarvonshire
Party	Candidate	Votes	%	±%
Conservative	Thomas Assheton Smith	Unopposed		
Registered electors		1,642		
Conservative hold				

General election 1837: Caernarvonshire
Party	Candidate	Votes	%	±%
Conservative	John Ormsby-Gore	Unopposed		
Registered electors		1,791		
Conservative hold				

General election 1841: Caernarvonshire
Party	Candidate	Votes	%	±%
Conservative	Edward Douglas-Pennant	Unopposed		
Registered electors		2,162		
Conservative hold				

General election 1847: Caernarvonshire
Party	Candidate	Votes	%	±%
Conservative	Edward Douglas-Pennant	Unopposed		
Registered electors		2,117		
Conservative hold				

General election 1852: Caernarvonshire
Party	Candidate	Votes	%	±%
Conservative	Edward Douglas-Pennant	Unopposed		
Registered electors		1,913		
Conservative hold				

General election 1857: Caernarvonshire
Party	Candidate	Votes	%	±%
Conservative	Edward Douglas-Pennant	Unopposed		
Registered electors		2,060		
Conservative hold				

General election 1859: Caernarvonshire
Party	Candidate	Votes	%	±%
Conservative	Edward Douglas-Pennant	Unopposed		
Registered electors		2,116		
Conservative hold				

General election 1865: Caernarvonshire
Party	Candidate	Votes	%	±%
Conservative	Edward Douglas-Pennant	Unopposed		
Registered electors		2,190		
Conservative hold				

== Elections 1866–1885 ==
=== Elections in the 1860s ===
Pennant was elevated to the peerage, becoming Lord Penrhyn, causing a by-election.

By-election, 14 Aug 1866: Caernarvonshire
Party	Candidate	Votes	%	±%
Conservative	George Douglas-Pennant	Unopposed		
Conservative hold				

General election 1868: Caernarvonshire
Party	Candidate	Votes	%	±%
Liberal	Love Jones-Parry	1,968	52.0	New
Conservative	George Douglas-Pennant	1,815	48.0	N/A
Majority		153	4.0	N/A
Turnout		3,783	78.0	N/A
Registered electors		4,852		
Liberal gain from Conservative		Swing	N/A	

=== Elections in the 1870s ===
General election 1874: Caernarvonshire
Party	Candidate	Votes	%	±%
Conservative	George Douglas-Pennant	2,750	54.3	+6.3
Liberal	Love Jones-Parry	2,318	45.7	−6.3
Majority		432	8.6	N/A
Turnout		5,068	80.6	+2.6
Registered electors		6,286		
Conservative gain from Liberal		Swing	+6.3	

=== Elections in the 1880s ===
General election 1880: Caernarvonshire
Party	Candidate	Votes	%	±%
Liberal	Watkin Williams	3,303	60.0	+14.3
Conservative	George Douglas-Pennant	2,206	40.0	−14.3
Majority		1,097	20.0	N/A
Turnout		5,509	82.8	+2.2
Registered electors		6,652		
Liberal gain from Conservative		Swing	+14.3	

Williams resigned after being appointed a judge of the Queen's Bench Division of the High Court of Justice

By-election, 2 Dec 1880: Caernarvonshire
Party	Candidate	Votes	%	±%
Liberal	William Rathbone	3,180	59.7	−0.3
Conservative	Hugh Ellis-Nanney	2,151	40.3	+0.3
Majority		1,029	19.4	−0.6
Turnout		5,331	80.1	−2.7
Registered electors		6,652		
Liberal hold		Swing	-0.3	

== Elections 1918–1945 ==
=== Elections in the 1910s ===
General election 1918: Caernarvonshire
Party		Candidate	Votes	%
C	National Liberal	Charles Edward Breese	10,488	44.5
	Independent Labour	Robert Jones	8,145	34.6
	Liberal	Ellis William Davies	4,937	21.0
Majority			2,343	9.9
Turnout			23,570	64.6
Registered electors				
	National Liberal win (new seat)			
C indicates candidate endorsed by the coalition government.

=== Elections in the 1920s ===
General election 1922: Caernarvonshire
Party	Candidate	Votes	%	±%
Labour	Robert Jones	14,016	53.0	+18.4
National Liberal	Charles Edward Breese	12,407	47.0	+2.5
Majority		1,609	6.0	−3.9
Turnout		26,423	70.6	+6.0
Labour gain from National Liberal		Swing		

General election 1923: Caernarvonshire
Party	Candidate	Votes	%	±%
Liberal	Goronwy Owen	15,043	52.7	+5.7
Labour	Robert Jones	13,521	47.3	−5.7
Majority		1,522	5.4	N/A
Turnout		28,564	74.9	+4.3
Liberal gain from Labour		Swing	+5.7	

General election 1924: Caernarvonshire
Party	Candidate	Votes	%	±%
Liberal	Goronwy Owen	15,033	50.8	−1.9
Labour	Robert Jones	14,564	49.2	+1.9
Majority		469	1.6	−3.8
Turnout		29,597	76.6	+1.7
Liberal hold		Swing	−1.9	

General election 1929: Caernarvonshire
Party	Candidate	Votes	%	±%
Liberal	Goronwy Owen	18,507	47.8	−3.0
Labour	Robert Jones	14,867	38.5	−10.7
Unionist	D. Fowden Jones	4,669	12.1	New
Plaid Cymru	Lewis Valentine	609	1.6	New
Majority		3,640	9.3	+7.7
Turnout		38,652	81.4	+4.8
Liberal hold		Swing	+3.9	

=== Elections in the 1930s ===
General election 1931: Caernarvonshire
Party	Candidate	Votes	%	±%
Independent Liberals	Goronwy Owen	14,993	39.0	−8.8
Labour	Elwyn Jones	14,299	37.2	−1.3
National Independent	W P O Evans	7,990	20.8	New
Plaid Cymru	John Edward Daniel	1,136	3.0	+1.4
Majority		694	1.8	−7.5
Turnout		38,418	80.0	−1.4
Independent Liberals hold		Swing		

- Owen opposed the National Government

General election 1935: Caernarvonshire
Party	Candidate	Votes	%	±%
Liberal	Goronwy Owen	17,947	48.6	+9.6
Labour	Elwyn Jones	16,450	44.5	+7.3
Plaid Cymru	John Edward Daniel	2,534	6.9	+3.9
Majority		1,497	4.1	+2.3
Turnout		36,931	74.9	−5.1
Liberal hold		Swing		

General Election 1939–40:

Another General Election was required to take place before the end of 1940. The political parties had been making preparations for an election to take place from 1939 and by the end of this year, the following candidates had been selected;

- Liberal: Goronwy Owen
- Labour: Elwyn Jones

=== Elections in the 1940s ===
General election 1945: Caernarvonshire
Party	Candidate	Votes	%	±%
Labour	Goronwy Roberts	22,043	55.3	+10.8
Liberal	Goronwy Owen	15,637	39.3	−9.3
Plaid Cymru	Ambrose Bebb	2,152	5.4	−1.5
Majority		6,406	16.0	N/A
Turnout		39,832	77.7	+2.8
Labour gain from Liberal		Swing	+10.0	
