= Goronwy Owen (politician) =

Welsh Liberal politician and businessman (1881–1963)

Sir Goronwy Owen DSO JP DL

Comptroller of the Household
- In office 14 September 1931 – 9 October 1931
- Prime Minister: Ramsay MacDonald
- Preceded by: Tom Henderson
- Succeeded by: Walter Rea

Liberal Chief Whip
- In office 8 September 1931 – 4 November 1931
- Leader: Herbert Samuel
- Preceded by: Archibald Sinclair
- Succeeded by: Walter Rea

Member of Parliament for Caernarvonshire
- In office 6 December 1923 – 29 July 1945
- Preceded by: Robert Jones
- Succeeded by: Goronwy Roberts

Personal details
- Born: Goronwy Owen; 22 June 1881 Colomendy, Denbighshire, Wales, UK
- Died: 26 September 1963 (aged 82)
- Party: Liberal (Before 1931, 1935–1963)
- Other political affiliations: Independent Liberal (1931–1935)
- Education: Ardwyn Grammar School
- Alma mater: University College of Wales, Aberystwyth

Sir Goronwy Owen DSO JP DL (22 June 1881 – 26 September 1963) was a Welsh Liberal politician and businessman.

== Early life and career ==
Owen was born at Penllwyn, Aberystwyth. He was educated at Ardwyn Grammar School and the University College of Wales, Aberystwyth where he gained an MA degree.

He worked as a schoolteacher in London until 1914 but then joined the London Welsh Battalion (later 15th (Service) Battalion, Royal Welsh Fusiliers (1st London Welsh)) as an officer. He served in France and was awarded the Distinguished Service Order in 1916. He was promoted to Brigade Major and twice mentioned in dispatches. By 1948 however he was being referred to as having achieved the rank of Lieutenant-Colonel. After the war, he was called to the Bar by Gray's Inn but the law was a subordinate interest to business and politics.

He became a member of the London Stock Exchange and went into the oil business. He became president of British Controlled Oilfields which had interests in Venezuela and the Caribbean and was on the board of the Trinidad Petroleum Development Company as well as having interests in other commercial and trading companies.

== Political career ==
Owen was elected as Liberal Member of Parliament (MP) for Caernarvonshire at the 1923 general election. He defended the seat at the 1929 general election as a Liberal, beating Labour, Conservative and Welsh nationalist opposition with a majority of 3,460. At the 1931 election he was styled an Independent Liberal. He held his seat against Labour and two nationalist opponents but by the much narrower majority of 694. At the next election in 1935, Owen again stood as an Independent Liberal against Labour and nationalist opposition, increasing his majority to 1,497. At Labour's landslide victory in the 1945 general election, he again had no Conservative candidate to contend with but he once more faced Labour and Welsh nationalist challenge. He was beaten by the similarly named Labour candidate Goronwy Owen Roberts by a majority of over 6,000.

=== The Lloyd George Family Group of MPs ===
Goronwy Owen was distantly related to David Lloyd George by marriage; his wife Gladwyn, whom he married in 1925, was the sister of Edna, the wife of Gwilym Lloyd George. During the Liberal splits of the 1930s Owen was therefore part of Lloyd George's so-called 'family group' of four Independent Liberal MPs, which also comprised Lloyd George, his daughter Lady Megan Lloyd George, and his son Gwilym. In August 1931 the Lloyd George family group initially supported the formation of the National government. Gwilym became a junior minister at the Board of Trade and Owen became a government whip, taking the post of Comptroller of the Household. However they broke with the coalition over the issue of Free Trade and resigned their government posts in October. For a brief time also in 1931 Owen was Liberal Chief Whip in the House of Commons. He was knighted in the New Years Honours List of 1944 for political and public services. The family group re-took the Liberal Whip immediately after the 1935 General Election.

== Personal life ==
Owen had a home in north Wales and played an active part in local and political life there. He was a councillor and Alderman of Caernarfonshire County Council, Chairman of the Agricultural Wages Committee for Caernarfonshire, Anglesey, Merionethshire and Montgomeryshire. He was a magistrate and deputy lieutenant for Caernarfonshire. He was also sometime president of the North Wales Liberal Federation. Owen was sometime Chairman of Caernarvonshire and Anglesey Territorial and Auxiliary Forces Association and County Army Welfare Officer. He was Chairman of Gwynedd Police Authority from 1955 to 1956, having served as Vice-Chairman from 1954 to 1955).

== Sources ==
=== Books and Journals ===
- Jones, J. Graham (June 1993). "The Liberal Party and Wales, 1945-79" (PDF). Welsh History Review. 16 (3): 326–55.

Parliament of the United Kingdom
Preceded by Robert Thomas Jones	Member of Parliament for Caernarvonshire; 1923–1945	Succeeded by Goronwy Owen Roberts
Party political offices
Preceded by Archibald Sinclair	Liberal Chief Whip; 1931	Succeeded by Walter Rea
