= Robert Jones (Labour politician) =

Welsh quarryman, trade unionist and Labour Party politician

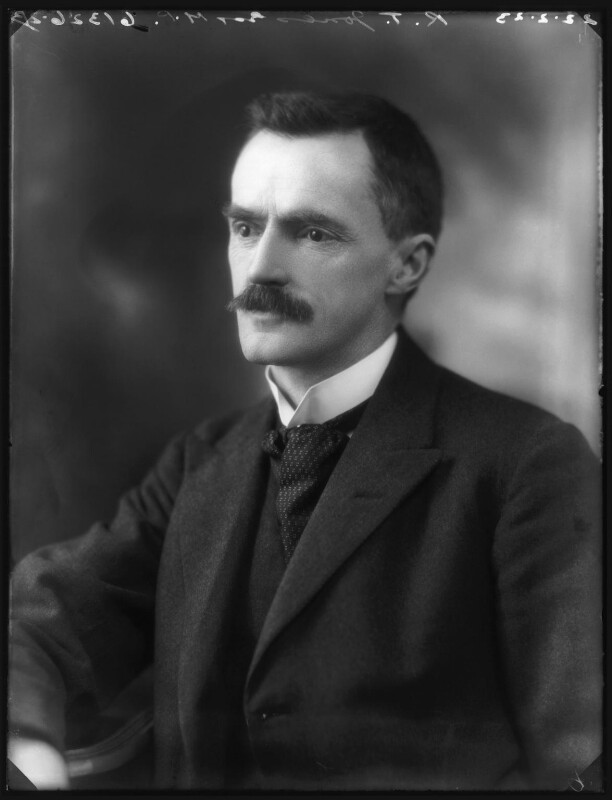
Robert Thomas Jones

Robert Thomas (R. T.) Jones (14 October 1874 – 15 December 1940) was a Welsh quarryman, trade unionist and Labour Party politician.

Born in Blaenau Ffestiniog, Jones started work in the slate quarries when was 13. His first language was Welsh. As a young man he was influenced by R. Silyn Roberts (1871–1930), the Welsh poet, social reformer and early ILP supporter, who was Minister of the Calvinistic Methodist chapel at Tanygrisiau in Blaenau Ffestiniog from 1905 to 1912.

He was elected at the 1922 general election as the Member of Parliament (MP) for Caernarvonshire, having unsuccessfully contested the seat in 1918. He was defeated at the 1923 general election by the Liberal Party candidate Goronwy Owen, and although he stood again for Caernarvonshire in 1924 and 1929 he was never returned to the House of Commons.

Jones served on the TUC General Council from 1921 to 1932. From 1908 to 1933, he was General Secretary of the North Wales Quarrymen's Union.

Parliament of the United Kingdom
Preceded by Charles Edward Breese	Member of Parliament for Caernarvonshire; 1922 – 1923	Succeeded by Goronwy Owen
Trade union offices
Preceded by William H. Williams	General Secretary of the North Wales Quarrymen's Union; 1908–1922	Post abolished
New post	Secretary of the North Wales Quarrymen's Section of the Transport and General Workers' Union; 1923–1933	Succeeded by R. W. Williams
