= John Josiah Guest =

Welsh engineer, MP and entrepreneur (1785–1852)

Sir John Josiah Guest Bt FRS
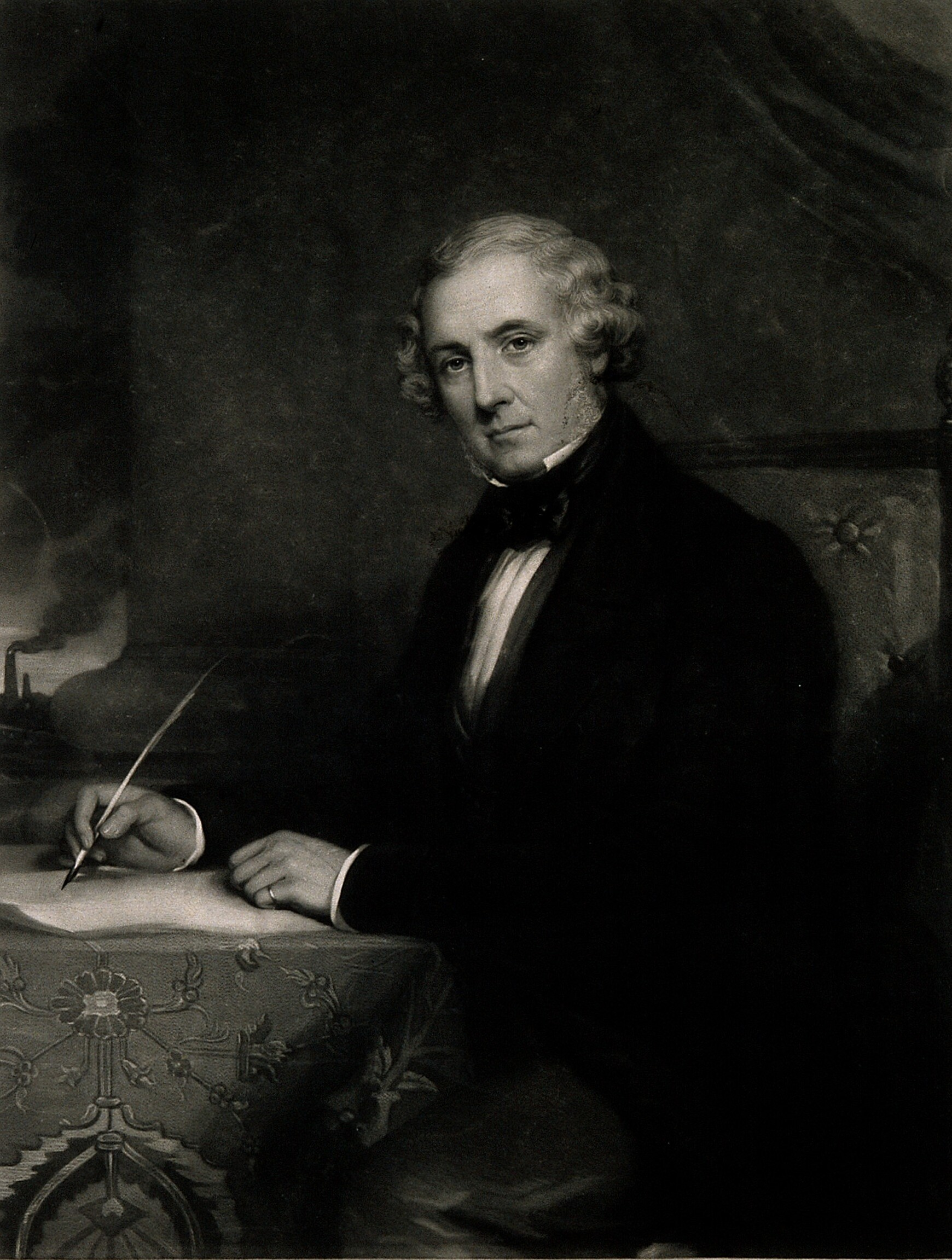

Member of Parliament for Merthyr Tydfil
- In office 1832–1852
- Preceded by: Office created
- Succeeded by: Henry Bruce

Personal details
- Born: Josiah John Guest; 2 February 1785 Dowlais, Merthyr Tydfil, Wales
- Died: 26 November 1852 (aged 67)
- Resting place: St John's Church, Dowlais
- Spouse(s): Maria Rankin; Lady Charlotte Bertie
- Children: Charlotte Maria Du Cane; Ivor Bertie Guest, 1st Baron Wimborne; Katharine Gwladys Alderson; Thomas Merthyr Guest; Montague John Guest; Augustus Frederick Guest; Arthur Edward Guest; Mary Enid Evelyn, Lady Layard; Constance Rhiannon Eliot; Blanche Vere Ponsonby, Countess of Bessborough
- Parents: Thomas Guest (father); Jemima Revel Phillips (mother)
- Occupation: Businessman

Sir Josiah John Guest, 1st Baronet (2 February 1785 – 26 November 1852), known as John Josiah Guest, was a British engineer, entrepreneur and politician.

== Early life ==
Guest was born on 2 February 1785 in Dowlais, Merthyr Tydfil, Wales. He was the son of Thomas Guest, a partner in the Dowlais Iron Company, and Jemima Revel Phillips. Guest was educated at Bridgnorth Grammar School and Monmouth School.

== Career ==
After attending school, he learned the trade of ironmaking in his father's foundry at the hands of the works manager, John Evans. Guest was renowned for his ability to roll a bar of steel or cut a tram of coal as well as any of his father's workmen. Upon his father's death in 1807, Guest inherited his father's share of the company and developed the business, becoming sole owner of the works in 1815. By the time of his death in 1852, the Dowlais Iron Company had become the largest producer of iron in the world.

Guest was elected in 1825 as Member of Parliament for Honiton, Devon, holding the seat until the 1831 general election during the Reform Crisis. In 1832 he became the first MP for Merthyr Tydfil as a Whig, and in 1837 he launched the campaign to have the town incorporated.

In 1838, Guest was created a baronet, of Dowlais in the County of Glamorgan. After his death in 1852, Guest was succeeded by his eldest son, who was elevated to the peerage in 1880 as Baron Wimborne, of Canford Magna in the County of Dorset, on Disraeli's initiative.

=== Philanthropy ===
His public works included a school at Dowlais, designed by Sir Charles Barry. Guest was a Fellow of the Royal Society and a Member of the Institution of Civil Engineers. He was the first chairman of the Taff Vale Railway.

Upon his purchase of Canford Manor in 1846, Guest set in motion the process of building new estate cottages for workers on the estate to improve living conditions. Although the first was built after his death, his wife, Charlotte Guest, and daughter-in-law Cornelia Guest oversaw the building of these 'Lady Wimborne Cottages'.

=== Freemasonry ===
In August 1840, Guest was appointed Master of Loyal Cambrian Lodge, No. 110 in Merthyr Tydfil.

== Personal life ==
Guest family tree

On 11 March 1817, Guest married Maria Rankin but their marriage was short-lived, Maria dying just nine months later in January 1818. On 29 July 1833, he subsequently married Lady Charlotte Elizabeth Bertie, daughter of Albemarle Bertie, 9th Earl of Lindsey.

Together, they had five sons and five daughters, including:

- Charlotte Maria Guest (1834–1902), who married Richard Du Cane (d. 1904), brother of Edmund Frederick Du Cane.
- Ivor Bertie Guest (1835–1914), who married Lady Cornelia Henrietta Maria Spencer-Churchill (1847–1927), daughter of John Spencer-Churchill, 7th Duke of Marlborough
- Katharine Gwladys Guest (1837–1926), who married the Reverend Frederick Cecil Alderson (d. 1907), son of Sir Edward Hall Alderson
- Thomas Merthyr Guest (1838–1904), who married the writer Lady Theodora Grosvenor (1840–1924), daughter of Richard Grosvenor, 2nd Marquess of Westminster
- Montague John Guest (1839–1909), a Liberal politician, who never married.
- Augustus Frederick Guest (1840–1862), who died aged 21.
- Arthur Edward Guest (1841–1898), a Conservative politician, who married Adeline Mary Chapman (d. 1931)
- Mary Enid Evelyn Guest (1843–1912), who married Sir Austen Henry Layard (1817–1894).
- Constance Rhiannon Guest (1844–1916), who married Hon. Charles George Cornwallis Eliot (1839–1901), youngest son of Edward Eliot, 3rd Earl of St Germans
- Blanche Vere Guest (1847–1919), who married Edward Ponsonby, 8th Earl of Bessborough (1851–1920).

Guest died in 1852 and was buried in an iron coffin under a red granite slab in the local St John's Church, which had been built for him in 1827.

After his death, his widow married Charles Schreiber (1826–1884) in 1855. Schreiber was an academic who had been Ivor's tutor in 1852. He was known for being a fine arts collector and Conservative Party politician who sat in the House of Commons between 1865 and 1884.

=== Descendants ===
Among his many grandchildren were: Edward Ponsonby, the 8th Earl of Bessborough, brothers Granville (1867–1942) and Montague Eliot (1870–1960), who became the 7th and 8th Earls of St Germans, respectively. There was also Frances Guest (1869–1957), known as Lady Chelmsford, who married Frederic Thesiger, 1st Viscount Chelmsford, who served as Viceroy of India, Ivor Churchill Guest (1873–1939), who became 1st Viscount Wimborne, Christian Henry Charles Guest (1874–1957), a Liberal Member of Parliament "MP", Frederick "Freddie" Edward Guest (1875–1937), another Liberal MP, and Oscar Montague Guest (1888–1958), who was both a Liberal, and later, a Conservative MP.

Parliament of the United Kingdom
Preceded by Peregrine Cust; Samuel Crawley	Member of Parliament for Honiton; 1826–1831; With: Harry Baines Lott 1826–1830; Sir George Warrender, Bt 1830–1831	Succeeded by Harry Baines Lott; Sir George Warrender, Bt
New constituency	Member of Parliament for Merthyr Tydfil; 1832–1852	Succeeded by Henry Bruce
Baronetage of the United Kingdom
New creation	Baronet (of Dowlais); 1838–1852	Succeeded by Ivor Guest
