= Frances Thesiger, Viscountess Chelmsford =

British aristocrat and Vicereine of India

The Right Honourable The Viscountess Chelmsford CI GBE
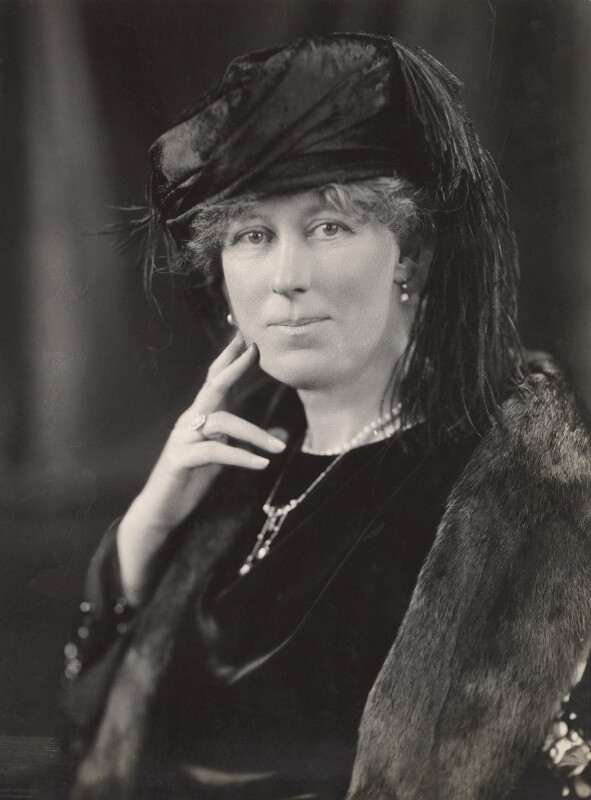
- Portrait of the Lady Chelmsford, c. 1910

Viceregal-Consort of India
- In office 14 April 1916 – 2 April 1921
- Monarch: George V
- Governor-General: The Lord Chelmsford
- Preceded by: The Lady Hardinge of Penshurst
- Succeeded by: The Countess of Reading

Personal details
- Born: 22 March 1869 Mayfair, London, England
- Died: 24 September 1957 (aged 88) Westminster, London, England
- Spouse: Hon. Frederic Thesiger (m. 1894)
- Relations: Guest family Lord Randolph Churchill (uncle); Winston Churchill (cousin)
- Parent(s): Ivor Guest, 1st Baron Wimborne; Lady Cornelia Spencer-Churchill

Frances Charlotte Thesiger, Viscountess Chelmsford, CI, GBE (née Guest; 22 March 1869 – 24 September 1957), styled as the Lady Chelmsford until 1921, was a British aristocrat and Vicereine of India.

Born in Mayfair, London, she was the eldest daughter of wealthy industrialist Ivor Guest, 1st Baron Wimborne and Lady Cornelia Spencer-Churchill, the daughter of the 7th Duke of Marlborough. Through her mother she was a first cousin of Prime Minister Sir Winston Churchill. She was made a Dame Grand Cross of the Order of the British Empire in 1917 and was also invested with the Imperial Order of the Crown of India.

== Early life ==
She was born at 12 Upper Brook Street, London, the eldest daughter of nine children born to Lady Cornelia Henrietta (née Spencer-Churchill; 1847–1927) and Ivor Bertie Guest, a wealthy industrialist created the first Baron Wimborne in 1880. On her mother's side she was a scion of the Dukes of Marlborough; Lord Randolph Churchill, father of Winston Churchill, was her maternal uncle. On her father's side she descended from the industrialist Guest family, whose fortune derived from the Dowlais Ironworks. The union of her parents was not considered a good one for her mother, Lady Cornelia; the Guests were seen as parvenus by some members of the more-established gentry. Her family were nonetheless prominent in the exclusive London society; they owned London property in Mayfair and St James's, as well as estates in Dorset. She had nine siblings, including politicians Henry Guest and Oscar Guest.

Her beauty, charm, and good-heritage attracted many suitors for her debut in 1887. However, her younger sister had married before her, leading to speculation that Frances was choosy with suitors, wishing instead for a genuine love-match. On 29 January 1894, it was announced that Frances was engaged to Sir Egbert Sebright. However, several weeks later the engagement dissolved.

On 28 July 1894 at St George's, Hanover Square, she married the Hon. Frederic John Napier Thesiger, heir to the barony of Chelmsford.

== In Australia ==
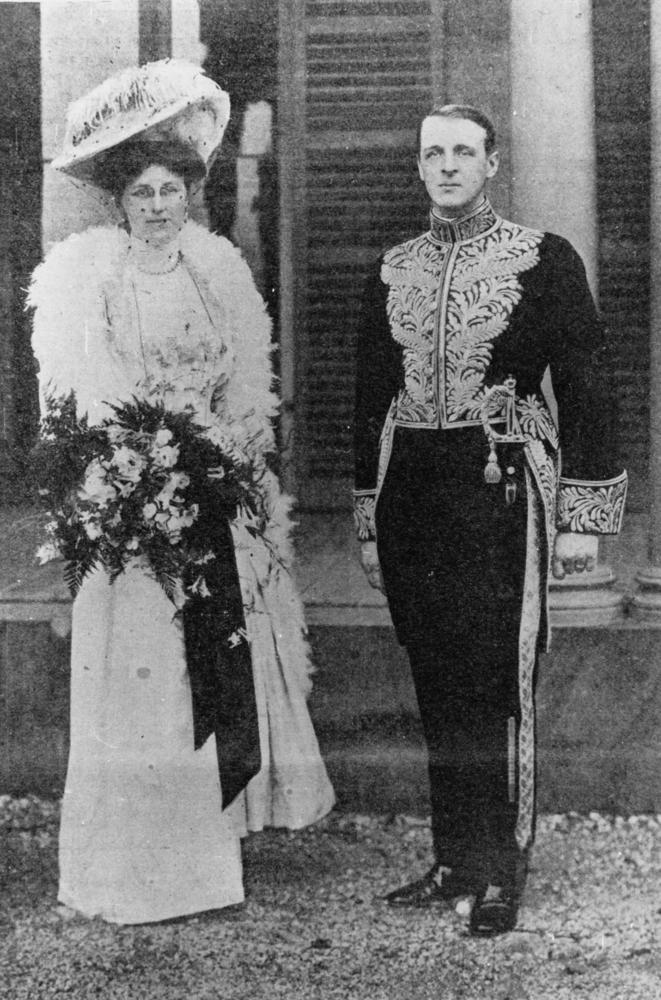
The Chelmsfords in Brisbane, 1905

In April 1905, Thesiger succeeded his father as the third Baron Chelmsford, and in July was appointed Governor of Queensland, Australia. Lord and Lady Chelmsford arrived in Brisbane in November, with Chelmsford being sworn in. His term was to be dominated by conflict between the Legislative Council and the Legislative Assembly and the emergence of three evenly divided parties in the lower house. Lord Chelmsford was appointed Governor of New South Wales in 1909, being based in Sydney, a position he retained until 1913.

In Australia, Lady Chelmsford involved herself in charitable works, being particularly concerned with hospitals, educating women, and improving the welfare of women and children generally. Both her and her husband were also interested in playing music, specifically the Bechstein. Lady Chelmsford was responsible for importing 500 rose trees from France to be installed at Government House. The Chelmsford left Australia in March 1913, returning to England.

== In India ==
Upon the outbreak of war in 1914, Lord Chelmsford joined his regiment as a Captain and was posted to India, with Lady Chelmsford accompanying him. In March 1916, he was appointed to the esteemed position of Viceroy and Governor-General of India. The pair were very pleased with the appointment, especially upon discovering that the income and allowances of the Viceroy was £60,000 per year (equivalent to £6 million present-day).

In India she again involved herself in charitable causes, this time funding the Red Cross and supporting soldiers welfare in India.

On 15 June 1921, her husband was elevated as Viscount Chelmsford, and she was then-on thus styled as the Viscountess Chelmsford.

== Family ==
Lord and Lady Chelmsford had six children:

- Hon. Joan Frances Vere Thesiger (1 August 1895 – 15 May 1971)
- Lt. Hon. Frederic Ivor Thesiger (17 October 1896 – 1 May 1917)
- Hon. Anne Molyneux Thesiger (17 December 1898 – 10 August 1973)
- Hon. Bridget Mary Thesiger (7 August 1900 – 18 June 1983)
- Andrew Charles Gerald Thesiger, 2nd Viscount Chelmsford (25 July 1903 – 27 September 1970)
- Hon. Margaret St. Clair Sydney Thesiger (7 May 1911 – 1 July 1991)

Her eldest son, and heir to the Chelmsford Viscountcy, Frederic Ivor Thesiger, a Lieutenant in the Royal Field Artillery, was killed in action in May 1917 during the Mesopotamian campaign. He is buried in the Baghdad (North Gate) War Cemetery.

== Later life ==
After the death of her husband in 1933, she retired to live with her family in Canford Magna, Dorset. She died in London on 24 September 1957 and was buried at the Canford Magna Parish Church.
