= Lady Charlotte Guest =

English aristocrat (1812–1895)

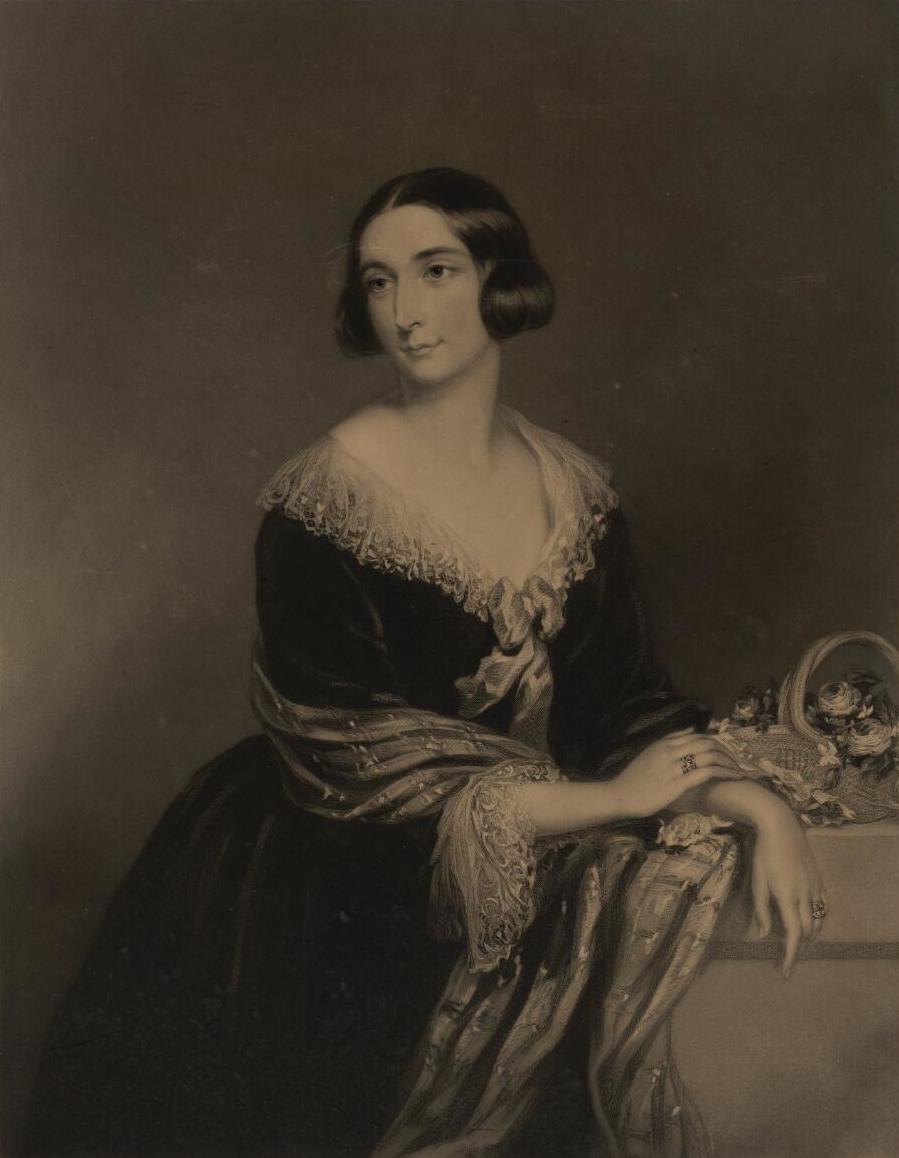
- Portrait of Lady Charlotte Guest
- Born: Charlotte Elizabeth Bertie; 19 May 1812; Uffington, Lincolnshire, England
- Died: 15 January 1895 (age 82); Canford Manor, Dorset, England
- Occupations: Translator, businesswoman
- Spouses: John Josiah Guest, 1st Baronet (m. 1833; died 1852) Charles Schreiber (m. 1855; died 1884)
- Children: Charlotte Maria Guest; Ivor Bertie Guest; Katharine Gwladys Guest; Thomas Merthyr Guest; Montague Guest; Augustus Frederick Guest; Arthur Edward Guest; Mary Enid Evelyn Guest; Constance Rhiannon Guest; Blanche Guest
- Parent(s): Albemarle Bertie, 9th Earl of Lindsey; Charlotte Susannah Elizabeth Layard

Lady Charlotte Elizabeth Guest (née Bertie; 19 May 1812 – 15 January 1895), later Lady Charlotte Schreiber, was an English aristocrat who is best known as the first publisher in modern print format of the Mabinogion, the earliest prose literature of Britain. Guest established the Mabinogion as a source literary text of Europe, claiming this recognition among literati in the context of contemporary passions for the chivalric romance of King Arthur and the Gothic movement. The name Mabinogion used for the book was derived from a mediaeval copyist's error, already established in the 18th century by William Owen Pughe and the London Welsh societies.

As an accomplished linguist and the wife of a prominent Welsh ironmaster John Josiah Guest, she became a leading figure in the study of literature and the wider Welsh Renaissance of the 19th century. With her second husband, Charles Schreiber, she became a well known Victorian collector of porcelain; their collection is held in the Victoria and Albert Museum. She also created major collections of fans, games, and playing cards, which she gave to the British Museum. She was noted as an international industrialist, pioneering liberal educator, philanthropist, and elite society hostess.

== Early life ==
Lady Charlotte was born on 19 May 1812 at Uffington House in Uffington, Lincolnshire, the daughter of Albemarle Bertie, 9th Earl of Lindsey (1744–1818), and his second wife Charlotte Susanna Elizabeth Layard. She was christened Lady Charlotte Elizabeth Bertie. When she was six years old she suffered the loss of her father and during this year she was also caught in a house fire, from which she escaped. Her mother later remarried the Reverend Peter William Pegus (her first cousin), whom Charlotte reportedly disliked. She had two younger brothers and half-sisters. With time her mother slowly began to change from being an active woman to someone who retreated with illness. It is during this time that Charlotte began to take over for her mother in the running of the house.

It appears that she particularly enjoyed the refuge of the garden and with time she developed a dislike for being kept inside. Furthermore, at the age of nineteen she had continually to apologise for her family's actions. Ever since she was young she had a keen interest in politics and keenly expressed her views on topics that she had formed an opinion on. Charlotte showed a great aptitude for languages and literature. She taught herself Arabic, Hebrew, and Persian as well as studying Latin, Greek, French and Italian with her brothers' tutor. From looking at Lady Charlotte's life it is clear that her life was structured, as she was someone who rose early and apparently despised laziness.

Lady Charlotte's upbringing met the standards that society had held for her class. She learnt various skills, such as singing and dancing. As she came from an aristocratic family, the Berties, attending public school was not a success; some members of the family were bullied, for example Lindsey, who was swiftly removed from school, his education thenceforth being supplied by a tutor. Lady Charlotte did not have any close friends and if any she was closest to the O’Brien sisters.

== Career ==
=== Dedication to education ===
The first national working-class movement in the world, Chartism, helped Lady Charlotte understand that there was a need for "closer involvement in practical work for the people of Dowlais". Many of the wealthier people during the 19th century helped develop educational and leisure facilities for the people who worked for them: this is something that the Guests also did. With the backing of her cousin, Henry Layard, Lady Charlotte eventually focused her efforts on providing education in Dowlais. Despite her sex, a great disadvantage in that day in public affairs, Lady Charlotte managed to propagate her ideas and implement many of her educational developments.

Lady Charlotte was very dedicated in her work and routinely visited schools. In addition, she used to give out prizes and otherwise encourage students. She also supplied schools with materials for needlework and arranged for the purchase of requisite teaching supplies. She supported schools in Swansea and Llandaff, as well as Dowlais. The Dowlais school is described as "probably the most important and most progressive not only in the industrial history of South Wales, but of the whole of Britain during the nineteenth century."

Her dedication to trying to improve education can also be seen in the library that was constructed in the mid-1840s. Originally there was a subscription fee of 1s 6d, however this was later changed in 1853 and it became a public library.

=== Dowlais Ironworks ===
Dowlais Ironworks was a major 19th-century ironworks located near Merthyr Tydfil, one of the four main ironworks around Merthyr, the other three being Cyfarthfa, Plymouth and Penydarren Ironworks.

Charlotte Guest took assisted management of Dowlais Ironworks after the death of her husband in 1852. She along with G. T. Clark and Edward Divett would become executors and trustees of the Ironworks. As a result of this Guest would be sole trustee while a widow but she remarried in 1855 to Charles Schreiber and de facto control fell to Clark although there are reports that she gave up running the iron works, and instead travelled and assembled an impressive ceramics collection.

=== Publications ===
PDF file of Lady Charlotte Guest's translation of the Mabinogion (1st version; 1838 and 1845)

Guest arrived in Wales already expert in seven languages. She learnt Welsh, and associated with leading literary scholars of the Abergavenny Welsh Society, notably including Thomas Price, and John Jones (Tegid) who supported and encouraged her in her work. Villemarqué had an initially cordial relationship with her about Breton sources, but then plagiarised her work. She translated several mediaeval songs and poems, then in 1837 she began on the Mabinogion. John Jones (Tegid) borrowed a copy of the Llyfr Coch Hergest manuscript for her from Judge Bosanquet, who had originally commissioned him to transcribe a copy when Tegid was a young scholar at Oxford. The first tale Charlotte translated from Tegid's transcription was "The Lady of the Fountain" or "Owain," which was well received when published in 1838.

Some characters from the tales had been profiled in William Owen Pughe's Myvyrian Archaiology of Wales. Pughe published a translation of the first episode of Pwyll, from the First Branch, in 1795, and again in 1821. He made a complete translation of all the tales, but the work was unpublished at his death in 1835. Guest did not rely on Pughe's translations, though she did use a Welsh dictionary Pughe had completed in 1803.

The Charlotte Guest Mabinogion became the first translation of the material to be published in modern print format. It was published in seven volumes between 1838 and 1845, with the first volumes dedicated to Guest's favourite Arthurian material. In 1849 the work was republished in three volumes: Volume I contained the Welsh Romances Owain, Peredur, and Geraint and Enid; Volume II contained Culhwch ac Olwen and The Dream of Rhonabwy. Volume III contained the Four Branches of the Mabinogi and Taliesin. Geraint and Enid in Volume I was the basis for Alfred, Lord Tennyson's two poems about Geraint in the Idylls of the King.

The seven volume series 1838–45, and the three volume set 1849, were all bilingual, presenting Tegid's transcribed Welsh text, and Guest's English translation. They included copious scholarly footnotes, mainly in English, totalling 145 pages in all. They were lavishly produced, with full illustrations, and gold tooled, leather covers. All volumes were published simultaneously in Llandovery, Wales by the Tonn Press, and by Longmans of London.

The next edition in 1877 was the English translation only, and this became the standard edition which was to become so very well known.

=== The name 'Mabinogion' ===
The name Mabinogion for these stories is often incorrectly thought to begin with Guest but it was already in use in the late 18th century cf. Pughe 1795 and his circle in the London Welsh Societies. The name was derived from a mediaeval copyist mistake where a single instance of the word mabynnogyon looks like a plural for the term 'mabinogi;' but 'mabinogi' is already a Welsh plural.

The meaning Mabinogi is obscure, but it clearly roots in the word 'mab' for son, child, young person: this is to be seen in the naming convention 'son of' in genealogies. Beyond that scholars have no consensus. As a title the 'Mabinogi' properly applies to only the Four Branches of the Mabinogi. These are not just four stories, as each contains at least three tales, but they are formally referred to as four tales out of the eleven which comprise the standardised Mabinogion collection, post-Guest.

Guest's own collection included twelve stories, adding in the Hanes Taliesin which is subsequently omitted by other scholars, as it is not found in the Llyfr Coch Hergest, or the Llyfr Gwyn Rhydderch, like the rest.

In 2007 American scholar John K. Bollard concluded his analysis of the Mabinogi as follows:

'The question for the audience of The Mabinogi is not "Did these things really happen here?" The more important question is "How carefully do we attend to the tales set in these places?" There is another world contiguous with, and informing, the one we experience – the world of myth, of narrative and story. Its landscape is our landscape, and though its rules may be somewhat different, the characters who inhabit those tales face the same sort of very human choices and decisions that we must also learn to make.'

== Personal life ==
During her life she had many suitors. At one point Herbert Marsh was considered as a possible suitor. She made friends with the learned men of the time and almost married the future Prime Minister Benjamin Disraeli (1804–1881), who was attracted to her intelligence. Her first love is believed to have been Augustus O’Brien whom she had met at the age of fourteen, something which was later described as the best day of her life. However, this relationship was doomed as her mother was entirely against her daughter being bound to the son of a local squire, even going as far as to claim that she would sooner see her daughter in a grave than married to Augustus.

=== First marriage ===
After the brief flirtation with Disraeli, she escaped her unhappy home life through marriage in 1833, at the age of twenty-one. Her husband, John Josiah Guest, was a prominent industrialist and ironmaster (owner of the Dowlais Iron Company, the largest of its day) and the first member of parliament from the town of Merthyr Tydfil, Wales. He was much older than she was; 49 to her 21. The couple married on 29 July 1833 and moved to a newly built mansion in Dowlais in Merthyr Tydfil. Though Guest was member of parliament for Merthyr, extremely wealthy, and of good family, he was much lower in status than his aristocratic wife, which caused her significant social strain. Despite this they remained married until his death in 1852, and Charlotte was mainly very happy in her marriage. She bore ten children:

- Charlotte Maria Guest (1834–1902), who married Richard Du Cane (d. 1904), brother of Edmund Frederick Du Cane.
- Ivor Bertie Guest (1835–1914), who married Lady Cornelia Henrietta Maria Spencer-Churchill (1847–1927), daughter of John Spencer-Churchill, 7th Duke of Marlborough
- Katharine Gwladys Guest (1837–1926), who married the Reverend Frederick Cecil Alderson (d. 1907), son of Sir Edward Hall Alderson
- Thomas Merthyr Guest (1838–1904), who married the writer and philanthropist Lady Theodora Grosvenor (1840–1924), daughter of Richard Grosvenor, 2nd Marquess of Westminster
- Montague John Guest (1839–1909), a Liberal politician, who never married.
- Augustus Frederick Guest (1840–1862), who died aged 21.
- Arthur Edward Guest (1841–1898), a Conservative politician, who married Adeline Mary Chapman (d. 1931)
- Mary Enid Evelyn Guest (1843–1912), who married Sir Austen Henry Layard (1817–1894).
- Constance Rhiannon Guest (1844–1916), who married Hon. Charles George Cornwallis Eliot (1839–1901), youngest son of Edward Eliot, 3rd Earl of St Germans
- Blanche Vere Guest (1847–1919), who married Edward Ponsonby, 8th Earl of Bessborough (1851–1920).

She took an enthusiastic interest in her husband's philanthropic activities on behalf of the local community, and they built pioneering schools for their workers, as well as piping in clean water for their cottages when this was still a very new technology. She was increasingly trusted by her husband as his assistant at the ironworks, and she acted as his representative for the company. She translated technical documents from French. John Guest was created a baronet in 1838, due in no small part to his wife's social engineering. The decline of Josiah's health meant that Charlotte spent more time administering the business and took it over completely following his death in 1852. She negotiated strikes and a slump, and stood up to other foundry owners, stabilising the business until in 1855 she could hand on the business to her eldest son, Ivor, and the manager G. T. Clark.

Guest, with her contemporary and friend Lady Llanover, was a patron of the arts in Wales. Her Enid was a literary influence on Tennyson, and her theories and sources influenced European artists, poets and writers. She published, promoted and translated of the books of The Mabinogion, with her 1877 single volume edition of the English translation being adopted as part of the Everyman series in 1902. Further editions were published during the 20th century. In 2004 the work was published online by the Gutenberg project, and in 2008 Colin Jones published recordings with music. Modern translations of The Mabinogion include John Bollard's series (2007–2010) and that of Sioned Davies (2008).

=== Second marriage ===
In 1855, Charlotte married Charles Schreiber (10 May 1826 – 31 March 1884) a classical scholar who had recently been her sons' tutor, and who was 14 years her junior. The difference in status and age created a major social scandal and set her apart from many of her former close friends such as Augusta Hall. However, with her experienced political support, her new husband became a member of parliament for Cheltenham and later Poole. They spent many years travelling in Europe collecting ceramics which she bequeathed to the Victoria and Albert Museum. She also collected fans, board games and playing cards, which were later donated to the British Museum.

Despite the death of her first husband, Charlotte maintained an active role in implementing his philanthropic aims for the estate at Canford Manor. In 1867 the first pair of estate cottages for workers were built. They were to be the first 2 of 111 cottages known as Lady Wimborne Cottages after Lady Cornelia Guest, daughter-in-law to Charlotte and wife of Ivor Guest, 1st Baron Wimborne, who continued Charlotte's project for the construction of the estate cottages.

In 1884, Guest was again widowed, but lived on to an advanced age. In her last few years, she became blind, but used the last of her eyesight to knit scarves for cabbies. She was finally unable to continue the journal she had written almost without a break since she was 10 years old. On 15 January 1895, she died at the age of 82 at Canford Manor in Dorset.

=== Descendants ===
Among her many grandchildren were: Edward Ponsonby, the 8th Earl of Bessborough, Granville Eliot (1867–1942) and Montague Eliot (1870–1960), who became the 7th and 8th Earls of St Germans, respectively. There was also Frances Guest (1869–1957), known as Lady Chelmsford, who married Frederic Thesiger, 1st Viscount Chelmsford, who served as Viceroy of India, Ivor Churchill Guest (1873–1939), who became 1st Viscount Wimborne, Christian Henry Charles Guest (1874–1957), a Liberal member of parliament "MP", Frederick "Freddie" Edward Guest (1875–1937), another Liberal MP, and Oscar Montague Guest (1888–1958), who was both a Liberal, and later, a Conservative MP. Among her other descendants are the American Guests (the late socialite C. Z. Guest was the wife of one of these), the Earls of Bessborough, the Viscounts Chelmsford, and others.

== Publications ==
- Schreiber, Charlotte, Lady. Playing Cards of Various Ages and Countries Volume III Swiss, Swedish, Russian, Polish, Italian, Spanish, and Portuguese (London, England; John Murray, 1895)
- Schreiber, Charlotte. Lady Charlotte Schreiber's Journals: Confidences of a Collector of Ceramics and Antiques throughout Britain, France, Holland, Belgium, Spain, Portugal, Turkey, Austria and Germany from the year 1869–1885. (London and New York: John Lane, 1911), edited by Montague John Guest.
