= Lady Wimborne Bridge =

Bridge in Poole, Dorset, England

Coordinates: 50.79055°N 1.97448°W

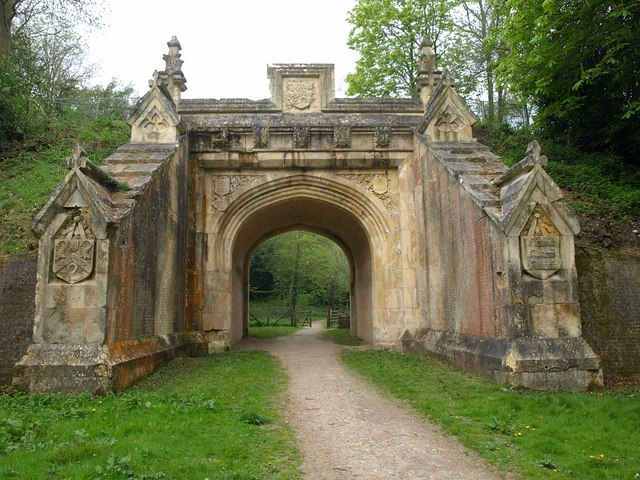
The bridge in 2010

The Lady Wimborne Bridge (London and South Western Railway Bridge 77) is a former railway bridge built in 1853, and now a listed building. Its highly ornate design reflects the power of landowners over British railway companies in the mid-nineteenth century. Built shortly after the railway came to the town of Wimborne in Dorset, England, it is now a Grade II listed structure.

== Design ==
Although the Southampton and Dorchester Railway through Wimborne was authorized before Sir John Guest, 1st Baronet of Dowlais (one of the greatest iron founders of the time, his ironworks being situated in Dowlais, South Wales) took ownership of Canford Manor in 1846, later negotiations with the company (of which Guest was a director) led after his death in 1852 to the replacement of the original structure with another over what became the carriage drive to the house. The bridge was until recently attributed in the on-line version of the official listing to Charles Barry Jr, the highly regarded English architect of the mid to late 19th century, and eldest son of Sir Charles Barry, who was responsible for the design for the Lady Wimborne Cottages, serving as workers cottages on the Canford Estate. However the latter, renowned as the architect of the Palace of Westminster, was responsible for the extensive alterations to the manor around the time of the bridge’s construction and was in fact the designer.

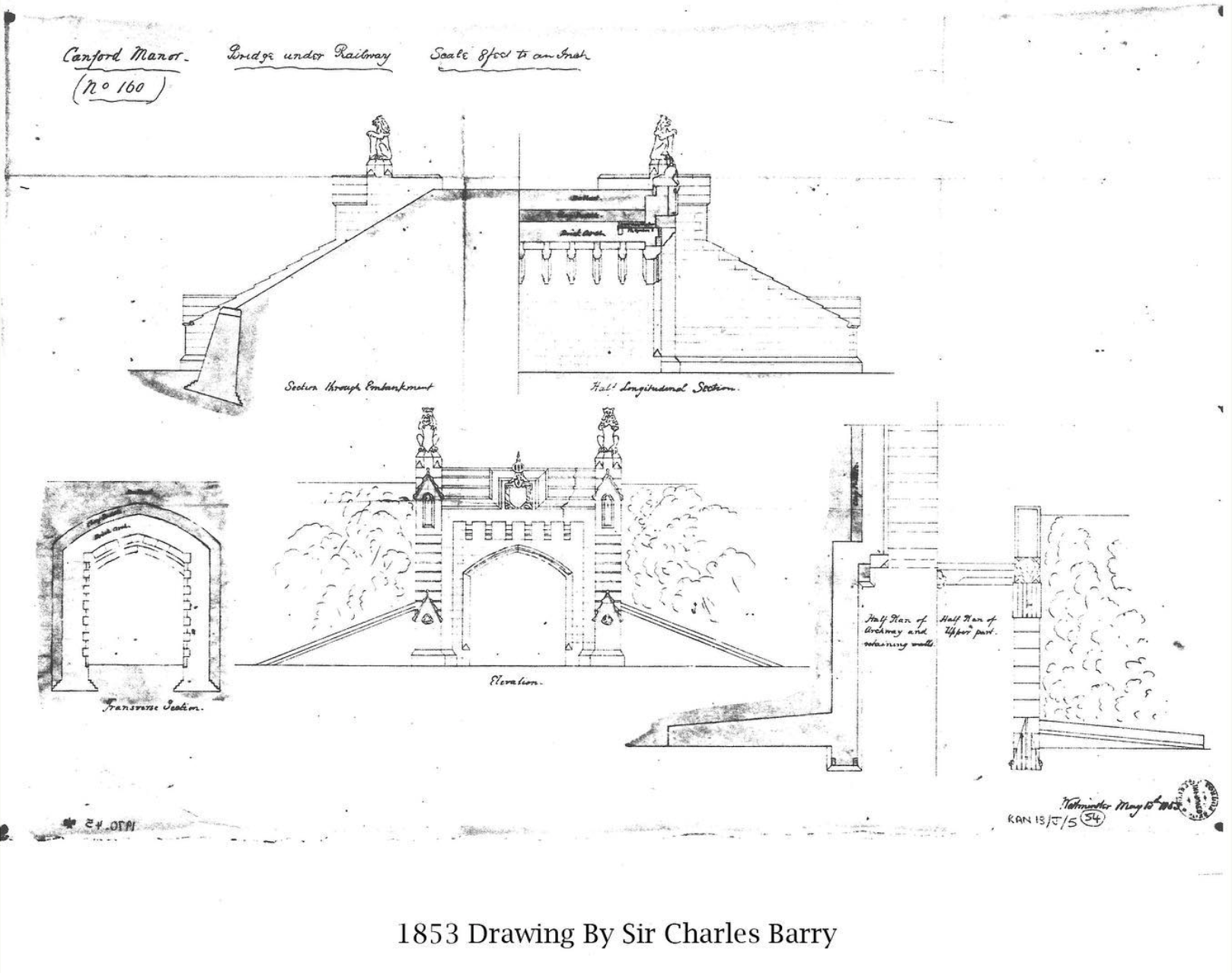
1853 plan drawn by Sir Charles Barry for the Lady Wimborne Bridge 77

Its features are typical of the highly ornate gothic style, adorned with pinnacles, crocketting, crests and the heraldry of Sir (Josiah) John Guest. The original plans drawn by Sir Charles Barry in 1853, however, were partially simplified by the time of construction.

== History ==
The bridge is probably named after the first Lady Wimborne, Cornelia Guest (1847-1927), although it was her mother-in-law, Lady Charlotte Guest, Sir John's wife, who was responsible for financing the bridge's construction around 1853-54, after her husband died. It is not clear when the bridge became known by its present name: contemporary newspaper reports from the 1850s do not identify it in this way.

The last train passed over the bridge on 3 May 1977, following the recovery of equipment from Wimborne station which had just closed to all traffic.

Although the railway is long gone, steep steps allow pedestrians to climb the embankment to the top and follow a footpath to the river or, in the other direction, along an informal path towards the site of the former Wimborne Junction and engine shed. Unfortunately the informative interpretation board located on the ground by the bridge has been removed.
