= Viscount Wimborne =

Viscountcy in the Peerage of the United Kingdom

Viscountcy of Wimborne
- Azure on a Chevron Or between three Swan's Heads erased proper as many Crosses Moline Sable
- Creation date: 15 June 1918
- Created by: King George V
- Peerage: Peerage of the United Kingdom
- First holder: Ivor Churchill Guest, 2nd Baron Wimborne
- Present holder: Ivor Mervyn Vigors Guest, 4th Viscount Wimborne
- Heir apparent: the Hon. Ivor N.G.I. Guest
- Subsidiary titles: Baron Wimborne; Baron Ashby St Ledgers; Baronet of Dowlais
- Status: Extant

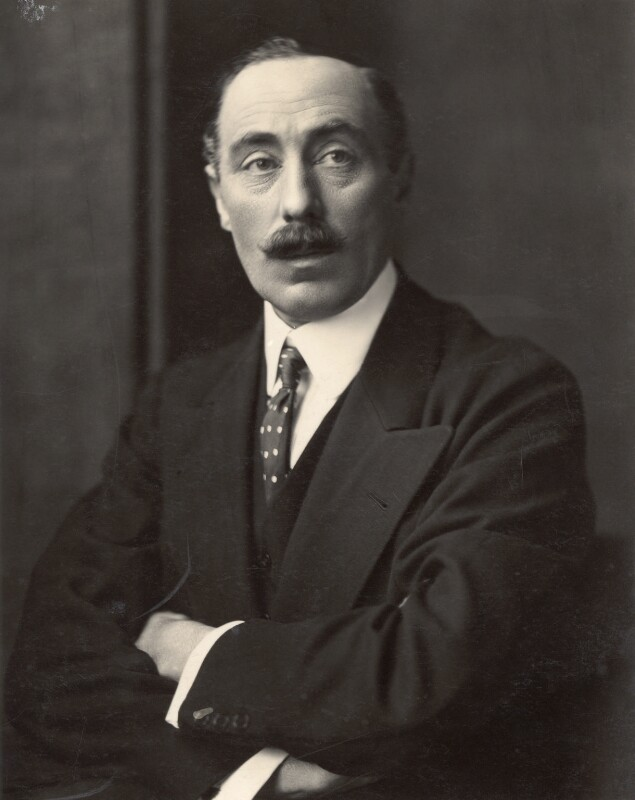
Ivor Guest, 1st Viscount Wimborne

Viscount Wimborne, of Canford Magna in the County of Dorset, is a title in the Peerage of the United Kingdom.

== History ==
The title was created in 1918 for Ivor Guest, 2nd Baron Wimborne. The Guest family descends from the engineer and businessman John Josiah Guest. On 14 August 1838, he was created a baronet, of Dowlais in the County of Glamorgan, in the Baronetage of the United Kingdom. He was succeeded by his eldest son, the second Baronet. In 1880, he was created Baron Wimborne, of Canford Magna in the County of Dorset, in the Peerage of the United Kingdom. On his death, the titles passed to his eldest son, the second Baron. In 1910, four years before he succeeded his father, he had been raised to the Peerage of the United Kingdom in his own right as Baron Ashby St Ledgers, of Ashby St Ledgers in the County of Northampton. Upon his retirement as Lord Lieutenant of Ireland in 1918, he was further honoured when he was made Viscount Wimborne, of Canford Magna in the County of Dorset, in the Peerage of the United Kingdom. His son, the second Viscount, represented Breconshire in the House of Commons. As of 2018, the titles are held by the latter's grandson, the fourth Viscount, who succeeded his father in 1993.

Several other members of the Guest family have also gained distinction. Montague Guest, third son of the first Baronet, was a Liberal Member of Parliament. Frederick Edward Guest, Henry Guest and Oscar Guest, younger sons of the first Baron, were all prominent politicians. Also, Lady Charlotte Guest was the second wife of the first Baronet.

In 1867, the first Baron bought a large house at 22 Arlington Street in London, which remained the family's London residence until 1947.

== Guest baronets, of Dowlais (1838) ==
- Sir John Josiah Guest, 1st Baronet (1785–1852)
- Sir Ivor Bertie Guest, 2nd Baronet (1835–1914) (created Baron Wimborne in 1880)

== Barons Wimborne (1880) ==
- Ivor Bertie Guest, 1st Baron Wimborne (1835–1914)
- Ivor Churchill Guest, 2nd Baron Wimborne (1873–1939) (created Baron Ashby St Ledgers in 1910; created Viscount Wimborne in 1918)

== Viscounts Wimborne (1918) ==
- Ivor Churchill Guest, 1st Viscount Wimborne (1873–1939)
- Ivor Grosvenor Guest, 2nd Viscount Wimborne (1903–1967)
- Ivor Fox-Strangways Guest, 3rd Viscount Wimborne (1939–1993)
- Ivor Mervyn Vigors Guest, 4th Viscount Wimborne (born 1968)

The heir apparent is the present holder's son, the Hon. Ivor N.G.I. Guest (born 2016).

Baronetage of the United Kingdom
Preceded by Kyrle-Money baronets	Guest baronets of Dowlais; 14 August 1838	Succeeded by Bellew baronets
