= Geoffrey Garratt =

British journalist (1888–1942)

Major Geoffrey Theodore Garratt MBE (1888 – 28 April 1942) was a British farmer, journalist and political activist.

== Life ==
He was born at The Grange, Little Tew Oxfordshire, son of clergyman the Reverend Charles Francis Garratt and his wife Agnes Mary (nee Percival), Garratt was educated at Rugby School and then attended Hertford College, Oxford. In 1912, he joined the Indian Civil Service, based in Bombay. During World War I he was commissioned into the Indian Army Reserve of Officers in 1915, and from 1916 was on active service with the 21st Cavalry, taking part in the Mesopotamian campaign.

After the end of the war, Garratt returned to the civil service, but he resigned in 1922, unhappy about the amount of money being spent on prestigious projects while poverty was widespread in the country. He found work as the Berlin correspondent of the Westminster Gazette.

Garratt returned to the UK in 1923, settling in Cambridgeshire. There, he took up farming, and also became politically active. He joined the Independent Labour Party, and stood unsuccessfully for the Labour Party in Cambridgeshire at the 1924, 1929 and 1931 United Kingdom general elections, and then The Wrekin at the 1935 United Kingdom general election, and in the 1937 Plymouth Drake by-election. In 1925, he was elected to Cambridgeshire County Council. Although his farming was largely a hobby, he has been described as "almost... the party's official spokesman to the farming community".

In the 1930s, Garratt worked for the Manchester Guardian, covering Indian nationalism, the Second Italo-Ethiopian War, and the Winter War. From 1937 to 1938 he spent his time working in eastern Spain for Spanish Relief. Based on his experiences, he wrote Mussolini's Roman Empire in 1938, and also edited The Legacy of India.

During World War II, Garratt served in the Pioneer Corps with the rank of Major. He was placed in charge of a group of German volunteers doing war work for the British government. On April 28, 1942, aged 53, he was killed along with 18 other men in an explosion at the Defensible Barracks overlooking Pembroke Dock. He is buried at Llanion Military Cemetery in the town]. There is a plaque dedicated to him at the Imperial War Museum.

The award of his MBE appeared in the London Gazette 14th April 1942 under the following heading:

The KING has been graciously pleased to give orders for the following appointments to the Most Excellent Order of the British Empire, in recognition of conspicuous gallantry in carrying out hazardous work in a very brave manner: —

To be Additional Members of the Military Division of the said Most Excellent Order:—

Lieutenant (temporary Captain) Geoffrey Theodore Garrart (135713), Pioneer Corps (Teignmouth, Devon).

The citation for the award (extracted from file WO 373/67/319 held at the National Archives) reads:

“On the 5th November 1941, an officer of the Pioneer Corps was accidentally killed whilst searching for unmarked mines in a minefield. With complete disregard for personal danger, Captain Garratt entered the minefield, which was covered with long grass and extremely dangerous, and brought out the officer’s body.”
