= 1937 Plymouth Drake by-election =

UK Parliamentary by-election

← 1935	15 June 1937	1945 →

Constituency of Plymouth Drake
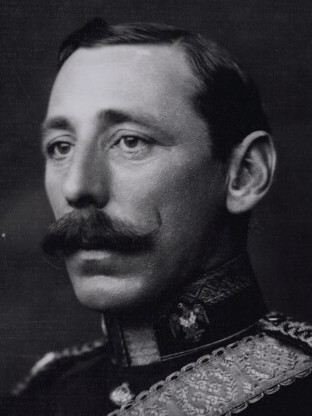
	First party	Second party
		Lab
Candidate	Henry Guest	Geoffrey Garratt
Party	Conservative	Labour
Popular vote	15,778	11,044
Percentage	58.82%	41.18%
MP before election
Frederick Guest
Conservative
Elected MP
Henry Guest
Conservative

The 1937 Plymouth Drake by-election was held on 15 June 1937. The by-election was held due to the death of the incumbent Conservative MP, Frederick Guest. It was won by the Conservative candidate Henry Guest, an elder brother of Frederick.

Plymouth Drake by-election, 1937
Party	Candidate	Votes	%	±%
Conservative	Henry Guest	15,778	58.82	
Labour	Geoffrey Garratt	11,044	41.18	
Majority		4,734	17.66	
Turnout		26,822		
Conservative hold		Swing		
