= St John's Church, Dowlais =

Church in Dowlais, Wales

Coordinates: 51.7614991°N 3.3543569°W

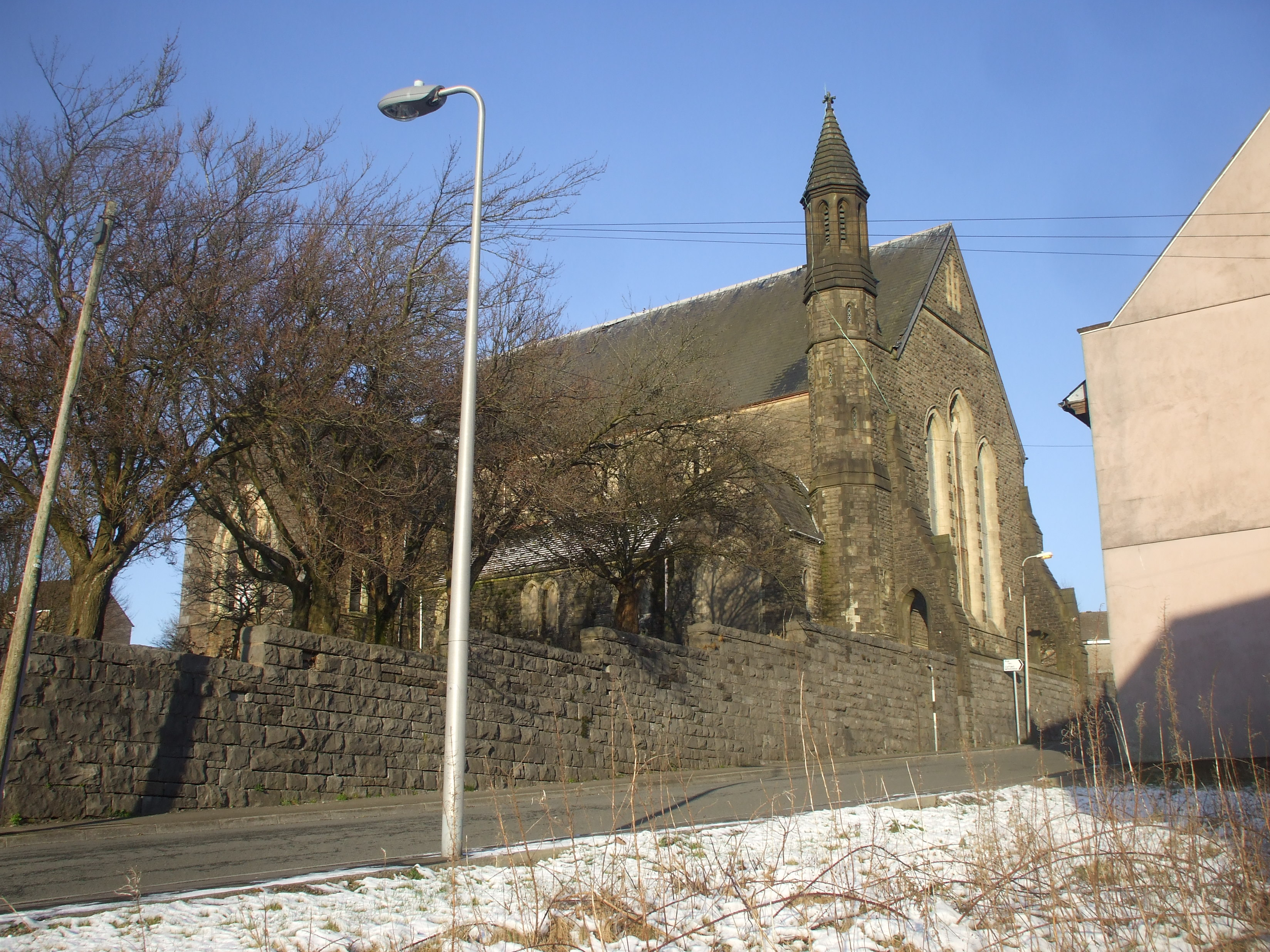
St John's Church (2012)

St John's Church is a defunct Grade II listed church in the village of Dowlais, near Merthyr Tydfil in Wales.

The church was built in 1827 for local ironworks manager Sir John Josiah Guest, at a cost of £3000. It was gradually completely rebuilt later in the century, in a Gothic style, finishing with the main nave and aisle in 1893/4. Sir John (d. 1852) was buried in an iron coffin in the chancel under a red granite slab.

The church ultimately closed in 1997. In early 2015, it was listed for sale at an initial price of £50,000. It was subsequently earmarked for £400,000 of Welsh Government grants to support its repair and redevelopment.
