= Arthur Guest =

British politician (1841–1898)

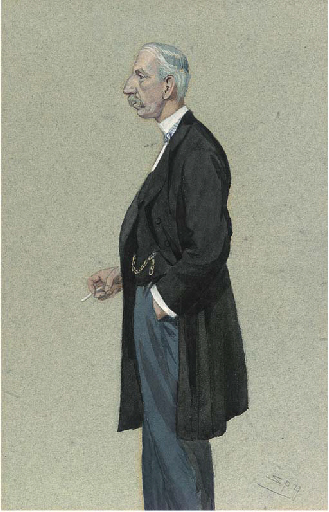
- Guest as caricatured by Spy (Leslie Ward) in Vanity Fair, August 1896
- Born: 7 November 1841; England
- Died: 17 July 1898 (aged 56)
- Occupation: Politician
- Spouse: Adeline Mary
- Parent(s): Sir Josiah Guest, 1st Baronet; Lady Charlotte Bertie

Arthur Edward Guest (7 November 1841 – 17 July 1898), was a British Conservative politician.

== Background ==
Guest was the fifth son of Sir Josiah Guest, 1st Baronet, and Lady Charlotte Elizabeth, daughter of Albemarle Bertie, 9th Earl of Lindsey. Ivor Guest, 1st Baron Wimborne, and Montague Guest were his elder brothers.

== Political career ==
Guest entered Parliament for Poole in 1868, a seat he held until 1874. He unsuccessfully contested Cardiff in 1880 and Southampton on 23 May 1888.

== Family ==
Guest married Adeline Mary Chapman, daughter of David Barclay Chapman, in 1867. Their daughter Mildred Mansel (1868–1942) went on to marry Colonel John Delalynde Mansel and was a suffragette.

Guest died in July 1898, aged 56. Adeline Mary married as her second husband Cecil Maurice Chapman in 1899. She died in January 1931.

Parliament of the United Kingdom
| Preceded by Henry Danby Seymour; Charles Waring (representation reduced to one member 1868) | Member of Parliament for Poole; 1868–1874 | Succeeded by Charles Waring |
