= Cornelia Guest, Baroness Wimborne =

British aristocrat (1847–1927)

The Right Honourable Baroness Wimborne OBE
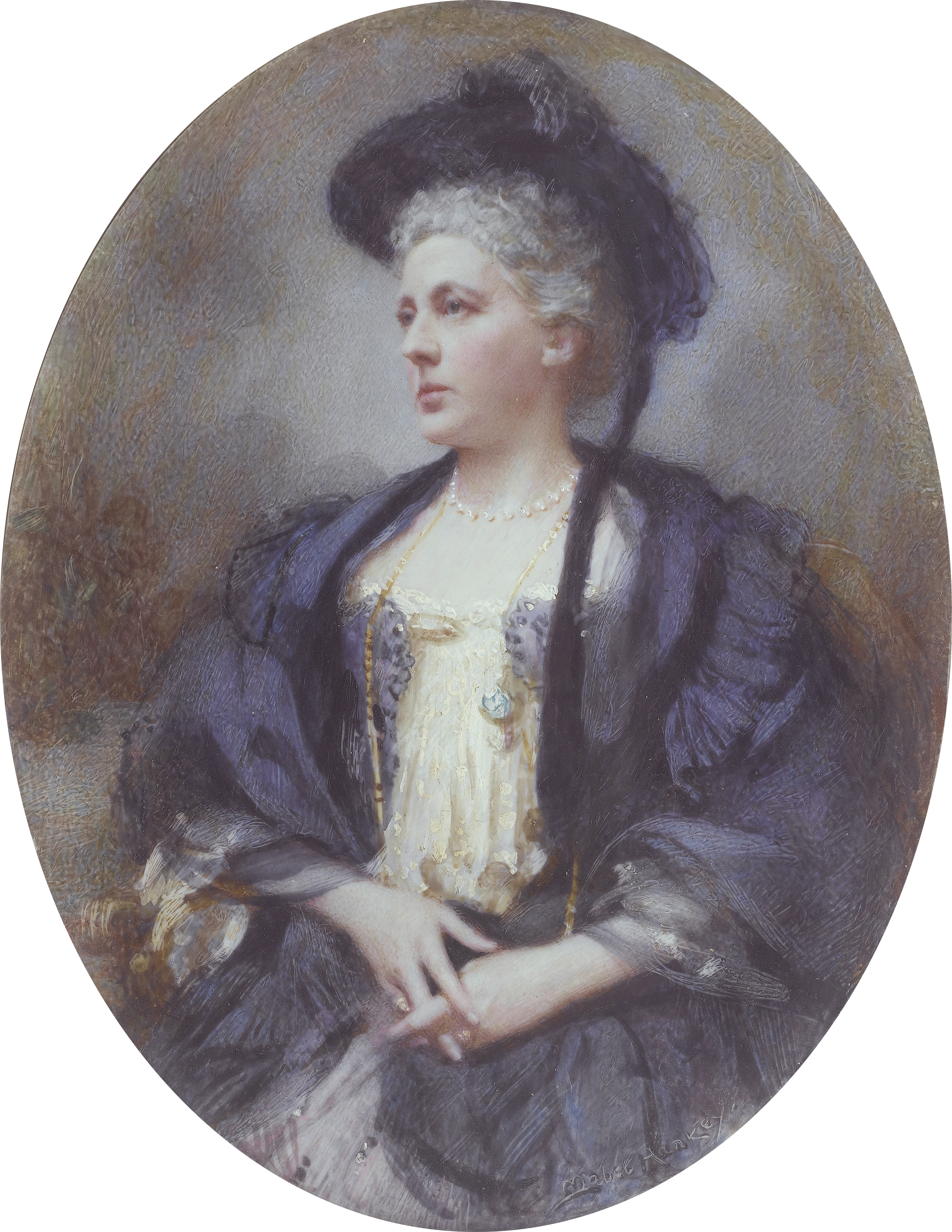
- portrait by Mabel Lee Hankey, 1905
- Born: Cornelia Henrietta Maria Spencer-Churchill; 17 September 1847; Mayfair, City of Westminster
- Died: 22 January 1927 (aged 79); Mayfair, City of Westminster
- Buried: Canford Magna Parish Church, Dorset
- Spouse: Ivor Guest (m. 1868)
- Issue: 7, including: Frances Guest; Ivor Guest, 1st Viscount Wimborne; Henry Guest; Freddie Guest; Oscar Guest
- Father: John Spencer-Churchill, 7th Duke of Marlborough
- Mother: Frances Spencer-Churchill, Duchess of Marlborough

Cornelia Henrietta Maria Guest, Baroness Wimborne (née Spencer-Churchill; 17 September 1847 – 22 January 1927), was a British aristocrat and landowner. She was the wife of Ivor Guest, 1st Baron Wimborne, and the mother of their six children. She was an aunt of the future Prime Minister of the United Kingdom Winston Churchill. As a philanthropist, she is remembered as being the namesake of the historic Lady Wimborne Cottages and the Lady Wimborne Bridge in Dorset.

== Biography ==
Cornelia Spencer-Churchill was born to the politician John Spencer-Churchill, 7th Duke of Marlborough, and his wife Lady Frances Vane, into the aristocratic Spencer-Churchill family. Her mother was of Anglo-Irish nobility. Cornelia was their eldest daughter and the third born of their eleven children.

In 1868, Cornelia married Ivor Guest, which was seen for him as an elevation in status for a Baronet. In 1880, he was created Baron Wimborne, and she became Baroness Wimborne.

Cornelia, helped oversee the philanthropic project of building estate cottages to improve the living conditions of workers in and around Poole, Dorset. Although the project was started by her mother-in-law, Charlotte Guest, Cornelia was responsible for the building of the majority of them, which are now known as 'Lady Wimborne Cottages'. After the passing of the Elementary Education Act 1870, the Guests sponsored the building of schools at Hampreston, Hamworthy and Broadstone. They also contributed towards the founding of churches in Parkstone and Broadstone.

In the 1918 Birthday Honours, she was made Officer of the Order of the British Empire (OBE) for her work as founder and President of the Dorset Guild of Workers.

== Issue ==
Their children included the following:

- Frances Guest (1869–1957), later known as Lady Chelmsford, who married Frederic Thesiger, 1st Viscount Chelmsford, who served as Viceroy of India.
- Ivor Churchill Guest (1873–1939), who married the Hon. Alice Grosvenor (1880–1948).
- Christian Henry Charles Guest (1874–1957), who married the Hon. Frances Lyttelton (1885–1918).
- Frederick "Freddie" Edward Guest (1875–1937), who married Amy Phipps (1873–1959), daughter of American industrialist Henry Phipps.
- Rosamond Ridley, Viscountess Ridley (1878–1947), who married Matthew White Ridley, 2nd Viscount Ridley.
- Lionel George William Guest (1880–1935), who married Flora Bigelow (former wife of Charles S. Dodge), daughter of U.S. Ambassador John Bigelow.
- Oscar Montague Guest (1888–1958), who married Kathleen Paterson (b. 1903).

== See also ==
- Baron Wimborne
