= Ivor Guest, 1st Baron Wimborne =

British industrialist (1835–1914)

The Right Honourable The Lord Wimborne DL
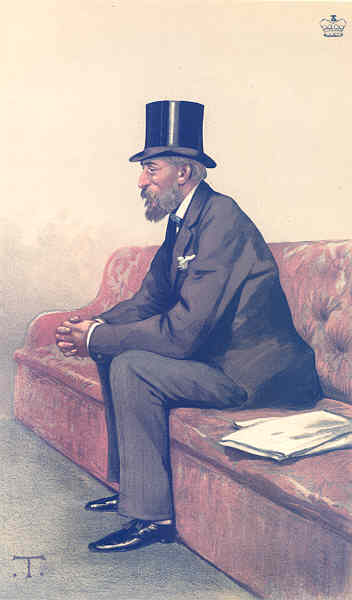
- "Tennis" (as depicted by Théobald Chartran in Vanity Fair, 23 September 1882)
- Born: 29 August 1835; Dowlais, Merthyr Tydfil, Wales
- Died: 22 February 1914 (aged 78); Canford Manor, Dorset, England
- Buried: Canford Magna Parish Church
- Family: Guest
- Spouse: Lady Cornelia Spencer-Churchill (m. 1868)
- Issue: Frances Thesiger, Viscountess Chelmsford; Ivor Guest, 1st Viscount Wimborne; Henry Guest; Frederick Guest; Oscar Guest
- Father: Sir John Josiah Guest
- Mother: Lady Charlotte Bertie
- Occupation: Industrialist

Ivor Bertie Guest, 1st Baron Wimborne, 2nd Baronet, DL (29 August 1835 – 22 February 1914) was a British industrialist and a member of the prominent Guest family.

== Early life ==
Ivor Bertie Guest was born at Dowlais, near Merthyr Tydfil, the son of Lady Charlotte Guest, translator of the Mabinogion, and Sir John Josiah Guest, 1st Baronet, owner of the world's largest iron foundry, Dowlais Ironworks. His middle name (Bertie) was from his mother's family, the Earls of Abingdon, descended from a Tudor courtier who married the Dowager Duchess of Suffolk (herself suo jure Baroness Willoughby de Eresby).

His siblings included Montague Guest, a Liberal politician, Arthur Edward Guest, a Conservative politician, Charlotte Maria Guest, Mary Enid Evelyn Guest, who married Austen Henry Layard, and Blanche Guest, who married Edward Ponsonby, 8th Earl of Bessborough.

Guest was educated at Harrow School in Middlesex, and he went on to gain a Master of Arts degree in 1856 from Trinity College, Cambridge.

== Titles ==
Following his father's death in 1852, Guest succeeded to his father's baronetcy. In 1880, he was elevated to the peerage as Baron Wimborne, of Canford Magna in the County of Dorset, on Disraeli's initiative.

== Career ==
Guest was commissioned a cornet in the Dorsetshire Yeomanry on 20 April 1858 and was promoted to lieutenant on 11 March 1867.

He held the office of High Sheriff of Glamorgan in 1862 and was the mayor of Poole from 1896 to 1897. In 1879, he rebuilt the real tennis court at Canford. He was lampooned in Vanity Fair as "the paying Guest".

From 1874 on, he stood unsuccessfully for election to the House of Commons as a Conservative, contesting Glamorganshire at the 1874 general election, Poole at a by-election in May 1874, and Bristol at a by-election in 1878 and at the 1880 general election. However, following the tariff reform by Chamberlain, he seceded from the Conservative party and sat in the House of Lords as a Liberal.

He was President of the Dean Close Memorial School from 1902, and a Deputy Lieutenant of Dorset.

== Marriage and issue ==
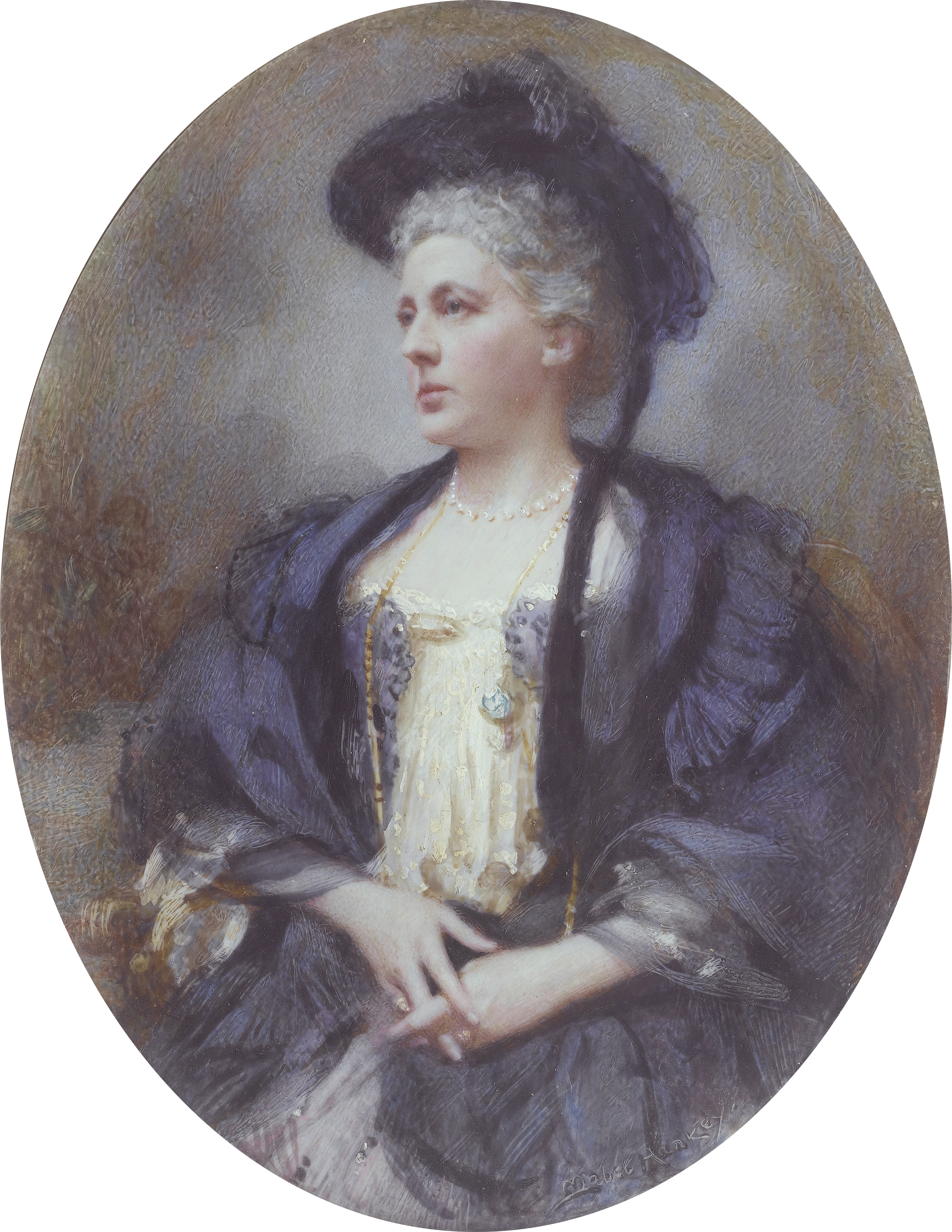
Lady Wimborne by Mabel Lee Hankey, 1905

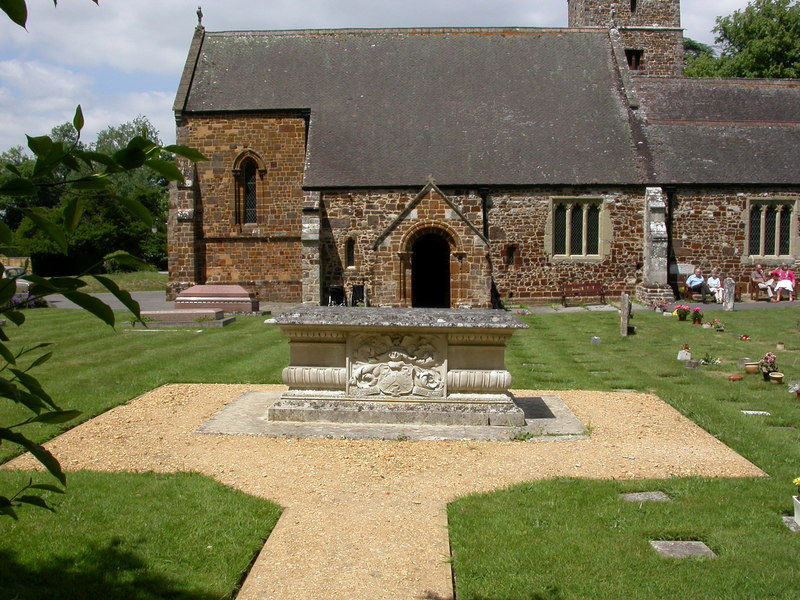
Guest's tomb at Canford Magna Parish Church

On 25 May 1868, Guest married Lady Cornelia Henrietta Maria Spencer-Churchill (1847–1927). She was the daughter of John Spencer-Churchill, 7th Duke of Marlborough, thus making Guest an uncle-by-marriage of Winston Churchill, later the prime minister of the United Kingdom.

Their children included the following:

- Frances Guest (1869–1957), later known as Lady Chelmsford, who married Frederic Thesiger, 1st Viscount Chelmsford, who served as Viceroy of India.
- Ivor Churchill Guest (1873–1939), who married the Hon. Alice Grosvenor (1880–1948).
- Christian Henry Charles Guest (1874–1957), who married the Hon. Frances Lyttelton (1885–1918).
- Frederick "Freddie" Edward Guest (1875–1937), who married Amy Phipps (1873–1959), daughter of American industrialist Henry Phipps.
- Rosamond Ridley, Viscountess Ridley (1878–1947), who married Matthew White Ridley, 2nd Viscount Ridley.
- Lionel George William Guest (1880–1935), who married Flora Bigelow (former wife of Charles S. Dodge), daughter of U.S. ambassador John Bigelow.
- Oscar Montague Guest (1888–1958), who married Kathleen Paterson (b. 1903).

His wife Cornelia, helped oversee the philanthropic project of building estate cottages to improve the living conditions of workers in Dorset. Although begun by his mother, Charlotte Guest, Cornelia was responsible for the building of the majority, which as a result are known as 'Lady Wimborne Cottages' after her role.

He died on 22 February 1914 at Canford Manor in Dorset and was succeeded by his eldest son, Ivor Churchill Guest, 2nd Baron Wimborne, 1st Baron Ashby St Ledgers, who was later created Viscount Wimborne. His will was proved in April 1914, provisionally at £250,000.

== Residences ==
In 1867, Guest bought at auction "Hamilton House", located at 22 Arlington Street in the St. James's district of the City of Westminster in central London, from the widow of William Hamilton, 11th Duke of Hamilton. As the house had traditionally been renamed with the title of each peer who owned it, upon receiving his title in 1880, Guest renamed the house as "Wimborne House".

Wimborne acquired the Highland sporting estate of Glencarron (Ross-shire) in the 1860s, building a Lodge (Alexander Ross / William Joass, c. 1868). He extended it with Glenuaig Estate, possibly 1871, together comprising 15,000 acres. On the opening of the "Dingwall and Kyle Railway" in 1870, Glencarron Lodge was provided with a private platform.

Peerage of the United Kingdom
New creation	Baron Wimborne; 1880–1914	Succeeded by Ivor Guest
Baronetage of the United Kingdom
Preceded by Josiah Guest	Baronet (of Dowlais); 1852–1914	Succeeded by Ivor Guest
