= Canford Magna Parish Church =

Church in Canford Magna, Dorset, England

Coordinates: 50.7889°N 1.9561°W

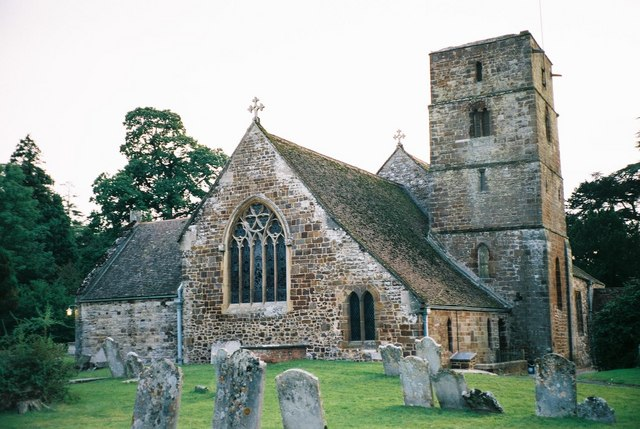
Canford Magna Parish Church

The Canford Magna Parish Church in Canford Magna, Dorset, England – possibly dedicated to St Augustine – is a mixture of Saxon, Norman and Mid Gothic architecture.

English Heritage have designated it a Grade I listed building.

== History ==
During late Saxon times, a small cruciform chapel was built, which is now the chancel.

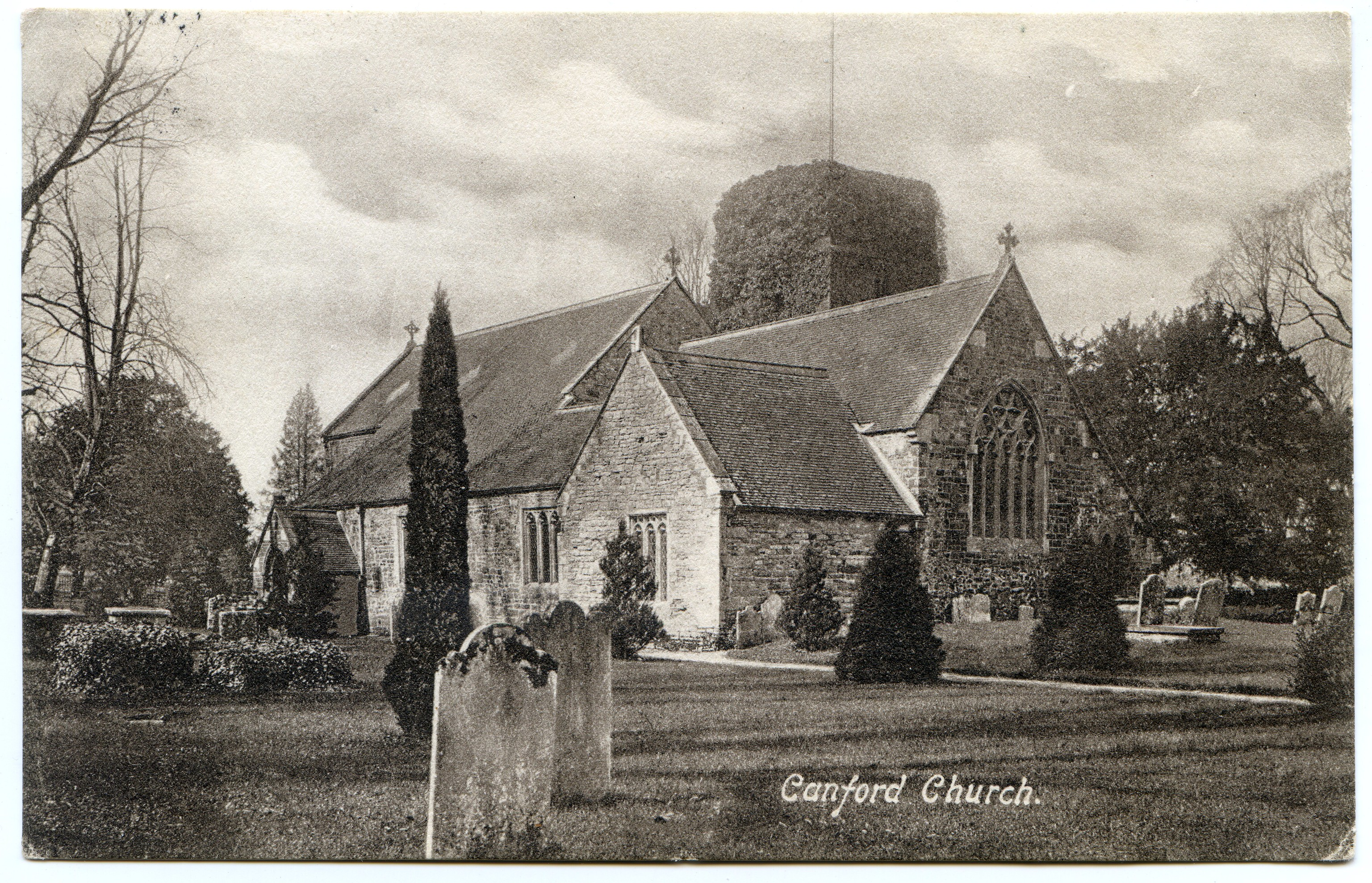
1908 Postcard of Canford Magna Parish Church

Between the 12th century and the Dissolution of the monasteries, the church was under the control of the monks at Bradenstoke Priory. This ended with the dissolution of the priory in January 1539.

During Norman times, the church was much expanded, and the north tower was added circa 1180 in a very unusual place – not far enough to the north to be considered a transept, as at Exeter Cathedral. The tower contains a ring of six bells, the back five of which are the last ring of bells out of the foundry of William Knight. The treble was added in 1897, to commemorate the Golden Jubilee of Queen Victoria. The back five bells are listed. The tenor weighs 1,088 pounds (494 kg) and strikes the note F♯.

In the 20th century, the church saw notable developments in British Evangelicalism. In 1971, John Collins, an evangelical minister took over leadership of the church. He was responsible for the creation of a new type of pastoral ministry in the church, reminiscent of the Oxford Group which established some 30 members as counsellors of the church.

== Interments ==
The ashes of Sir Austen Henry Layard (died 1894), archeologist and politician are interred in the cemetery of the church.

Ivor Guest, 1st Baron Wimborne, was buried in the churchyard in 1914. His wife Cornelia Guest, Baroness Wimborne was buried here in 1927.

Sir Walter Shaw, judge, chairman of the Shaw Commission, was buried here on 27 April 1937.

The churchyard also contains the grave of Ellis Gawler, a Royal Air Force Reserve serviceman killed in the Second World War.
