= Ivor Guest, 1st Viscount Wimborne =

British politician (1873-1939)

The Right Honourable The Viscount Wimborne KP PC
- Guest in 1906

Lord Lieutenant of Ireland
- In office 17 February 1915 – 9 May 1918
- Monarch: George V
- Prime Minister: H. H. Asquith; David Lloyd George
- Preceded by: The Earl of Aberdeen
- Succeeded by: The Viscount French of Ypres

Personal details
- Born: Ivor Churchill Guest; 16 January 1873 Wimborne House, Arlington Street, London
- Died: 14 June 1939 (aged 66) Wimborne House, Arlington Street, London
- Party: Conservative (until 1904); Liberal (from 1904)
- Spouse: Alice Grosvenor (m. 1902)
- Children: 3, including Ivor
- Parent(s): Ivor Guest, 1st Baron Wimborne; Lady Cornelia Spencer-Churchill
- Education: Trinity College, Cambridge

Ivor Churchill Guest, 1st Viscount Wimborne, KP, PC (16 January 1873 – 14 June 1939), known as Lord Ashby St Ledgers from 1910 to 1914 and as Lord Wimborne from 1914 to 1918, was a British politician and one of the last Lords Lieutenant of Ireland, serving in that position at the time of the Easter Rising.

== Background and education ==
He was the eldest son of Ivor Guest, 1st Baron Wimborne, and Lady Cornelia Henrietta Maria Spencer-Churchill, daughter of John Spencer-Churchill, 7th Duke of Marlborough. He was the elder brother of Frederick Guest, Oscar Guest and Henry Guest, and a first cousin of Winston Churchill. He was educated at Eton and Trinity College, Cambridge.

He was commissioned a lieutenant in the Dorset Yeomanry on 9 May 1896. Following the outbreak of the Second Boer War in late 1899, he volunteered for service and was appointed a lieutenant in the Imperial Yeomanry on 24 February 1900, leaving England for South Africa on the SS Manchester Merchant in early March. He was awarded the Queen's South Africa Medal with two clasps. After returning to the United Kingdom, he was promoted to captain on 18 January 1902.

== Political career, 1900–1915 ==
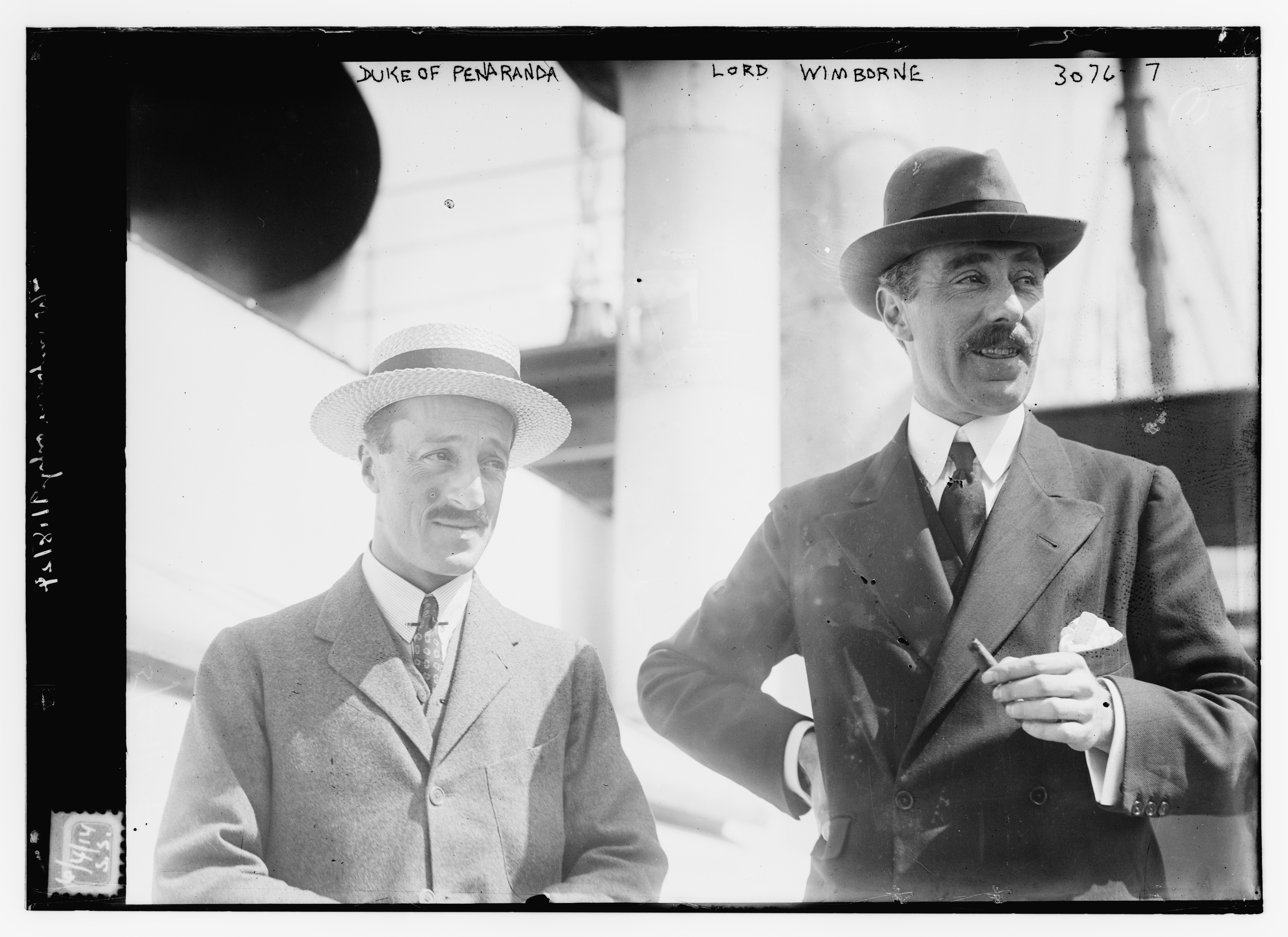
The Duke of Peñaranda and Lord Wimborne on 4 June 1914 in New York City for the 1914 Westchester Cup

He was elected unopposed to Parliament for Plymouth in a by-election in February 1900 (a seat he had unsuccessfully contested in 1898), as a Conservative, and retained his seat in the general election of 1900. In 1904, during the controversy within the Conservative Party over adopting protectionism, he and other members of his family followed Churchill into the Liberal Party in support of free trade.

He sat as an MP until 1910, when he was raised to the peerage as Baron Ashby St Ledgers, of Ashby St Ledgers in the County of Northampton, and became Paymaster General in the government of H. H. Asquith. He served as Paymaster General until 1912, and later served as a Lord in Waiting to King George V.

In 1914, he succeeded his father as Baron Wimborne. At the start of World War I, he was appointed to the staff of the newly formed 10th (Irish) Division under Lieutenant-general Sir Bryan Mahon at the Curragh Camp.

== Lord Lieutenant of Ireland, 1915–1918 ==
In February 1915, Wimborne was appointed Lord Lieutenant of Ireland in succession to Lord Aberdeen. At this time, the lord lieutenant was largely a ceremonial position; real power was in the hands of the Chief Secretary and the Under-Secretary. Determined to be more involved in decision-making, he was appointed Director of Recruiting in October 1915, heading up the new Department of Recruiting for Ireland. He insisted on being kept up to date on the state of the country, and had the Under-Secretary, Sir Matthew Nathan, send him police reports, details of prosecutions and recruitment figures.

On the weekend preceding the Easter Rising, following the capture of the German arms ship Aud and the arrest of Sir Roger Casement, Wimborne urged Nathan to order the arrest of a large number of rebel leaders. Nathan was unwilling to do so without the authorisation of the Chief Secretary, Augustine Birrell, who was in London. Before the authorisation was received, the Rising began on 24 April 1916. Wimborne proclaimed martial law in Dublin. Thereafter, the military took control. A new commander-in chief, General Sir John Maxwell, arrived in Ireland on 28 April and the rebels surrendered on 29 April. Wimborne initially refused to offer his resignation after the Rising. He resigned under pressure from the government but was re-appointed. In June 1916 he directed the establishment of the Property Losses (Ireland) Committee to assess the many insurance claims resulting from the Rising.

The Royal Commission on the 1916 Rebellion (the Hardinge commission) exonerated Wimborne of any blame for the Rising, saying that his position as lord lieutenant was "anomalous in quiet times and almost unworkable in times of crisis". He continued as Lord Lieutenant for another two years. On his retirement in 1918, he was created Viscount Wimborne, of Canford Magna in the County of Dorset.

== Marriage and issue ==
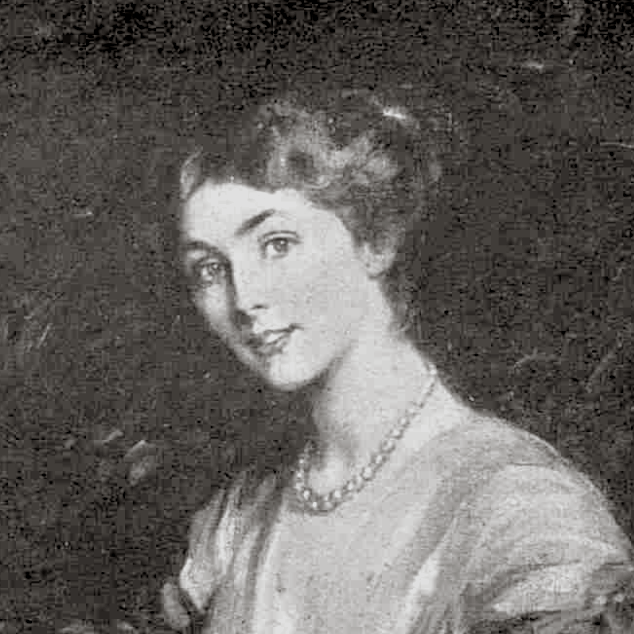
Alice Wimborne in 1914

On 10 February 1902, he married at St Peter's Church, Eaton Square, London, the Honourable Alice Grosvenor (1880–1948), daughter of Robert Grosvenor, 2nd Baron Ebury. They had one son, Ivor Guest, 2nd Viscount Wimborne, and two daughters, Rosemary and Cynthia.

By the 1930s, they were living separate lives, though remaining on the friendliest terms. From 1934 until her death Alice was linked with the composer William Walton. Wimborne died in June 1939, aged 66, at Wimborne House in Arlington Street, London, the house in which he was born. He was succeeded by his only son, Ivor. Lady Wimborne died in April 1948, aged 67.

Parliament of the United Kingdom
Preceded by Edward Clarke; Sigismund Mendl	Member of Parliament for Plymouth; 1900–1906; With: Sigismund Mendl to Oct 1900; Henry Duke 1900–1906	Succeeded by Thomas Dobson; Charles Mallet
Preceded by Edward Reed	Member of Parliament for Cardiff; 1906–1910	Succeeded by D. A. Thomas
Political offices
Preceded by The Lord Southwark	Paymaster General; 1910–1912	Succeeded by The Lord Strachie
Preceded by The Lord Willingdon	Lord-in-waiting; 1913–1915	Succeeded by The Lord Ranksborough
Preceded by The Earl of Aberdeen	Lord Lieutenant of Ireland; 1915–1918	Succeeded by The Viscount French
Peerage of the United Kingdom
New creation	Viscount Wimborne; 1918–1939	Succeeded by Ivor Guest
Preceded by Ivor Guest	Baron Wimborne; 1914–1939	Succeeded by Ivor Guest
New creation	Baron Ashby St Ledgers; 1910–1939	Succeeded by Ivor Guest
