= Freddie Guest =

British politician (1875–1937)

The Right Honourable Freddie Guest CBE DSO
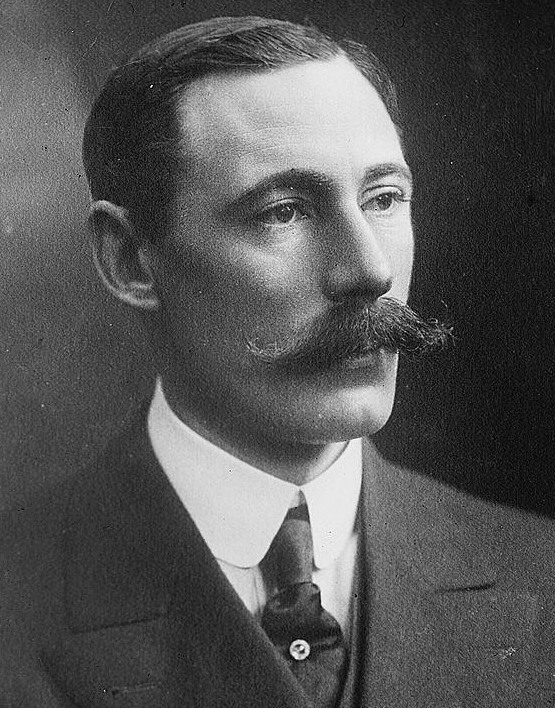

Secretary of State for Air
- In office 1 April 1921 – 19 October 1922
- Prime Minister: David Lloyd George
- Preceded by: Winston Churchill
- Succeeded by: Samuel Hoare

Government Chief Whip in the House of Commons; Parliamentary Secretary to the Treasury
- In office 2 March 1917 – 1 April 1921 Serving with Edmund FitzAlan-Howard
- Monarch: George V
- Prime Minister: David Lloyd George
- Preceded by: Neil Primrose
- Succeeded by: Charles McCurdy

Treasurer of the Household
- In office 21 February 1912 – 25 May 1915
- Prime Minister: H. H. Asquith
- Preceded by: William Dudley Ward
- Succeeded by: James Hope

Member of Parliament for Plymouth Drake
- In office 27 October 1931 – 28 April 1937
- Preceded by: James Moses
- Succeeded by: Henry Guest

Member of Parliament for Bristol North
- In office 29 October 1924 – 30 May 1929
- Preceded by: Walter Ayles
- Succeeded by: Walter Ayles

Member of Parliament for Stroud
- In office 6 December 1923 – 29 October 1924
- Preceded by: Stanley Tubbs
- Succeeded by: Frank Nelson

Member of Parliament for East Dorset
- In office 19 December 1910 – 15 November 1922
- Preceded by: Henry Guest
- Succeeded by: Gordon Hall Caine
- In office 15 January 1910 – 20 May 1910
- Preceded by: Charles Lyell
- Succeeded by: Henry Guest

Personal details
- Born: Frederick Edward Guest; 14 June 1875 London, England, UK
- Died: 28 April 1937 (aged 61) Sunbury-on-Thames, Surrey, UK
- Party: Conservative (Before 1904, 1930–1937)
- Other political affiliations: Liberal (1904–1916, 1923–1928); Coalition Liberal (1916–1922); National Liberal (1922–1923); Independent Liberal (1928–1930)
- Spouse: Amy Phipps (m. 1905)
- Children: Winston Frederick Churchill Guest; Raymond R. Guest; Diana Guest Manning
- Parents: Ivor Guest (father); Cornelia Spencer-Churchill (mother)
- Relatives: Ivor Guest (brother); Henry Guest (brother); Oscar Guest (brother); Winston Churchill (cousin)
- Education: Winchester College

Military service
- Allegiance: United Kingdom
- Branch/service: British Army
- Years of service: 1894–1906; 1914–1917
- Rank: Captain
- Unit: East Surrey Regiment; 1st Life Guards
- Battles/wars: Mahdist War; Second Boer War; First World War
- Awards: Distinguished Service Order; Mentioned in Despatches; Legion of Honour (France)

Frederick Edward Guest, CBE, DSO (14 June 1875 – 28 April 1937) was a British politician best known for being Chief Whip of Prime Minister David Lloyd George's Coalition Liberal Party, 1917–1921. He was also Secretary of State for Air between 1921 and 1922. He won the bronze medal with the British polo team at the 1924 Summer Olympics in Paris.

== Early life ==
Frederick Edward Guest was born in London, the third son of Ivor Guest, 1st Baron Wimborne (1835–1914) and Lady Cornelia Spencer-Churchill (1847–1927). The Guest family had made its fortune in the iron and steel industry during the 18th and 19th centuries and had married into the aristocracy. The Wimbornes were Conservatives who had been friends of Benjamin Disraeli. His mother was the eldest daughter of John Spencer-Churchill, 7th Duke of Marlborough.

Guest's four brothers were also politically active, with Ivor Guest serving as 2nd Baron Wimborne, then 1st Viscount Wimborne, a junior minister, and Lord Lieutenant of Ireland. In addition, Henry Guest and Oscar Guest were Members of Parliament (MPs), while Lionel Guest (1880–1935) was a member of the London County Council. His sister Frances Charlotte Guest (1865–1957) was married to Frederic Thesiger, 1st Viscount Chelmsford, who served as Viceroy of India.

Guest was a first cousin of British Prime Minister Winston Churchill, Charles Spencer-Churchill, 9th Duke of Marlborough, and Henry Innes-Ker, 8th Duke of Roxburghe, as well as a nephew of Conservative politician Lord Randolph Churchill, George Spencer-Churchill, 8th Duke of Marlborough, and Lady Anne Emily Spencer Churchill, who was married to the 7th Duke of Roxburghe. His cousin, the 8th Duke of Roxburghe, was married to American heiress Mary Goelet, the only daughter of Ogden Goelet.

== Career ==
=== Education and military career ===
Educated at Winchester, Guest chose the military profession. He was commissioned as second-lieutenant in the Infantry militia, East Surrey Regiment, and promoted to lieutenant on 7 April 1894. After apprenticeship in the militia, Guest was on 15 May 1897 appointed an officer in the 1st Life Guards, and promoted to lieutenant in that regiment on 23 November 1898. He was sent to Egypt in 1899, and in late November that year was part of a Camel Corps during the operations leading to the defeat of the Khalifa (mentioned in despatches 25 November 1899). He served in South Africa during the Second Boer War from 1901, returning home in late June 1902, following the end of hostilities. Back in the United Kingdom, he returned to a regular posting with his regiment in September 1902. He was decorated for bravery, and rose to captain before retiring from active duty in 1906.

=== Political career ===
In 1904, during the controversy within the Conservative Party over adopting protectionism, Guest and other members of his family followed his cousin and close friend, Winston Churchill, into the Liberal Party in support of free trade — and perhaps also to accelerate their political careers. In 1906 Guest became private secretary to Churchill, by then a junior minister in Sir Henry Campbell-Bannerman's Liberal government. Guest attempted three times to enter the House of Commons before winning the vote in the East Dorset seat in the January 1910 general election. Although he remained unseated because of election irregularities by his constituency agent, he was reelected in December 1910. Known in the political world as "Freddie Guest," he was a popular backbencher, became a Liberal Party whip in 1911, in the same year was elected a charter member of the cross-bench Other Club of political insiders, and was appointed Treasurer of the Household in 1912.

When the First World War began in August 1914, Guest returned to active service as aide-de-camp to Field Marshal Sir John French, commander of the British Expeditionary Force in France. Guest performed confidential missions for French, liaising with the War Office and with political leaders. In 1916 Guest served in the East African theatre of war and was awarded the Distinguished Service Order. After being invalided out of the army following serious illness, Guest resumed his political career. In May 1917 he joined Lloyd George's Coalition government as joint Patronage Secretary of the Treasury – effectively chief whip for the Coalition Liberals. On 3 December 1917 Guest sent Lloyd George a 14-page memo stating that although only around a third of Liberal MPs were staunch supporters of his predecessor H. H. Asquith, the time was not yet right to oust him from the Liberal leadership.

Guest was appointed to the Privy Council in the 1920 New Year Honours, entitling him to the style "The Right Honourable", and in 1921 was promoted to Secretary of State for Air, a post he held until the Coalition fell from power in October 1922. In the general election of November 1922 Guest lost his seat but in 1923 was returned for Stroud, then in 1924 for Bristol North.

After being deselected by his local Liberal party in 1928, he stood as an Independent Liberal in the 1929 election losing to the official Liberal candidate. He would later rejoin the Conservative Party in 1930, winning as a Conservative for Plymouth Drake in 1931 and remaining in this position until his death.

=== Elections contested ===
==== UK Parliament elections ====
Date of election	Constituency	Party	Votes	%	Result
1910 (Jan)	East Dorset	Liberal	6,957	51.6	Elected
1910 (Dec)	East Dorset	Liberal	6,811	52.1	Elected
1918	East Dorset	Coalition Liberal	11,944	73.4	Elected
1922	East Dorset	National Liberal	6,062	23.8	Not elected (3rd)
1923	Stroud	Liberal	15,179	53.2	Elected
1924	Bristol North	Liberal	17,799	59.1	Elected
1929	Bristol North	Independent Liberal	12,932	33.8	Not elected (2nd)
1931	Plymouth Drake	Conservative	25,063	66.4	Elected
1935	Plymouth Drake	Conservative	21,446	58.3	Elected

=== Polo ===
Olympic medal record

Men's Polo
Bronze medal – third place	1924 Paris	polo

Guest competed for Great Britain in polo at the 1924 Summer Olympics. The British Polo team received the bronze medal. He played alongside Frederick W. Barrett, Dennis Bingham and Kinnear Wise.

Guest can be found among the winners of the Roehampton Trophy. He would also lend horses to the English polo team for the International Polo Cup matches.

== Family and private life ==
On 28 June 1905, Guest married Amy Phipps (1872–1959), daughter of American industrialist Henry Phipps Jr. (1839–1930), at St George's, Hanover Square in London. Amy was prominent as a women's suffragist, philanthropist and aviation enthusiast and owned valuable property on Long Island. The couple were frequent visitors to the United States in the 1920s and 1930s. They had a daughter and two sons who became American citizens:

- Winston Frederick Churchill Guest (1906–1982), a polo player who married Helena Woolworth McCann and later Lucy Douglas Cochrane (1920–2003)
- Raymond R. Guest (1907–1991), the United States Ambassador to Ireland from 1965 to 1968, who married three times: to Elizabeth S. Polk, Ellen Tuck French Astor, and Princess Caroline Murat (1923–2012).
- Diana Guest Manning (1909–1994)

Apart from his political career he was an amateur motor racing driver and aeroplane pilot. In 1928 he was instrumental in founding the British airfield operator National Flying Services. In 1930, he became deputy master of the Guild of Air Pilots and Air Navigators, and master in 1932. He also played polo, was a big-game hunter in East Africa, and was a celebrated man-about-town in London and New York City society. Among his homes were Villa Artemis in Palm Beach, Florida and the former du Pont estate in Roslyn, New York. He was a member of the River and Links Clubs of New York and the Piping Rock Club in Long Island. He was also a friend of the Duke of Windsor, formerly King Edward VIII.

Guest died from cancer in 1937, at the age of 61.

== Footnotes ==
Parliament of the United Kingdom
Preceded by Charles Lyell	Member of Parliament for East Dorset; 1910–1910	Succeeded by Henry Guest
Preceded by Henry Guest	Member of Parliament for East Dorset; 1910–1922	Succeeded by Gordon Hall Caine
Preceded by Stanley Tubbs	Member of Parliament for Stroud; 1923–1924	Succeeded by Frank Nelson
Preceded by Walter Ayles	Member of Parliament for Bristol North; 1924–1929	Succeeded by Walter Ayles
Preceded by James Moses	Member of Parliament for Plymouth Drake; 1931–1937	Succeeded by Henry Guest
Political offices
Preceded by William Dudley Ward	Treasurer of the Household; 1912–1915	Succeeded by James Hope
Preceded by Edmund FitzAlan-Howard; Neil Primrose	Government Chief Whip in the House of Commons; Parliamentary Secretary to the Treasury; 1917–1921; With: Edmund FitzAlan-Howard	Succeeded by Leslie Wilson; Charles McCurdy
Preceded by Winston Churchill	Secretary of State for Air; 1921–1922	Succeeded by Samuel Hoare
Party political offices
Preceded by Neil Primrose	Coalition Liberal Chief Whip; 1917–1921	Succeeded by Charles McCurdy
