= Canford Magna =

Village in Dorset, England

Coordinates: 50.787°N 1.952°W

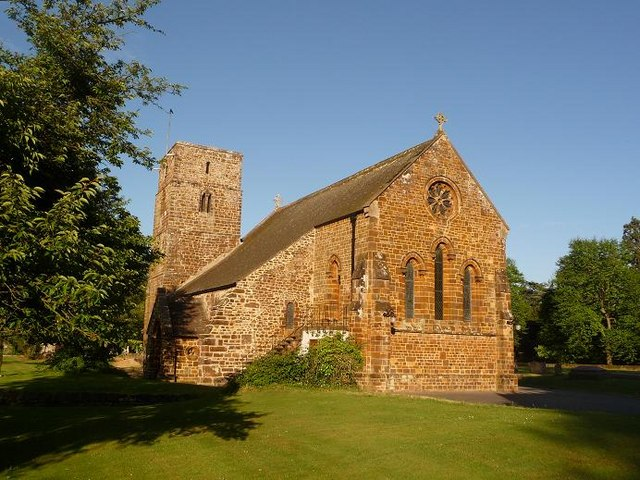
- Canford Magna parish church

- Location within Dorset
- Population
- Civil parish: Poole
- Unitary authority: Bournemouth, Christchurch and Poole
- Ceremonial county: Dorset
- Region: South West
- Country: England
- Sovereign state: United Kingdom
- Post town: WIMBORNE
- Postcode district: BH21
- Dialling code: 01202
- Police: Dorset
- Fire: Dorset and Wiltshire
- Ambulance: South Western
- UK Parliament: Mid Dorset and North Poole

Canford Magna is a village in the civil parish of Poole, in the Bournemouth, Christchurch and Poole district, in the ceremonial county of Dorset, England. The village is situated just south of the River Stour and lies between the towns of Wimborne Minster and Poole. The village was significantly developed by the Guest family of Canford Manor, featuring a mixture of thatch and brick buildings, now mostly serving as residences for teaching staff. The western edge of the village merges with the residential suburb of Merley and the village community of Oakley.

The village school was built in 1866 and now serves as the youth club for Canford and Merley.

== History ==
=== Development under the Guests ===
The new buildings were started in 1866, beginning with a school and mortuary chapel. Lady Charlotte Guest, of Canford Manor, had become heavily involved in the estate and had commissioned the construction of three blocks of terraced cottages. These were built between 1870 and 1872, embellished with gables, ornamental chimneys, lattice windows, and large ornamental door hinges. These became widely known as Lady Wimborne Cottages.

Cornelia Guest, Daughter-in-law of Lady Charlotte, also shared an interest in the estate cottages, constructing more across the estate in Ashington, Merley and Poole. She also commissioned the thatcher, John Hicks, to add rustic porches of oak branches and twigs to the existing terraced cottages. Hick's work and the architecture of Canford Village were captured in a series of drawings by the artist Barbara Jones which appeared in an article of The Architectural Review in 1944.

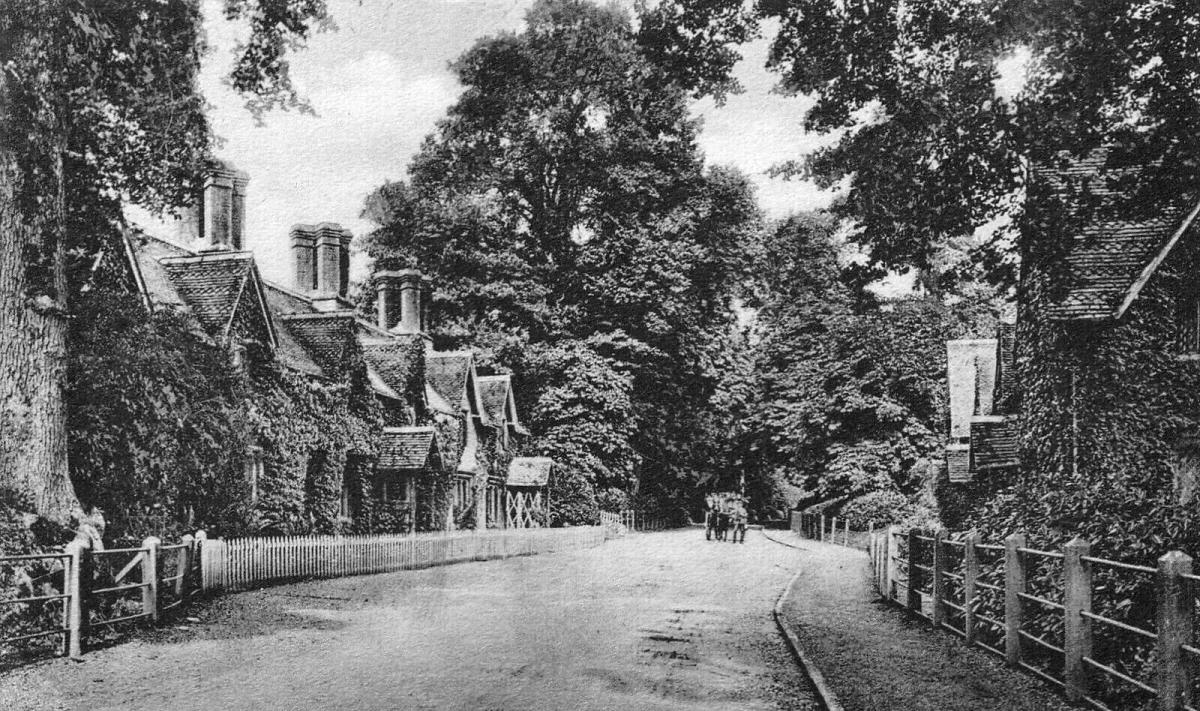
Terraced Lady Wimborne Cottages, (no. 45-49) built 1870

Under the First Lord Wimborne, and his wife Cornelia who inherited the manor in 1880, the work to convert Canford Magna into a model village was completed. The finished village had created such a stir that sightseers from Bournemouth travelled by horse drawn charabancs to view it. They arrived to trumpet fanfare and were taken around by guide well versed in the benefits of the model village. The favoured season for this tours was Autumn when the gables of the cottages were covered in scarlet Virginia creeper and the great chestnuts that lined the streets were in colour.

=== Later history ===
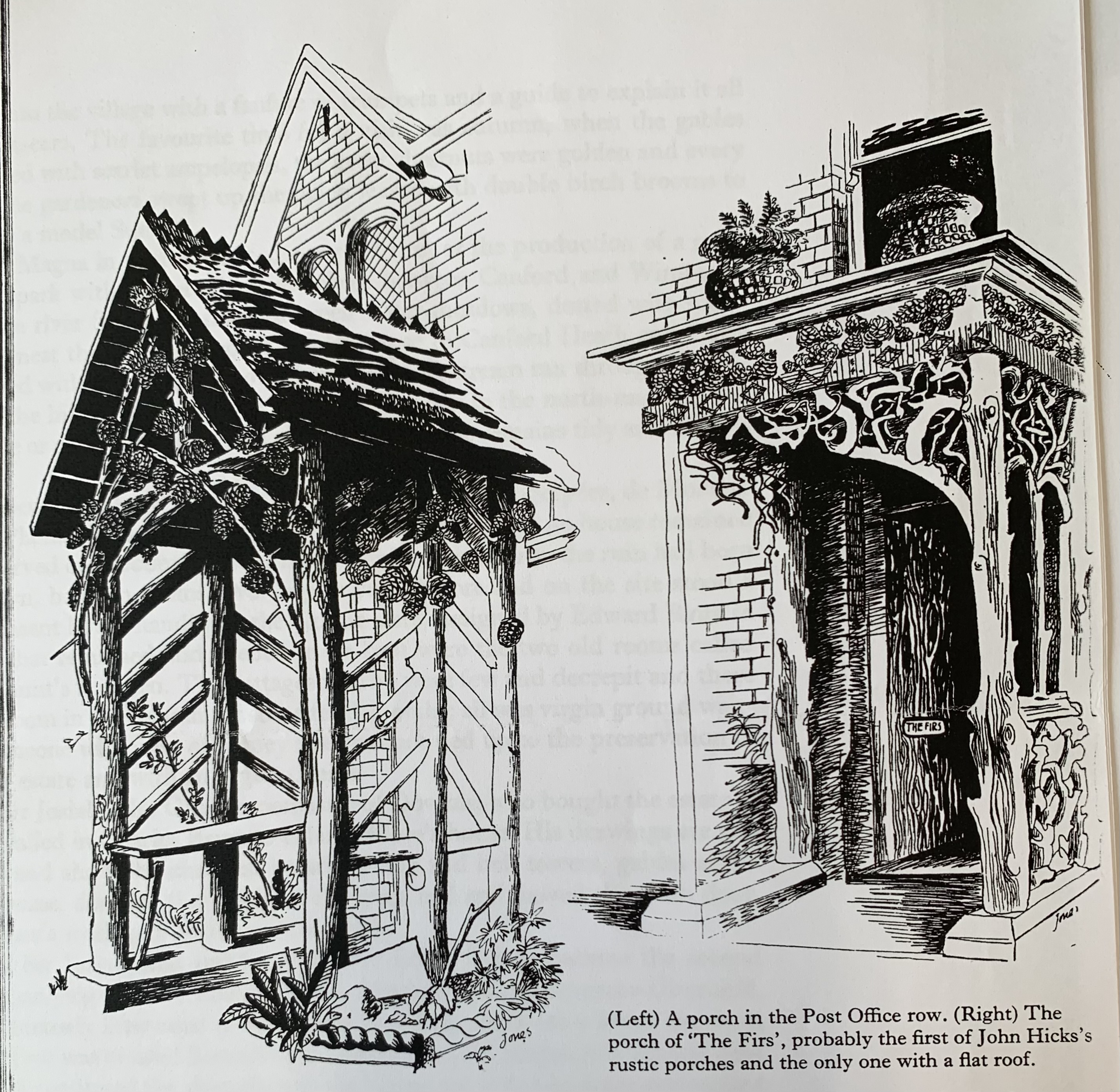
Rustic Porches designed by John Hicks for the porches of Canford Magna

In 1931 the civil parish had a population of 2985. On 1 April 1933 the parish was abolished and merged with Poole and Pamphill.

In 2025, a new incinerator was planned to be built in Canford Magna. Planning was refused by BCP Council. Local MP Vikki Slade raised the issue in parliament at Prime Minister's Questions.

== Church ==
Canford Magna Parish Church is within the village, the oldest part of which is nearly a thousand years old. During late Saxon times, a small cruciform chapel was built, which is now the chancel. The church was much expanded during the Norman period in the perpendicular gothic style, using dark local stone, with the North tower being added circa 1180.

== Canford School ==
Canford School, a co-educational private boarding school is located in the village. The school was previously the mansion and estate of Lord Wimborne, yet was sold to form the school in 1923. A golf club lies on the edge of the village and the school.
