= Oscar Guest =

British politician (1888–1958)

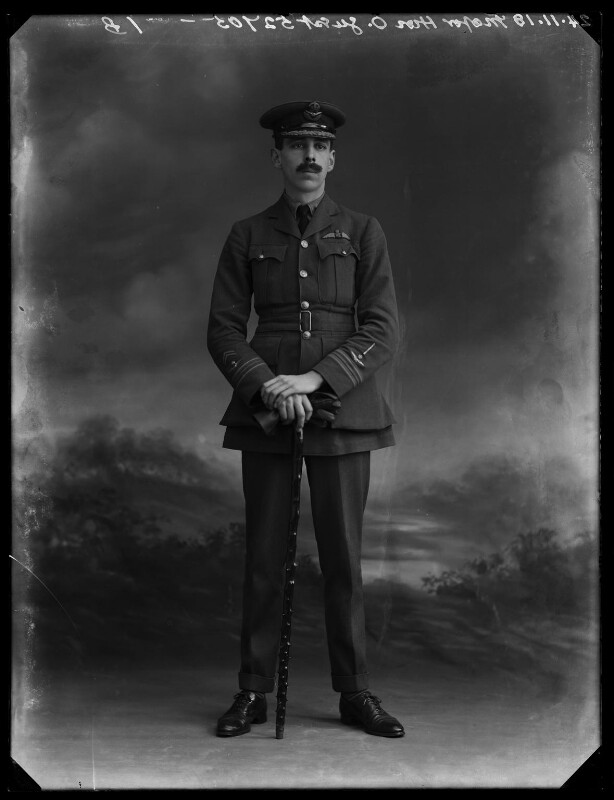
Oscar Guest

Oscar Montague Guest (24 August 1888 – 8 May 1958) was a politician in the United Kingdom, initially with the Liberal Party and later as a Conservative. He was twice elected as a Member of Parliament (MP).

== Family ==
He was the youngest of the nine children of Ivor Bertie Guest, 1st Baron Wimborne (1835–1914) and his wife Lady Cornelia Henrietta Maria Spencer-Churchill (1847–1927), daughter of John Spencer-Churchill, 7th Duke of Marlborough, aunt of Sir Winston Churchill. The Guest family were wealthy industrialists whose interests included the fastenings-manufacturing company Guest, Keen and Nettlefolds (now known as GKN). Three of Oscar's brothers (Henry, Ivor and Freddie) were also MPs, as had been their grandfather John.

He was married on 19 January 1924 to Kathleen Susan Paterson (1902–1981), and they had four children: two sons and two daughters, Bertie (1925–2007), Patrick (1927–2016), Cornelia (1928– ) and Revel (1931–2022).

== Political career ==
Oscar was elected at the 1918 general election as Liberal Party MP for Loughborough in Leicestershire, but stood down at the 1922 general election.

He did not stand for Parliament again until the 1935 general election, when he was elected as Conservative MP for the Camberwell North West constituency in South London. At the 1945 general election, he did not contest the Camberwell seat (which was won by the Labour Party candidate), but stood instead in the Breconshire and Radnorshire constituency, where his nephew Ivor had been MP in the 1930s. Oscar was defeated there, ironically by a much wider margin than the Labour majority in Camberwell North West.

Parliament of the United Kingdom
Preceded by Sir Maurice Levy	Member of Parliament for Loughborough; 1918–1922	Succeeded by Edward Spears
Preceded by James Cassels	Member of Parliament for Camberwell North West; 1935–1945	Succeeded by Freda Corbet
