= Frederic Thesiger, 1st Viscount Chelmsford =

Governor of New South Wales; Governor of Queensland; Viceroy of India (1868–1933)

His Excellency The Right Honourable The Viscount Chelmsford GCSI GCMG GCIE GBE PC
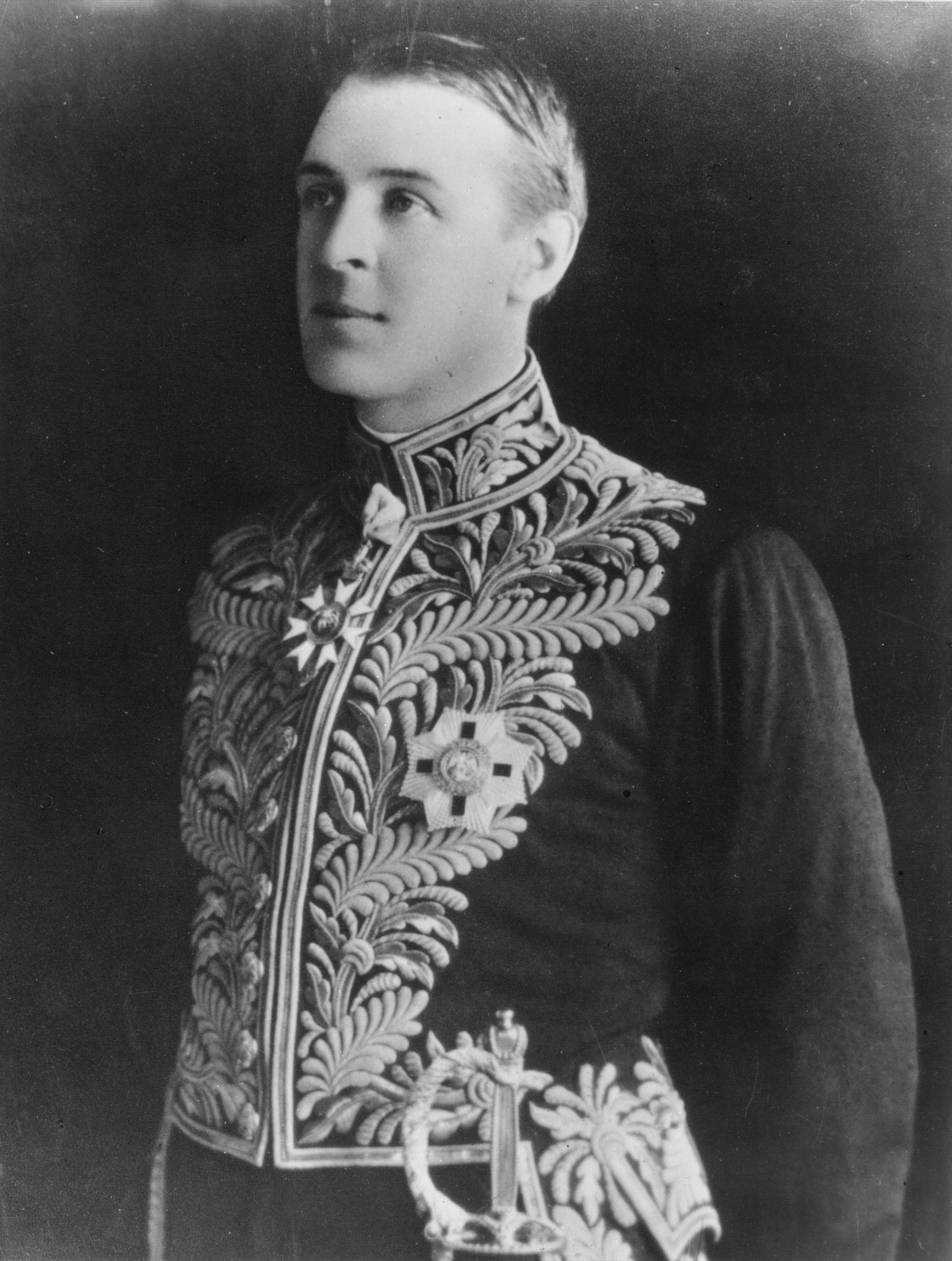
- Chelmsford as Governor of Queensland in 1907.

Viceroy and Governor-General of India
- In office 4 April 1916 – 2 April 1921
- Monarch: George V
- Preceded by: The Lord Hardinge of Penshurst
- Succeeded by: The Earl of Reading

Governor of New South Wales
- In office 28 May 1909 – 11 March 1913
- Monarchs: Edward VII; George V
- Lieutenant: Sir Frederick Darley; Sir William Cullen
- Preceded by: Sir Harry Rawson
- Succeeded by: Gerald Strickland

First Lord of the Admiralty
- In office 28 January 1924 – 7 November 1924
- Prime Minister: Ramsay MacDonald
- Preceded by: Leo Amery
- Succeeded by: William Bridgeman

Personal details
- Born: 12 August 1868 London, United Kingdom
- Died: 1 April 1933 (aged 64) London, United Kingdom
- Spouse: Hon. Frances Guest (m. 1894)
- Children: 6
- Parent(s): Frederic Thesiger, 2nd Baron Chelmsford; Adria Heath
- Education: Magdalen College, Oxford
- Profession: Politician and Colonial Administrator

Military service
- Allegiance: Great Britain
- Branch/service: British Army
- Years of service: 1902–1904; 1914–1916
- Rank: Captain; Major
- Unit: 1st Volunteer Battalion, Dorset Regiment; 1/4th Battalion, Dorset Regiment
- Battles/wars: First World War: Indian Theatre

Frederic John Napier Thesiger, 1st Viscount Chelmsford (12 August 1868 – 1 April 1933), styled the Lord Chelmsford until 1921, was a British statesman. He served as Governor of Queensland from 1905 to 1909, Governor of New South Wales from 1909 to 1913, and Viceroy of India from 1916 to 1921, where he was responsible for the creation of the Montagu–Chelmsford Reforms. After serving a short time as First Lord of the Admiralty in the government of Ramsay MacDonald, he was appointed the Agent-General for New South Wales by the government of Jack Lang before his retirement.

== Early life ==
Thesiger was born on 12 August 1868 in London, England, the son of the Frederic Thesiger, 2nd Baron Chelmsford and Adria Heath. He was educated at Winchester College and Magdalen College, Oxford, graduating from the latter as Bachelor of Arts with first-class honours in law in 1891. Thesiger was elected as a fellow of All Souls College, Oxford (1892–1899). In 1893 he was called to the Bar of the Inner Temple to practise law. He joined the army volunteer force as an officer in the 1st volunteer battalion in the Dorsetshire Regiment, and was promoted to captain on 13 September 1902.

A keen cricketer, he captained the Oxford XI and also played for Middlesex.

He was member of the London County Council between 1904 and 1905 and again as an alderman from 1913 and 1919.

== Governor of Queensland ==
On 9 April 1905, Thesiger succeeded as 3rd Baron Chelmsford upon his father's death and in July 1905 accepted his appointment as the Governor of Queensland in Australia. He arrived in Brisbane and was sworn in on 20 November. On 26 June 1906, Chelmsford was invested as a Knight Commander of Order of St Michael and St George. His term was dominated by conflict between the Legislative Council and the Legislative Assembly and the emergence of three evenly divided parties in the lower house.

Following the 1907 election, William Kidston, who had founded his own party, became Premier of Queensland with Labor support. The legislative council, then being an appointed chamber, then refused Kidston's legislative programs on electoral reforms and wage-fixing. Kidston then made a request to Chelmsford to appoint enough members to the Council in order to get his legislation through. Chelmsford refused, on the grounds that he did not have a sufficient mandate from the people to make such demands. Kidston resigned in protest and Chelmsford commissioned the Leader of the Opposition, Robert Philp, who formed a ministry, which was promptly defeated in the assembly. Chelmsford then granted Philp a dissolution, though the parliament was only six months old. Because Supply was denied by Kidston, Chelmsford stepped in and used the reserve powers to ensure that supply was passed until the election.

Kidston was returned to office in the 1908 election. The new assembly passed a motion criticising Chelmsford's action and there was widespread speculation that he would be recalled. However, nothing came of this. Despite the admission that their representative had been mistaken in granting a dissolution, the Colonial Office and the British government remained in his favour. Chelmsford's term expired just after Kidston resigned from the Labor Government and formed a coalition with Philp's Conservatives.

== Governor of New South Wales ==
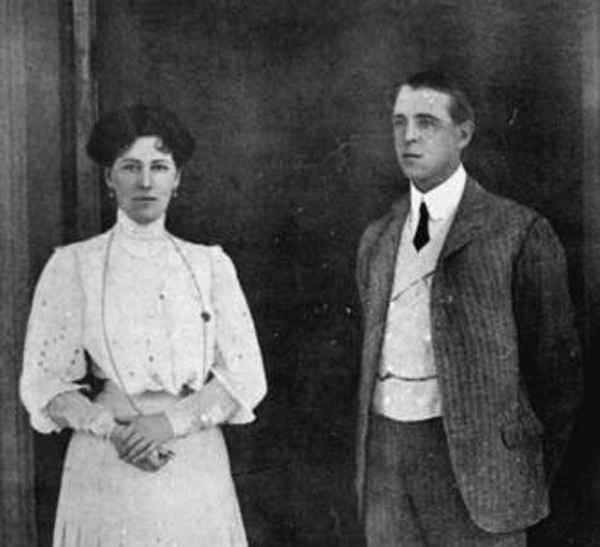
Governor and Lady Chelmsford in 1910.

In May 1909 Chelmsford accepted the appointment as Governor of New South Wales and was sworn in at Government House on 28 May 1909. Unlike in Queensland, his term was comparatively stable and was distinguished by good relations with the state government. At the start of his term, Charles Wade, of the Liberal Reform Party, was the Premier.

However, following the 1910 election, Wade's Liberals were defeated and the Labor Party under James McGowen was sworn in as the state's first Labor Government. Despite his conservative background, Chelmsford was able to get along well with the Labor Government. Chelmsford became friends with the Attorney General, William Holman, with whom they shared a love of music and as a competent Viola player, Chelmsford encouraged chamber concerts at Government House. He said of the government: "I have never had a body of Ministers with whom it has been a greater pleasure to work. They are quiet, unassuming and industrious, and have won the goodwill and loyalty of their departments."

From 21 December 1909 to 27 January 1910 Chelmsford acted as Administrator of the Commonwealth when the Governor-General of Australia, The Earl of Dudley was on leave.

From April to November 1911, Chelmsford was back in England on overseas leave, thereby avoiding a major political crisis in New South Wales. In July 1911, two Labor Members of the Legislative Assembly resigned in protest over land reforms, thereby leaving McGowen's government in a minority in the assembly. Holman, who had stepped in as acting-Premier following McGowen also taking leave (Both Chelmsford and McGowen were attending the coronation of King George V), asked the Lieutenant Governor of New South Wales, Sir William Cullen, to prorogue the Parliament until the by-elections were held.

Cullen declined on the basis that there was no need for him to act as the Government still had the confidence of the House and that the Governor had no discretion in the matter. Holman rejected this and, when Parliament resumed, resigned along with his Ministry and the Speaker. Holman further refused to advise Cullen to ask the Leader of the Opposition, Wade, to form a Government. Cullen did so nonetheless. Wade was wary, aware that if he accepted he too would be in a minority. Wade told Cullen that he would only accept if he was granted a dissolution. Cullen did not accept that condition and Wade refused to accept the commission. Cullen then had no choice but to recommission Holman and grant him a dissolution. Holman held onto Government tenuously as one seat was lost the by-elections. He therefore asked a member of the Opposition Liberals, Henry Willis, to take the Chair as Speaker.

Despite the crisis having been averted, Chelmsford returned to face increasing problems over the balance of power in the appointed New South Wales Legislative Council. The council had only five Labor members in a total of 73 and as a result, 70% of house divisions were lost by the government in its first three years in office, despite a recognised need for cooperation. Chelmsford therefore approved 11 appointments in 1912, leaving Labor with only 13 members out of 59. McGowen was under pressure to ask for more appointments to move for the abolition of the council, but he had no such intention of doing so. In October 1912, Chelmsford announced his intention not to seek a further term as governor, which the Colonial Office reluctantly accepted, describing him as "careful, hardworking and popular".

A Freemason, in 1910 he was elected the Grand Master of the United Grand Lodge of NSW and held the position until 1913. In 1909 Freemason Lodge Chelmsford 261 was established in New South Wales in his honour. In 1912 he was invested as a Knight Grand Cross of the Order of St Michael and St George, becoming Chancellor of the Order from 1914 to 1916. His term expired and Chelmsford returned to England in March 1913.

== Viceroy of India ==
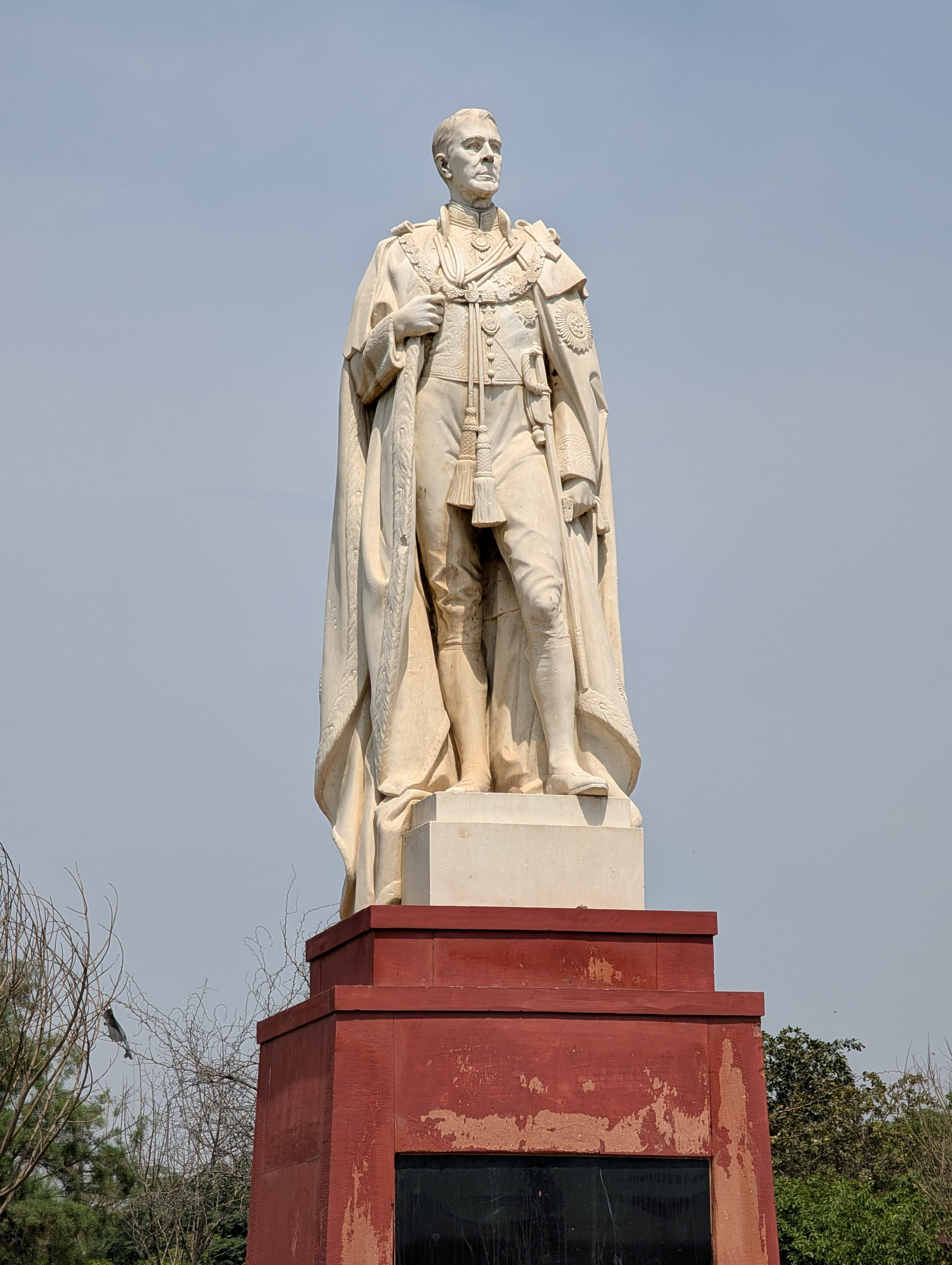
Statue of Lord Chelmsford in Coronation Park, Delhi

Upon the outbreak of the First World War in 1914 he rejoined his regiment and was posted to India. On 29 February 1916 he was appointed to the Privy Council (PC). Rising quickly, he was appointed Viceroy in March 1916, succeeding Lord Hardinge. As Viceroy he was invested as Knight Grand Commander of the Order of the Indian Empire and a Knight Grand Commander of the Order of the Star of India in 1916 and was also Grand Master of the orders. He was invested as a Knight Grand Cross of the Order of the British Empire on 4 December 1917.

His time as Viceroy was marked by consistent calls for self-government from educated Indians, a demand which Chelmsford broadly agreed with. He convinced a preoccupied Foreign Office to send the Secretary of State for India, Edwin Samuel Montagu, to discuss the potential for reform. Together, they oversaw the implementation of the Montagu–Chelmsford Reforms, which gave greater authority to local Indian representative bodies. Trying to tread a fine line between reform and maintaining the British hold over India, Chelmsford passed repressive anti-terrorism laws to widespread opposition from Indian reformists. The laws sparked unrest in the Punjab, culminating in the implementation of martial law in the region and the Amritsar Massacre by General Reginald Dyer on 13 April 1919. Initially supportive of Dyer and slow to respond to the massacre, following a ruling condemning Dyer's actions, Chelmsford eventually disciplined Dyer. This was however, seen by Indian Nationalists as too little, too late and the Indian National Congress boycotted the first regional elections in 1920. In addition to this, the Third Anglo-Afghan War broke out and Gandhi started his first campaign. On his return to Britain on 15 June 1921, he was elevated to Viscount as 1st Viscount Chelmsford of Chelmsford, County of Essex. He was often styled as Lord Chelmsford.

== Later life and legacy ==
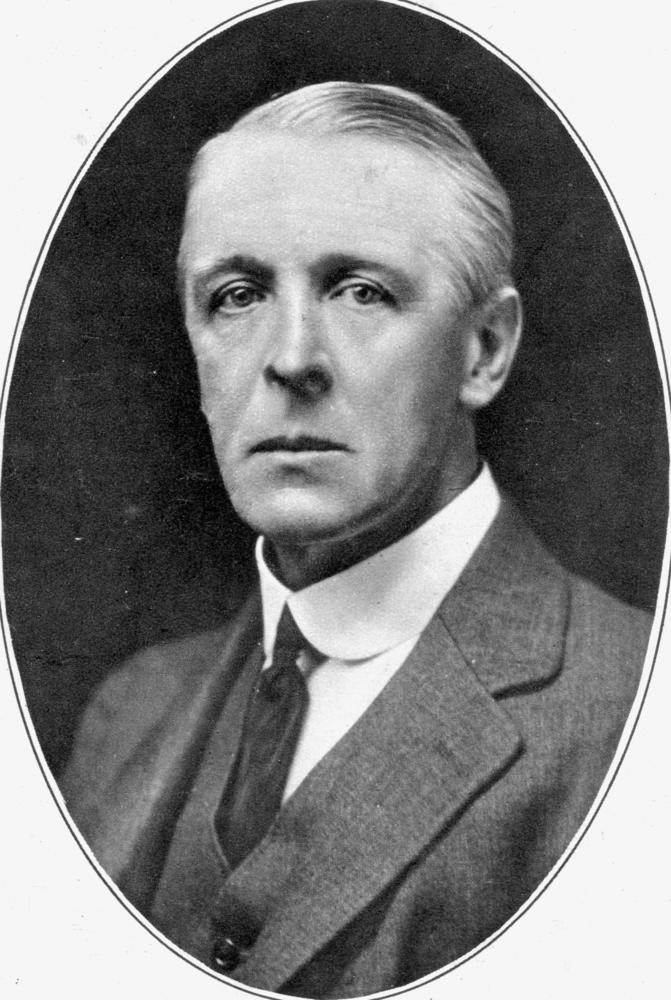
Chelmsford as First Lord of the Admiralty.

In 1924, despite being a lifelong Conservative, Chelmsford was persuaded to join the Labour government of Ramsay MacDonald in 1924 as First Lord of the Admiralty, due to the fact that Labour had so few peers in the House of Lords. He never joined the party and only agreed on the condition that the Navy's size be maintained and that he not be expected to attend any cabinet meetings of a political nature. He was duly sworn in by King George V on 23 January 1924 at Buckingham Palace. He was appointed as a Commissioner exercising the office of Lord High Admiral three times on 1 April, 15 August and 9 October 1924. Chelmsford was chairman of the Miners' Welfare Committee under the Mining Industry Act of 1920 and of the royal commission on mining subsidence in 1923–24. After the fall of the government in November 1924, he retired from political life.

In 1926 Chelmsford was appointed as Agent-General for New South Wales in London. The reasoning for this was that during state Attorney-General Edward McTiernan's visit to London to put the Government's case over its disputes with Governor Dudley de Chair's opposition over the abolition of the Legislative Council the Government needed an influential representative in London and Labor Premier, Jack Lang, explained that "it was absolutely necessary that the State should be represented by a gentleman who would be in close touch with the London financial market". He served until 1928.

He was awarded the honorary degree of Doctor of Law by Birmingham University in 1927, an honorary degree of Doctor of Civil Law by Magdalen College, Oxford University in 1929 and as a Knight of Justice of the Order of St John of Jerusalem. As a fellow of All Souls, Chelmsford became Warden of the College in 1932.

He was a long-standing Freemason, and served as Grand Master of the Grand Lodge of Queensland and the United Grand Lodge of New South Wales and the Australian Capital Territory.

== Family ==
Lord Chelmsford married Frances Charlotte Guest (22 March 1869 – 24 September 1957), daughter of Ivor Guest, 1st Baron Wimborne, and Lady Cornelia Henrietta Maria Spencer-Churchill, on 27 July 1894 at St. George's Church, Hanover Square. They had six children:

- Hon. Joan Frances Vere Thesiger (1 August 1895 – 15 May 1971), married Sir Alan Lascelles in 1920.
- Lt. Hon. Frederic Ivor Thesiger (17 October 1896 – 1 May 1917) of the 87th Brigade Royal Field Artillery,
- Hon. Anne Molyneux Thesiger (17 December 1898 – 10 August 1973), married Donough O'Brien, 16th Baron Inchiquin in 1921.
- Hon. Bridget Mary Thesiger (7 August 1900 – 18 June 1983)
- Andrew Charles Gerald Thesiger, 2nd Viscount Chelmsford (25 July 1903 – 27 September 1970)
- Hon. Margaret St. Clair Sidney Thesiger (7 May 1911 – 1 July 1991)

Lady Chelmsford was made a Dame Grand Cross of the Order of the British Empire in 1917 and was also invested with the Imperial Order of the Crown of India.

Lord Chelmsford died of coronary vascular disease on 1 April 1933, aged 64. He was succeeded by his younger son (his eldest son having been killed in action in Mesopotamia in 1917) and survived by his four daughters. On his death the Brisbane Courier noted that "the whole Empire suffers the loss of a man who, above all things, desired to be a true servant of the people."

He was the first cousin of the actor Ernest Thesiger. He was the uncle of the explorer Wilfred Thesiger (1910–2003). In the 1982 film Gandhi, the role of Chelmsford was played by Sir John Mills.

In their honour, the New South Wales government launched a new ferry, to be known as the Lady Chelmsford in 1910 as a Sydney Harbour Ferry. The Lady Chelmsford continued working the harbour until 1971 when she was sold. In Melbourne she operated as a cruising restaurant before being taken out of service and sold in 2005. Again becoming a restaurant, she sank at her moorings in February 2008 and after a protracted battle over insurance, the ship was deemed unsalvageable and broken up underwater in mid-2011.

== Honours and arms ==
=== Honours ===
| Knight Grand Commander of the Order of the Star of India (GCSI) | 1916 |
| Knight Grand Cross of the Order of St Michael and St George (GCMG) | 1912 |
| Knight Commander of the Order of St Michael and St George (KCMG) | 1906 |
| Knight Grand Commander of the Order of the Indian Empire (GCIE) | 1916 |
| Knight Grand Cross of the Order of the British Empire (GBE) | 1917 |
| Knight of Justice of the Venerable Order of St John of Jerusalem (KStJ) | 1929 |
| King George V Coronation Medal | 1911 |

=== Arms ===
Coat of arms of Frederic Thesiger, 1st Viscount Chelmsford
| Crest A cornucopia fesswise the horn Or the fruit Proper thereon a dove holding in the beak a sprig of laurel also Proper. Escutcheon Gules a griffin segreant Or within an orle of roses Argent barbed and seeded Proper. Supporters On either side a griffin Or winged Vair Motto Spes Et Fortuna (Hope and Fortune) |

Government offices
| Preceded by Sir Herbert Chermside | Governor of Queensland; 1905–1909 | Succeeded by Sir William MacGregor |
| Preceded by Sir Harry Rawson | Governor of New South Wales; 1909–1913 | Succeeded by Sir Gerald Strickland |
| Preceded by The Lord Hardinge of Penshurst | Viceroy of India; 1916–1921 | Succeeded by The Earl of Reading |
Political offices
| Preceded by Leopold Stennett Amery | First Lord of the Admiralty; 1924 | Succeeded by William Clive Bridgeman |
Diplomatic posts
| Preceded by Edward McTiernan | Agent-General for New South Wales; 1926–1928 | Succeeded by Sir George Fuller |
Academic offices
| Preceded by Francis William Pember | Warden of All Souls College, Oxford; 1932–1933 | Succeeded by William George Stewart Adams |
Peerage of the United Kingdom
| New creation | Viscount Chelmsford; 1921–1933 | Succeeded by Andrew Thesiger |
| Preceded by Frederic Thesiger | Baron Chelmsford; 1905–1933 | Succeeded by Andrew Thesiger |
