= Henry Guest =

British politician (1874–1957)

Lieutenant-Colonel Henry Guest
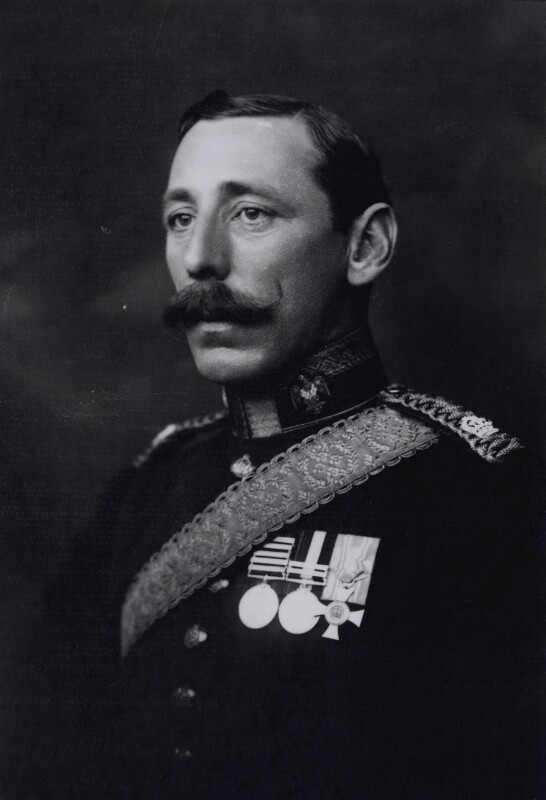

Member of Parliament for Plymouth Drake
- In office 15 June 1937 – 15 June 1945
- Preceded by: Frederick Guest
- Succeeded by: Hubert Moses Medland

Member of Parliament for Bristol North
- In office 15 November 1922 – 16 November 1923
- Preceded by: Edwin Gange
- Succeeded by: Walter Ayles

Member of Parliament for Pembroke and Haverfordwest
- In office December 1910 – 25 November 1918
- Preceded by: Owen Philipps
- Succeeded by: Constituency abolished

Member of Parliament for East Dorset
- In office 30 June 1910 – 28 November 1910
- Preceded by: Frederick Guest
- Succeeded by: Frederick Guest

Personal details
- Born: Christian Henry Charles Guest; 15 February 1874
- Died: 9 October 1957 (aged 83)
- Party: Liberal
- Spouse: Frances Lyttelton (m. 1911; died 1918)
- Children: 1
- Parents: Ivor Guest, 1st Baron Wimborne (father); Lady Cornelia Spencer-Churchill (mother)
- Relatives: Ivor Guest (brother); Frederick Guest (brother); Oscar Guest (brother)

Lieutenant-Colonel Christian Henry Charles Guest (15 February 1874 – 9 October 1957), usually known as Henry Guest, was a Liberal Party politician in the United Kingdom.

== Family ==
He was the second son of Ivor Guest, 1st Baron Wimborne and his wife Lady Cornelia Henrietta Maria Spencer-Churchill, an aunt of the future Prime Minister Winston Churchill. His elder brother Ivor Churchill Guest was one of the last Lord-Lieutenants of Ireland, and his younger brothers Frederick Guest and Oscar Guest were also members of parliament.

In 1911, he married the Honourable Frances Lyttelton (1885–1918), daughter of the 8th Viscount Cobham. They had one son, John Guest (1913–1997).

== Military career ==
Guest obtained a commission in 3rd Battalion of the Lancaster Fusiliers in 1892, and in the 1st Royal Dragoons in 1894. He served in the Second Boer War, South Africa, 1899–1902 (despatches, Queen's medal 5 clasps, King's medal 2 clasps), and 1901 was seconded for service on the Staff. After the end of the war in South Africa he was from June 1902 Aide-de-camp to Brigadier-General Burn-Murdoch, General officer in command of the Standerton District. He returned home from South Africa on the SS Saxon in late December 1902. Guest then served in India 1903–07. Upon his return to the UK he attended Staff College in 1907, and was instructor in Cavalry School. He later served in World War I 1914–15 and 1918.

== Political career ==
His younger brother Freddie was elected as Liberal Member of Parliament (MP) for East Dorset at the January 1910 general election, but was unseated after election irregularities by his constituency agent. At the resulting by-election in June 1910, Henry was elected to succeed him. At the December 1910 general election, Henry was returned for the Pembroke and Haverfordwest constituency and Freddie was re-elected for East Dorset.

When his Pembroke and Haverfordwest seat was abolished for the 1918 general election, Guest stood as a Coalition Liberal candidate in the Wandsworth Central seat in South London, where he came a poor third.

He returned to the House of Commons at the 1922 general election, as National Liberal MP for Bristol North. However, he was defeated at the 1923 election, and stood aside in 1924 in favour of his brother Freddie.

Henry did not stand for Parliament again until his brother's death in 1937, when he won the by-election for Freddie's seat of Plymouth Drake as a Conservative. He held that seat until his defeat at the 1945 general election.

Parliament of the United Kingdom
Preceded by Freddie Guest	Member of Parliament for East Dorset; June 1910–December 1910	Succeeded by Freddie Guest
Preceded by Owen Philipps	Member of Parliament for Pembroke and Haverfordwest; 1910–1918	Constituency abolished
Preceded by Stanley Gange	Member of Parliament for Bristol North; 1922–1923	Succeeded by Walter Ayles
Preceded by Freddie Guest	Member of Parliament for Plymouth Drake; 1937–1945	Succeeded by Hubert Medland
