= Baron Burden =

Barony in the Peerage of the United Kingdom

Baron Burden, of Hazlebarrow in the County of Derby, is a title in the Peerage of the United Kingdom. It was created in 1950 for the Labour politician Thomas Burden. He had previously represented Sheffield Park in the House of Commons and after his elevation to the peerage served as a Lord-in-waiting (government whip) from 1950 to 1951 in the Labour administration of Clement Attlee.

== Barons Burden (1950) ==
- Thomas William Burden, 1st Baron Burden (1885–1970)
- Philip William Burden, 2nd Baron Burden (1916–1995)
- Andrew Philip Burden, 3rd Baron Burden (1959–2000)
- Fraser William Elsworth Burden, 4th Baron Burden (born 1964)

The heir presumptive and sole heir to the peerage is the present holder's brother Hon. Ian Stuart Burden (born 1967).
