= 2nd (Leeds) Yorkshire (West Riding) Engineer Volunteers =

2nd West Riding Engineer Volunteers Northern Telegraph Companies, RE IV (West Riding) Field Brigade, RFA
- Active: 25 March 1861–7 February 1920
- Country: United Kingdom
- Branch: Volunteer Force/Territorial Force
- Role: Field engineers/Field artillery/Signals
- Part of: 49th (West Riding) Division
- Garrison/HQ: Leeds
- Engagements: Second Boer War; World War I: Battle of Aubers Ridge; German phosgene attack; Italy; Battle of the Somme

Commanders
- Notable commanders: Lt-Col Henry Stephenson, DSO, VD

The 2nd (Leeds) Yorkshire (West Riding) Engineer Volunteers was a part-time unit of the British Army raised in 1861. When the Territorial Force was formed in 1908, the corps was converted into signals and artillery units, in which roles they served through World War I. Postwar, they were absorbed into other West Yorkshire units.

== 2nd (Leeds) Yorkshire (West Riding) EVC ==
The enthusiasm for the Volunteer movement following an invasion scare in 1859 saw the creation of many Rifle, Artillery and Engineer Volunteer Corps composed of part-time soldiers eager to supplement the Regular British Army in time of need. One such unit was the 2nd Yorkshire (West Riding) Engineer Volunteer Corps (EVC) formed at Leeds on 25 March 1861. The subtitle '(Leeds)' was added in 1864. The unit grew rapidly to battalion size, with William Child appointed Lieutenant-Colonel in command on 20 August 1861, and between 1863 and 1866 the smaller 1st Yorkshire (West Riding) EVC in Sheffield was attached to the Leeds unit. The corps had a retired officer of the Regular Royal Engineers (RE) as its adjutant. All the EVCs' titles were altered to 'Royal Engineers (Volunteers)' in 1896.

The unit sent a detachment of one officer and 25 other ranks to assist the regular REs during the Second Boer War in 1900, and a second section the following year.

== Territorial Force ==
When the Volunteers were subsumed into the new Territorial Force (TF) under the Haldane Reforms of 1908, the divisional engineers and signallers of the West Riding Division were supplied by the 1st (Sheffield) West Riding RE (V). The 2nd (Leeds) West Riding RE (V) was therefore surplus, and instead was converted (together with C Company of the 3rd Volunteer Battalion, Duke of Wellington's Regiment (DWR) at Burley in Wharfedale, formerly the 23rd (Wharfedale) Yorkshire West Riding Rifle Volunteer Corps) into two new units:

- Northern Telegraph Companies, RE
  - HQ at Claypit Lane, Leeds
  - Northern Wireless Telegraph Company, Leeds
  - Northern Air-Line Telegraph Company, Leeds
  - Northern Cable Telegraph Company, Leeds
- IV West Riding (Howitzer) Brigade, Royal Field Artillery (RFA)
  - Brigade HQ at Nelson Street, Otley
  - 10th West Riding (Howitzer) Battery, Otley – from H Company, 2nd WR RE (V)
  - 11th West Riding (Howitzer) Battery, formed at Burley; by 1911 at East Parade, Ilkley – from part of C Company, 3rd VB, DWR
  - 4th West Riding Brigade Ammunition Column, Peel Place, Burley – from F Company, 2nd WR RE (V), and part of C Company, 3rd VB, DWR

The Northern Telegraph Companies (Signal Companies from 1910) were a lieutenant-colonel's command. They were defined as 'Army Troops' under Northern Command HQ, but were administratively under the West Riding Division. The Leeds Postal Telegraph Messengers' Cadet Company was attached to the unit.

The IV (or 4th) West Riding Brigade formed part of the West Riding Divisional Artillery. Each of its batteries was equipped with four 5-inch howitzers.

== World War I ==
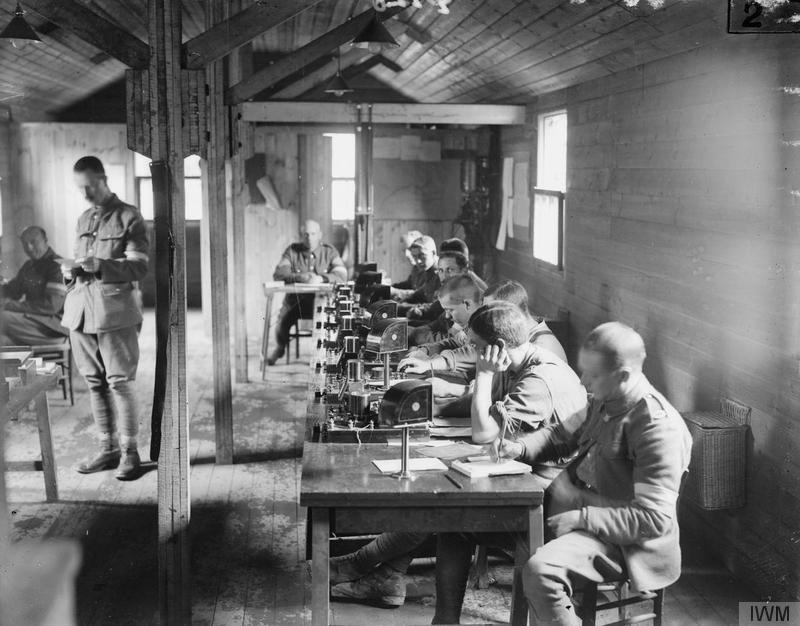
A Royal Engineers signal exchange station during World War I.

On the outbreak of World War I, the three Northern Signal Companies were formed into the RE Signals Depot at Biggleswade. Although the companies did not see active service as complete units, they raised a number of new signal units that served on the Western Front and in the Middle East, beginning with a Northern Motor Wireless Section and a Northern Motor Airline Section, which embarked for the Western Front on 26 October and 6 November 1914 respectively.

Towards the end of July 1914, the units of the West Riding Division went to their annual camps, but on 3 and 4 August orders arrived, recalling them to their respective HQs. The order to mobilise was issued on 4 August. Units then proceeded to their war stations as part of Central Force in Home Defence and began battle training.

In the first days of the war, TF units were invited to volunteer for Overseas Service. On 15 August 1914, the War Office issued instructions to separate those men who had signed up for Home Service only, and form these into reserve units. On 31 August, the formation of a reserve or 2nd Line unit was authorised for each 1st Line unit where 60 per cent or more of the men had volunteered for Overseas Service. The titles of these 2nd Line units would be the same as the original, but distinguished by a '2/' prefix. In this way duplicate units and formation were created, mirroring being sent overseas. Later the 2nd Line themselves were prepared for overseas service.

=== 1/IV West Riding (Howitzer) Brigade, RFA ===
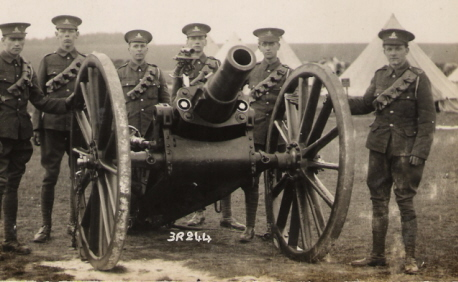
BL 5-inch howitzer and TF gunners in camp before World War I.

The division was informed on 31 March 1915 that it had been selected for overseas service with the British Expeditionary Force (BEF) as a complete division, and it began entraining for the embarkation ports on 12 April. 1/IV West Riding Bde was at Doncaster, and left in three trains on 14/15 April, embarking on the hired transport SS Anglo-Canadian at Southampton. It landed at Le Havre early on 16 April with a strength of 19 officers and 392 other ranks.The command of the brigade had been vacant on the outbreak of war, and it was taken to France under the command of Lt-Col Henry Stephenson who had commanded 8th West Riding Bty in III West Riding Bde before the war. By 19 April the division had completed its concentration behind the River Lys in the Estaires area. 1/IV WR Bde took up positions at Richebourg-Saint-Vaast on 26–27 April and began registering its guns.

==== Aubers Ridge ====
49th (West Riding) Division's formation badge.

After introduction to trench warfare, the West Riding Division's first action was the Battle of Aubers Ridge on 9 May. The division had taken over most of the frontage of IV Corps to allow the assault formations to concentrate before the attack. But 1/IV WR Bde, with its eight old 5-inch howitzers, was loaned to I Corps further south. Partly because of a shortage of artillery ammunition, the preliminary bombardment was to last only 40 minutes, of which the final 10 minutes was to be intense; the BEF thereby hoped to achieve a degree of surprise. The howitzers at Richebourg-Saint-Vaast were about 1,000 yards (910 m) behind the barbed wire-cutting field guns; their role was to break down the German parapets at a range of about 2,600 yards (2,400 m). The bombardment began at 05.00 and became intense at 05.30, when the field guns joined the howitzers in attempting to destroy the parapets and the attacking infantry moved off into No man's land. But despite the bombardment, the Germans were looking over their parapets and brought down heavy machine gun fire on the infantry before they even reached their jumping-off points 80 yards (73 m) from the parapet. At 05.40, when the guns fell silent, the infantry rushed the parapet, running into devastating fire. They found that the bombardment had completely failed, with very few gaps made in wire or the breastworks; those who penetrated into the German position were quickly mopped up. The bombardment was renewed from 06.15 to 07.00, but the gunners were unable to locate the German's machine gun loopholes at the base of the breastwork, and a renewed attack also failed, with the infantry pinned down in No man's land. The field gunners kept up fire on the German parapets and communication trenches during the morning. By the time I Corps made a second failed assault in the afternoon howitzer ammunition was running very low. A last 10 minute bombardment of the parapet had no more effect, and further attacks were called off. The survivors of the attacking brigades crept back from No man's land after dark. The attack by IV Corps, to which the rest of West Riding Divisional Artillery had contributed, was no more successful. There was not enough ammunition to renew the offensive on succeeding days (1/IV WR Bde had fired about 1200 Lyddite shells in the day).

==== Hooge ====
The West Riding Division (which was redesignated the 49th (West Riding) Division on 12 May) resumed normal trench duties. On 22 May, the brigade moved to Fleurbaix, and two days later the divisional artillery (49th DA) supported a short advance part-way across No man's land to occupy new trenches dug under cover of darkness and some ruined houses (one of them targeted by 1/11th WR Bty), which were then fortified. In June the division came under Indian Corps, which had a defensive role in the action at Givenchy on 15–16 June, and the guns remained silent. At the beginning of July, the division moved to Proven, with 1/IV WR Bde at Brielen, and came under VI Corps in the Ypres Salient. On the evening of 8 August, it carried out a feigned attack on Pilckem Ridge to divert attention from a real attack next day to regain lost ground at Hooge Chateau.

==== Gas attack ====
49th (WR) Division remained in the Ypres Salient through the autumn of 1915. 1/IV WR Brigade was based around Brielen with brigade HQ at Elverdinge, both of which were frequently shelled by the enemy. It occasionally fired a few retaliatory rounds of its own at the request of the frontline infantry and did a few registration shoots with aircraft observation. Enemy shelling became more intense in mid-December and, on 17 December, the brigade was ordered to fire a few shells at the enemy second line trenches: the BEF had received warning of an impending gas attack and VI Corps hoped to destroy the gas cylinders. However, the small ammunition allocation (an average of 3 rounds per gun per day) was too small to have much effect. At 05.00 on 19 December an unusual parachute flare went up from the German lines and shortly afterwards the hiss of a gas discharge was heard. The British front line was subjected to heavy artillery and rifle fire. 1/10th West Riding Bty was ordered to open fire and put down 119 shells on 'High Command Redoubt' and the trenches opposite 148th (3rd West Riding) Brigade. 1/11th West Riding Bty picked up the infantry messages and fired on its usual SOS targets of 'Ferme 14' and the 'T', before being ordered to concentrate on the enemy trenches. The enemy artillery now began bombarding all roads and artillery positions behind the British front line. However, the British anti-gas precautions had worked well, despite the enemy's use of phosgene gas for the first time, and the retaliatory artillery and rifle fire discouraged a full attack by the enemy infantry. Shelling by both sides continued for the rest of the day before dying down. 1/11th West Riding Bty had suffered five casualties, one from gas, four from shellfire, and one gun put out of action by a direct hit.

==== Reorganisation ====
49th (WR) Division was relieved in the line on the night of 30/31 December and sent for rest, though sections of 1/10th and 1/11th WR Btys remained in position until the incoming batteries had complete their registration on 3 January 1916. The batteries were billeted at Arnèke, where between 4 and 31 January they were re-armed with modern 4.5-inch howitzers. On 4 February the division went by train to Longeau near Amiens. On 15 February 1/IV WR Bde took over positions from CLXIV (Rotherham) Howitzer Bde (a 'Kitchener's Army' formation), which was being broken up. D (Howitzer) Bty of that brigade joined 1/IV WR Bde as its third battery. It retained its designation as D (H) Bty for some time, then was known as 15th West Riding Bty (possibly unofficially).

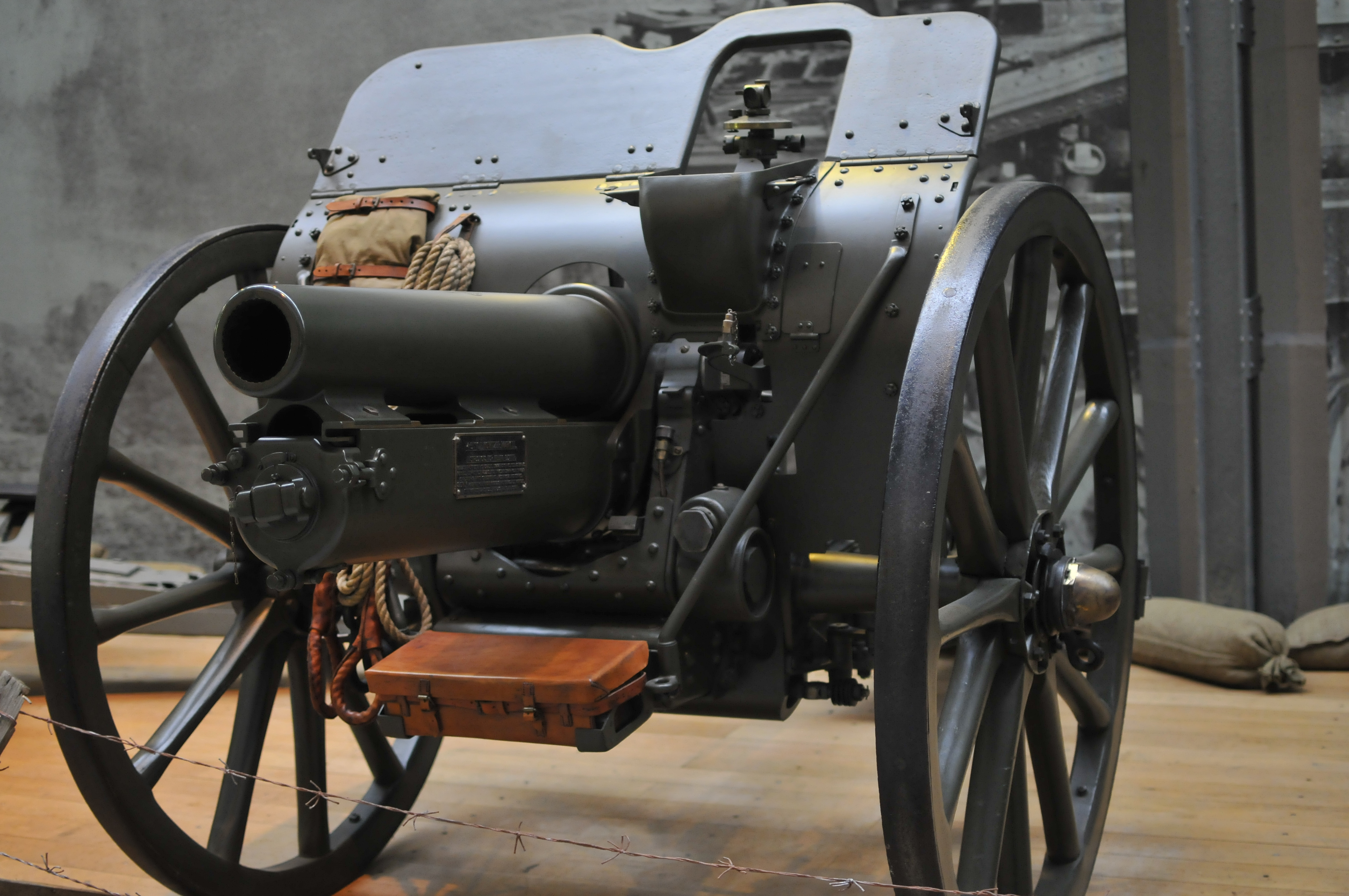
4.5-inch howitzer

On 7 March, the brigade was withdrawn and moved to Contay, where it joined the corps reserve and remained in billets at Canaples, training and reorganising. TF brigades were in the process of being numbered, and on 1 May 1/IV West Riding Brigade became CCXLVIII (or 248th) Brigade, RFA (it continued to refer to itself as 248th (WR) Brigade), and by 21 May it had been completely reorganised, ceasing to be a howitzer brigade. Its three batteries were transferred to the other three brigades in 49th DA, giving them one howitzer battery each:

- 1/10th West Riding Bty to CCXLVI (1/II West Riding) Bde as D (H) Bty
- 1/11th West Riding Bty to CCXLV (1/I West Riding) Bde as D (H) Bty
- 15th West Riding Bty to CCXLVII (1/III West Riding) Bde as D (H) Bty

Simultaneously, the brigade was reformed with one 18-pounder field gun battery from each of the other brigades, giving the following organisation:

- A Bty – former 1/3rd West Riding Bty from CCXLV Bty
- B Bty – former 1/5th West Riding Bty from CCXLVI Bde
- C Bty – D Bty from CCXLVII Bde, recently numbered as 14th West Riding Bty

The brigade ammunition columns were abolished in 19 May and absorbed into the Divisional Ammunition Column.

==== Somme ====
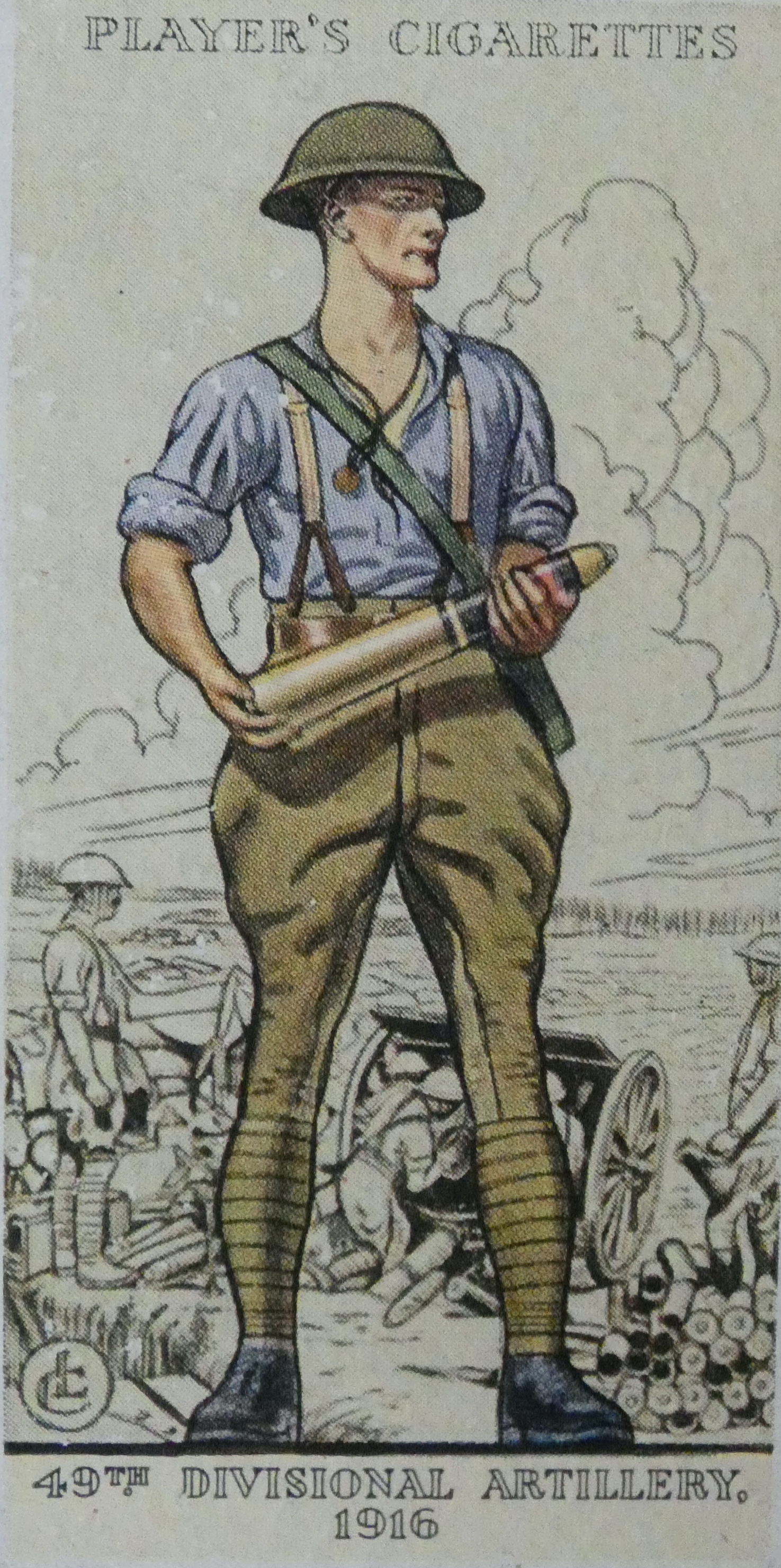

Lieutenant-Col Stephenson remained in command of the reorganised brigade, which continued training at Canaples (with B/CCXLVII Bty attached) until the middle of June. The other brigades of 49th DA had already gone into the line under the command of other divisions. On 16 June the brigade moved to Mirvaux, west of Albert, then up to Hédauville on 26 June. The preliminary bombardment for the Somme Offensive had already begun, but CCXLVIII Bde was not involved. Instead, on 1 July (the First day on the Somme) it moved up to an assembly point where it waited under the command of 36th (Ulster) Division for orders to advance behind the infantry. The Ulster Division did reach its objectives – one of the few successes on the day – but the divisions on either flank had failed despite the assistance of part of 49th (WR) Division from reserve, and the 36th could not hold its positions. The order for CCXLVIII Bde to advance never came, and at the end of the day it marched back to Hédauville. Next day A, C and B/CCXLVII Batteries handed over their guns to 32nd and 36th Divisions to replace theirs damaged in action.

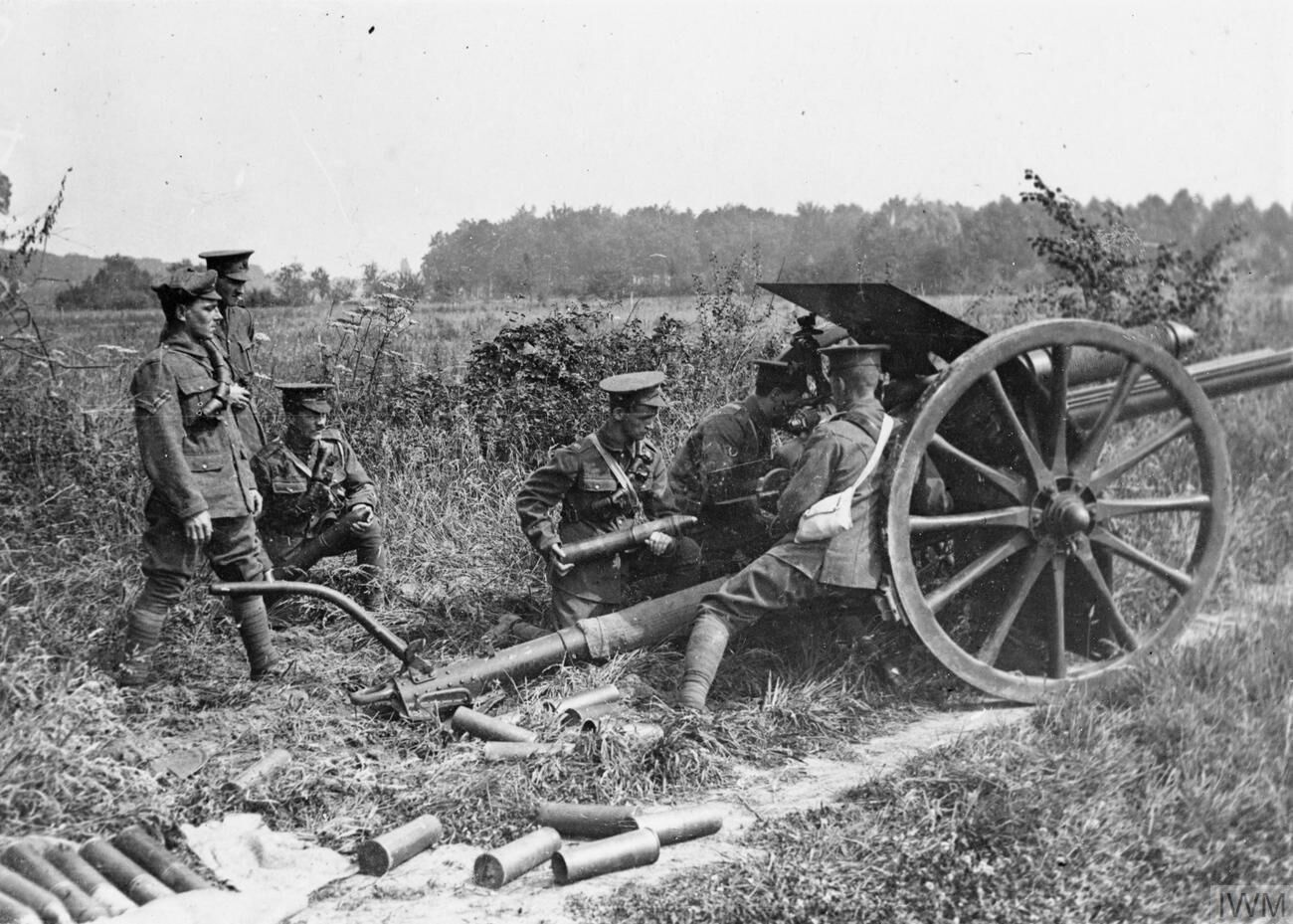
18-pounder in action on the Somme.

On 6 July, the brigade's only remaining battery equipped with guns, B, took over from one of 36th (Ulster) Division's batteries and went into action the same night. On 9 July, the gunners of the other two plus B/CCXLVII relieved batteries of 32nd and 36th Division, taking over guns in position. On 12 July, 49th DA resumed control of the sector for the forthcoming with CCXLVIII Bde's batteries grouped under CCXLVI Bde HQ. 49th (WR) Division was fighting to improve the British positions in the Leipzig Salient, as a preliminary for the next major attack (the Battle of Bazentin Ridge). It had to fight off numerous counter-attacks, including one made on 15 July with the aid of flamethrowers. The batteries were shuffled between a Right Group and Left Group of 49th DA (B/CCXLVII Bty returned to its own brigade after its long attachment), and on 21 July the division made another attempt to extend its positions in the Leipzig Salient. As the fighting continued into August (the Battle of Pozières), Brigade HQ of CCXLVIII Bde took over the Centre Group of the divisional frontage, with the four batteries of CCXLVII Bde and B/CCXLI Bty of 48th (South Midland) Division under its command, while C/CCXLVIII Bty was in Right Group, commanded by CCXLI Bde of 48th DA. The group carried out day and night firing, including blocking barrages to isolate the Lipezig Salient at night and prevent German reliefs. Even when 48th (SM) Division and then 12th (Eastern) Division took over the attacks towards Thiepval, 49th DA's batteries remained in the line. Right Group (including its HQ in Mesnil) was heavily shelled with gas shells during the attack of 12 August against 'Skyline Trench', but the barrage was described as 'excellent' and the attack was successful, though some of the batteries were put out of action by the gas that night. Most were back in action the following day while 48th (SM) Division cleared the rest of Skyline Trench. 49th DA supported 48th (SM) Division's attack of 18 August, which was pushed forward quickly behind a surprise barrage; 49th DA's barrage was placed to prevent German reinforcements from Thiepval reinforcing the area being attacked.

49th (WR) Division was relieved on the night of 18/19 August, but 49th DA remained in action under the command of 25th Division. Centre Group's gun positions around Martinsart were badly shelled by heavy German guns. On 21–24 August, 49th DA supported attacks by 48th (SM) Division with the usual blocking barrages behind the Leipzig Salient and to prevent reinforcements from Thiepval. On 24–25 August, 25th Division attacked 'Hindenburg Trench'; the German counter-battery (CB) fire was intense, and some batteries had to be temporarily withdrawn. In late August Centre Group was turned onto wire-cutting in preparation for the next round of attacks by 25th Division. 49th (WR) Division had returned to the line on 27 August, and when it attacked towards St Pierre Divion and the Schwaben Redoubt on 3 September, Centre Group fired in direct support of 147th (2nd West Riding) Bde. The attack was a disaster, but no blame attached to the artillery, which had provided an 'excellent' barrage, despite the difficulties of observation in the misty valley of the River Ancre.

The Ancre sector remained relatively quiet while a big offensive (the Battle of Flers-Courcelette) was being prepared, but the artillery of both sides continued CB and retaliatory fire. The night before the new offensive opened (15 September), 49th DA supported an attack by 11th (Northern) Division to re-take some lost ground before the infantry of 49th (WR) Division took over the following morning, covered by an artillery barrage and smoke discharge as a diversion to the main attack elsewhere. Centre Group continued firing as the offensive developed, even though 49th (WR) Division's contributions consisted of raids by 148th Bde against the troublesome 'Pope's Nose' position and by 147th Bde to seize and consolidate a section of trench. From 26 to 28 September, 49th (WR) Division's batteries (and some of its infantry) supported the attacks by 11th (N) Division and 18th (Eastern) Division on 'Stuff Redoubt', 'Hessian Redoubt' and the Schwaben Redoubt: in mid-afternoon on 26 September, Centre Group's Forward Observation Officers reported from Thiepval Chateau that the whole of the village was finally in British hands. The Schwaben Redoubt and Pope's Nose were mopped up on 28 September, when the guns had the satisfaction of firing at Germans troops in the open. The batteries continued firing defensive barrages until the end of the month when 49th DA was relieved.

CCXLVIII Brigade HQ and its own batteries re-assembled at Hédauville on 3 September and marched next day to Soulty, near Doullens, for rest and reorganisation. Divisional artilleries were now being reorganised into two larger brigades: on 18 October 1916 CCXLVIII Bde was broken up to bring the 18-pdr batteries of the other two up to six guns each:

- A Bty + R Section C Bty to CCXLV Bde
- B Bty + L Section C Bty to CCXLVI Bde

The rest of Brigade HQ joined the Divisional Ammunition Column. The batteries with their new parent brigades continued to fight under 49th (West Riding) Divisional Artillery on the Western Front until the Armistice with Germany on 11 November 1918.

=== 2/IV West Riding (Howitzer) Brigade, RFA ===
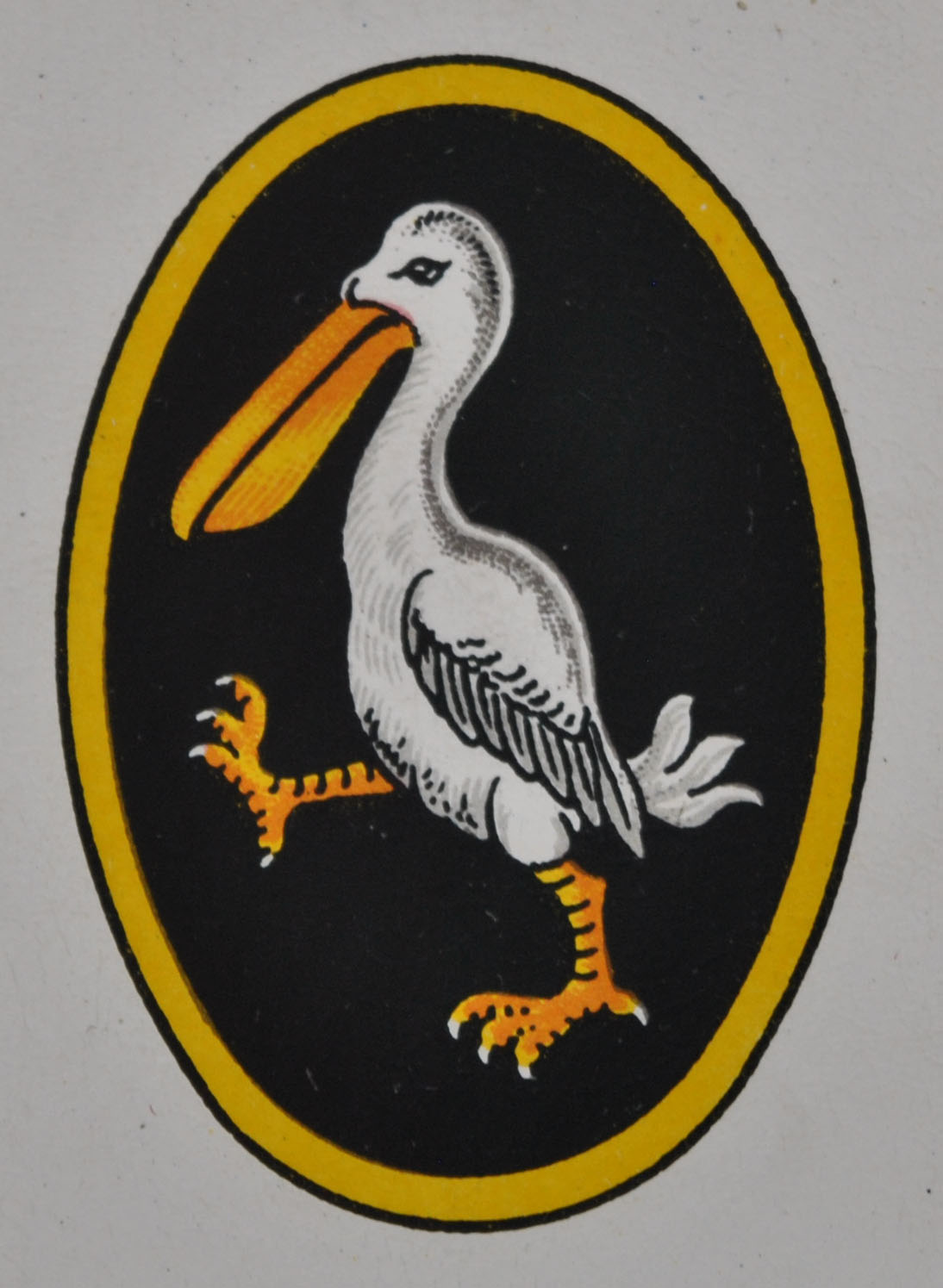
62nd (2nd West Riding ) Division's formation badge.

The 2nd West Riding Division (62nd (2nd West Riding) Division from August 1915) began assembling in the area of Derbyshire and Nottinghamshire from March 1915, but training for the 2nd Line artillery of the West Riding was carried out under exceptional difficulty. After the 1st Line had left for France in April the 2nd Line was issued with a few obsolete French De Bange 90 mm guns, with 20 rounds for each gun. The ammunition had been in storage for many years, and no-one could interpret the markings on the gunsights or the fuzes. At the same time the division with its obsolete equipment was under orders to entrain at short notice to assist in repelling any raid on the East Coast, with trains in readiness day and night. The divisional commander later commented that if his artillery had been 'called upon to take part in the defence of the coast, the casualties it caused would have been at the breech-end of the guns'.

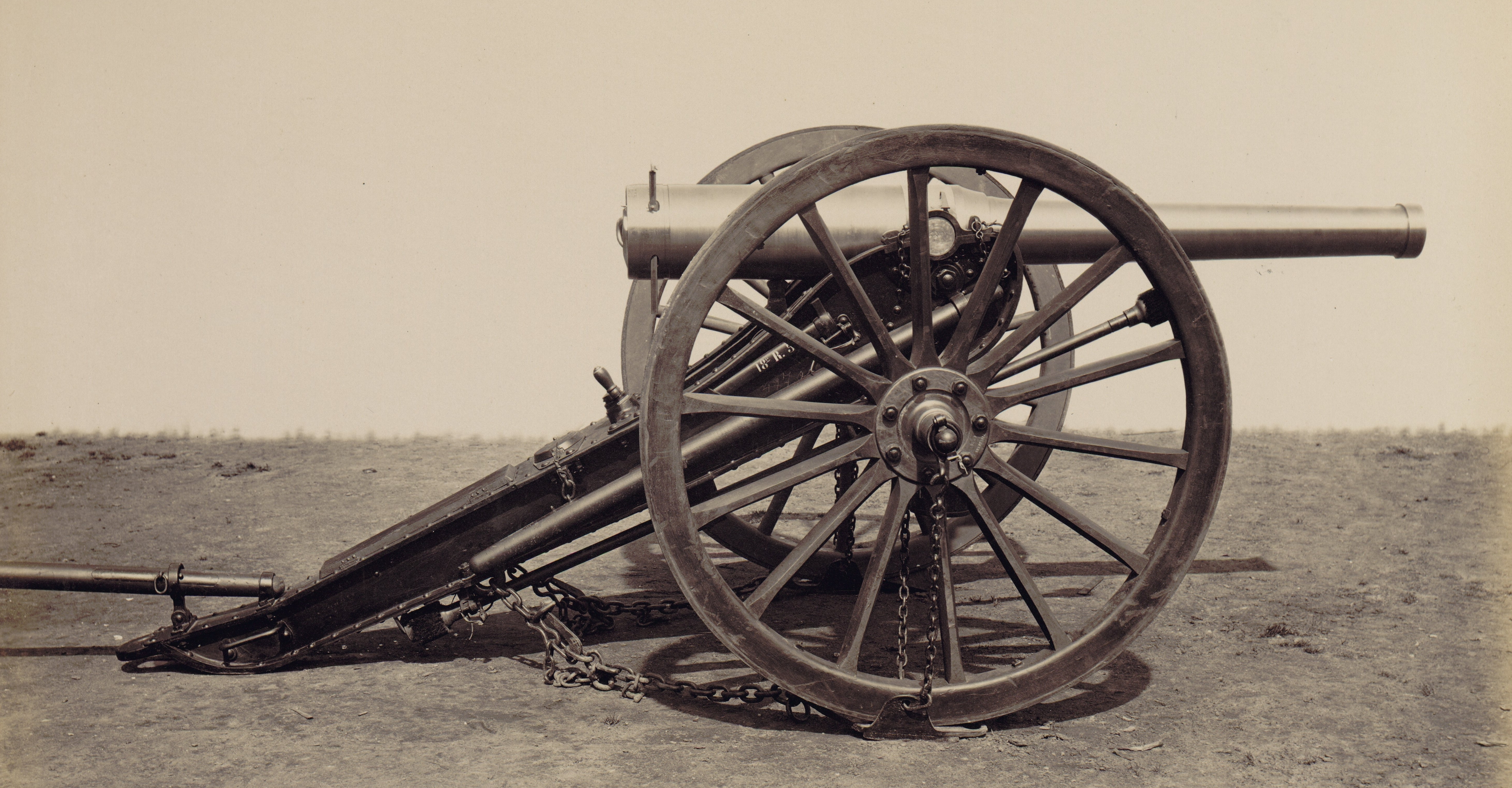
De Bange 90 mm French field gun issued to 2nd Line batteries.

In the summer of 1915, the division camped in The Dukeries area of Nottinghamshire for field training, then in the autumn concentrated at Retford before moving to Newcastle upon Tyne to work on coast defences during the winter. At the beginning of 1916, the divisional artillery received modern guns – 4.5-inch howitzers for 2/IV West Riding Bde – and the division moved to Salisbury Plain for battle training. However, the supply of recruits from the West Riding was running short, and 62nd (2nd WR) Division was stripped of trained men to provide reinforcement drafts to 49th (WR) Division on the Western Front; this delayed the completion and training of the division. On 3 May 1916, before this was completed, 2/IV West Riding Bde was broken up to provide a howitzer battery to each of the other brigades of the divisional artillery. The division finally went to the Western Front in January 1917, and fought there until the Armistice.

== Postwar ==
When the TF was reconstituted on 7 February 1920, neither of the former 2nd West Riding RE units from Leeds was reformed. The RE Signals Service became the Royal Corps of Signals (RCS), and the 49th (West Riding) Divisional Signal Company moved to Leeds, where it merged with the Northern Signal Companies to form 49th Divisional Signals, RCS (a battalion-sized unit). The two howitzer batteries remained with the field brigades they had joined during the war:

- 10th West Riding Bty with the former II West Riding Brigade, by now the 70th (West Riding) Bde, becoming 280th (10th West Riding) Bty
- 11th West Riding Bty with the former I West Riding Brigade, now 69th (West Riding) Bde, becoming 276th (11th West Riding) Bty.

== Honorary Colonels ==
The following served as Honorary Colonel of the unit:

- Capt Frederic Charles Trench Gascoigne, formerly of the 66th Foot, appointed 26 November 1862
- Col William C. Dawson, VD, former CO, 2nd WR RE (V), appointed 1 December 1906
- Lt-Col Walter S. Dawson, TD, formerly in 2nd WR RE (V), appointed (to IV West Riding Bde), 1 May 1914

=== Other notable officers ===
- Lt-Col Henry Stephenson, DSO, VD, transferred from III West Riding Bde (the 'Sheffield Artillery') to command 1/IV West Riding Brigade and CCXLVIII (WR) Brigade on the Western Front. He was a former Lord Mayor of Sheffield and pro-Chancellor of the University of Sheffield, sitting as the university's representative on the West Riding Territorial Association. He became Member of Parliament for Sheffield Park at the 1918 'Khaki election', holding the seat until 1923. He was created a baronet in 1936.
- Maj Francis Anson Arnold-Forster, who commanded 1/4th West Riding Brigade Ammunition Column before the war and on the Western Front, was a minor war poet. His unpublished The Howitzer Brigade (1915) is in the Liddle Collection of the University of Leeds

== Memorial ==
A large wooden memorial panel, now in the collection of Otley Museum, lists the 'Officers, NCOs & men of the 10th (Otley) Howitzer Battery, who landed in France on 15 April 1915'; the names are flanked by lists of the actions in which the battery served.
