= Storry =

Storry may refer to:

- Beth Storry (born 1978), English field hockey goalkeeper
- Raymond Storry, character in EastEnders
- Malcolm Storry (born 1948), British actor
- Richard Storry Deans Deans (1868–1938), British politician
- Storry Walton, Australian academic
