= West Riding Artillery =

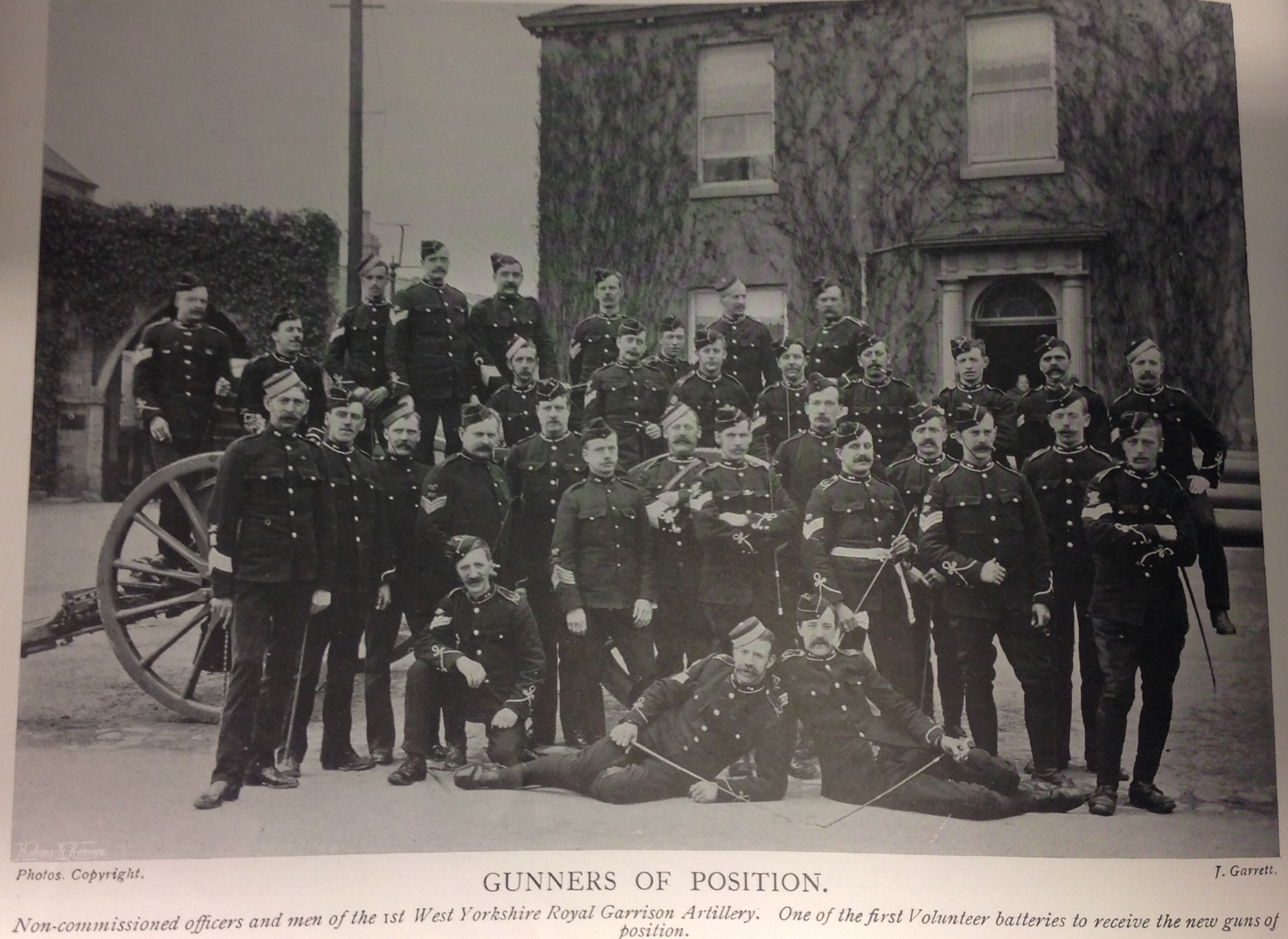
- Non Commissioned Officers and men of the 1st West Riding Royal Garrison Artillery (Volunteers), 1902
- Active: 1860–1967
- Country: United Kingdom
- Branch: Territorial Army
- Type: Artillery Regiment
- Role: Garrison Artillery; Coastal Artillery; Field Artillery
- Engagements: World War I World War II

The West Riding Artillery was formed as a group of volunteer units of the British Army in 1860. Its units later formed the divisional artillery of the West Riding Division of the Territorial Force in World War I and World War II. The West Riding Artillery's lineage is continued in a battery of today's Army Reserve

== Volunteer Force ==
In 1859, as the United Kingdom feared invasion from the continent, the government reluctantly accepted the creation of many Rifle, Artillery and Engineer Volunteer Corps composed of part-time soldiers eager to supplement the Regular British Army in time of need. The Secretary of State for War allowed the Artillery Volunteer Corps (AVCs) free access to guns and ammunition for practice. Most of the AVCs were formed in the coastal counties to man fixed coast defence guns but the following corps were raised in the inland West Riding of Yorkshire:

- 1st (Leeds) Yorkshire (West Riding) AVC raised at Leeds on 2 August 1860; additional batteries were formed on 6 August and 1 November, and on 4 January 10 and 17 February 1862; there were eight batteries by the beginning of 1866
- 2nd (Bradford) Yorkshire (West Riding) AVC formed at Bradford on 10 October 1860; included batteries at Valley Parade and Heckmondwike
- 3rd (York) Yorkshire (West Riding) AVC formed at York on 9 February 1861
- 4th (Sheffield) Yorkshire (West Riding) AVC formed with two batteries at Sheffield on 6 February 1861; additional batteries formed on 2 May 1861 (one) and 17 October 1862 (two); there were eight batteries by the beginning of 1866; its subtitle 'The Sheffield Artillery' was authorised in 1864
- 5th (Bowling) Yorkshire (West Riding) AVC formed from two batteries of the 2nd Corps (including one at Batley) on 1 March 1864; absorbed back into 2nd Corps in November 1874
- 6th (Heckmondwike) Yorkshire (West Riding) AVC formed from part of the 2nd Corps on 24 May1867 absorbed back into 2nd Corps by April 1875
- 7th (Batley) Yorkshire (West Riding) AVC formed from part of the 5th Corps on 24 May 1867; disbanded in August 1877
- 8th (Halifax) Yorkshire (West Riding) AVC formed on 19 May 1871

The 1st Administrative Brigade of Yorkshire (West Riding) Artillery Volunteers was formed at Bradford on 21 March 1864 and eventually included the 2nd, 5th, 6th, 7th and 8th AVCs. The 3rd West Riding AVC at York joined the 1st Administrative Brigade of Yorkshire (East Riding) Artillery Volunteers. The larger 1st and 4th West Riding AVCs remained independent.

The West Riding AVCs began as coastal artillery armed with 32-pounder smoothbore muzzleloading guns. In 1868, the 5th West Riding AVC won the Queen's Prize at the annual National Artillery Association competition held at Shoeburyness. The following year, the 7th West Riding AVC won the competition, with the 4th West Riding AVC winning it in 1872.

When the Volunteers were consolidated into larger units in 1880, the 1st Admin Brigade became the 2nd Yorkshire (West Riding) Artillery Volunteers on 16 March with the batteries distributed as follows:

- Numbers 1 to 4 at Bradford
- Numbers 5 and 6 at Heckmondwike
- Numbers 7 and 8 at Halifax

The 3rd West Riding AVC was absorbed into the 1st Yorkshire (East Riding) AV.

On 1 April 1882, the West Riding AVs became part of the Northern Division, Royal Artillery, changing to the Western Division on 1 July 1889, and were titled 1st, 2nd and 4th West Riding of Yorkshire Artillery Volunteers, with headquarters at Leeds, Bradford and Sheffield respectively.

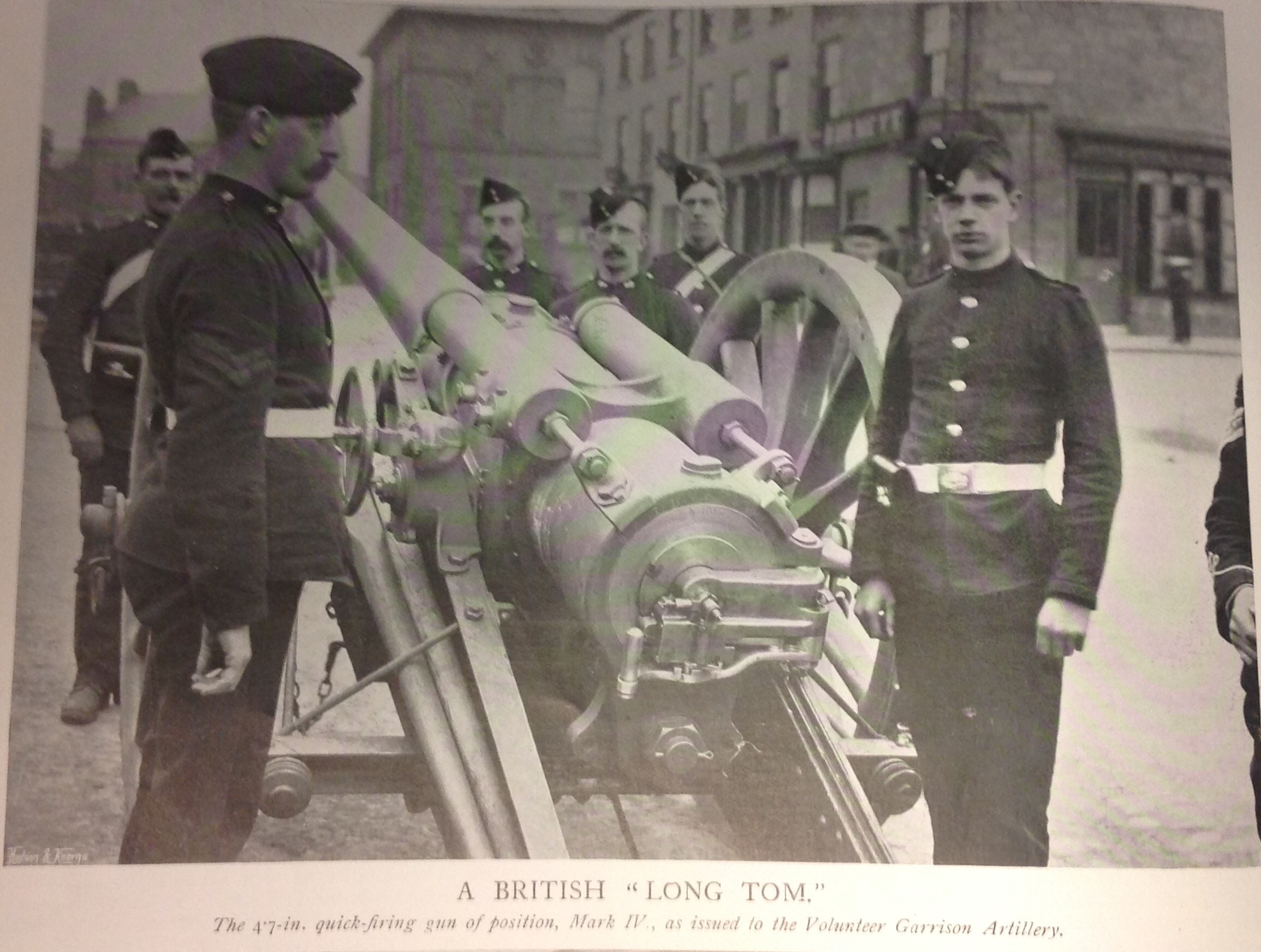
1st West Yorkshire Royal Garrison Artillery (Volunteers) with newly issued 4.7-inch QF guns, 1902.

As well as manning fixed coast defence artillery, some of the early Artillery Volunteers manned semi-mobile 'position batteries' of smooth-bore field guns pulled by agricultural horses. But the War Office refused to pay for the upkeep of field guns for Volunteers and they had largely died out in the 1870s. In 1888, the 'position artillery' concept was revived and some Volunteer companies (particularly in inland counties) were reorganised as position batteries to work alongside the Volunteer infantry brigades. By 1894, all three West Riding units had been classified as position artillery, each organised in four batteries and equipped with 40 pounder rifled breechloading guns.

On 1 June 1899, all the Volunteer artillery units became part of the Royal Garrison Artillery (RGA) and with the abolition of the RA's divisional organisation on 1 January 1902, the West Riding units became the 1st, 2nd and 4th West Riding of Yorkshire RGA (Volunteers). 'Position artillery' was reclassified as 'heavy artillery' in May 1902, and the batteries were re-equipped with 4.7-inch quick-firing guns drawn by steam tractors.

== Territorial Force ==
=== Haldane Reforms ===
After the end of the Boer War in 1902, a review of the Army took place and a Royal Commission reported on the Militia and Volunteers. The War Office was concerned over the different standards of efficiency, but had to concede that this was in the hands of individual commanding officers. Lieutenant-Colonel Allen of the 4th West Riding RGA (V) was one of five Volunteer officers invited to sit on a committee under Lord Raglan to consider the difficulties of the new efficiency regulations. Eventually, the Secretary for War in the Liberal Government of 1905, Richard Haldane, was given the task of preparing legislation for reform. His Territorial and Reserve Forces Act 1907 brought together the Volunteer and Yeomanry units to form the Territorial Force (TF), with the same home defence role as before, but, in addition, giving them the capability of acting as backup to the Regular Army if the need arose, with a full organisation of infantry divisions and mounted brigades, with supporting arms. In addition, the Act set up County Associations to help co-ordinate the work of the War Office and the new TF, and to recruit, house and administer the units.

=== West Yorkshire Divisional Artillery ===
The West Riding Territorial Association was responsible for the whole of the TF's West Riding Division, including its Divisional Artillery. (Note: The artillery component of a British infantry division during World War I was commanded by a brigadier-general and was effectively a brigade, but was never referred to as such because 'brigade' was the term used by the Royal Artillery to designate what was in most armies a battalion-sized unit.) The majority of TF artillery units transferred to the Royal Field Artillery (RFA), with a smaller number remaining as heavy artillery under the RGA. The heavy RGA battery at York was brought back from the East Riding Association, but the West Riding Association still needed to form some new units and subunits to complete the force, which was organised as follows:

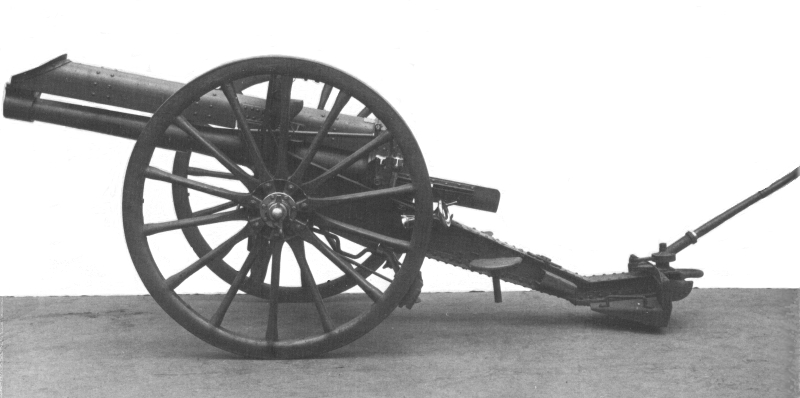
15-pounder field gun issued to TF units.

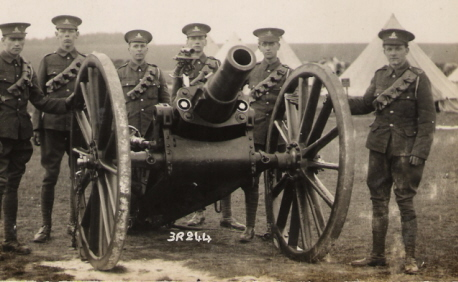
Territorial gunners training with a 5-inch howitzer before World War I.

- Divisional Artillery HQ: Red House, Marygate, York
- I West Riding Brigade, RFA – from 1st West Riding RGA (V)
  - Brigade HQ: Fenton Street, Leeds
  - 1st West Riding Battery, Fenton Street
  - 2nd West Riding Battery, Bramley
  - 3rd West Riding Battery, Fenton Street
  - 1st West Riding Brigade Ammunition Column, Fenton Street
- II West Riding Brigade, RFA– from 2nd West Riding RGA (V)
  - Brigade HQ:Valley Parade, Bradford
  - 4th West Riding Battery, Valley Parade
  - 5th West Riding Battery, Skircoat Road, Halifax
  - 6th West Riding Battery, Artillery Street, Heckmondwike
  - 2nd West Riding Brigade Ammunition Column, Valley Parade
- III West Riding Brigade, RFA – from 4th West Riding RGA (V)
  - Brigade HQ: Norfolk Barracks, Sheffield
  - 7th–9th West Riding Batteries, Norfolk Barracks
  - 3rd West Riding Brigade Ammunition Column, Norfolk Barracks
- IV West Riding (Howitzer) Brigade, RFA – new unit formed from part of 2nd Yorkshire (West Riding) Royal Engineers (V) and C Company, 3rd Volunteer Battalion, Duke of Wellington's Regiment
  - Brigade HQ: Nelson Street, Otley
  - 10th West Riding Battery, Otley
  - 11th West Riding Battery, East Parade, Ilkley
  - 4th West Riding Brigade Ammunition Column, Peel Place, Burley
- West Riding Heavy Battery, RGA – from part of 1st East Riding RGA (V), originally 3rd West Riding AVC
  - Battery HQ: Lumley Barracks, Burton Stone Lane, York
  - Battery Ammunition Column, York

Each RFA battery was equipped with four 15 pounder field guns or four 5-inch howitzers as appropriate; the RGA heavy battery retained its 4.7-inch guns. With the change to the smaller guns, steam tractors were no longer required and the drill halls had to be adapted to accommodate horses.

In addition, the 4th West Riding RGA (V) provided the personnel for a new West Riding Royal Horse Artillery at Wentworth Woodhouse, Rotherham, for the Yorkshire Mounted Brigade.

== World War I ==
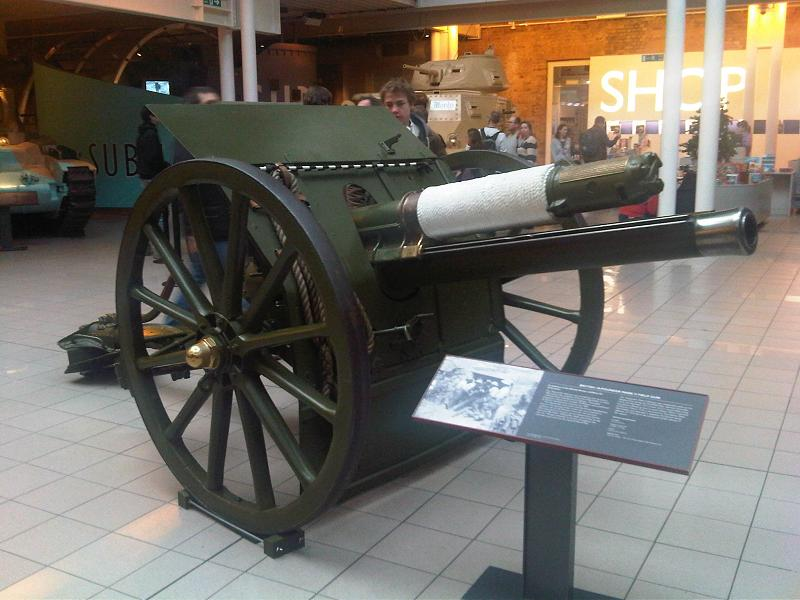
18-pounder field gun preserved at the Imperial War Museum.

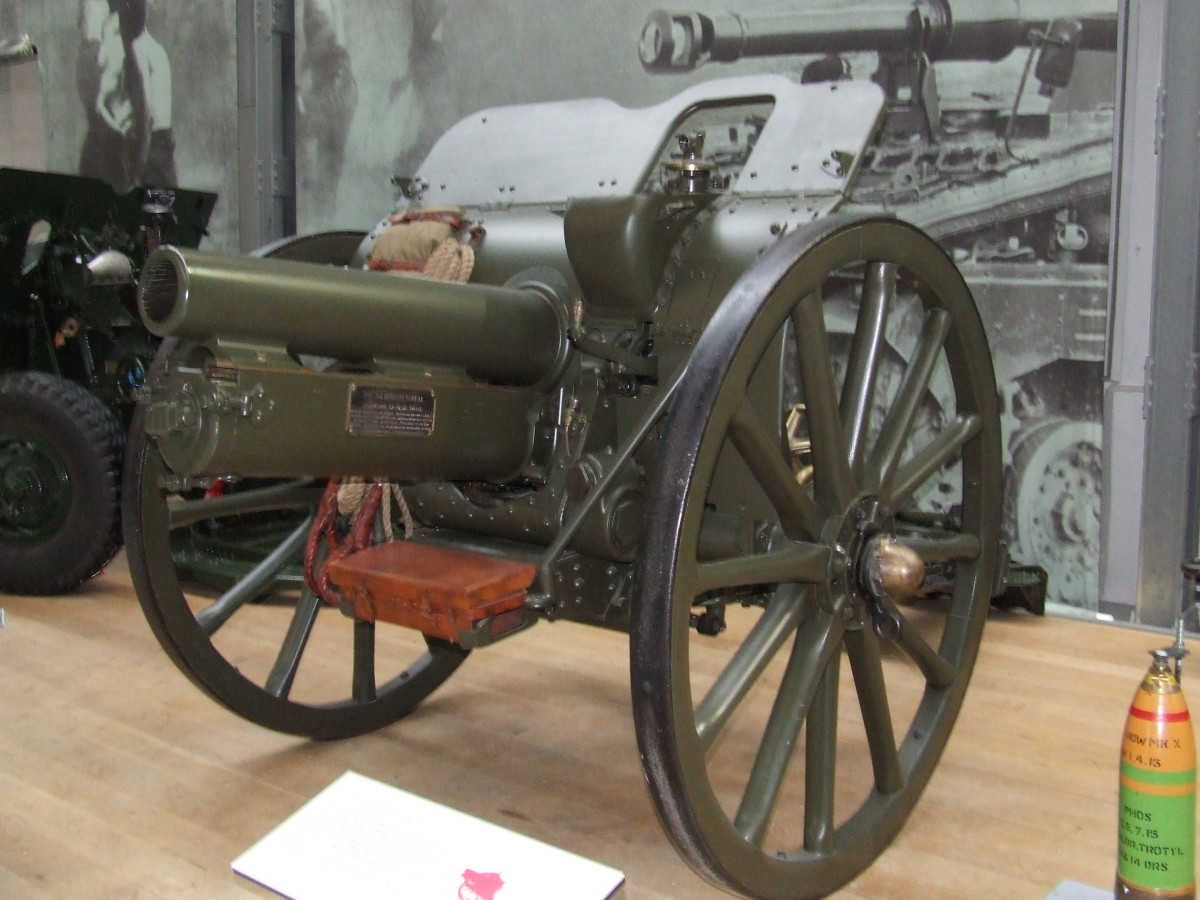
4.5-inch howitzer at the Royal Artillery Museum.

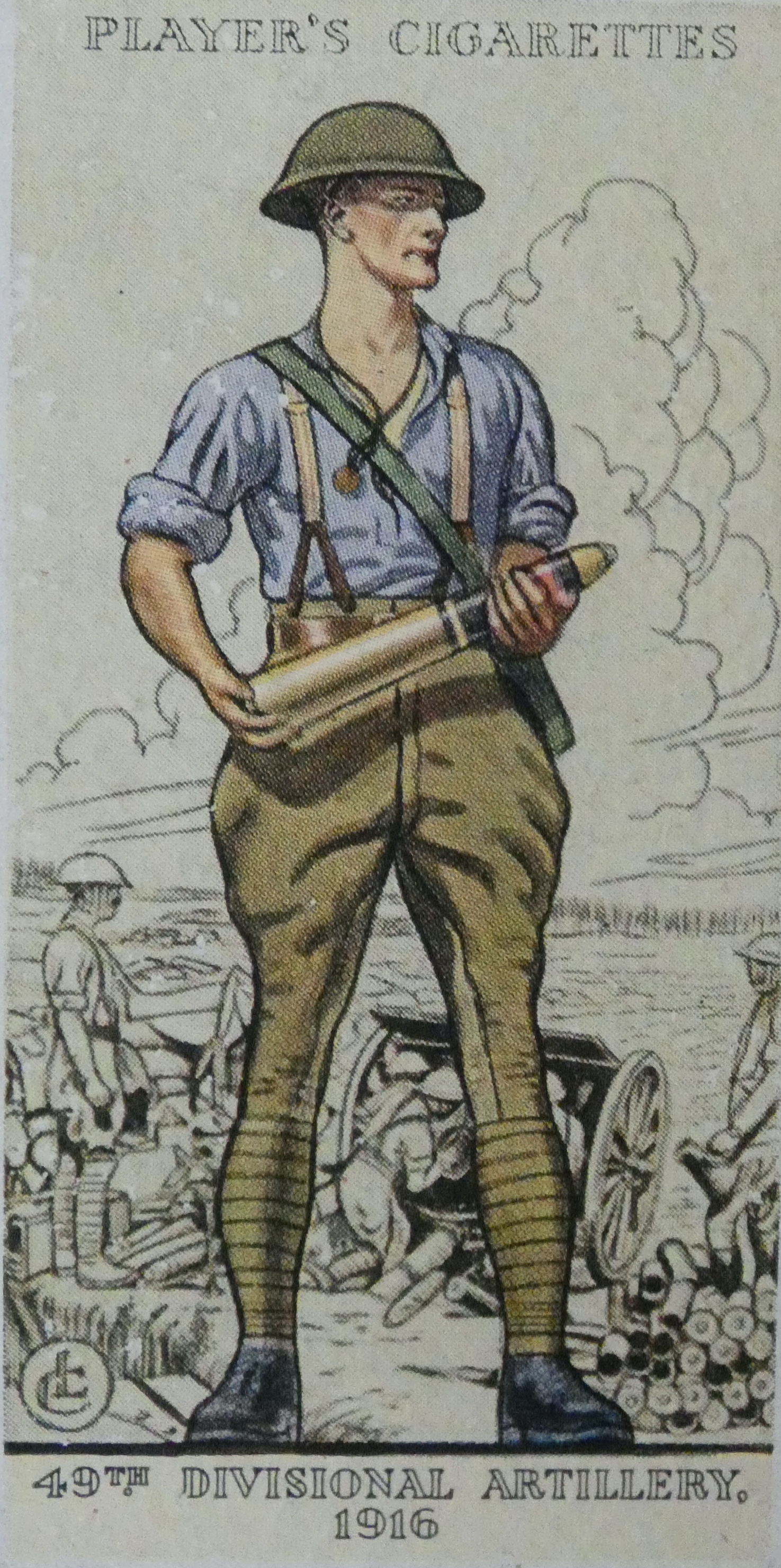

=== Mobilisation ===
During the Great War (1914–18), the West Riding brigades formed the divisional artillery for the 49th (West Riding) Division, going to France in 1915. Each formed a second line brigade (designated with a '2/' prefix) in the autumn of 1914, which then supported 62nd Division. In May 1916, all the TF RFA brigades were renumbered.

=== 49th (West Riding) Divisional Artillery ===
49th (West Riding) Divisional Artillery was organised as follows:

- 1/I West Riding Bde – became CCXLV (245) Bde
- 1/II West Riding Bde – became CCXLVI (246) Bde
- 1/III West Riding Bde – became CCXLVII (247) Bde; broken up February 1917
- 1/IV West Riding (H) Bde became CCXLVIII (248) Bde; broken up among 49th Divisional Artillery October 1916
- 49th (West Riding) Divisional Ammunition Column – formed after mobilisation; absorbed the brigade ammunition columns (BACs) May 1916
- 49th (West Riding) Trench Mortar Brigade
  - X/49, Y/49, Z/49 Medium TMBs – formed by 4 April 1916
  - V/49 Heavy TMB – formed 18 April 1916
  - W/49 Heavy TMB – formed 17 May 1916, absorbed by W/49 by 7 June 1917

Heavy artillery batteries did not serve with their original divisions. As the war progressed, sections and batteries were exchanged between field brigades to bring them up to a final establishment of three 6-gun 18-pounder field gun batteries and one 4.5-inch howitzer battery; this resulted in some brigades being broken up. Divisional artillery then consisted of two of these larger brigades, and the remaining brigades became Army Field Artillery (AFA) brigades.

The onset of Trench warfare revealed an urgent need for high angle mortars. During 1915, the BEF began forming ad hoc trench mortar batteries (TMBs) manned by a mixture of infantry and RFA gunners. At the end of the year, TMBs were defined as light, medium or heavy, with the light batteries (LTMBs) formed in infantry brigades and the medium and heavy forming part of the divisional artillery. 49th (WR) Divisional Artillery was assigned 34, 37 and 48 TMBs from December 1915 until it formed its own batteries. In February 1918, the mortars were reorganised into larger batteries: Z MTMB in each division was split between X and Y and the HTMBs became corps-level units, with W/49 joining X Corps. From July 1918, the divisional TMBs became wholly RFA units, the heavies becoming RGA units.

49th (WR) Division served on the Western Front from April 1915. It took part in the battles of Aubers Ridge (1915), the Somme (1916), the operations on the Flanders coast and the Battle of Poelcappelle (1917). In 1918 it fought through the Battle of the Lys and the final Hundred Days Offensive. It was demobilised in 1919.

=== 62nd (2nd West Riding) Divisional Artillery ===
62nd (2nd West Riding) Divisional Artillery was organised as follows:

- 2/I West Riding Bde – became CCCX (310) Bde
- 2/II West Riding Bde – became CCCXI (311) Bde; left division to become an AFA brigade January 1917
- 2/III West Riding Bde – became CCCXII (312) Bde
- 2/IV West Riding (H) Bde – broken up among 62nd Divisional Artillery May 1916
- 62nd (2nd West Riding) Divisional Ammunition Column – absorbed the BACs before embarking for France
- 62nd (2nd West Riding) Trench Mortar Brigade
  - X/62, Y/62 Medium TMBs
  - Z/62 Medium TMB – broken up between X and Y 13–18 February 1918
  - V/62 Heavy TMB – broken up 11 February 1918

After a long period of training hampered by lack of equipment, 62nd (2nd WR) Division served on the Western Front from January 1917. It followed the German retreat to the Hindenburg Line and took part in the subsequent actions. Later in the year it fought in the Battle of Cambrai. It was engaged in the German spring offensive of March 1918, and then through the Hundred Days Offensive. It was disbanded in 1919.

CCCXI Army Field Artillery Bde served with a wide variety of formations in 1917–18. It took part in the battles of Arras, Messines (with the Anzacs), and Passchendaele (with the Canadians). In 1918 it fought in the German spring offensive, and the final advance in Artois, ending the war under Canadian command.

== Interwar period ==
Following the War, the names of the Brigades reverted to their pre-war designations – 1st, 2nd and 3rd West Riding Brigades RFA when they were reformed in the reconstituted TF on 7 February 1920. The 4th West Riding Bde was not reformed: its batteries remained as howitzer batteries with the 1st and 2nd Brigades, while the former West Riding Royal Horse Artillery provided the fourth battery of the 3rd Brigade (from which it had emerged in 1908). In 1921, the TF was reorganised as the Territorial Army (TA) and the units were redesignated:

- 69th (West Riding) Brigade, RFA
  - HQ, Leeds
  - 273rd (1st West Riding) Battery, Leeds
  - 274th (2nd West Riding) Battery, Bramley
  - 275th (3rd West Riding) Battery, Leeds
  - 276th (11th West Riding) (Howitzer) Battery, Ilkley
- 70th (West Riding) Brigade, RFA
  - HQ, Bradford
  - 277th (4th West Riding) Battery, Bradford
  - 278th (5th West Riding) Battery, Halifax
  - 279th (6th West Riding) Battery, Bradford
  - 280th (10th West Riding) (Howitzer) Battery, Otley
- 71st (West Riding) Brigade, RFA
  - HQ, Sheffield
  - 281st (7th West Riding) Battery, Sheffield
  - 282nd (8th West Riding) Battery, Sheffield
  - 283rd (9th West Riding) Battery, Sheffield
  - 284th (12th West Riding) (Howitzer) Battery, Rotherham

The brigades once again provided the divisional artillery for 49th (WR) Division, which had also reformed in 1920. In 1924, the RFA and RGA were subsumed into the Royal Artillery (RA), and the word 'Field' was inserted into the titles of its brigades and batteries. In 1938, the RA modernised its nomenclature and a lieutenant-colonel's command was designated a 'regiment' rather than a 'brigade'; this applied to TA field brigades from 1 November 1938.

=== Post-Munich ===
The TA was doubled in size after the Munich Crisis, and regiments formed duplicates in 1939. Part of the reorganisation was that field regiments changed from four six-gun batteries to an establishment of two batteries, each of three four-gun troops. The West Riding Artillery reorganised as follows:

First Line (49th (West Riding) Divisional Artillery)

- 69th (West Riding) Field Regiment, RA
  - Regimental HQ (RHQ), Leeds
  - 273 (1st West Riding) Field Bty, Leeds
  - 274 (2nd West Riding) Field Bty, Bramley
- 70th (West Riding) Field Regiment, RA
  - RHQ, Bradford
  - 277 (4th West Riding) Field Bty, Bradford
  - 279 (6th West Riding) Field Bty, Bradford
- 71st (West Riding) Field Regiment, RA
  - RHQ, Sheffield
  - 281 (7th West Riding) Field Bty, Sheffield
  - 282 (8th West Riding) Field Bty, Sheffield

Duplicate (46th Divisional Artillery)

- 121st Field Regiment, RA
  - RHQ, Bramley
  - 275 (3rd West Riding) Field Bty, Leeds
  - 276 (11th West Riding) Field Bty, Ilkley
- 122nd Field Regiment, RA
  - RHQ, Halifax
  - 278 (5th West Riding) Field Bty, Halifax
  - 280 (10th West Riding) Field Bty, Otley
- 123rd Field Regiment, RA
  - RHQ, Sheffield
  - 283 (9th West Riding) Field Bty, Sheffield
  - 284 (12th West Riding) Field Bty, Rotherham

The duplicate regiments were authorised to adopt the '(West Riding)' subtitle on 17 February 1942.

== World War II ==
The 69th Field Regiment, as part of the 49th (West Riding) Infantry Division, served in garrisoning of Iceland for two years and later, after their return to the United Kingdom, took part in the invasion of Normandy in June 1944, shortly after the D-Day landings of 6 June. The regiment served with the 49th Division in the Normandy Campaign during the Battle for Caen, Operation Astonia, garrisoning The Island in the aftermath of the failure of Operation Market Garden, and the Liberation of Arnhem in 1945.

Originally with the 69th Field Regiment in the 49th (West Riding) Division, the 70th Field Regiment was sent to France in 1940 as part of the 52nd (Lowland) Infantry Division. When the British Expeditionary Force had to withdraw, the 70th returned to the United Kingdom via Cherbourg with all their guns, vehicles and equipment intact. They were later transferred to 46th Infantry Division and fought with them in the Tunisia Campaign and later in Italy and the Greek Civil War.

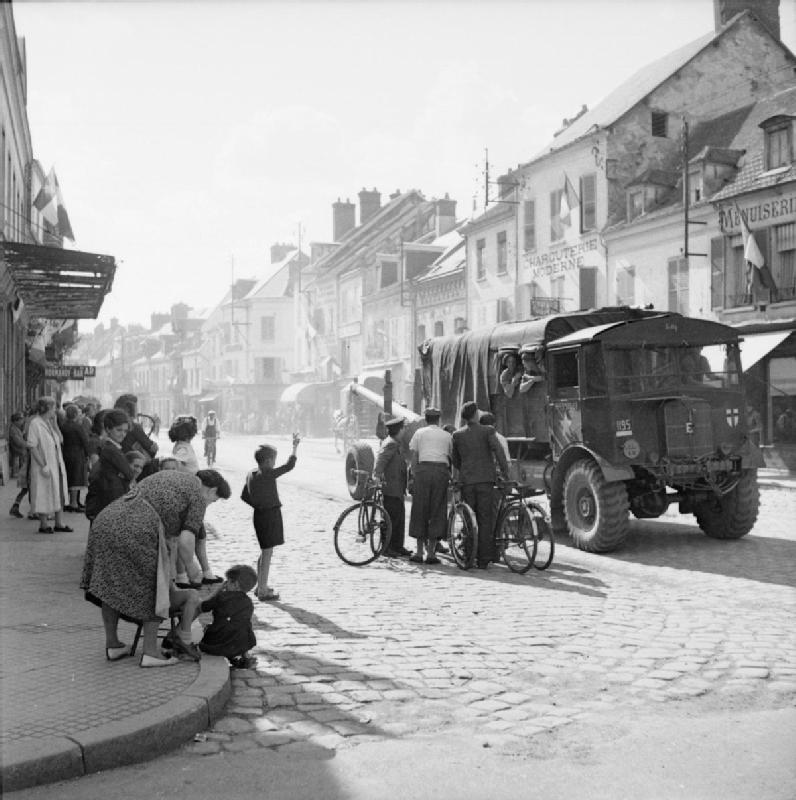
5.5-inch gun and AEC Matador artillery tractor of 121st Medium Regiment during operations to cross the River Seine at Vernon, 25 August 1944

The 121st Field Regiment was sent to Iraq in 1941, fought with the British Eighth Army in the North African Campaign and the American Fifth Army in the Italian Campaign before returning to the United Kingdom to take part in the Normandy invasion as a Medium Regiment with 5.5-inch Medium Guns.

The 122nd Field Regiment, after training in the United Kingdom, was sent out to the Far East in late 1941. The 122nd suffered 13 war casualties during the Malayan Campaign up until the naval base at Singapore surrendered in February 1942 after the Battle of Singapore. Thereafter, more than 200 died, mainly as a result of their treatment as prisoners of the Imperial Japanese Army.

A regimental history was assembled by Sergeant R.W. Morris and published in 1946; entitled '121 Field Medium Regiment Royal Artillery 1939–1946'. In 2023 it was established that no public library held a copy and a privately held copy was uplifted to a WWII history website, which is open to the public.

== Postwar ==
An honour, unique at the time for a TA unit, was conferred upon the 70th on 5 September 1945. They were granted the Freedom of the City of Bradford.

269th and 270th (West Riding) Field Regiments RA (TA) were reconstituted in the TA in Leeds and Bradford respectively on New Year's Day 1947. Both units were equipped with the 25 pounder self propelled gun (the Sexton), and both became part of 49th (West Riding) Armoured Division. In 1956, they were re-equipped with 25 pounder (towed), familiar to so many. When Anti-Aircraft Command was abolished in the mid-fifties, 269th absorbed 321 (West Riding) HAA Regiment and the 270th absorbed 584 LAA Regiment RA (6th West Yorkshire) without changing their titles (although the 270th did move their HQ from Valley Parade to 584's barracks at Belle Vue, Bradford).

To mark the centenary of the formation of the 1st Yorkshire (West Riding) Artillery Volunteer Corps, the Freedom of the City of Leeds was granted to the 269th on 3 February 1960. Shortly afterwards, the 269th and 270th amalgamated with each other to form the 249th (The West Riding Artillery) Field Regiment RA(TA), with headquarters at Carlton Barracks in Leeds and batteries at Leeds, Bramley and Bradford.

=== TAVR III ===
This reform saw the Regiment reorganised as The West Riding Regiment RA (Territorials) on 1 April 1967: but, by 1969, the Regiment was reduced to a cadre at Bradford (some of Q Battery was absorbed into E Company, The Yorkshire Volunteers; 272 (West Riding Artillery) Field Support Squadron, 73 Engineer Regiment RE(V) also formed at Bradford). In 1971, this cadre was expanded to become "A" (West Riding Artillery) Battery, 3rd Battalion Yorkshire Volunteers. On 1 April 1975, an independent observation post battery, 269 (West Riding) OP Battery RA (Volunteers), was formed at Leeds from the cadre (and the cadre disbanded), reviving the West Riding Artillery lineage in the Royal Artillery.

== Sources ==
- Maj A.F. Becke,History of the Great War: Order of Battle of Divisions, Part 2a: The Territorial Force Mounted Divisions and the 1st-Line Territorial Force Divisions (42–56), London: HM Stationery Office, 1935/Uckfield: Naval & Military Press, 2007, ISBN 1-847347-39-8.
- Maj A.F. Becke,History of the Great War: Order of Battle of Divisions, Part 2b: The 2nd-Line Territorial Force Divisions (57th–69th), with the Home-Service Divisions (71st–73rd) and 74th and 75th Divisions, London: HM Stationery Office, 1937/Uckfield: Naval & Military Press, 2007, ISBN 1-847347-39-8
- Maj A.F. Becke,History of the Great War: Order of Battle of Divisions, Part 4: The Army Council, GHQs, Armies, and Corps 1914–1918, London: HM Stationery Office, 1944/Uckfield: Naval & Military Press, 2007, ISBN 1-847347-43-6.
- Ian F.W. Beckett, Riflemen Form: A Study of the Rifle Volunteer Movement 1859–1908, Aldershot, The Ogilby Trusts, 1982, ISBN 0 85936-271 X.
- Corry, Lieutenant G. D.; Oglesby, Major R. B. (17 October 1950). "Report No 39: Operations of 1 Canadian Corps in North-West Europe, 15 March – 5 May 1945". National Defence and the Canadian Forces, Army Headquarters Reports 1948–1959. Archived from the original (PDF) on 19 July 2011.
- J.B.M. Frederick, Lineage Book of British Land Forces 1660–1978, Vol I, Wakefield: Microform Academic, 1984, ISBN 1-85117-007-3.
- J.B.M. Frederick, Lineage Book of British Land Forces 1660–1978, Vol II, Wakefield: Microform Academic, 1984, ISBN 1-85117-009-X.
- Norman E.H. Litchfield, The Territorial Artillery 1908–1988 (Their Lineage, Uniforms and Badges), Nottingham: Sherwood Press, 1992, ISBN 0-9508205-2-0.
- Norman Litchfield & Ray Westlake, The Volunteer Artillery 1859–1908 (Their Lineage, Uniforms and Badges), Nottingham: Sherwood Press, 1982, ISBN 0-9508205-0-4.
- Laurie Magnus, The West Riding Territorials in the Great War, London: Keegan Paul, Trench, Trubner, 1920//Uckfield: Naval & Military Press, 2004, ISBN 1-845740-77-7.
- Edward M. Spiers, The Army and Society 1815–1914, London: Longmans, 1980, ISBN 0-582-48565-7.
- War Office, Titles and Designations of Formations and Units of the Territorial Army, London: War Office, 7 November 1927 (RA sections also summarised in Litchfield, Appendix IV).

=== External links ===
- Chris Baker, The Long, Long Trail
- Craggs MC, Maj H. "70th Field Regiment Royal Artillery at Sedjenane, Tunisia in February–March 1943, the eyewitness account of Major Harry Craggs MC".
- The Drill Hall Project
- T.F. Mills, Land Forces of Britain, the Empire and Commonwealth – Regiments.org (archive site)
- Yorkshire Volunteers Regimental Association

=== Further reading ===
- Ackroyd, E. The Bradford Volunteer Artillery – 122 (WR) Field Regiment RA TA 1939 – 1942 / A freedom dearly bought.
- Douglas, J. The Bradford Volunteer Artillery – 70th (WR) Field Regiment RA TA 1939 – 1946.
- Morris, R. W. 121 Field/Medium Regiment 1939 – 46.
- Peacock MBE, R. T. P. The Bradford Volunteer Artillery – a Mini Archive 1914 – 1938.
- Seddon, W. The Leeds Volunteer Artillery.
- Wyatt, J. T. The Leeds Volunteer Artillery 1947 – 1971.
