= Arthur Benn =

British politician (1858–1937)

Baron Glenravel
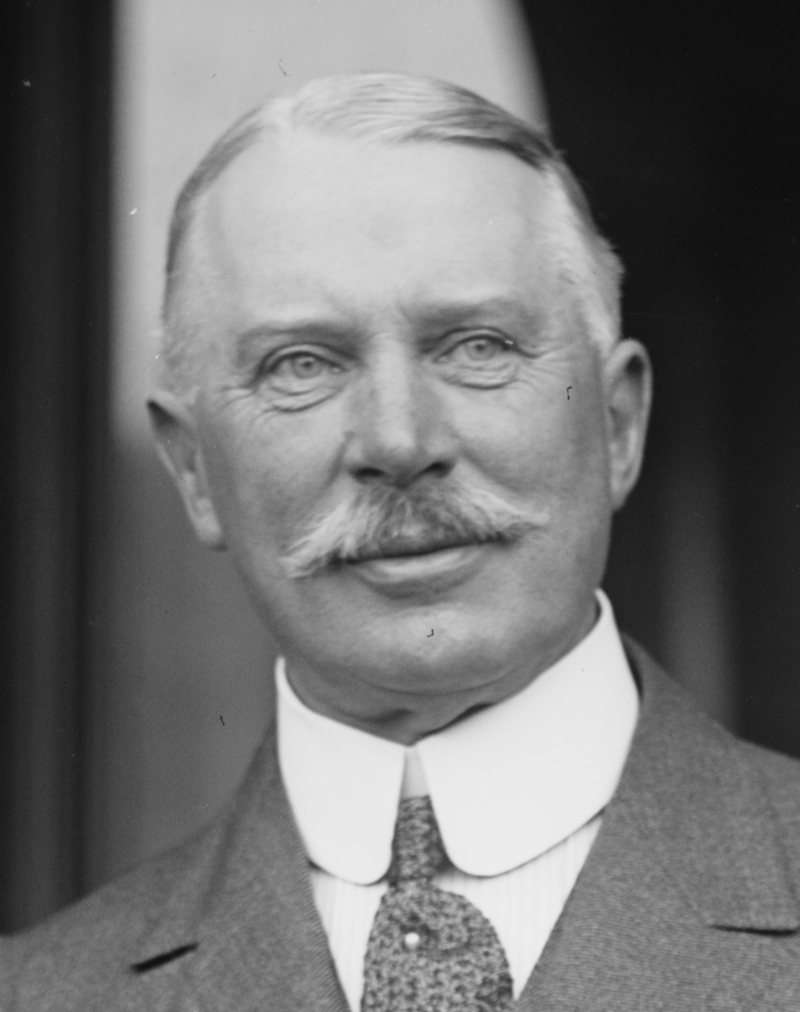
- Lord Glenravel

Member of the House of Lords
- In office 1 February 1936 – 13 June 1937

Member of Parliament for Sheffield Park
- In office 27 October 1931 – 14 November 1935
- Preceded by: George Lathan
- Succeeded by: George Lathan
- Majority: 10,609 (25.2%)

Member of Parliament for Plymouth Drake
- In office 14 December 1918 – 30 May 1929
- Preceded by: Constituency Established
- Succeeded by: James Moses

Member of Parliament for Plymouth
- In office 3 December 1910 – 14 December 1918 Serving with Waldorf Astor
- Preceded by: Charles Edward Mallet and Aneurin Williams
- Succeeded by: Constituency Abolished

Personal details
- Born: Arthur Shirley Benn; December 20, 1858
- Died: June 13, 1937 (aged 78)

Arthur Shirley Benn, 1st Baron Glenravel, KBE (20 December 1858 – 13 June 1937), known as Sir Arthur Benn, Bt, between 1926 and 1936, was a British businessman and politician.

== Early life ==
He was born on 20 December 1858, in Cork, Ireland, the son of Reverend John Watkins Benn. He received his formal education at Clifton College, then at Inner Temple.

== Business career ==
He became a managing director, then the British Vice-Consul to Mobile, Alabama.

== Political career ==
Benn became active in the Conservative Party, and stood in Battersea at the 1906 general election. In 1907, he was elected to London County Council, representing the equivalent seat, a post he held for four years. He stood for Parliament in Battersea again in January 1910. In December, he was instead elected at Plymouth.

In 1915 during the First World War he was a member of the House of Commons' 'Ammunition Committee', established by David Lloyd George as Minister of Munitions.

Benn moved to represent Plymouth Drake in 1918, and in the Birthday Honours that year was appointed to the Order of the British Empire as a Knight Commander (KBE). In 1921, he became the President of the Association of British Chambers of Commerce, a position he held until 1923, and also became the Chair of the National Unionist Association. On 19 October 1922, he spoke at the Carlton Club meeting.

In the 1926 Birthday Honours he was created a baronet, of Plymouth in the County of Devon. From 1927, he was the Director of the International Chamber of Commerce.

Benn lost his seat in 1929, and at the next general election in 1931 was elected for Sheffield Park, but then lost this seat in 1935. In 1936 he was raised to the peerage as Baron Glenravel, of Kensington in the County of London.

== Death ==
He died on 13 June 1937 at the age of 78, without issue, when the baronetcy and barony became extinct. His body was buried at Hanwell Cemetery in Ealing, London.

== Personal life ==
He married Alys Maria Luling, daughter of Florenz Augustus Luling of New Orleans and later of Mobile, Alabama, on 9 May 1888.

== Arms ==
Coat of arms of Arthur Benn
Notes Confirmed by Nevile Wilkinson, Ulster King of Arms, 30 June 1908. Crest On a wreath of the colours a tiger passant Argent gorged with a collar dancettee Gules charged with a trefoil as in the arms. Escutcheon Argent on a chevron indented Gules between three lions rampant Sable a trefoil slipped Or. Motto Courage Sans Peur

Parliament of the United Kingdom
Preceded by Charles Mallet; Aneurin Williams	Member of Parliament for Plymouth; December 1910 – 1918; With: Waldorf Astor	Constituency divided
New constituency	Member of Parliament for Plymouth Drake; 1918–1929	Succeeded by James John Hamlyn Moses
Preceded by George Lathan	Member of Parliament for Sheffield Park; 1931–1935	Succeeded by George Lathan
Peerage of the United Kingdom
New creation	Baron Glenravel; 1936–1937	Extinct
Baronetage of the United Kingdom
New creation	Baronet (of Bolton Gardens); 1926–1937	Extinct
