= 1942 Sheffield Park by-election =

UK Parliamentary by-election

The 1942 Sheffield Park by-election was held on 27 August 1942. The by-election was held due to the death of the incumbent Labour MP, George Lathan. It was won by the unopposed Labour candidate Thomas Burden.
