= Fred Mulley =

British politician

The Right Honourable The Lord Mulley PC
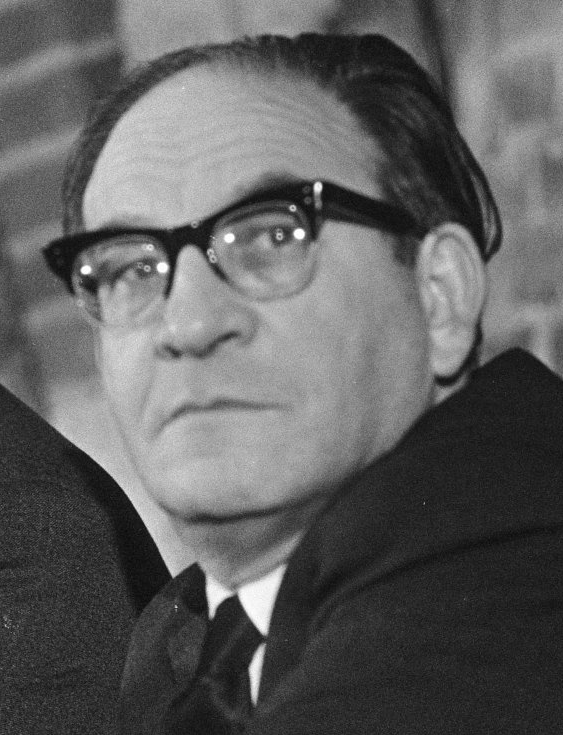
- Mulley in 1967, when a junior defence minister

Shadow Secretary of State for Defence
- In office 4 May 1979 – 14 June 1979
- Leader: James Callaghan
- Preceded by: Ian Gilmour
- Succeeded by: William Rodgers

Secretary of State for Defence
- In office 10 September 1976 – 4 May 1979
- Prime Minister: James Callaghan
- Preceded by: Roy Mason
- Succeeded by: Francis Pym

Secretary of State for Education and Science
- In office 5 March 1975 – 10 September 1976
- Prime Minister: Harold Wilson; James Callaghan
- Preceded by: Reg Prentice
- Succeeded by: Shirley Williams

Minister of Transport
- In office 7 March 1974 – 5 March 1975
- Prime Minister: Harold Wilson
- Preceded by: John Peyton (Transport Industries)
- Succeeded by: John Gilbert

Member of Parliament for Sheffield Park
- In office 23 February 1950 – 13 May 1983
- Preceded by: Thomas Burden
- Succeeded by: Constituency abolished

Personal details
- Born: Frederick William Mulley; 3 July 1918 Leamington Spa, Warwickshire, England
- Died: 15 March 1995 (aged 76) Lambeth, England
- Party: Labour
- Education: University of London; Christ Church, Oxford; St Catharine's College, Cambridge

Military service
- Allegiance: United Kingdom
- Branch/service: British Army
- Rank: Sergeant
- Unit: Worcestershire Regiment
- Battles/wars: World War II

Frederick William Mulley, Baron Mulley, PC (3 July 1918 – 15 March 1995) was a British Labour Party politician, barrister-at-law and economist.

== Early life ==
Mulley was born in Leamington Spa, Warwickshire, the son of William Mulley, a general labourer from The Fens, and his wife Mary (née Boiles), a domestic servant. He attended Warwick School on a scholarship between 1929 and 1936, leaving with the higher school certificate. As his father, who by this time was unemployed, could not afford to support him through university, Mulley instead became an accounts clerk under the national health insurance scheme. He served in the Worcestershire Regiment during the Second World War, reaching the rank of sergeant, but was captured in 1940 and spent five years as a prisoner of war in Germany. During this time he obtained a BSc in economics from the University of London as an external student and became a chartered secretary.

At the end of the war, Mulley received an adult scholarship to Christ Church, Oxford, graduating with a first-class degree in politics, philosophy and economics in 1947. After a brief spell as an economics fellow at St Catharine's College, Cambridge (1948–50), he trained as a barrister, being called to the Bar in 1954.

== Parliamentary career ==
Mulley had been a member of the Labour Party and the National Association of Clerks and Administrative Workers since 1936, and at the 1945 general election he unsuccessfully contested the constituency of Sutton Coldfield. He became Member of Parliament for Sheffield Park in 1950, a position he held until deselected by his local party prior to the 1983 general election, when his constituency disappeared in a redistribution of boundaries.

During a long career in politics Mulley held many ministerial positions, including Minister of Aviation (1965–67), Minister for Disarmament (1967–69), and Minister of Transport (1969–70, 1974–75). While at the Transport Ministry he believed it would be inappropriate to be seen to be a car driver; thus, although he owned an Austin Maxi, his wife was the sole user of it during this period.

In 1975 Harold Wilson brought him into the Cabinet as Secretary of State for Education and Science, and in 1976 became Secretary of State for Defence until the Labour Party's defeat at the 1979 general election.

Writing in the Oxford Dictionary of National Biography, former Cabinet minister Edmund Dell argued that Mulley was both a party loyalist of "unassailable" working-class credentials and a genuine Oxbridge intellectual, an unusual combination that made him valuable to Wilson and to Wilson's successor, James Callaghan.

== House of Lords ==
Mulley did not seek re-election at the House of Commons in 1983 and was created a life peer as Baron Mulley, of Manor Park in the City of Sheffield on 30 January 1984, after which and he held a variety of directorial positions.

== Legacy ==
A main road in the Lower Don Valley in Sheffield is named after him.

Parliament of the United Kingdom
Preceded by Thomas Burden	Member of Parliament for Sheffield Park; 1950–1983	Constituency abolished
Political offices
Preceded by John Peyton as Minister of State for Transport Industries	Minister of Transport; 1974–1975	Succeeded by John Gilbert
Preceded by Reg Prentice	Secretary of State for Education and Science; 1975–1976	Succeeded by Shirley Williams
Preceded by Roy Mason	Secretary of State for Defence; 1976–1979	Succeeded by Francis Pym
Preceded by Ian Gilmour	Shadow Secretary of State for Defence; 1979	Succeeded by William Rodgers
Party political offices
Preceded by Jim Callaghan	Chair of the Labour Party; 1974–1975	Succeeded by Tom Bradley
