= Plymouth Drake =

UK Parliament constituency (1918–1950, 1974–1997)

- Former borough constituency for the House of Commons
- Plymouth Drake in Devon, showing boundaries used from 1983 to 1997.
- County: Devon

1974–1997
- Seats: One
- Created from: Plymouth Sutton and Plymouth Devonport
- Replaced by: Plymouth Sutton

1918–1950
- Seats: One
- Created from: Plymouth
- Replaced by: Plymouth Sutton and Plymouth Devonport

Plymouth Drake was a borough constituency in the city of Plymouth, in Devon. It elected one Member of Parliament to the House of Commons of the Parliament of the United Kingdom by the first-past-the-post system of election.

== History ==
The first Drake constituency was created for the 1918 general election, and abolished for the 1950 general election. For most of this time it was held by the Conservative Party. It was a Labour gain in the Attlee landslide of 1945, although it had been held by Labour once before, in the 1929–31 Parliament.

The second incarnation of the constituency was created for the February 1974 general election. For the whole of its 23-year existence it was represented by just one MP, Dame Janet Fookes of the Conservative Party. It was always a marginal seat during this period, but Dame Janet managed to survive many strong challenges at each general election she fought, including winning with a majority of just 34 in October 1974 – making Drake the most marginal Conservative seat at that election. She served as a Deputy Speaker of the House to Betty Boothroyd from 1992 until she retired from the Commons in 1997.

The constituency was abolished for the 1997 general election, with its wards being transferred to the redrawn constituency of Plymouth Sutton, which was gained by the Labour Party in the Blair landslide of that year. Most of the territory of Drake is now covered by the constituency of Plymouth Sutton and Devonport.

== Boundaries ==
1918–1950: The County Borough of Plymouth wards of Drake, Mount Edgcumbe, Mutley, Pennycross, St Peter, Stoke, and Valletort.

1974–1983: The County Borough of Plymouth wards of Compton, Drake, Honicknowle, Pennycross, Tamerton, Trelawny, and Whitleigh.

1983–1997: The City of Plymouth wards of Compton, Drake, St Peter, Stoke, Sutton, and Trelawny.

In its 1918 and 1983 incarnations the constituency included Plymouth city centre, which was transferred in 1997 to Plymouth Sutton and in 2010 to Plymouth Sutton and Devonport.

== Members of Parliament ==
=== MPs 1918–1950 ===
| Election | Member | Party |
|---|---|---|
| 1918 | Arthur Benn | Conservative |
| 1929 | James Moses | Labour |
| 1931 | Frederick Guest | Conservative |
| 1937 by-election | Henry Guest | Conservative |
| 1945 | Hubert Medland | Labour |
| 1950 | constituency abolished | |

=== MPs 1974–1997 ===
| Election | Member | Party |
|---|---|---|
| Feb 1974 | Janet Fookes | Conservative |
| 1997 | constituency abolished: see Plymouth Sutton | |

== Election results ==
=== Elections in the 1910s ===
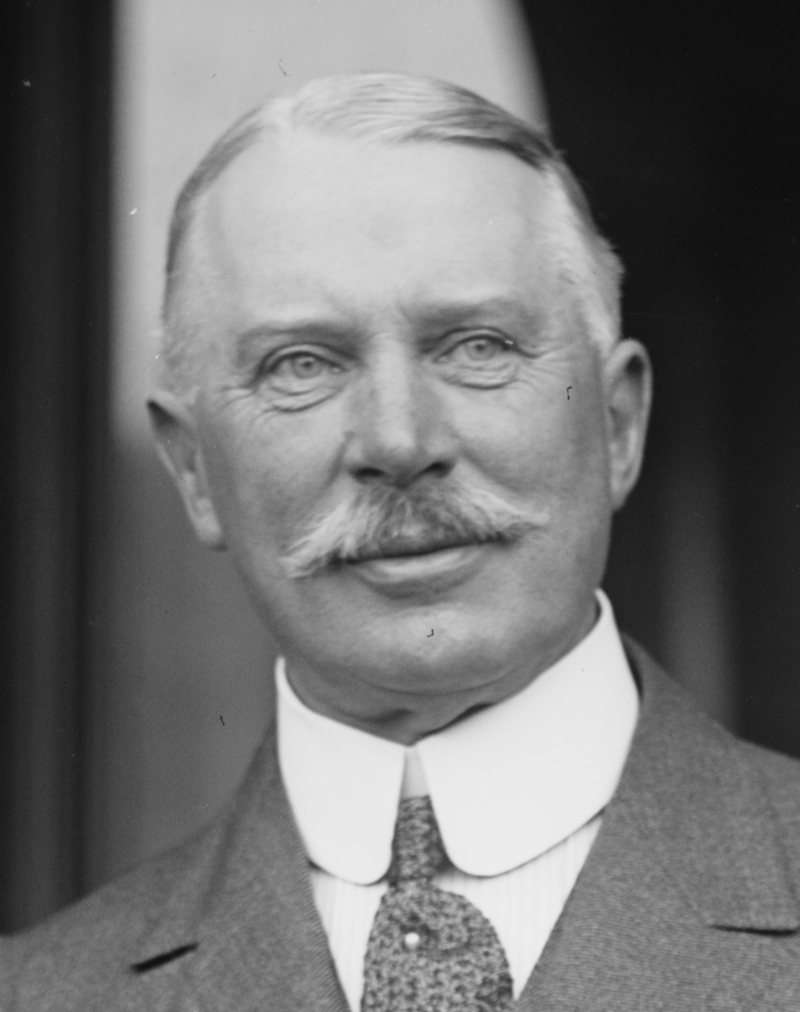
Arthur Benn

General election 1918: Plymouth Drake
| Party | | Candidate | Votes | % |
|---|---|---|---|---|
| C | Unionist | Arthur Benn | 17,188 | 73.4 |
| | Liberal | Thomas Dobson | 6,225 | 26.6 |
| Majority | | | 10,963 | 46.8 |
| Turnout | | | 23,413 | |
| Registered electors | | | | |
| | Unionist win (new seat) | | | |
C indicates candidate endorsed by the coalition government.

=== Elections in the 1920s ===
General election 1922: Plymouth Drake
| Party | Candidate | Votes | % | ±% |
|---|---|---|---|---|
| Unionist | Arthur Benn | 11,698 | 43.9 | –29.5 |
| Labour | James Gorman | 8,359 | 31.4 | New |
| Liberal | Samuel Robins | 6,594 | 24.7 | –1.9 |
| Majority | | 3,339 | 12.5 | –34.3 |
| Turnout | | 26,651 | 74.4 | |
| Registered electors | | 35,845 | | |
| Unionist hold | | Swing | | |

General election 1923: Plymouth Drake
| Party | Candidate | Votes | % | ±% |
|---|---|---|---|---|
| Unionist | Arthur Benn | 12,345 | 43.7 | −0.2 |
| Labour | James Moses | 11,849 | 41.9 | +10.5 |
| Liberal | Edward Ernest Henry Atkin | 4,082 | 14.4 | −10.3 |
| Majority | | 496 | 1.8 | −10.7 |
| Turnout | | 28,276 | 77.9 | |
| Registered electors | | | | |
| Unionist hold | | Swing | -5.3 | |

General election 1924: Plymouth Drake
| Party | Candidate | Votes | % | ±% |
|---|---|---|---|---|
| Unionist | Arthur Benn | 14,669 | 48.1 | +4.4 |
| Labour | James Moses | 12,161 | 39.9 | −2.0 |
| Liberal | Solomon Stephens | 3,645 | 12.0 | −2.4 |
| Majority | | 2,508 | 8.2 | +6.4 |
| Turnout | | 30,475 | | |
| Registered electors | | | | |
| Unionist hold | | Swing | | |

General election 1929: Plymouth Drake
| Party | Candidate | Votes | % | ±% |
|---|---|---|---|---|
| Labour | James Moses | 16,684 | 44.3 | +4.4 |
| Unionist | Arthur Benn | 14,673 | 39.0 | −9.1 |
| Liberal | Hugh MacDonald Pratt | 6,309 | 16.7 | +4.7 |
| Majority | | 2,011 | 5.3 | N/A |
| Turnout | | 37,666 | 80.5 | |
| Registered electors | | | | |
| Labour gain from Unionist | | Swing | | |

=== Elections in the 1930s ===
General election 1931: Plymouth Drake
| Party | Candidate | Votes | % | ±% |
|---|---|---|---|---|
| Conservative | Frederick Guest | 25,063 | 66.4 | +27.4 |
| Labour | James Moses | 12,669 | 33.6 | −10.7 |
| Majority | | 12,394 | 32.8 | N/A |
| Turnout | | 37,732 | 79.6 | −0.9 |
| Registered electors | | 47,388 | | |
| Conservative gain from Labour | | Swing | | |

General election 1935: Plymouth Drake
| Party | Candidate | Votes | % | ±% |
|---|---|---|---|---|
| Conservative | Frederick Guest | 21,446 | 58.3 | −8.1 |
| Labour | James Moses | 15,368 | 41.7 | +8.1 |
| Majority | | 6,078 | 16.5 | −16.3 |
| Turnout | | 36,814 | 74.8 | −4.8 |
| Registered electors | | 49,194 | | |
| Conservative hold | | Swing | | |

1937 Plymouth Drake by-election
| Party | Candidate | Votes | % | ±% |
|---|---|---|---|---|
| Conservative | Henry Guest | 15,778 | 58.82 | |
| Labour | Geoffrey Garratt | 11,044 | 41.18 | |
| Majority | | 4,734 | 17.64 | |
| Turnout | | 26,822 | | |
| Registered electors | | | | |
| Conservative hold | | Swing | | |

=== Elections in the 1940s ===
General Election 1939–40:

Another General Election was required to take place before the end of 1940. The political parties had been making preparations for an election to take place and by the Autumn of 1939, the following candidates had been selected;

- Conservative: Henry Guest
- Labour: Leonard Matters

General election 1945: Plymouth Drake
| Party | Candidate | Votes | % | ±% |
|---|---|---|---|---|
| Labour | Hubert Medland | 15,070 | 50.9 | +9.1 |
| Conservative | Henry Guest | 12,871 | 43.4 | –14.8 |
| Common Wealth | Edgar Trout | 1,681 | 5.7 | New |
| Majority | | 2,199 | 7.4 | N/A |
| Turnout | | 29,622 | 71.6 | –3.2 |
| Registered electors | | 41,380 | | |
| Labour gain from Conservative | | Swing | +12.0 | |

=== Elections in the 1970s ===
1970 notional result
| Party | Vote | % |
|---|---|---|
| Conservative | 19,800 | 51.0 |
| Labour | 19,000 | 49.0 |
| Turnout | 38,800 | 71.7 |
| Electorate | 54,119 | |

General election February 1974: Plymouth Drake
| Party | Candidate | Votes | % | ±% |
|---|---|---|---|---|
| Conservative | Janet Fookes | 18,417 | 42.8 | –8.2 |
| Labour | FK Taylor | 15,806 | 36.8 | –12.2 |
| Liberal | Maureen Castle | 8,784 | 20.4 | New |
| Majority | | 2,611 | 6.1 | +4.0 |
| Turnout | | 43,007 | 78.0 | +6.3 |
| Registered electors | | 55,109 | | |
| Conservative hold | | Swing | +2.0 | |

General election October 1974: Plymouth Drake
| Party | Candidate | Votes | % | ±% |
|---|---|---|---|---|
| Conservative | Janet Fookes | 17,287 | 41.3 | −1.6 |
| Labour | BW Fletcher | 17,253 | 41.2 | +4.4 |
| Liberal | Maureen Castle | 7,354 | 17.6 | −2.9 |
| Majority | | 34 | 0.1 | −6.0 |
| Turnout | | 41,894 | 75.4 | −2.6 |
| Registered electors | | 55,556 | | |
| Conservative hold | | Swing | −3.0 | |

General election 1979: Plymouth Drake
| Party | Candidate | Votes | % | ±% |
|---|---|---|---|---|
| Conservative | Janet Fookes | 21,759 | 50.6 | +9.3 |
| Labour | BW Fletcher | 17,515 | 40.7 | −0.5 |
| Liberal | Anthony Puttick | 3,452 | 8.0 | −9.5 |
| National Front | C Bradbury | 279 | 0.7 | New |
| Majority | | 4,244 | 9.9 | +9.8 |
| Turnout | | 43,005 | 77.2 | +1.8 |
| Registered electors | | 55,711 | | |
| Conservative hold | | Swing | +4.9 | |

1979 notional result
| Party | Vote | % |
|---|---|---|
| Conservative | 21,917 | 53.9 |
| Labour | 15,220 | 37.4 |
| Liberal | 3,205 | 7.9 |
| Others | 341 | 0.8 |
| Turnout | 40,683 | |
| Electorate | | |

=== Elections in the 1980s ===
General election 1983: Plymouth Drake
| Party | Candidate | Votes | % | ±% |
|---|---|---|---|---|
| Conservative | Janet Fookes | 19,718 | 50.7 | –3.2 |
| SDP | Will Fitzgerald | 11,133 | 28.6 | +20.7 |
| Labour | Sally Creswell | 7,921 | 20.3 | −17.1 |
| BNP | C Bradbury | 163 | 0.4 | –0.4 |
| Majority | | 8,585 | 22.1 | +5.6 |
| Turnout | | 38,935 | 74.3 | |
| Registered electors | | 52,383 | | |
| Conservative hold | | Swing | −12.0 | |

General election 1987: Plymouth Drake
| Party | Candidate | Votes | % | ±% |
|---|---|---|---|---|
| Conservative | Janet Fookes | 16,195 | 41.3 | –9.3 |
| SDP | David Astor | 13,070 | 33.3 | +4.7 |
| Labour | David Jamieson | 9,451 | 24.1 | +3.8 |
| Green | Tracey Barber | 493 | 1.3 | New |
| Majority | | 3,125 | 8.0 | –14.1 |
| Turnout | | 39,209 | 76.6 | +2.3 |
| Registered electors | | 51,186 | | |
| Conservative hold | | Swing | –7.0 | |

=== Elections in the 1990s ===
General election 1992: Plymouth Drake
| Party | Candidate | Votes | % | ±% |
|---|---|---|---|---|
| Conservative | Janet Fookes | 17,075 | 43.7 | +2.4 |
| Labour Co-op | Peter Telford | 15,062 | 38.6 | +14.5 |
| Liberal Democrats | Valerie Cox | 5,893 | 15.1 | −18.2 |
| SDP | DM Stanbury | 476 | 1.2 | N/A |
| Green | AE Harrison | 441 | 1.1 | −0.1 |
| Natural Law | TJ Pringle | 95 | 0.2 | New |
| Majority | | 2,013 | 5.2 | −2.8 |
| Turnout | | 39,042 | 75.6 | −1.0 |
| Registered electors | | 51,667 | | |
| Conservative hold | | Swing | –6.0 | |

== See also ==
- List of parliamentary constituencies in Devon
