= Sir Henry Stephenson, 1st Baronet =

British Liberal politician and businessman

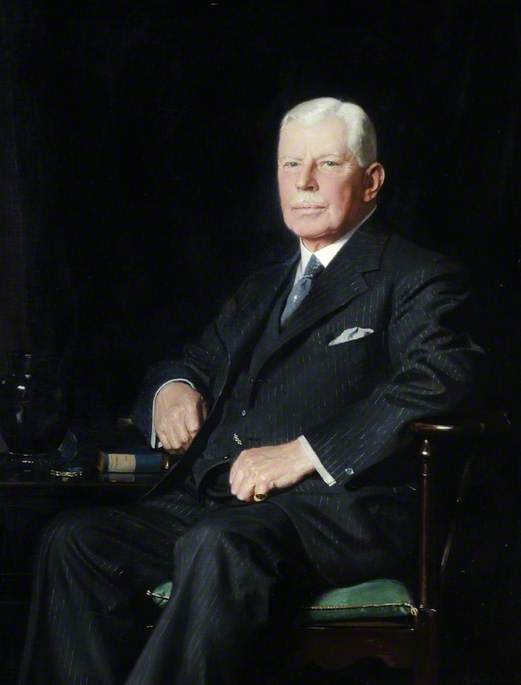
Sir Henry Kenyon Stephenson (1865–1947), Treasurer of the University of Sheffield By Howard Somerville (1873–1952)

Sir Henry Kenyon Stephenson, 1st Baronet DSO (16 August 1865 – 20 September 1947) was a British Liberal politician and businessman. He was the founding Treasurer, and later Pro-Chancellor, of the University of Sheffield. His father was Henry Stephenson.

== Career ==
Stephenson was born into a family of Typefounders in Sheffield. He became the chairman and managing director of Stephenson, Blake & Co Ltd, (1927) and later the Chair of the Sheffield Gas Company. He became the treasurer of the University College of Sheffield, and later the founding treasurer of its successor, the University of Sheffield.

Stephenson joined the Liberal Party and was elected to Sheffield City Council, becoming lord mayor in 1908–09 and again in 1910–11. In 1910, he also became the pro-chancellor of the University of Sheffield, succeeding Sir Frederick Mappin.

He had been an officer in the Territorial Force for many years and was Sheffield University's representative on the West Riding Territorial Association. He had been awarded the Volunteer Decoration, held the substantive rank of major from 1898 and the honorary rank of lieutenant-colonel. On the outbreak of World War I he was officer commanding 8th West Riding Battery in the III West Riding Brigade, Royal Field Artillery (the 'Sheffield Artillery'). Appointed to command the 1/IV West Riding Brigade, RFA, he took it to the Western Front in April 1915. He was awarded the Distinguished Service Order and twice Mentioned in dispatches.

At the 1918 general election, he became the first Member of Parliament for the Sheffield Park constituency, holding the seat as a National Liberal in 1922, but dropping to a distant third place in 1923. He served as High Sheriff of Derbyshire in 1932. He also served as Master Cutler in 1919 and later retired to Hassop Hall. In 1936 he was created a Baronet, of Hassop Hall in the County of Derby.

== Family ==
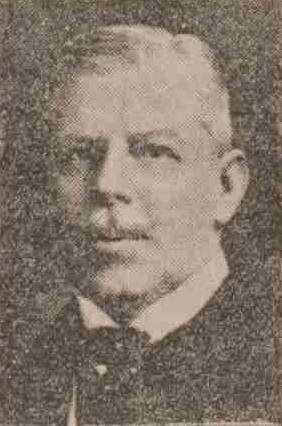

On 10 January 1894 he married Frances, eldest daughter of Major William Blake of Mylnhurst, Eccleshall, Sheffield. They had eight children:

- Sir Henry Francis Blake Stephenson, 2nd Baronet, born 3 December 1895
- William Raymond Shirecliffe Stephenson, born 27 August 1898
- Percival John Parker Stephenson, born 18 May 1900
- Charles Eustace Kenyon Stephenson, born 7 September 1903
- Evelyn Mary Stephenson, married 5 April 1923 Anthony Henry Mather Jackson
- Helen Millicent Frances Stephenson
- Cynthia Margaret Stephenson
- Emma Letitia Gertrude Stephenson, married 25 October 1941 Group Captain Philip Charles Fenner Lawton, DFC

Sir Henry died on 20 September 1947 and was succeeded by his eldest son.

Parliament of the United Kingdom
New constituency	Member of Parliament for Sheffield Park; 1918–1923	Succeeded by Richard Storry Deans
Baronetage of the United Kingdom
New creation	Baronet (of Hassop Hall); 1936–1947	Succeeded by Henry Francis Blake Stephenson
