= George Lathan =

British trade unionist and politician (1875–1942)

George Lathan (5 August 1875 – 14 June 1942) was a British trade unionist and politician. He was the Member of Parliament (MP) for Sheffield Park from 1929 to 1931 and from 1935 until his death.

Lathan worked on the railways where he became an active trade unionist and joined the Independent Labour Party. He became president of the Railway Clerks Association from 1906 until 1912, when he became its chief assistant secretary, a post he held until 1937.

Lathan also joined the Labour Party, and at the 1918 general election, stood unsuccessfully in Watford. From 1921 until 1936, Lathan was a member of the Railways National Wages Board. From 1921 until 1937, he was the president of the National Federation of Professional Workers.

Lathan was a parliamentary candidate at successive general elections. In 1922 he was defeated in Enfield, then in 1923 and 1924 he stood in Sheffield Park, finally winning the seat in 1929. He lost the seat in 1931, but retook it in 1935. He served as the chairman of the Labour Party National Executive Committee from 1931–1932 and party treasurer from 1936 until his death.

== Sources ==
- Michael Stenton and Stephen Lees, Who's Who of British MPs: Volume III, 1919-1945
- Single or Return - the official history of the Transport Salaried Staffs' Association

Parliament of the United Kingdom
Preceded by Richard Storry Deans	Member of Parliament for Sheffield Park; 1929–1931	Succeeded by Arthur Benn
Preceded by Arthur Benn	Member of Parliament for Sheffield Park; 1935–1942	Succeeded by Thomas Burden
Trade union offices
Preceded by William J. West	President of the Railway Clerks Association; 1906–1912	Succeeded by Herbert Romeril
Preceded by ?	Chief Assistant Secretary of the Railway Clerks Association; 1912–1937	Succeeded by Fred Simpson
Preceded by E. H. Walker	President of the National Federation of Professional Workers; 1921 – 1937	Succeeded by George Walker Thomson
Party political offices
Preceded by Stanley Hirst	Chair of the Labour Party; 1931–1932	Succeeded by Joseph Compton
Preceded by Arthur Henderson	Treasurer of the Labour Party; 1936–1942	Succeeded by Arthur Greenwood
