= Thomas Burden, 1st Baron Burden =

British politician (1885–1970)

Thomas William Burden, 1st Baron Burden CBE (29 January 1885 – 27 May 1970), was a British Labour Party politician and church official.

Burden was the son of Thomas Burden, mayor of East Ham. He was born in Mile End, and was educated at the London School of Economics. In 1909, he became the chair of the Poplar Labour League, then became its chair, serving until 1922. He joined the Railway Clerks' Association, and from 1916 served on its executive committee. From 1921, he was on the executive of the London Labour Party, and also of the Workers' Educational Association. He was also active in the Fabian Society and the Independent Labour Party.

In 1942, Burden was elected to the House of Commons as the Member of Parliament (MP) for Sheffield Park, a seat he held until 1950. He was also Second Church Estates Commissioner from 1945 to 1950 and a Member of the House of Laity of the Church Assembly from 1947 to 1950. On 1 February 1950 he was raised to the peerage as Baron Burden, of Hazlebarrow in the County of Derby. From 1950 to 1951 he served as a Lord-in-waiting in the Labour Government of Clement Attlee.

Lord Burden married Augusta, daughter of David Sime, in 1910. He died in May 1970, aged 85, and was succeeded in the barony by his son Philip. Lady Burden died in 1976.

== Notes ==
Parliament of the United Kingdom
Preceded by George Lathan	Member of Parliament for Sheffield Park; 1942 – 1950	Succeeded by Fred Mulley
Peerage of the United Kingdom
New creation	Baron Burden; 1950–1970	Succeeded by Philip William Burden
