= Janet Fookes =

British politician (born 1936)

The Right Honourable The Baroness Fookes DBE DL
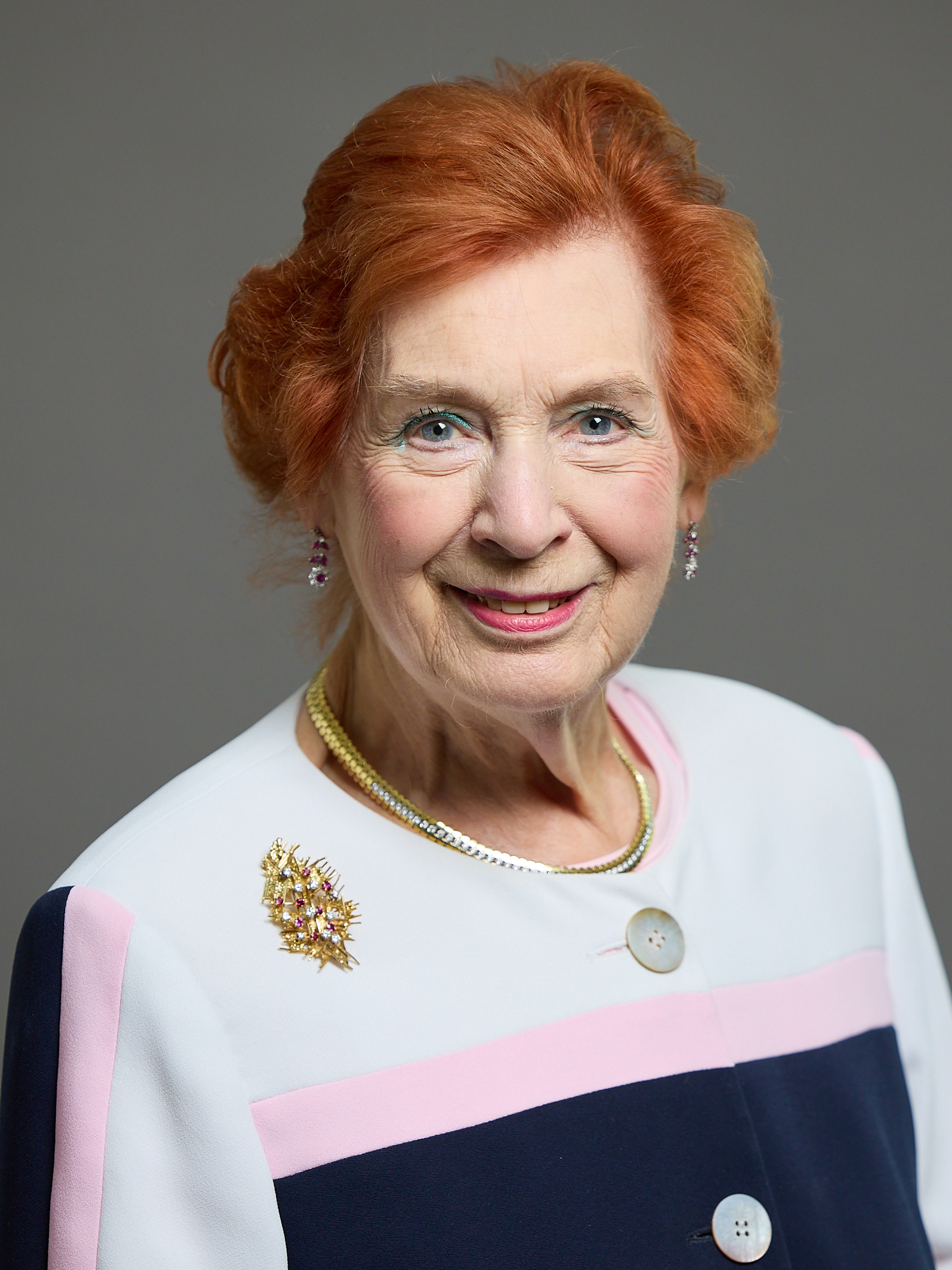
- Official portrait, 2025

Deputy Speaker of the House of Lords
- Incumbent
- Assumed office 9 December 2002

Deputy Speaker of the House of Commons Second Deputy Chair of Ways and Means
- In office 27 April 1992 – 14 May 1997
- Speaker: Betty Boothroyd
- Preceded by: Betty Boothroyd
- Succeeded by: Michael Lord

Member of the House of Lords
- Lord Temporal
- Life peerage 30 September 1997

Member of Parliament for Plymouth Drake
- In office 28 February 1974 – 8 April 1997
- Preceded by: Constituency created
- Succeeded by: Constituency abolished

Member of Parliament for Merton and Morden
- In office 18 June 1970 – 8 February 1974
- Preceded by: Humphrey Atkins
- Succeeded by: Constituency abolished

Personal details
- Born: 21 February 1936 (age 90)
- Party: Conservative

Janet Evelyn Fookes, Baroness Fookes, DBE, DL (born 21 February 1936) is a British politician. A member of the Conservative Party, she is a life peer in the House of Lords. She was previously a member of the House of Commons from 1970 to 1997, representing the constituencies of Merton and Morden (1970–74) and Plymouth Drake (1974–97). She was a Deputy Speaker of the House of Commons from 1992 to 1997, and presently is a Deputy Speaker in the House of Lords.

== Biography ==
Fookes was educated at Royal Holloway College, University of London. She worked as a teacher from 1958 to 1970. She served as a Councillor on Hastings Borough Council from 1960 to 1961, and 1963–70.

Fookes was elected a Member of Parliament (MP) representing Merton and Morden in 1970. When this constituency was abolished, she was elected MP for Plymouth Drake in 1974. Drake was never a safe seat, but Fookes managed to survive many strong challenges in each general election she fought, including winning by a majority of just 34 at the October 1974 general election. She served as one of three Deputy Speakers of the House of Commons from 1992 to 1997. She retired from the House of Commons in 1997, when the number of Plymouth seats fell from three to two, after 27 years as an MP: as she humorously put it, "longer than a life sentence".

Fookes served on the Council of the RSPCA 1975–92, and was its chair from 1979 to 1981. She was also a member of the Commonwealth War Graves Commission (1987–97). She is an Ambassador for unemployment charity, Tomorrow's People Trust.

== Honours ==
On 30 September 1997, Fookes was made a Life Peer as Baroness Fookes, of Plymouth in the County of Devon.

Fookes had previously been made a Dame Commander of the Order of the British Empire (DBE) in the 1989 New Year's Honours, and was appointed as a Deputy Lieutenant of County of East Sussex on 30 August 2001. This gave her the Post Nominal Letters "DL" for Life. She was moved to the retired list on 21 February 2011 upon reaching the Mandatory retirement age of 75.

== Arms ==
Coat of arms of Janet Fookes
Coronet A Coronet of a Baroness Escutcheon Sable four Towers in cross their bases conjoined Argent between four Fuchsias in saltire Stamens outwards Or Supporters On either side a Cat statant erect Sable gorged with a Naval Crown attached thereto a Chain reflexed over the back Or Motto Armaturam Dei Induite ("Put on the whole armour of God") Orders Order of the British Empire circlet (Appointed DBE 1989)

== Bibliography ==
- Times Guide to the House of Commons editions 1970–1992

Parliament of the United Kingdom
Preceded by Humphrey Atkins	Member of Parliament for Merton and Morden; 1970 – Feb 1974	Constituency abolished
New constituency	Member of Parliament for Plymouth Drake; Feb 1974 – 1997	Constituency abolished
