= James John Hamlyn Moses =

Mayor of Plymouth
- In office 1926–1927
- Preceded by: J. A. Bellamy
- Succeeded by: Hubert M. Medland

Member of Parliament for Plymouth Drake
- In office 30 May 1929 – 8 October 1931
- Preceded by: Arthur Benn
- Succeeded by: Freddie Guest

Personal details
- Born: 14 August 1873 Dartmouth, Devon, England
- Died: 28 May 1946 (aged 72)
- Party: Labour

James John Hamlyn Moses (14 August 1873 – 28 May 1946) was an English politician who served as mayor and later MP for Plymouth.

== Personal life ==
Moses was born in Dartmouth, Devon, the son of James J. H. Moses, a shipwright, and Susannah L. Peek. He was educated at the Board School, Dartmouth and started work part-time at the age of nine as a newspaper boy. He became a full-time errand boy at the age of thirteen. He took an apprenticeship in the trade of shipbuilding at fifteen. He entered HM Dockyard, Devonport in 1895. He married Agnes Ferris in 1897. He lived at 95 Alexandra Road, Devonport. He was a temperance worker and local preacher. He was Methodist from 1891.

== Political career ==
Moses became a Member of the Devonport Borough Council in 1911, the Council of Greater Plymouth in 1914, and an Alderman in 1921. He then became Borough Magistrate in 1918, Mayor of Plymouth in 1926–27 and Devon County Magistrate in 1927. He was Member of the Executive Committee of the Ship Constructive and Shipwrights' Association.

Moses was originally a Liberal but joined the Labour Party in 1918 and became a local leader. He contested the Plymouth Drake constituency in the elections of 1923 and 1924, before defeating Arthur Shirley Benn and H. Pratt in the 1929 election. He was the first royal dockyard worker to be elected to Parliament, serving till 1931. After being elected a petition was presented against him alleging bribery and corruption on the part of his agent during the election. He was cleared of all charges and awarded £3,000 costs.

Parliament of the United Kingdom
Preceded by Arthur Benn	Member of Parliament for Plymouth Drake; 1929–1931	Succeeded by Freddie Guest
