= Stephenson baronets =

Baronetcy in the Baronetage of the United Kingdom

The Stephenson Baronetcy, of Hassop Hall in the County of Derby, is a title in the Baronetage of the United Kingdom. It was created on 16 July 1936 for the businessman and politician Henry Kenyon Stephenson. The second baronet was also a businessman and a Lieutenant-Colonel in the Territorial Army. The third holder of the title did not prove his succession and was therefore not on the official roll of the baronetage, with the baronetcy considered dormant. For more information, follow this link. On 13 October 2026 the fourth baronet successfully proved his succession and appeared on the Official Roll of the Baronetage.

== Stephenson baronets, of Hassop Hall (1936) ==
- Sir Henry Kenyon Stephenson, 1st Baronet (1865–1947)
- Sir Henry Francis Blake Stephenson, 2nd Baronet (1895–1982)
- Henry Upton Stephenson, presumed 3rd Baronet (1926–2025)
- Sir Matthew Francis Timothy Stephenson, 4th Baronet (born 1960)

The heir apparent is the current holder's son, John Louis Stephenson (born 1986).

== Sources ==
- Kidd, Charles, Williamson, David (editors). Debrett's Peerage and Baronetage (1990 edition). New York: St Martin's Press, 1990.
- Leigh Rayment's list of baronets
