= Richard Storry Deans =

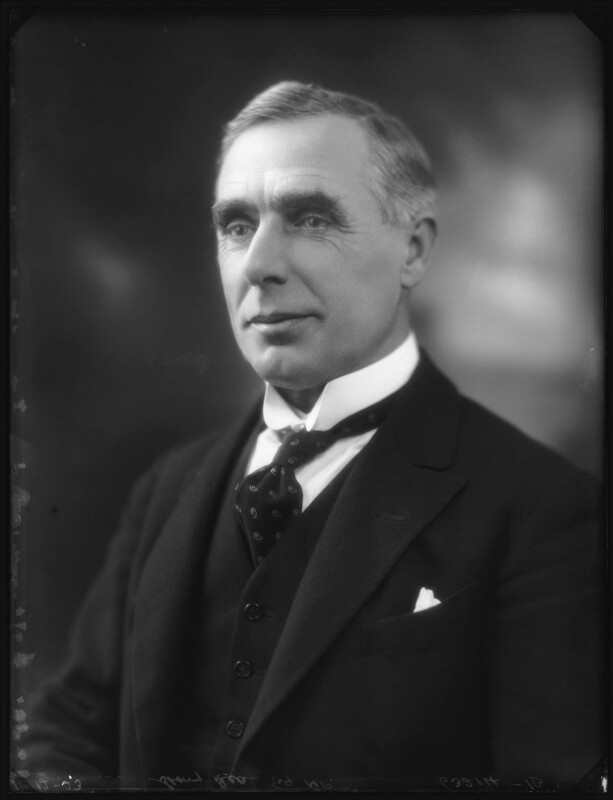
Storry Deans in 1923

Richard Storry Deans (1868 – 31 August 1938) was a British politician.

Storry Deans studied at the University of London and then at Gray's Inn. He joined the Conservative Party, and was narrowly elected when he stood as its candidate in Sheffield Park at the 1923 general election. He increased his majority in 1924, but lost the seat in 1929.

Parliament of the United Kingdom
Preceded by Henry Stephenson	Member of Parliament for Sheffield Park; 1923–1929	Succeeded by George Lathan
