= Sheffield Park (constituency) =

Parliamentary constituency in the United Kingdom, 1918–1983

- Former borough constituency for the House of Commons
- County: West Riding of Yorkshire, then South Yorkshire

1918–1983
- Created from: Sheffield Attercliffe, Sheffield Ecclesall and Sheffield Central
- Replaced by: Sheffield Heeley and Sheffield Central

Sheffield Park was a Parliamentary constituency in the City of Sheffield, England. The constituency was created in 1918 and abolished in 1983. The area formerly covered by this constituency is now mostly in the Sheffield Central constituency.

== Boundaries ==
1918–1950: The County Borough of Sheffield wards of Heeley and Park.

1950–1955: The County Borough of Sheffield wards of Manor, Moor, Park, and Sharrow.

1955–1974: The County Borough of Sheffield wards of Burngreave, Manor, Moor, and Park.

1974–1983: The County Borough of Sheffield wards of Burngreave, Castle, Manor, Park, and Sharrow.

== Members of Parliament ==
Election	Member	Party
1918	Henry Stephenson	Coalition Liberal
Jan 1922	Henry Stephenson	National Liberal
Nov 1923	Henry Stephenson	Liberal
Dec 1923	Richard Storry Deans	Conservative
1929	George Lathan	Labour
1931	Sir Arthur Benn, later Baron Glenravel	Conservative
1935	George Lathan	Labour
1942 by-election	Thomas Burden	Labour
1950	Fred Mulley	Labour
1983	constituency abolished: see Sheffield Central	

== Election results ==
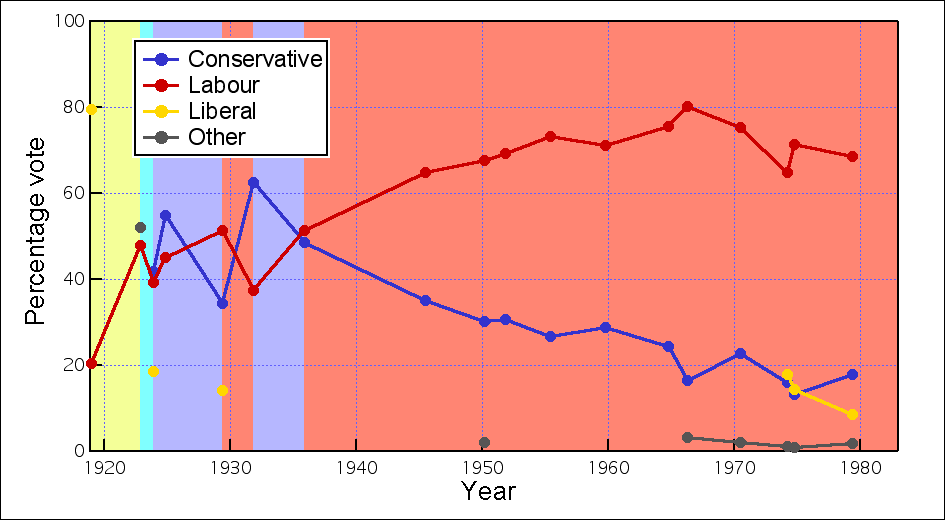
General election results 1918–1983

=== Elections in the 1970s ===
General election 1979: Sheffield Park
Party	Candidate	Votes	%	±%
Labour	Fred Mulley	27,483	68.6	−2.8
Conservative	Charles Cole	7,159	17.9	+4.7
Liberal	Francis Butler	4,737	8.5	−6.0
National Front	I. Pierson	302	0.8	New
Communist	Gordon Ashberry	279	0.7	−0.3
Workers Revolutionary	Paul Littlehales	111	0.3	New
Majority		20,324	50.7	−6.2
Turnout		40,062	64.5	+2.1
Labour hold		Swing		

General election October 1974: Sheffield Park
Party	Candidate	Votes	%	±%
Labour	Fred Mulley	30,057	71.4	+6.4
Liberal	Francis Butler	6,093	14.5	−3.4
Conservative	Robert Trench	5,539	13.2	−2.9
Communist	Gordon Ashberry	403	1.0	−0.1
Majority		23,964	56.9	+9.8
Turnout		42,092	62.4	−9.6
Labour hold		Swing		

General election February 1974: Sheffield Park
Party	Candidate	Votes	%	±%
Labour	Fred Mulley	31,273	65.0	−10.3
Liberal	Francis Butler	8,596	17.9	New
Conservative	Eric Crewe	7,731	16.1	−6.6
Communist	Cyril Morton	521	1.1	−1.0
Majority		22,677	47.1	−11.5
Turnout		48,121	71.8	+19.2
Labour hold		Swing		

General election 1970: Sheffield Park
Party	Candidate	Votes	%	±%
Labour	Fred Mulley	23,302	75.3	−5.0
Conservative	Tim Renton	7,024	22.7	+6.3
Communist	Cyril Morton	637	2.1	−1.2
Majority		16,278	58.6	−5.3
Turnout		30,963	52.6	−12.3
Labour hold		Swing		

=== Elections in the 1960s ===
General election 1966: Sheffield Park
Party	Candidate	Votes	%	±%
Labour	Fred Mulley	24,550	80.3	+4.7
Conservative	Robert Burns	5,017	16.4	−8.0
Communist	Cyril Morton	1,022	3.3	New
Majority		19,533	63.9	+12.7
Turnout		30,589	64.9	
Labour hold		Swing		

General election 1964: Sheffield Park
Party	Candidate	Votes	%	±%
Labour	Fred Mulley	24,196	75.6	+4.5
Conservative	Frank Adams	7,816	24.4	−4.5
Majority		16,380	51.2	+9.0
Turnout		32,012		
Labour hold		Swing		

=== Elections in the 1950s ===
General election 1959: Sheffield Park
Party	Candidate	Votes	%	±%
Labour	Fred Mulley	26,078	71.1	−2.1
National Liberal (Conservative)	John Neill	10,598	28.9	+2.1
Majority		15,480	42.2	−4.2
Turnout		36,676	71.2	−0.1
Labour hold		Swing		

General election 1955: Sheffield Park
Party	Candidate	Votes	%	±%
Labour	Fred Mulley	28,904	73.2	+4.0
National Liberal (Conservative)	Stanley Rippon	10,565	26.8	−4.0
Majority		18,339	46.4	+8.0
Turnout		39,469	71.3	−11.2
Labour hold		Swing		

General election 1951: Sheffield Park
Party	Candidate	Votes	%	±%
Labour	Fred Mulley	30,842	69.2	+1.5
National Liberal (Conservative)	Stanley Rippon	13,743	30.8	+0.5
Majority		17,099	38.4	+1.0
Turnout		44,585	82.5	−2.7
Labour hold		Swing		

General election 1950: Sheffield Park
Party	Candidate	Votes	%	±%
Labour	Fred Mulley	30,558	67.7	+2.8
National Liberal (Conservative)	Harold Pryce	13,678	30.3	−4.8
Communist	Arthur Fullard	909	2.0	New
Majority		16,880	37.4	+7.6
Turnout		45,145	85.2	+11.3
Labour hold		Swing		

=== Elections in the 1940s ===
General election 1945: Sheffield Park
Party	Candidate	Votes	%	±%
Labour	Thomas Burden	29,424	64.9	+13.4
Conservative	Geoffrey Stevens	15,882	35.1	–13.4
Majority		13,542	29.8	+26.8
Turnout		45,306	73.9	
Labour hold		Swing	+13.4	

In the 1942 by-election, Thomas Burden was elected unopposed.

=== Elections in the 1930s ===
General election 1935: Sheffield Park
Party	Candidate	Votes	%	±%
Labour	George Lathan	21,153	51.5	+14.1
Conservative	Arthur Benn	19,947	48.5	−14.1
Majority		1,206	3.0	N/A
Turnout		41,100		
Labour gain from Conservative		Swing	+14.1	

General election 1931: Sheffield Park
Party	Candidate	Votes	%	±%
Conservative	Arthur Benn	26,392	62.6	+28.1
Labour	George Lathan	15,783	37.4	−14.0
Majority		10,609	25.2	N/A
Turnout		42,175	81.1	+1.9
Conservative gain from Labour		Swing		

=== Elections in the 1920s ===
General election 1929: Sheffield Park
Party	Candidate	Votes	%	±%
Labour	George Lathan	20,304	51.4	+6.2
Unionist	Richard Deans	13,597	34.5	−10.7
Liberal	Ernest Edgar Dalton	5,560	14.1	New
Majority		6,707	16.9	N/A
Turnout		39,461	79.2	−1.9
Labour gain from Unionist		Swing	+8.4	

General election 1924: Sheffield Park
Party	Candidate	Votes	%	±%
Conservative	Richard Deans	14,053	54.8	+12.9
Labour	George Lathan	11,576	45.2	+5.8
Majority		2,477	9.6	+7.1
Turnout		25,629	81.1	+7.0
Conservative hold		Swing		

General election 1923: Sheffield Park
Party	Candidate	Votes	%	±%
Unionist	Richard Deans	9,648	41.9	New
Labour	George Lathan	9,050	39.4	−8.4
Liberal	Henry Stephenson	4,296	18.7	−33.5
Majority		598	2.5	N/A
Turnout		22,994	74.1	+1.1
Unionist gain from Liberal		Swing		

General election 1922: Sheffield Park
Party	Candidate	Votes	%	±%
National Liberal (Unionist)	Henry Stephenson	11,542	52.2	–27.4
Labour	Robert Morley	10,578	47.8	+27.4
Majority		964	4.4	−54.8
Turnout		22,120	73.0	+23.4
National Liberal hold		Swing	–27.4	

=== Elections in the 1910s ===
General election 1918: Sheffield Park
Party		Candidate	Votes	%
C	National Liberal	Henry Stephenson	12,339	79.6
	Labour	Alf Barton	3,167	20.4
Majority			9,172	59.2
Turnout			15,506	49.6
	National Liberal win (new seat)			
C indicates candidate endorsed by the coalition government.

== Sources ==
- Leigh Rayment's Historical List of MPs – Constituencies beginning with "P" (part 1)
- http://www.psr.keele.ac.uk/ (Election results from 1951 to the present)
- F. W. S. Craig, British Parliamentary Election Results 1918 - 1949
- F. W. S. Craig, British Parliamentary Election Results 1950 - 1970
- Sheffield General Election Results 1945 - 2001, Sheffield City Council
