= Glyn (name) =

Glyn [ˈɡlɪn] is a Welsh name meaning "valley."

Notable people with the name include:

== Surnames ==
- Alan Glyn (1918–1998), Conservative Party (UK) Member of Parliament
- Andrew Glyn (1943–2007), UK-based economist and lecturer at the University of Oxford
- Elinor Glyn (1864–1943), British novelist and scriptwriter
- Frederick Glyn, 4th Baron Wolverton (1864–1932), British banker and Conservative politician
- Gareth Glyn (born 1951), Welsh composer and radio broadcaster
- George Glyn, 1st Baron Wolverton (1797–1873), banker with interests in the railways
- George Grenfell Glyn, 2nd Baron Wolverton, PC (1824–1887), a British Liberal politician
- Guto'r Glyn (1435–1493), Welsh language poet
- Gwyneth Glyn (born 1979), Welsh language poet and musician
- Isabella Glyn (1823–1889), Victorian-era Shakespearean actress
- John Plumptre Carr Glyn (1837–1912), KCB, a British general
- Pascoe Glyn (1833–1904), British businessman and Liberal politician
- Ralph Glyn, 1st Baron Glyn (1884–1960), MC DL, a soldier and Conservative Party politician in the UK
- Richard Thomas Glyn (1831-1900), British Army general
- Sidney Glyn (1835–1916), British politician
- Sir Richard Glyn, 1st Baronet, of Ewell (1711–1773), British banker and politician
- Sir Richard Glyn, 1st Baronet, of Gaunt's House (1755–1838), British banker and politician
- Sir Richard Glyn, 9th Baronet OBE (1907–1980), TD, DL, a British army officer and Conservative politician
- William Glyn, American tennis player
- William Glyn (bishop) (or Glynn or Glynne, 1504–1558), Bishop of Bangor

== Given name ==
- Dafydd Glyn Jones (born 1941), Welsh scholar and lexicographer
- Edmund John Glyn Hooper (1818–1889), Canadian businessman and political figure
- Glyn Barker (born 1953), British businessman
- Glyn Barnett (born 1970), British international rifleman
- Glyn Berry (1946–2006), Canadian diplomat killed by a car bomb in Afghanistan
- Glyn Cannon (born 1976), British playwright
- Glyn Daniel (1914–1986), Welsh scientist who specialised in the European Neolithic
- Glyn Davidge (1933–2006), Welsh rugby player
- Glyn Davies (economist) (1919–2003), Welsh economist
- Glyn Davies (British politician) (born 1944), Welsh Conservative Party candidate for Montgomeryshire
- Glyn Davis (born 1959), Australian academic and vice-chancellor of the University of Melbourne
- Glyn Dearman (1939–1997), child actor
- Glyn Ford (born 1950), Labour member of the European Parliament
- Glyn Garner (born 1976), Welsh footballer
- Glyn Gilbert (1920–2003), highest-ranking Bermudian soldier
- Glyn Harman (born 1956), British mathematician working in analytic number theory
- Glyn Hodges (born 1963), Welsh football manager and player
- Glyn Houston (1925-2019), actor
- Glyn James (born 1941), Welsh footballer
- Glyn Johns (born 1942), musician, recording engineer and record producer
- Glyn Jones (South African writer) (1931–2014), South African actor, writer and director
- Glyn Jones (footballer, born 1959), Welsh footballer
- Glyn Jones (Welsh writer) (1905–1995), Welsh author
- Glyn Mason, 2nd Baron Blackford (1887–1972), UK Conservative Party politician
- Glyn Maxwell (born 1962), British poet
- Glyn Milburn (born 1971), American football player
- Glyn Moody, technology writer
- Glyn O'Malley (1951–2006), American playwright
- Glyn Owen (1928–2004), British actor
- Glyn Pardoe (born 1946), English footballer
- Glyn Philpot (1884–1937), English artist
- Glyn Prosser (1907–1972), Welsh rugby player
- Glyn Smallwood Jones (1908–1992), British colonial administrator in Southern Africa
- Glyn Stephens (1891–1965), Welsh rugby player
- Glyn Stone, British historian
- Glyn Thomas (1882–1967), musician
- Glyn Thompson (born 1981), English footballer
- Glyn Williams (footballer) (1918–2011), Welsh footballer
- Glyn Worsnip (1938–1996), British radio and television presenter
- Lewys Glyn Cothi (1420–1490), Welsh poet
- Martin Glyn Murray (born 1966), Welsh actor
- Rhodri Glyn Thomas AM (born 1953), Welsh politician
- Thomas Glyn Watkin (born 1952), first person to be appointed as First Welsh Legislative Counsel
- William Glyn Hughes Simon (1903–1972), Archbishop of Wales, 1968-71
