= East Dorset by-election =

East Dorset by-election may refer to:

- 1891 East Dorset by-election
- 1904 East Dorset by-election
- 1910 East Dorset by-election
- 1921 East Dorset by-election
