= George Glyn =

George Glyn may refer to:

== Barons ==
- George Glyn, 1st Baron Wolverton, British banker
- George Glyn, 2nd Baron Wolverton, British Liberal politician

== Baronets ==
- Sir George Glyn, 2nd Baronet (c. 1739–1814), of the Glyn baronets
- Sir George Lewen Glyn, 4th Baronet (1804–1885), of the Glyn baronets
- Sir George Turbervill Glyn, 5th Baronet (1841–1891), of the Glyn baronets

== See also ==
- Glyn (surname)
