= Baron Wolverton =

Barony in the Peerage of the United Kingdom

Barony of Wolverton
- Blazon: Arms: Argent an eagle displayed with two heads sable guttle d'or.; Crests: An eagle's head erased sable guttle d'or, in the beak an escallop argent.; Supporters: Two eagles, wings elevated sable guttee d'or
- Creation date: 14 December 1869
- Created by: Queen Victoria
- Peerage: Peerage of the United Kingdom
- First holder: George Carr Glyn, 1st Baron Wolverton
- Present holder: Miles John Glyn, 8th Baron Wolverton
- Heir presumptive: Jonathan Carlin Glyn
- Status: Extant
- Motto: FIDEI TENAX (Firm to my trust)

Baron Wolverton, of Wolverton in the County of Buckingham, is a title in the Peerage of the United Kingdom. It was created in 1869 for the banker George Glyn. He was the fourth son of Sir Richard Carr Glyn, 1st Baronet, of Gaunt's House, Lord Mayor of London in 1798, himself the fourth son of Sir Richard Glyn, 1st Baronet, of Ewell, Lord Mayor of London in 1758. Lord Wolverton was succeeded by the eldest of his nine sons, the second Baron. He was a Liberal politician and served under William Ewart Gladstone as Paymaster General and as Postmaster General. He was childless and was succeeded by his nephew, the third Baron. He was the eldest son of Vice-Admiral the Hon. Henry Carr Glyn, younger son of the first Baron. He died childless the following year aged only twenty-six, and was succeeded by his younger brother, the fourth Baron. He served as Vice-Chamberlain of the Household from 1902 to 1905 in the Conservative administration of Arthur Balfour. On the death in 1988 of his second but eldest surviving son, the fifth Baron, this line of the family failed. The title was inherited by the late Baron's second cousin, the sixth Baron. He was the grandson of the Hon. Pascoe Glyn, younger son of the first Baron. As of 2011 the title is held by his grandson, the eighth Baron, who succeeded in 2011.

Several other members of the Glyn family have also gained distinction. The Hon. Pascoe Glyn, younger son of the first Baron, sat as Member of Parliament for Dorset East. The Hon. Sidney Glyn, younger son of the first Baron, was Member of Parliament for Shaftesbury. The Right Reverend the Hon. Edward Glyn, younger son of the first Baron, was Bishop of Peterborough and the father of Ralph Glyn, 1st Baron Glyn. The Hon. Henry Carr Glyn, younger son of the first Baron, was a vice-admiral in the Royal Navy.

== Barons Wolverton (1869) ==
- George Carr Glyn, 1st Baron Wolverton (1797–1873)
  - George Grenfell Glyn, 2nd Baron Wolverton (1824–1887)
  - Vice-Admiral Hon. Henry Carr Glyn (1829–1884)
    - Henry Richard Glyn, 3rd Baron Wolverton (1861–1888)
    - Frederick Glyn, 4th Baron Wolverton (1864–1932)
      - Hon. George Edward Dudley Carr Glyn (1896–1930)
      - Nigel Reginald Victor Glyn, 5th Baron Wolverton (1904–1986)
  - Hon. Pascoe Charles Glyn (1833–1904)
    - Colonel Geoffrey Carr Glyn (1864–1933)
    - Maurice George Carr Glyn (1872–1920)
      - John Patrick Riversdale Glyn, 6th Baron Wolverton (1913–1988)
        - Christopher Richard Glyn, 7th Baron Wolverton (1938–2011)
        - Hon. Andrew John Glyn (1943–2007)
          - Miles John Glyn, 8th Baron Wolverton (born 1966)
          - (1) Jonathan Carlin Glyn (born 1990)
    - Hilary Beaujolais Glyn (1916–1995)
      - James Hilary Glyn (1939–2000)
        - (2) Caspar Hilary Gordon Glyn (born 1969)
          - (3) Oscar Robert Beaujolais Glyn (born 2001)
          - (4) Montfort James Jack Glyn (born 2003)
        - (5) Frederick Glyn (born 1987)

The heir presumptive is the present holder's half-brother Jonathan Carlin Glyn (born 1990).

== See also ==
- Glyn baronets of Ewell and Gaunt's House
- Baron Glyn
