= 1891 East Dorset by-election =

UK parliamentary by-election

The 1891 East Dorset by-election was held on 27 November 1891 after the death of the incumbent Conservative MP George Hawkesworth Bond. The seat was retained by the Conservative candidate Humphrey Napier Sturt.

East Dorset by-election, 1891
Party	Candidate	Votes	%	±%
Conservative	Humphrey Napier Sturt	4,421	52.0	−2.1
Liberal	Pascoe Glyn	4,074	48.0	+2.1
Majority		347	4.0	−4.2
Turnout		8,495	83.5	+1.7
Conservative hold		Swing	-2.1	
