= List of British divisions during the Crimean War =

On 28 March 1854, in support of the Ottoman Empire, the British and the Second French Empire declared war on the Russian Empire. Anglo-French forces landed at Gallipoli, to be in a position to defend Constantinople if needed. On 21 February 1854, FitzRoy Somerset, 1st Baron Raglan was appointed as the general officer commanding of the expeditionary force that was dubbed the Army of the East or the Eastern Army. In mid-June, the British force advanced to Varna, on the Black Sea coast of Ottoman Bulgaria. At Varna, they were reorganised into divisions.

British strategic policy was to destroy the Russian Black Sea Fleet, based at Sevastopol, in order to end the war and carry-out long-term British goals. On 14 September, the expeditionary landed north of Sevastopol and subsequently fought the Battle of Alma. This was followed by the investment the Russian port in October and the start of the Siege of Sevastopol. The expeditionary force fought the Battle of Inkerman soon after. While the battle ended in victory for the British force, it created the conditions that dragged the siege on through the winter into 1855. After the city had been subjected to several major cannonades, the Battle of the Great Redan was launched in 1855. This marked the final effort of the campaign. The expeditionary force remained in the Crimea until the war ended in 1856, after which the British Army demobilised.

== Divisions ==
Divisions
Formation name	Created	Ceased to exist	Locations served	Notes	Ref
1st Division	20 June 1854	1856	Ottoman Empire (East Thrace and Bulgaria), Russian Empire (Crimea)		
2nd Division	20 June 1854	1856	Ottoman Empire (East Thrace and Bulgaria), Russian Empire (Crimea)	The division played a prominent role in the Battle of Inkerman	
3rd Division	18 August 1854	1856	Ottoman Empire (East Thrace and Bulgaria), Russian Empire (Crimea)		
4th Division	18 August 1854	1856	Ottoman Empire (East Thrace and Bulgaria), Russian Empire (Crimea)	The division was not complete by the time it had landed in the Crimea, and received additional troops in September and its final units in November 1854. The division was heavily engaged in the Battle of Inkerman and went through four commanding officers during the fighting.	
Highland Division	13 August 1855	1856	Russian Empire (Crimea)	Formed in the Crimea following the reorganisation of the British force	
Light Division		1856	Ottoman Empire (East Thrace and Bulgaria), Russian Empire (Crimea)		
Cavalry Division	18 August 1854	1856	Ottoman Empire (East Thrace and Bulgaria), Russian Empire (Crimea)		
