= Lacy Walter Giles Yea =

Lacy Yea
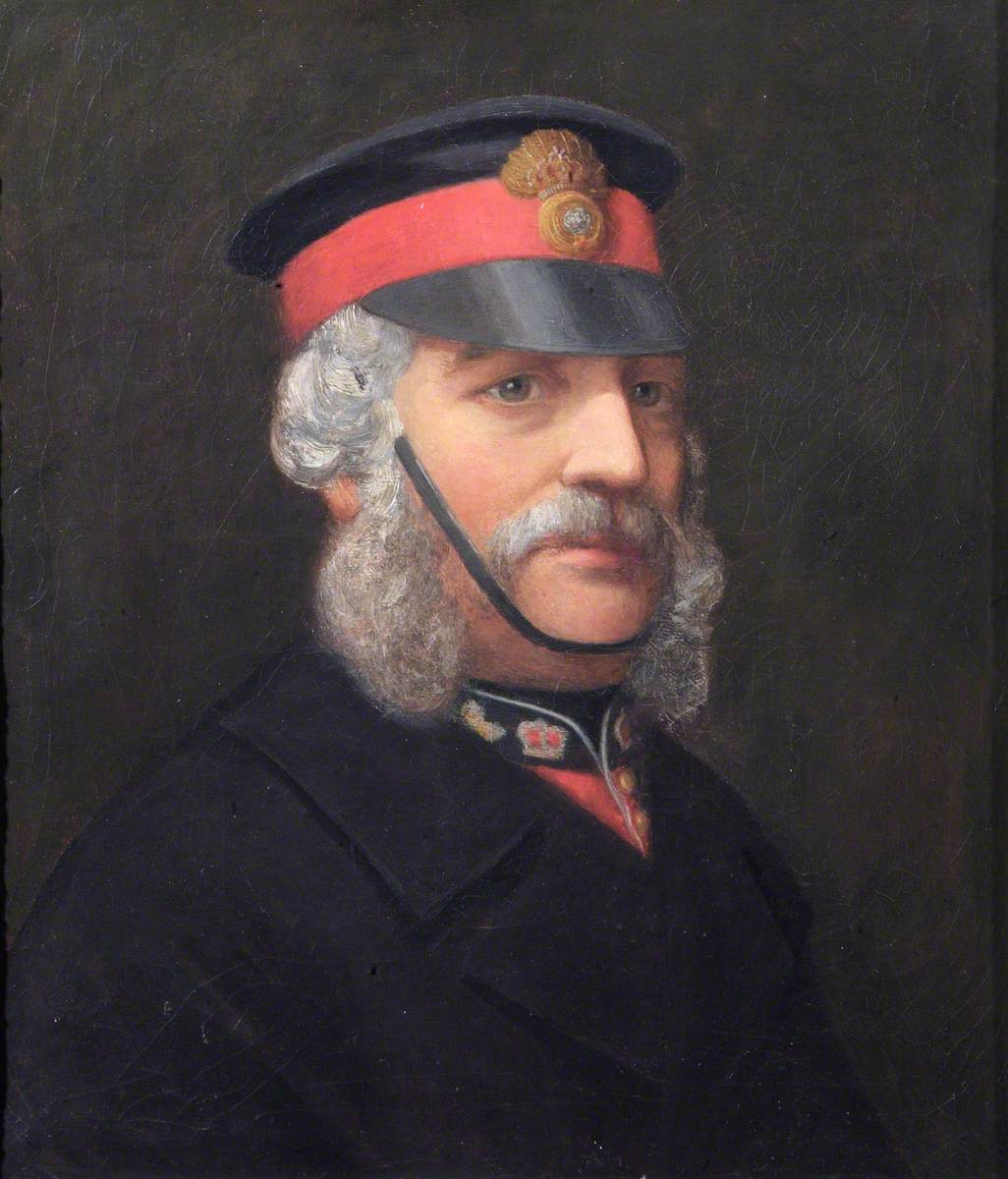
- Born: May 20, 1808; Bristol, United Kingdom
- Died: June 18, 1855 (aged 47); Sevastopol, Russian Empire
- Burial place: Sevastopol, Russian Empire
- Alma mater: Eton College
- Military career
- Allegiance: United Kingdom
- Branch: British Army
- Service years: 1825–1855
- Rank: Colonel
- Commands: 7th Regiment of Foot; 1st Brigade, Light Division
- Conflicts: Crimean War; Battle of Alma; Battle of Inkerman; Siege of Sevastopol †
- Memorials: Church of St. James, Taunton

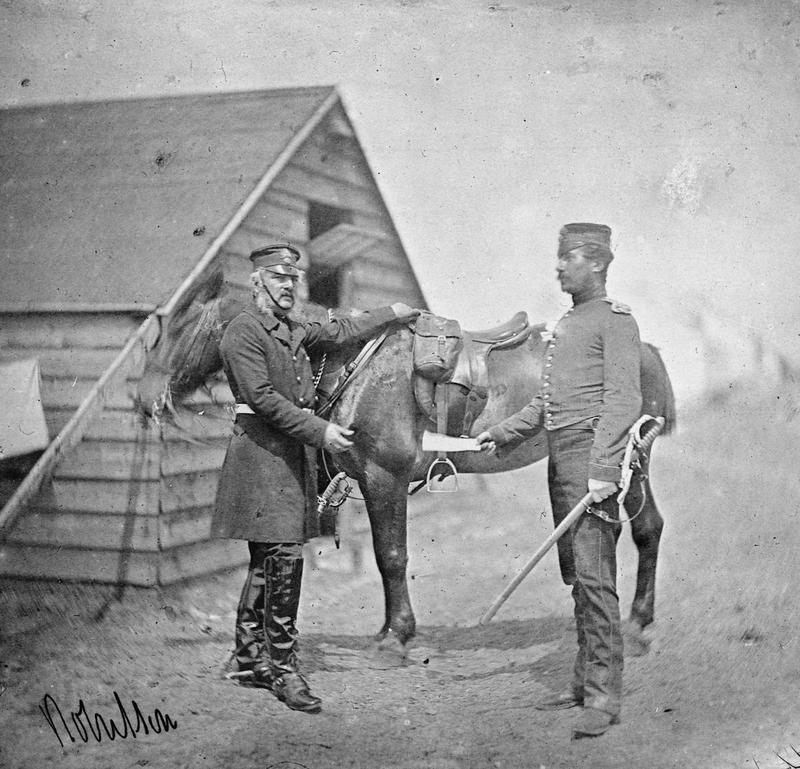
Colonel W.L.Yea with his horse, receives a signal from his adjutant, Lt.J.St Clair Hobson. Both were killed at Sevastopol

Lacy Walter Giles Yea (May 20, 1808 – June 18, 1855) was a British Army colonel, known for his role in the Crimean War, where he was killed in action.

== Early life ==
Born in Park Row, Bristol, on 20 May 1808, he was eldest son of Sir William Walter Yea, second baronet, of Pyrland, near Taunton, Somerset, who married, on 24 June 1805, Anne Heckstetter (d. 1846), youngest daughter of Colonel David Michel of Dulish House, Dorset.

Lacy Yea was educated at Eton College. He was commissioned as ensign in the 37th foot on 6 October 1825, obtained an unattached lieutenancy on 19 December 1826, was appointed to the 5th Foot on 13 March 1827, and exchanged to the 7th (Royal Fusiliers) on 13 March 1828. He served with it in the Mediterranean and America, becoming captain 30 December 1836, major on 3 June 1842, and lieutenant-colonel on 9 August 1850.

== Crimean War ==
In 1854 he went out in command of the Royal Fusiliers to Turkey and the Crimea, with a reputation as martinet. At the battle of Alma his regiment was on the right of the Light Division, and became engaged with the left wing of the Kazan Regiment, a deep column of fifteen hundred men. The Fusiliers held their own against this column when the rest of Sir William Codrington's brigade had fallen back, and at length forced it to give way. The regiment lost twelve officers and more than two hundred men. Yea received a letter of congratulation from Sir Edward Blakeney, who had led the regiment at Albuera, and was now its colonel.

At the battle of Inkerman the Fusiliers, as part of Codrington's brigade, were on the slope of Victoria ridge, acting on the right flank of the Russians, but not very heavily engaged. Yea was mentioned in despatches of 28 September and 11 November, and was made brevet-colonel on 28 November. During the hardships of the winter his care of his men was exemplary.

In the summer he had command of a brigade of the Light Division during the Battle of the Great Redan. In the assault of the Redan on 18 June 1855, he led the column directed against the left face. It consisted of a covering party of a hundred riflemen, a ladder party of about two hundred, a storming party of four hundred men of the 34th, and a reserve of eight hundred men of the 7th and 33rd. Leaving the latter under cover for the time, he went forward with the rest. They had a quarter of a mile of open ground to cross under grapeshot. Yea reached the abattis with the wreck of his parties, but there he was shot dead. His body was brought in next day, and he was buried on the 20th.

Yea was praised by Lord Raglan, in his despatch of 19 June; and by Sir William Codrington, then commanding the Light Division, to Yea's sisters. His eldest sister put up a marble monument to him in his parish church of Taunton St. James's, Somerset. A headstone marked his grave in the cemetery at Sevastopol.

Yea was unmarried. His father survived him, dying on 20 May 1862, when the baronetcy passed to Lacy's younger brother, Sir Henry Lacy Yea (d. 1864), third and last baronet.

The township of Yea, Victoria, Australia, was named in honour of Colonel Yea
