= Graham Hutton =

British economist, author and politician

David Graham Hutton OBE (13 April 1904 – 14 October 1988) was a British economist, writer and Liberal Party politician.

== Background ==
Hutton was born the elder son of David and Lavinia Hutton. He was educated at Christ's Hospital, the London School of Economics and at French and German Universities. He married Magdalene Ruth Rudolph, of Zürich. In 1934, the marriage was dissolved. In 1940, he married Joyce Muriel Green. They had three daughters. In 1958, the marriage was dissolved. He then married Marjorie Bremner, of Chicago. In 1945, he was awarded the OBE. In 1971, he was made an Honorary Fellow at the London School of Economics.

== Professional career ==
In 1929, Hutton became a Gladstone Memorial Prizeman at London University. He had a Research Fellowship and was on the teaching staff at the London School of Economics from 1929–33. In 1932, he became a Barrister-at-Law, at Gray’s Inn. From 1933 to 1938, he worked as assistant editor for The Economist. From 1939 to 1945, he worked at the Foreign Office and the Ministry of Information. He was associated with the Unservile State Group. In 1955, he helped to establish the Institute of Economic Affairs.

== Political career ==
Hutton was selected as Liberal candidate for the East Dorset for the General Election expected to occur in 1939/40. His prospects were good, particularly when the Labour candidate indicated he would withdraw and support Hutton as the Popular front candidate. However, due to the outbreak of war the election was deferred until 1945, when he did not stand. He did not subsequently stand for parliament.

== Publications ==
- Nations and the Economic Crisis, 1932
- The Burden of Plenty (as editor and contributor, 1935)
- Is it Peace?, 1936
- Danubian Destiny, 1939
- Midwest at Noon, 1946
- English Parish Churches, 1952
- We Too Can Prosper, 1953
- All Capitalists Now, 1960
- Inflation and Society, 1960
- Mexican Images, 1963
- Planning and Enterprise, 1964
- Politics and Economic Growth, 1968
- English Parish Churches, 1976 (with Olive Cook)
- Whatever Happened to Productivity? (Wincott Lecture), 1980
