= 1910 East Dorset by-election =

Parliamentary by-election held on 30 June 1910

← 1910	30 June 1910	1910 →

Candidate	Henry Guest	Nicholson
Party	Liberal	Conservative
Popular vote	6,967	6,375
Percentage	52.2%	47.8%
MP before election
Freddie Guest
Liberal
Subsequent MP
Freddie Guest
Liberal

The 1910 East Dorset by-election was a Parliamentary by-election held on 30 June 1910. The constituency returned one Member of Parliament (MP) to the House of Commons of the United Kingdom, elected by the first past the post voting system.

== Vacancy ==
Thirty-five-year-old Frederick Guest had been Liberal MP for the seat of East Dorset since the January 1910 general election. In May 1910, his own election result was declared void, and he was unseated because of election irregularities by his constituency agent. This meant a by-election would take place and without Guest as a candidate.

== Electoral history ==
The seat had been Liberal since they gained it in the 1904 East Dorset by-election. They narrowly held the seat at the last election, with a slightly increased majority;

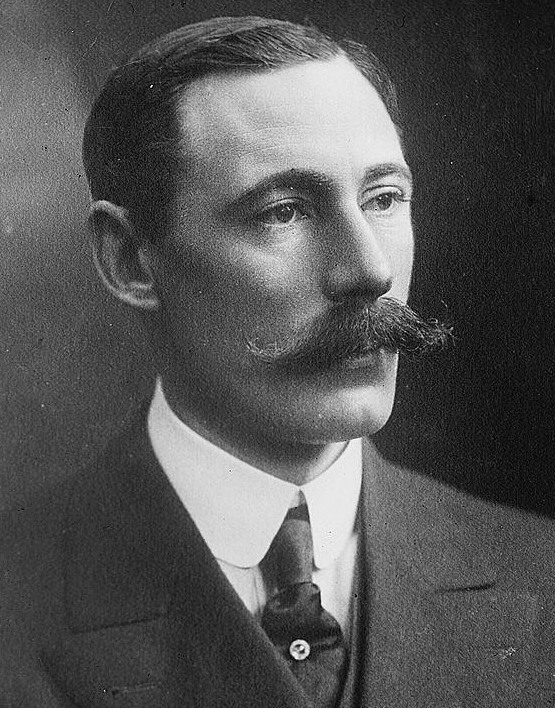
Freddie Guest

General election January 1910
Party	Candidate	Votes	%	±%
Liberal	Frederick Guest	6,957	51.6	+1.5
Conservative	John Sanctuary Nicholson	6,531	48.4	−1.5
Majority		426	3.2	+3.0
Turnout		13,488	91.2	+1.3
Liberal hold		Swing	+1.5	

== Candidates ==
The local Liberal Association selected 36-year-old Henry Guest, the older brother of Frederick Guest, to defend the seat. Like his brother, he had a military background, but unlike his brother, he had not before stood for parliament. The Conservatives retained John Sanctuary Nicholson as their candidate.

== Campaign ==
Polling Day was fixed for 30 June 1910.

== Result ==
In a remarkably high turnout, almost as high as the last General Election, the Liberals held the seat and managed a slightly increased majority;

Henry Guest

East Dorset by-election, 1910
Party	Candidate	Votes	%	±%
Liberal	Henry Guest	6,967	52.2	+0.6
Conservative	John Sanctuary Nicholson	6,375	47.8	−0.6
Majority		592	4.4	+1.2
Turnout		13,342	90.2	−1.0
Liberal hold		Swing	+0.6	

== Aftermath ==
Henry Guest did not defend the seat at the December 1910 general election and was instead elected for Pembroke and Haverfordwest. This allowed Frederick Guest to return first as Liberal candidate and then as the MP again;

General election December 1910
Party	Candidate	Votes	%	±%
Liberal	Frederick Guest	6,819	52.1	−0.1
Conservative	Maurice George Carr Glyn	6,266	47.9	+0.1
Majority		553	4.2	−0.2
Turnout		13,085	88.4	−1.8
Liberal hold		Swing		
