= Mervyn Wheatley =

British Army officer and Conservative politician

Member of Parliament for Poole East Dorset (1945–1950)
- In office 5 July 1945 – 25 October 1951
- Preceded by: Gordon Hall Caine
- Succeeded by: Richard Pilkington

Personal details
- Born: 24 April 1880
- Died: 26 October 1974 (aged 94)
- Party: Conservative

Colonel Sir Mervyn James Wheatley KBE (24 April 1880 – 26 October 1974) was a British Army officer and a Conservative Party politician.

Wheatley served in the Second Boer War in South Africa, where he took part in operations in Natal from March to June 1900, including action at Laing's Nek; then at Transvaal and in the Orange River Colony. He received a regular commission as a second lieutenant in the Dorsetshire Regiment on 27 July 1901. He stayed in South Africa throughout the war, which ended June 1902 with the Peace of Vereeniging. Four months later he left Cape Town with other officers and men of the 2nd battalion Dorset regiment on the SS German in late September 1902, and arrived at Southampton in late October, when they were posted to Portland.

He later gained the rank of colonel.

Wheatley was the member of parliament (MP) for East Dorset from 1945 to 1950 and for Poole from 1950 to 1951.

Wheatley was appointed an Officer of the Order of the British Empire (OBE) in 1919 for his war service, promoted to Commander of the Order (CBE) in the 1928 Birthday Honours when he was Governor of Bahr-el-Ghazal Province, Sudan, and further promoted to Knight Commander of the Order (KBE) in the 1952 New Year Honours for political and public services.

Parliament of the United Kingdom
Preceded by Gordon Ralph Hall Caine	Member of Parliament for East Dorset; 1945–1950	Constituency abolished
New constituency	Member of Parliament for Poole; 1950–1951	Succeeded by Richard Pilkington
