= Gordon Hall Caine =

British publisher and politician (1884–1962)

Gordon Hall Caine CBE
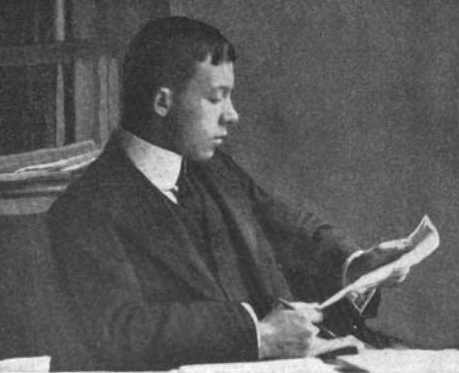
- In The Sketch, 11 December 1901
- Born: 15 August 1884; Hampstead, London, England
- Died: 5 March 1962 (aged 77); London, England
- Occupations: Publisher, businessman
- Political party: Conservative
- Parents: Hall Caine (father); Mary Chandler (mother)
- Relatives: Derwent Hall Caine (brother)

Gordon Ralph Hall Caine CBE (15 August 1884 – 5 March 1962) was a British publisher and Conservative politician who served as the Member of Parliament for Dorset East between 1922 and 1929, and again between 1931 and 1945.

== Biography ==
Caine was the son of British novelist Thomas Henry Hall Caine and his wife Mary Chandler. He was born at Hampstead London.

His father had dramatic interests in America and in 1902 Gordon Caine was in America to study business methods and consider publishing an American version of Household Words. With his brother, Derwent Hall Caine, he founded the publishing firm named The Readers Library Publishing Company Ltd. The firm was "arguably the first in Britain to specialise in novelizations of films". In 1920 as Deputy Controller of Paper, he was appointed a CBE.

At the 1922 general election Hall Caine was elected Member of Parliament (MP) for East Dorset as an Independent Conservative. He took the Conservative Whip in 1923 and held the seat until the 1929 general election, when he lost to Liberal candidate Alec Glassey. In the 1931 general election he regained the East Dorset seat, this time until 1945. His brother Derwent had won Everton in 1929 as a Labour candidate, but lost it in 1931.

Hall Caine had residences at Greeba Castle (previously owned by his father) and at Maidenhead, Wooley Firs. In the 1950s he moved with his second wife, Sarah Tripp, into a townhouse in Park Lane, which was round the corner from his office at Old Burlington Street.

He died at his home in London on 5 March 1962.

== Hall Caine Airport ==
In 1935 Gordon Hall Caine and Derwent Hall Caine established the Hall Caine Airport on the Isle of Man. Both Sir Thomas Henry Hall Caine's sons were particularly keen on the development of an aerodrome in the north of the Isle of Man, as they saw it as another bit of the island as being associated with their late father. They were said to be extremely interested in the progress of the Isle of Man and in particular its transport infrastructure. They also wished to include Ramsey's municipal authority in the project, as they were both of the opinion that the aerodrome would bring immense benefit to the town.

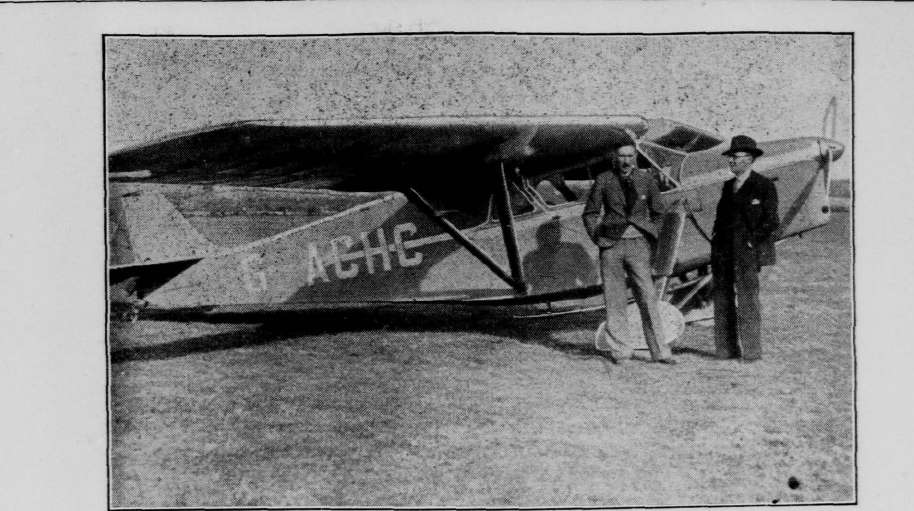
Derwent Hall Caine pictured with his Leopard Moth at Close Lake Airfield, April 1935.

Amongst the ambitious plans envisaged by Derwent Hall Caine was the inclusion of the airfield as part of an air network running the length of the country from Jersey and staging through numerous destinations including Close Lake, terminating at Campbeltown. In an interview with the Ramsey Courier Derwent Hall Caine stated that from the introduction of air services, the site was to be known as Hall Caine Manx Airport. This was subsequently changed to the Hall Caine Airport, Ramsey. With all parties duly satisfied, Hall Caine Airport officially came into being on 30 April 1935.

Hall Caine Airport flourished from 1935 until it ceased commercial operations in 1937.

Parliament of the United Kingdom
Preceded by Freddie Guest	Member of Parliament for East Dorset; 1922 – 1929	Succeeded by Alec Glassey
Preceded by Alec Glassey	Member of Parliament for East Dorset; 1931 – 1945	Succeeded by Mervyn Wheatley
