= Alec Glassey =

British Liberal politician

Alec Ewart Glassey

Member of Parliament for East Dorset
- In office 1929–1931
- Preceded by: Gordon Ralph Hall Caine
- Succeeded by: Gordon Ralph Hall Caine

Personal details
- Born: 29 December 1887 Normanton, Yorkshire
- Died: 26 June 1970 (aged 82)
- Party: Liberal
- Spouse: Mary Longbottom
- Children: Margaret, Gwen and Marianne.
- Profession: Member of Parliament, Justice of the Peace, Chairman of the Congregational Union

Alec Ewart Glassey (29 December 1887 – 26 June 1970) was a British Liberal politician. He was Member of Parliament for East Dorset from 1929 to 1931.

== Early life ==
Glassey was born at Normanton, Yorkshire, the son of the Reverend William Glassey, a Congregational Minister. He was educated at Penistone Grammar School. In 1910 he married Mary Longbottom. They had three daughters, Margaret, Gwen and Marianne. He served in the British Army throughout the First World War as a subaltern in the Highland Light Infantry and was mentioned in despatches.

== Liberal Member of Parliament ==
Glassey contested East Dorset at the 1924 general election coming second behind the Conservative. The Liberals were not well organised nationally in 1924 and no longer had the uniting issue of Free Trade to provide an anti-Conservative focus as they had in 1923. Garry Tregidga comments that "...except for individuals like Lloyd George [the Liberals] fail[ed] to provide an inspiring programme for office..." However he also identifies Glassey as a local exception to this poor showing, who against the regional and national trends raised the party's share of the vote in a three-cornered contest. In contrast to many Liberal candidates, Glassey fought a vigorous and positive campaign. His election addresses concentrated on social issues and drew on Lloyd George's plans to develop the coal and power industries. This foreshadowed the policy issues the Liberal Party would put forward in the 1929 general election when Glassey fought the seat again, this time beating the sitting Tory MP, Gordon Ralph Hall Caine, albeit by the narrow majority of 277. One of the political issues which Glassey supported was the unification of the three service ministries, the War Office, the Admiralty and the Air Ministry into a single Ministry of Defence, although this did not come about until as late as 1964. Glassey saw unification as a positive step on the road to disarmament and to promote economy. In 1931 Glassey became a minister in the National Government, a Lord Commissioner of the Treasury in effect a government whip.

== Liberal National ==
In the Liberal split of September 1931, when Sir John Simon formed the Liberal National group in Parliament to continue giving support to the National Government, Glassey decided at a late stage to come down on the Liberal National side, a fact that was surprising in the light of his earlier loyalty to the leadership of Sir Herbert Samuel – indeed one historian describes Glassey as a Samuelite even at the time of the general election and in the face of his description of himself as "THE National Government candidate". In fact Glassey proposed to stand as a candidate without reference to any party in 1931 and he received a message of support from Prime Minister Ramsay MacDonald before the election. Glassey said he stood as a National Government candidate endorsing every word in the Prime Minister's manifesto. The likely explanation for his choosing in the end actually to join the Liberal Nationals is that he realised his majority was vulnerable to the Conservative revival and was hoping the Unionists would stand aside for him as a supporter of the National Government. His wife spoke at election meetings on behalf of Samuelite candidates in other West Country constituencies and once the election was over, Glassey himself returned to the Liberals, becoming Chairman of the Western Counties Federation. In fact the decision of the Conservatives to oppose Glassey caused some dissension in local Tory ranks as the Conservative Party at national level had agreed to support National Government candidates but not enough to prevent the former MP Hall Caine standing against him. Against the trend for National successes in 1931 across the country and the West Country, Glassey lost his seat back to Hall Caine.

== Outside Parliament ==
Outside Parliament Glassey was an important figure in the Congregational Church. He was Chairman of the Congregational Union of England and Wales from 1941 to 1942, Co-Treasurer from 1953 to 1957 and a Member of the Church Council. He was a member of the Commonwealth Missionary Society from 1945 to 1947. From 1961 to 1962 he was Director of Congregational Insurance Co. Ltd and as part of his work for the Church he oversaw the collection of over £500,000 for re-building bombed churches. He also served as a Justice of the Peace in Poole, Dorset.

He was also the uncle of author David Cornwell, whose pen name was John le Carré.

Parliament of the United Kingdom
| Preceded by G. R. Hall Caine | Member of Parliament for East Dorset; 1929–1931 | Succeeded by G. R. Hall Caine |
