= Frederick Glyn, 4th Baron Wolverton =

British banker and Conservative politician

The Lord Wolverton
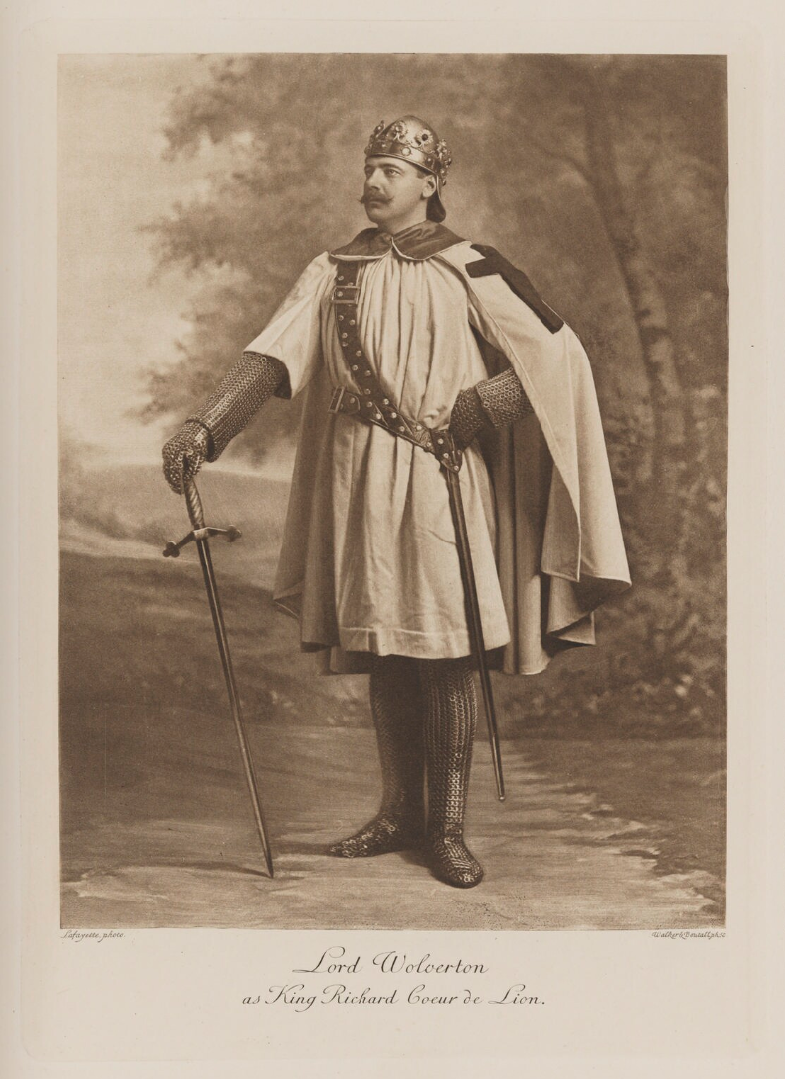
- Posing as Richard the Lionheart, 1897

Vice-Chamberlain of the Household
- In office 17 November 1902 – 4 December 1905
- Monarch: Edward VII
- Preceded by: Sir Alexander Acland-Hood, Bt
- Succeeded by: Wentworth Beaumont

Personal details
- Born: 24 September 1864
- Died: 3 October 1932 (aged 68)
- Party: Conservative
- Spouse(s): Lady Edith Ward (1872–1956)

Frederick Glyn, 4th Baron Wolverton (24 September 1864 – 3 October 1932), was a British banker and Conservative politician. He served as Vice-Chamberlain of the Household under Arthur Balfour from 1902 to 1905.

== Background ==
Glyn was the younger son of Vice-Admiral the Honourable Henry Carr Glyn, younger son of George Glyn, 1st Baron Wolverton. His mother was Rose Mahoney, daughter of Reverend Denis Mahoney, of Dromore Castle, County Kerry. He was a partner in the family banking firm of Glyn, Mills & Co.

== Political career ==
In 1888 Glyn succeeded in the barony on the early death of his elder brother Henry Glyn and took his seat on the Conservative benches in the House of Lords. He served in the Conservative administration of Arthur Balfour as Vice-Chamberlain of the Household from late November 1902 to December 1905.

In late 1902 Lord and Lady Wolverton visited British India to attend the 1903 Delhi Durbar.

== Military career ==
Lord Wolverton was commissioned a second lieutenant in the North Somerset Yeomanry on 29 January 1900. After the outbreak of the Second Boer War, Lord Wolverton volunteered for active service and joined the Imperial Yeomanry. He left Southampton on board the SS Scot in late January 1900, and arrived in South Africa the following month. He served in the Orange Free State, where in March 1900 he is reported to be attached to the force which occupied Rouxville.

He was appointed Honorary Colonel of the 2nd (South Middlesex) Volunteer Rifle Corps on 29 August 1903, and when the unit was merged into the 13th (Kensington) Battalion, London Regiment, in the new Territorial Force in 1908, Wolverton helped to set up a new 10th Battalion, Middlesex Regiment, and became Hon Colonel of that unit.

== Family ==
Lord Wolverton married Lady Edith Amelia, daughter of William Ward, 1st Earl of Dudley, in 1895. They had four children:

- Hon. George Edward Dudley Carr Glyn (1896–1930), died unmarried.
- Hon. Marion Feodorovna Louise Glyn DCVO (1900–1970), married George Villiers, Lord Hyde, and mother of Laurence Villiers, 7th Earl of Clarendon.
- Nigel Reginald Victor Glyn, 5th Baron Wolverton (1904–1986), died unmarried.
- Hon. Esmé Consuelo Helen Glyn (1908–1991), married Lord Rhyl.

Lord Wolverton died in October 1932, aged 68, and was succeeded in the barony by his second but eldest surviving son, Nigel. Lady Wolverton died in 1956, aged 83.

== Arms ==
Coat of arms of Frederick Glyn, 4th Baron Wolverton
Coronet A coronet of an Baron Crest An eagle's head erased sable guttle d'or, in the beak an escallop argent. Escutcheon Argent an eagle displayed with two heads sable guttle d'or. Supporters Two eagles, wings elevated sable guttee d'or. Motto Fidei Tenax (Firm to my trust)

Political offices
Preceded by Sir Alexander Acland-Hood, Bt	Vice-Chamberlain of the Household; 1902–1905	Succeeded by Wentworth Beaumont
Peerage of the United Kingdom
Preceded by Henry Richard Glyn	Baron Wolverton; 1888–1932	Succeeded by Nigel Reginald Victor Glyn
