= Glyn baronets of Gaunt's House (1800) =

Escutcheon of the Glyn baronets of Gaunt's House

The Glyn baronetcy, of Gaunt's House in the County of Dorset, was created in the Baronetage of Great Britain on 22 November 1800 for Richard Carr Glyn. He was the fourth son of the 1st Baronet of the 1759 creation.

Glyn was senior partner from 1789 of the family bank Glyn, Mills & Co.. He sat as Member of Parliament for St. Ives from 1796 to 1802. In 1798 he served as Lord Mayor of London. Gaunt's House near Hinton Martell was built for him in 1809.

The 4th Baronet succeeded to the Glyn baronetcy of Ewell in 1942, and the titles have remained united.

== Glyn baronets, of Gaunt's House (1800) ==
- Sir Richard Carr Glyn, 1st Baronet (1755–1838)
- Sir Richard Plumptre Glyn, 2nd Baronet (1787–1863)
- Sir Richard George Glyn, 3rd Baronet (1831–1918)
- Sir Richard Fitzgerald Glyn, 4th Baronet (1875–1960) (succeeded as 8th Baronet of Ewell in 1942)

See Glyn baronets of Ewell (1759) for the further succession.

== Extended family ==
George Glyn, 1st Baron Wolverton was the fourth son of the 1st Baronet.

== Notes ==
Baronetage of Great Britain
Preceded by Troubridge baronets	Glyn baronets of Gaunt's House; 22 November 1800	Succeeded by Kingsmill baronets
