= East Dorset (constituency) =

Former parliamentary constituency in the United Kingdom

- Former county constituency for the House of Commons

1885–1950
- Seats: One
- Created from: Dorset, Wareham and Poole
- Replaced by: Poole and North Dorset

East Dorset is a former United Kingdom Parliamentary constituency. It was formally known as the Eastern Division of Dorset. It was a constituency of the House of Commons of the Parliament of the United Kingdom. It was represented by one Knight of the Shire.

== History ==
Before 1885 the historic county of Dorset, in south-west England, was an undivided three-seat county constituency - see the article on the Dorset constituency. In 1885 the county was divided for Parliamentary purposes into four single-member county constituencies: this constituency, North Dorset, South Dorset and West Dorset (no borough constituencies were created in Dorset in the 1885 redistribution). Each of these divisions comprised roughly a quarter of the area of the county and returned one Member of Parliament.

In the 1918 redistribution, the four Dorset constituencies were retained, but their boundaries were redrawn. East Dorset was reduced in area to about half its former size, with the northern part of the pre-1918 seat being transferred to North Dorset and the southern part to South Dorset.

In the 1950 redistribution, this constituency disappeared. A new borough constituency of Poole was created. Wimborne Minster Urban District and the part of Wimborne and Cranborne Rural District previously in the abolished seat were transferred to the redrawn North Dorset.

== Boundaries ==
1885–1918: The Municipal Borough of Poole, the Sessional Division of Wimborne, and part of the Sessional Division of Wareham.

1918–1950: The Municipal Borough of Poole, the Urban District of Wimborne Minster, the Rural District of Poole, and part of the Rural District of Wimborne and Cranborne.

== Members of Parliament ==
Election	Member	Party	Notes
1885	Pascoe Glyn	Liberal	Younger son of Lord Wolverton
1886	George Hawkesworth Bond	Conservative	Died in 1891
1891 by-election	Hon. Humphrey Sturt	Conservative	Succeeded as 2nd Baron Alington in 1904
1900	Hon. Humphrey Sturt	Conservative	Succeeded as 2nd Baron Alington in 1904
1904 by-election	Charles Henry Lyell	Liberal	MP for Edinburgh South from April 1910
January 1910	Hon. Frederick Guest	Liberal	Unseated on petition in May 1910
June 1910 by-election	Henry Guest	Liberal	MP for Pembroke & Haverfordwest from Dec 1910
December 1910	Frederick Guest	Liberal	
1916	Frederick Guest	Coalition Liberal	Coalition Liberal Chief Whip 1917–1921
1922	Frederick Guest	National Liberal	Secretary of State for Air 1921–1922
1922	Gordon Hall Caine	Independent Conservative	Took Conservative Whip January 1923
1923	Gordon Hall Caine	Conservative	Took Conservative Whip January 1923
1929	Alec Glassey	Liberal	
1931	Alec Glassey	Liberal National	
1931	Gordon Hall Caine	Conservative	
1945	Mervyn Wheatley	Conservative	
1950	constituency abolished		

== Elections ==
=== Elections in the 1880s ===
General election 1885: East Dorset
Party	Candidate	Votes	%
Liberal	Pascoe Glyn	4,543	54.2
Conservative	George Hawkesworth Bond	3,846	45.8
Majority		697	8.4
Turnout		8,389	86.0
Registered electors		9,758	
Liberal win (new seat)			

General election 1886: East Dorset
Party	Candidate	Votes	%	±%
Conservative	George Hawkesworth Bond	4,317	54.1	+8.3
Liberal	Pascoe Glyn	3,662	45.9	−8.3
Majority		655	8.2	N/A
Turnout		7,979	81.8	−4.2
Registered electors		9,758		
Conservative gain from Liberal		Swing	+8.3	

=== Elections in the 1890s ===
Bond's death caused a by-election.

By-election, 27 Nov 1891: East Dorset
Party	Candidate	Votes	%	±%
Conservative	Humphrey Sturt	4,421	52.0	−2.1
Liberal	Pascoe Glyn	4,074	48.0	+2.1
Majority		347	4.0	−4.2
Turnout		8,495	83.5	+1.7
Registered electors		10,175		
Conservative hold		Swing	−2.1	

General election 1892: East Dorset
Party	Candidate	Votes	%	±%
Conservative	Humphrey Sturt	Unopposed		
Conservative hold				

General election 1895: East Dorset
Party	Candidate	Votes	%	±%
Conservative	Humphrey Sturt	Unopposed		
Conservative hold				

=== Elections in the 1900s ===
A.A. Allen

General election January 1900: East Dorset
Party	Candidate	Votes	%	±%
Conservative	Humphrey Sturt	4,776	50.5	N/A
Liberal	Arthur Acland Allen	4,680	49.5	New
Majority		96	1.0	N/A
Turnout		9,456	81.4	N/A
Registered electors		11,616		
Conservative hold		Swing	N/A	

Charles Lyell

1904 East Dorset by-election
Party	Candidate	Votes	%	±%
Liberal	Charles Lyell	5,929	53.7	+4.2
Conservative	Charles Van Raalte	5,109	46.3	−4.2
Majority		820	7.4	N/A
Turnout		11,038	87.0	+5.6
Registered electors		12,686		
Liberal gain from Conservative		Swing	+4.2	

General election January 1906: East Dorset
Party	Candidate	Votes	%	±%
Liberal	Charles Lyell	6,104	50.1	+0.6
Conservative	Charles Van Raalte	6,083	49.9	−0.6
Majority		21	0.2	N/A
Turnout		12,187	89.9	+8.5
Registered electors		13,557		
Liberal gain from Conservative		Swing		

=== Elections in the 1910s ===
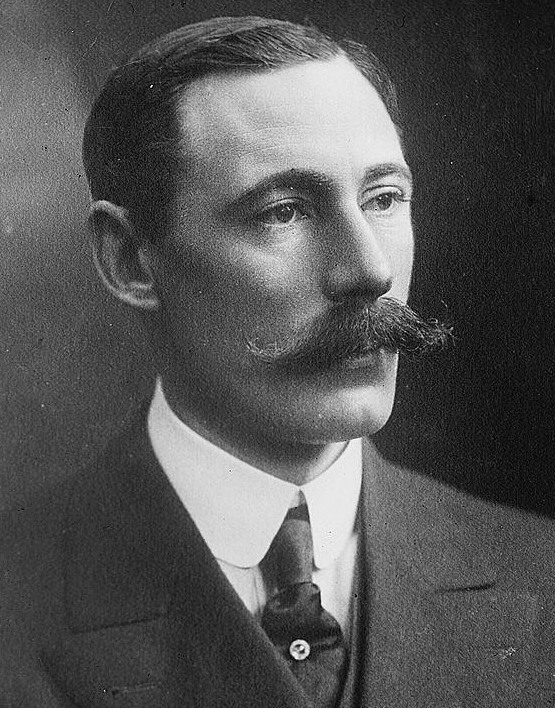
Frederick Guest

General election January 1910: East Dorset
Party	Candidate	Votes	%	±%
Liberal	Frederick Guest	6,957	51.6	+1.5
Conservative	John Nicholson	6,531	48.4	−1.5
Majority		426	3.2	+3.0
Turnout		13,488	91.2	+1.3
Liberal hold		Swing	+1.5	

Henry Guest

1910 East Dorset by-election
Party	Candidate	Votes	%	±%
Liberal	Henry Guest	6,967	52.2	+0.6
Conservative	John Nicholson	6,375	47.8	−0.6
Majority		592	4.4	+1.2
Turnout		13,342	90.2	−1.0
Liberal hold		Swing	+0.6	

General election December 1910: East Dorset
Party	Candidate	Votes	%	±%
Liberal	Frederick Guest	6,811	52.1	+0.5
Conservative	Maurice George Carr Glyn	6,266	47.9	−0.5
Majority		545	4.2	+1.0
Turnout		13,077	88.4	−1.8
Liberal hold		Swing		

By-election 1911, East Dorset
Party	Candidate	Votes	%	±%
Liberal	Frederick Guest	Unopposed		
Liberal hold				

General Election 1914–15

Another General Election was required to take place before the end of 1915. The political parties had been making preparations for an election to take place from 1914 and by the end of this year, the following candidates had been selected;

- Liberal: Frederick Guest
- Unionist:

General election 1918: East Dorset
Party		Candidate	Votes	%	±%
C	National Liberal	Frederick Guest	11,944	73.4	+21.3
	Labour	Alfred Smith	4,321	26.6	New
Majority			7,623	46.8	+42.6
Turnout			16,265	54.2	−34.2
Registered electors			29,988		
	National Liberal hold		Swing		
C indicates candidate endorsed by the coalition government.

=== Elections in the 1920s ===
By-election 1921, East Dorset
Party	Candidate	Votes	%	±%
National Liberal	Frederick Guest	Unopposed		
National Liberal hold				

General election 1922: East Dorset
Party	Candidate	Votes	%	±%
Ind. Unionist	Gordon Hall Caine	12,513	49.1	New
Labour	Frederick Jesse Hopkins	6,914	27.1	+0.5
National Liberal	Frederick Guest	6,062	23.8	−49.6
Majority		5,599	22.0	N/A
Turnout		25,489	80.2	+26.0
Registered electors		31,797		
Ind. Unionist gain from National Liberal		Swing		

General election 1923: East Dorset
Party	Candidate	Votes	%	±%
Unionist	Gordon Hall Caine	12,480	48.5	−0.6
Liberal	Richard Evan Williams Kirby	7,535	29.2	+5.4
Labour	Frederick Jesse Hopkins	5,760	22.3	−4.8
Majority		4,945	19.3	−−2.7
Turnout		25,775	78.5	−1.7
Registered electors		32,828		
Unionist hold		Swing	−3.0	

General election 1924: East Dorset
Party	Candidate	Votes	%	±%
Unionist	Gordon Hall Caine	14,479	52.6	+4.1
Liberal	Alec Glassey	8,828	32.1	+2.9
Labour	Edward Joseph Stocker	4,205	15.3	−7.0
Majority		5,651	20.5	+1.2
Turnout		27,512	80.3	+1.8
Registered electors		34,249		
Unionist hold		Swing	+0.6	

General election 1929: East Dorset
Party	Candidate	Votes	%	±%
Liberal	Alec Glassey	17,810	42.2	+10.1
Unionist	Gordon Hall Caine	17,533	41.6	−11.0
Labour	Edward Joseph Stocker	6,819	16.2	+0.9
Majority		277	0.6	N/A
Turnout		42,162	81.5	+1.2
Registered electors		51,756		
Liberal gain from Unionist		Swing	+10.6	

=== Elections in the 1930s ===
General election 1931: East Dorset
Party	Candidate	Votes	%	±%
Conservative	Gordon Hall Caine	20,711	44.5	+2.9
National Liberal	Alec Glassey	18,801	40.4	−1.8
Labour	Edward Joseph Stocker	7,009	15.1	−1.1
Majority		1,910	4.1	N/A
Turnout		46,521	82.6	+1.1
Conservative gain from National Liberal		Swing		

General election 1935: East Dorset
Party	Candidate	Votes	%	±%
Conservative	Gordon Hall Caine	25,520	53.5	+9.0
Liberal	Frank Raffety	11,349	23.8	N/A
Labour	Edward Joseph Stocker	10,822	22.7	+7.6
Majority		14,171	29.7	+25.6
Turnout		47,691	74.4	−8.2
Conservative hold		Swing		

=== Elections in the 1940s ===
General Election 1939–40

Another General Election was required to take place before the end of 1940. The political parties had been making preparations for an election to take place from 1939 and by the end of this year, the following candidates had been selected;

- Conservative: Mervyn Wheatley
- Liberal: David Hutton
- Labour: Hugh Ross Williamson

General election 1945: East Dorset
Party	Candidate	Votes	%	±%
Conservative	Mervyn Wheatley	26,561	43.8	−9.7
Labour	Charles Fletcher-Cooke	25,093	41.4	+18.7
Liberal	John Arthur Hugh Mander	8,975	14.8	−9.0
Majority		1,468	2.4	−27.3
Turnout		60,629	75.0	+0.6
Conservative hold		Swing		

== See also ==
- List of former United Kingdom Parliament constituencies
