= Yea baronets =

Title

Escutcheon of the Yea baronets

The Yea baronetcy, of Pyrland in the County of Somerset, was a title in the Baronetage of Great Britain. It was created on 18 June 1759 for William Yea, who was High Sheriff of Somerset in 1760. The title became extinct on the death of the third Baronet in 1864.

== Yea baronets, of Pyrland (1759) ==
- Sir William Yea, 1st Baronet (died 1806)
- Sir William Walter Yea, 2nd Baronet (1784–1862)
- Sir Henry Lacy Yea, 3rd Baronet (1798–1864)

== See also ==
- Colonel Lacy Walter Giles Yea, oldest son of Sir William Walter Yea, 2nd Baronet

Baronetage of Great Britain
Preceded by Gideon baronets	Yea baronets of Pyrland; 18 June 1759	Succeeded by Glyn baronets
