= Pascoe Glyn =

British businessman & politician (1833-1904)

The Hon. Pascoe Charles Glyn (12 April 1833 – 3 November 1904), was a British businessman and Liberal politician.

Glyn was a younger son of George Glyn, 1st Baron Wolverton, and his wife Marianne, daughter of Pascoe Grenfell. George Glyn, 2nd Baron Wolverton. Vice-Admiral the Hon. Henry Carr Glyn, Sidney Glyn and the Right Reverend the Hon. Edward Glyn, Bishop of Peterborough, were his brothers. He was returned to Parliament for Dorset East in December 1885, but only held the seat until July the following year.

Glyn married firstly Horatia Louisa, daughter of the Venerable Carew Anthony St John-Mildmay, in October 1858. She died only a month later. He married secondly Caroline Henrietta, daughter of Captain Willian Amhurst Hale, in 1861. Glyn died in November 1904, aged 71. His wife died in August 1912. Their son Maurice George Carr Glyn was the father of John Glyn, 6th Baron Wolverton.

== See also ==
- Baron Wolverton
- Glyn baronets

== Notes ==
Parliament of the United Kingdom
New constituency	Member of Parliament for Dorset East; 1885–1886	Succeeded by George Hawkesworth Bond
