= 1904 East Dorset by-election =

UK parliamentary by-election

- 16 March 1904

Candidate	Lyell	Van Raalte
Party	Liberal	Conservative
Popular vote	6,104	6,083
Percentage	50.1%	49.9%
MP before election
Humphrey Sturt
Conservative
Subsequent MP
Charles Henry Lyell
Liberal

The 1904 East Dorset by-election was a Parliamentary by-election held on 16 March 1904. The constituency returned one Member of Parliament (MP) to the House of Commons of the United Kingdom, elected by the first past the post voting system.

== Vacancy ==
Hon. Humphrey Sturt had been Conservative MP for the seat of East Dorset since the 1891 By-Election. His succession to the peerage as Baron Alington came on 17 February 1904.

== Electoral history ==
The seat had been Conservative since they gained it in 1886. They held the seat at the last election:

General election January 1900
Party	Candidate	Votes	%	±%
Conservative	Humphrey Sturt	4,776	50.5	N/A
Liberal	Arthur Acland Allen	4,680	49.5	New
Majority		96	1.0	N/A
Turnout		9,456	81.4	N/A
Conservative hold		Swing	N/A	

== Candidates ==
The local Conservative Association selected 47-year-old Charles Van Raalte as their candidate to defend the seat. He was Mayor of Poole in 1903. Van Raalte was of Dutch descent and lived locally on Brownsea Island.

The local Liberal Association selected 29-year-old Hon. Charles Lyell as their candidate to gain the seat. Lyell was commissioned as a lieutenant in the Forfar and Kincardine Artillery Militia in 1900.

== Campaign ==
Polling Day was fixed for 16 March 1904, 27 days after the previous MP went to the Lords.

== Result ==
The Liberals gained the seat from the Conservatives:

Lyell

East Dorset by-election, 1904
Party	Candidate	Votes	%	±%
Liberal	Charles Henry Lyell	5,929	53.7	+4.2
Conservative	Charles E. Van Raalte	5,109	46.3	−4.2
Majority		820	7.4	N/A
Turnout		11,038	87.0	+5.6
Liberal gain from Conservative		Swing	+4.2	

== Aftermath ==
At the following General Election the result was:

General election January 1906
Party	Candidate	Votes	%	±%
Liberal	Charles Henry Lyell	6,104	50.1	−3.6
Conservative	Charles E. Van Raalte	6,083	49.9	+3.6
Majority		21	0.2	−6.2
Turnout		12,187	89.9	+2.9
Liberal hold		Swing	-3.6	
