= Battle of the Great Redan =

1855 battle of the Crimean War

- Part of the siege of Sevastopol (Crimean War)
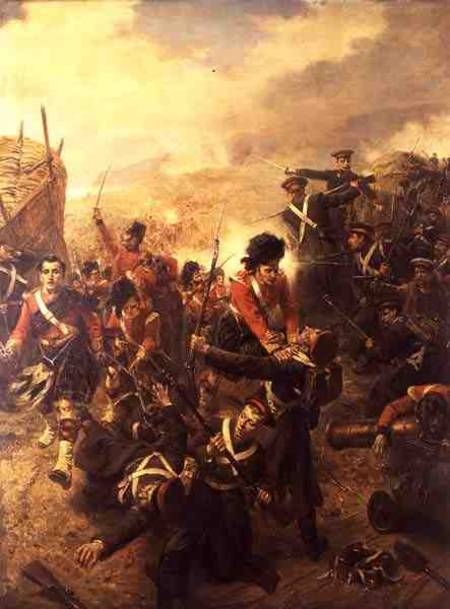
- The Attack on the Redan by Robert Alexander Hillingford
Date	8 September 1855
Location	Great Redan, Sevastopol, Taurida Governorate, Russian Empire 44°35′51.03″N 33°32′24.71″E
Result	Russian victory

Belligerents
British Empire	Russian Empire

Commanders and leaders
James Simpson; General John Campbell †; Colonel Lord West; Colonel Lacy Yea †	Mikhail Gorchakov

Strength
11,000 (Note: c. 11,000 engaged (of these, c. 4,900 participated in the fighting according to Micheal Clodfelter).)	7,500 (Note: c. 7,500 engaged (of these, c. 4,000 participated in the fighting according to Micheal Clodfelter).)

Casualties and losses
2,620 to 4,179 dead, wounded or missing	Unknown

The Battle of the Great Redan (or the Storming of the Third Bastion; Russian: Оборона Третьего бастиона, Штурм третьего бастиона) was a major battle during the Crimean War, fought between British forces against Russia on 18 June and 8 September 1855 as a part of the Siege of Sevastopol. The French army successfully stormed the Malakoff redoubt, whereas a simultaneous British attack on the Great Redan to the south of the Malakoff was repulsed. Contemporary commentators have suggested that, although the Redan became so important to the Victorians, it was probably not vital to the taking of Sevastopol. The fort at Malakhov was much more important and it was in the French sphere of influence. When the French stormed it after an eleven-month siege, the British attack on the Redan became somewhat unnecessary.

== Background ==
Russia attacked the Ottoman Empire in 1853, aiming for territorial aggrandisement, but their invasion was repulsed. In early 1854 the British and French governments issued an ultimatum to Russia that they should cease their aggression against the Ottomans, but this was refused, resulting in a state of war existing between these states. The Franco-British navies entered the Black Sea with the intent of destroying the Russian fleet. After destroying the secondary naval base at Odessa their attention turned to the main Russian base at Sevastopol.

Landing at Eupatoria, the allies swept aside the Russian army at the Battle of the Alma. The allies then marched to Sevastopol and invested it. Russian attempts to break the siege failed, and the French refused to make aggressive movements against the Russian fortifications, even refusing to attack after the "second bombardment". This changed on 16 May 1855 when Pélissier assumed command of the French Army, and agreed with the British commander Lord Raglan that the Russian fortifications should be assaulted. This led to three allied offensives in the summer of 1855, the last of which overwhelmed the Russian defences.

By spring of 1855 the British controlled the central sector of the allied line. The British "right attack" faced the Russian "Bastion No. 3" commonly called the "Great Redan". The British "left attack" faced "Bastion No. 4", called the "Flagstaff Bastion" by the British. On the left the French 1eme Corps faced Bastions no. 4, 5 and 6 (it being an angle in the Russian line the British and French sectors met at Bastion No. 4) and the right the French 2eme Corps faced Bastions No. 2 (Little Redan) and No. 3 (Malakoff).

== First offensive, 6–9 June 1855 ==
The first allied offensive was intended to gain ground and advance the parallels. After several days of bombardment the two attacks, one British and one French, were completely successful and the allies held all their gains against heavy Russian counterattacks. The British attack was against "The Quarries" and was carried out by parts of the Light and 2nd Divisions (right attack). They advanced the lines sufficiently that the Great Redan was within attack range. A simultaneous attack on the Mamelon by the French enabled them to advance their parallels against the Malakoff.

== Second offensive, 17–18 June 1855 ==
With the successes of early June, it was decided to attempt a general assault against the whole Russian line. On 17 June the "fourth bombardment" silenced the Russian batteries and an assault on the 18th was proposed. Lord Raglan proposed a further two hours of bombardment to destroy any repairs that had been made during the night and suppress the defences. Pélissier proposed to attack at dawn (0300 hrs) without further preparation, and Raglan agreed to attack as soon as practicable after the French assault went in.

The British assault force consisted of three brigades, with the plan being to occupy the flanks of the Great Redan with 1st brigade, Light Division under Colonel Yea on the right and 1st brigade, 4th Division under Major General Sir John Campbell on the left. Then a brigade of the 2nd Division under Colonel Charles Trollop would assault the Redan proper. The other four brigades of these three divisions (2nd Division had three brigades at this time) were in reserve ready to attack past the Redan. On the left attack Sir Richard England's 3rd Division was ordered to make a demonstration against Redoubt No. 4, and the 1st Division was brought up as a final reserve.

The French dawn attack was a debacle. The Russians had, as Raglan predicted, repaired their works and manned them ready to receive the assault. The French unfortunately blundered their preparations, and were detected whilst still moving to their assembly areas. The aggressive Russians immediately sent heavy fighting patrols out to engage the French in their assembly areas and, knowing they had been discovered, the local French commanders launched their attack nearly an hour before the three signal rockets were fired at 0300 hrs to initiate the attack. Hence the majority of the French assaults units had not reached their start positions, which on the French right attack were 400-600 yards from the enemy because they had not dug forward. The French were being slaughtered in the wide open killing areas.

Raglan, seeing the French being slaughtered, launched his attack to divert Russian attention and allow the French to retreat. Only Yea's and Campbell's brigades (10 battalions) advanced, and they were caught in a crossfire and suffered heavy casualties, including both brigade commanders. The attack was aborted, and the British suffered 1,433 casualties, almost all in the two attacking brigades and almost all within a few dozen yards of the start line.

In the aftermath of the attack the French were unwilling to launch another attack until they had dug their way forward and secured a good start line. This took six weeks. The allies had used the distraction of the attack to move forces across the River Chernaya, which precipitated a Russian counterattack in August and a further bombardment (fifth) which lasted for ten days, but was not followed by an attack as French preparations were incomplete.

== Third and final offensive, 7–9 September 1855 ==
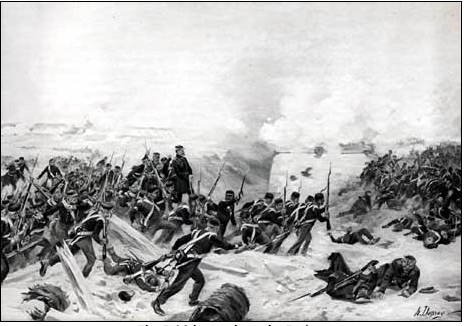
British attack the Great Redan

With the French having dug forward the allies planned to launch another attack, and the plan was set on 3 September. The attack would open with the French 2nd Corps assaulting the right sector, from the Little Redan to the Malakoff with up to 25,000 men. The British would then assault the Great Redan in the centre, and with that taken the French 1st Corps would assault the Flagstaff and Central Bastions.

On 7 September the bombardment opened, and continued until noon of the 8th. The French 1st Corps then launched their attack on the Malakoff and Little Redan, which were initially successful. The signal for the British to begin their assault (the flag of St. George raised over the Mamelon) was then made and the British then assaulted the Great Redan.

The British assault force was drawn from the Light and 2nd Divisions. Each division placed part of a battalion (200 men each) forward as skirmishers and held a brigade divided into two lines (assault and support) of two battalions (all of 500 men). Behind them the other brigade of the division was in reserve, and a final reserve consisting of 1st brigade, Highland Division with 1st brigade, 4th Division attached was behind them. On the left attack were the 1st and 3rd Divisions, and 2nd brigade of the 4th Division. Only the covering battalions, first assault line and half the supporting assault line (10 battalions) were engaged.

The two lead brigades were under the command of Acting Brigadier General Charles Ash Windham (known as the Hero of the Redan) and Brigadier General Horatio Shirley. In the face of devastating Russian fire, Shirley's brigade was driven back by a crossfire from the left, but Windham's brigade stormed the Great Redan and the broke the Vladimirski Regiment. Windham was promoted Major General out of turn for 'his distinguished conduct in having with the greatest intrepidity and coolness headed the column of attack which assaulted the enemy's defences.

Major Augusta Welsford commanded a ladder party in the initial wave the assault on the Great Redan. He crossed a broad open space of 400 metres while against a hail of bullets. He made it to a ditch in front of the work and proceeded to climb one of the ladders which had been placed against the counterscarp. As he rose above the lip of an embrasure at the top, a gun was fired from within which blew his head off. Welsford was highly regarded in his regiment.

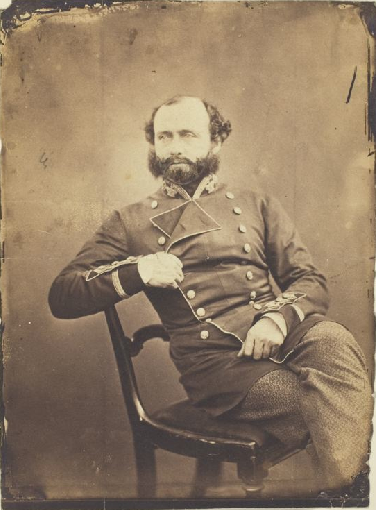
Sir Charles Ash Windham – "Hero of the Redan"

The other Nova Scotian officer, William Buck Carthew Augustus Parker also crossed the 400 metres field under fire, successfully scaled the counterscarp, got inside the work, and made a vain attempt to stem the mounting British retreat before a hail of bullets swept him into the ditch.

Windham's brigade had stormed and occupied the Redan, routing the defenders, and the signal (signal rockets fired from the Lancaster Battery) was made to General la Salles, commanding the French 1st Corps, to assault the Flagstaff Bastion (which the British left attack would co-operate with). However, la Salles failed to promptly launch his attack and the guns of the Flagstaff Bastion swept the approaches to the Great Redan, stopping the British supports coming forward. For two hours Windham's men held the Great Redan, and the British infantry put a heavy fire on the Russian reserve line.

The local Russian commander, Colonel Ventsel of the Vladimirski Regiment, was unable to rally his panicked troops, but as senior officer on the ground ordered the Selenginski and Iakutski regiments to make a charge with the bayonet. The British troops occupying the Redan had been fighting for hours and were short on ammunition. With the French on the left not launching their attack, and 3,000 Russians in close order columns coming on with the bayonet. Windham ordered a withdrawal to the ditch in front of the Great Redan. The Selenginski reoccupied the Redan, and repulsed some minor attacks by the British infantry. The French 1st Corps finally launched a faltering attack, but halted it.

The French attacks on the Malakoff and Little Redan and the British attacks on the Great Redan were initially successful, but the geography of the Malakoff (a tower surrounded by a moat) enabled the French to retain possession of the position in spite of heavy Russian counterattacks. The two Redans, being essentially open-backed walls, were not suitable for defence from the rear, and could not be maintained without large numbers. Both the French and the British in these positions could not hold them.

James Simpson, commander of the British Army following the death of Lord Raglan, ordered another assault the next morning by the Highland and 3rd Divisions, but at 2300 hrs the Russians exploded their magazines and retreated from the Great Redan. It was occupied at dawn by the highlanders. The Siege of Sevastopol was over, and the Russian Black Sea Fleet annihilated.

== Casualties ==
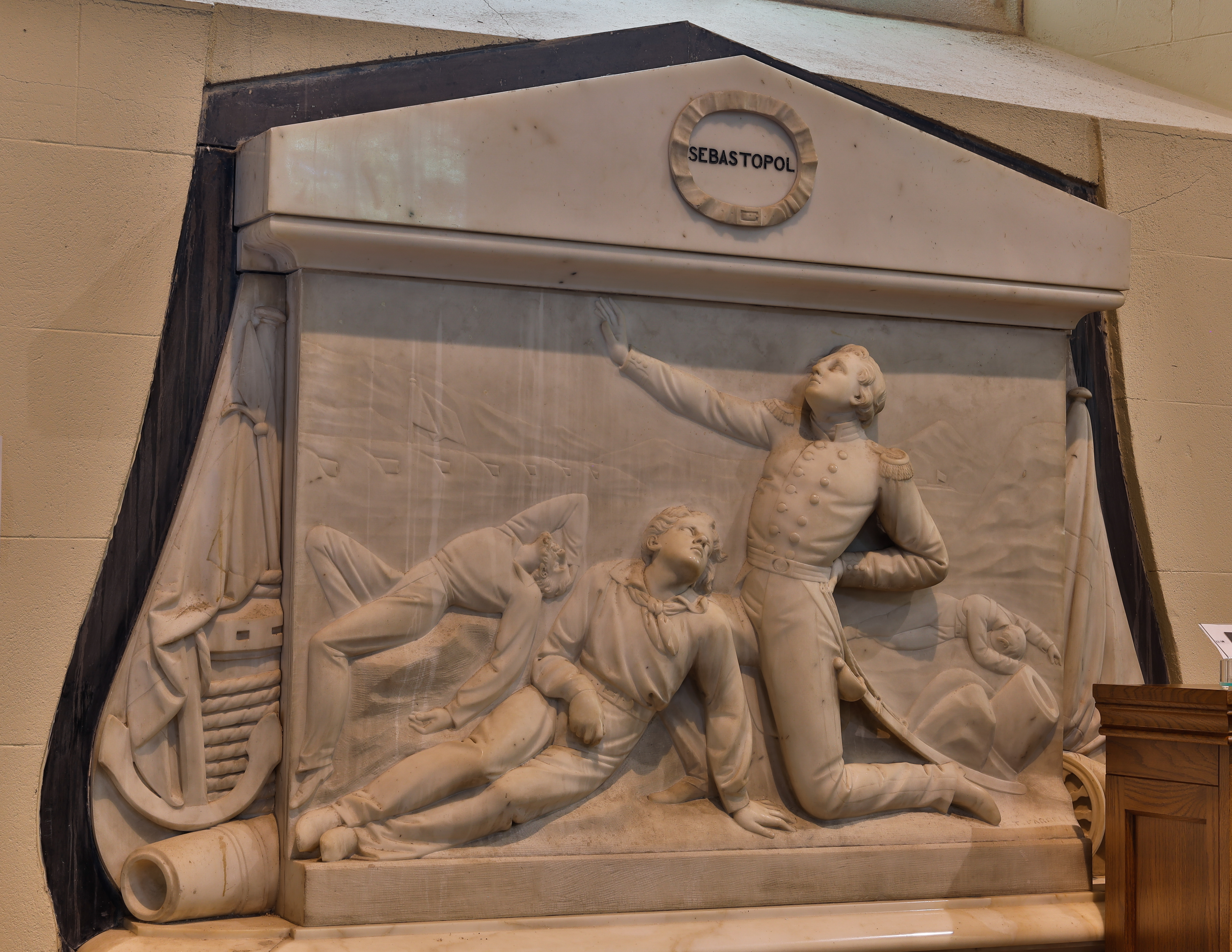
Memorial by Thomas Farrell in St. Patrick's Cathedral, Armagh, for Lieutenant Thomas Osborne Kidd who was killed on 18 June 1855 when he tried to recover some wounded men.

In the first attack (18 June 1855) the British suffered 1,433 casualties, vis 155 killed, 1,126 wounded and 152 missing. Around half the wounded were classified as "slightly wounded" According to other sources, the British lost 1,728 men.

In the second attack the British suffered 2,447 casualties, vis 385 killed, 1,886 wounded and 176 missing. The approximately 2/3rds of the wounded were classified as "slightly wounded".

Russian casualties for these actions are conflated with the French attacks that occurred simultaneously. On 18 June the Russians suffered 4,352 casualties (700 killed, 2828 severely wounded, 860 slightly wounded and 14 missing). On 8 September they suffered 11,692 casualties (2,685 killed, 6,064 severely wounded, 1,180 slightly wounded and 1,764 missing). Russian losses on 18 June they may exceed 4,818, but they fell mainly on the day of the bombing, not the assault.

== Orders of Battle, 8 September 1855 ==
Russian Army First Line (left to right; ca. 7,500 engaged)

- Suzdal'ski Regiment (2 battalions)
- Iakutski Regiment (2 battalions)
- Vladimirski Regiment (2 battalions) manning the "Great Redan" (Redoubt no. 3) proper
- Kamchatski Regiment (2 battalions)
- Composite reserve regiment
- Okhotski Regiment (2 battalions) manning the Peresyp

Reserve

- Selenginski Regiment

Second line was unengaged.

British Army Right Attack (15 battalions, ca. 11,000 engaged)

Assault Force

- 2nd Brigade, Light Division (19th, 88th, 90th and 97th Foot) with 2nd Bn, Rifle Brigade covering (attached from 1st Bde, Light Div) under Brigadier General Horatio Shirley (19th and 88th Foot did not assault)
- 2nd Brigade, 2nd Division (41st, 47th, 49th and 62nd Foot) with 3rd Foot covering (attached from 1st Bde, 2nd Div) under Acting brigadier-general Charles Windham

Support Force

- 1st Brigade, Light Division (7th, 23rd, 33rd, 34th) with 77th Foot attached (from 2nd Bde, Light Div) under brigadier-general Charles van Straubenzee
- 1st Brigade, 2nd Division (2/1st, 30th, 55th and 95th Foot) under brigadier-general Charles Warren (95th did not assault)

The Left attack and the reserve force of the right attack were not engaged. The support force of 2nd Brigade, Light Division (19th and 88th Foot) and the 95th Foot did not attack.

== Legacy ==
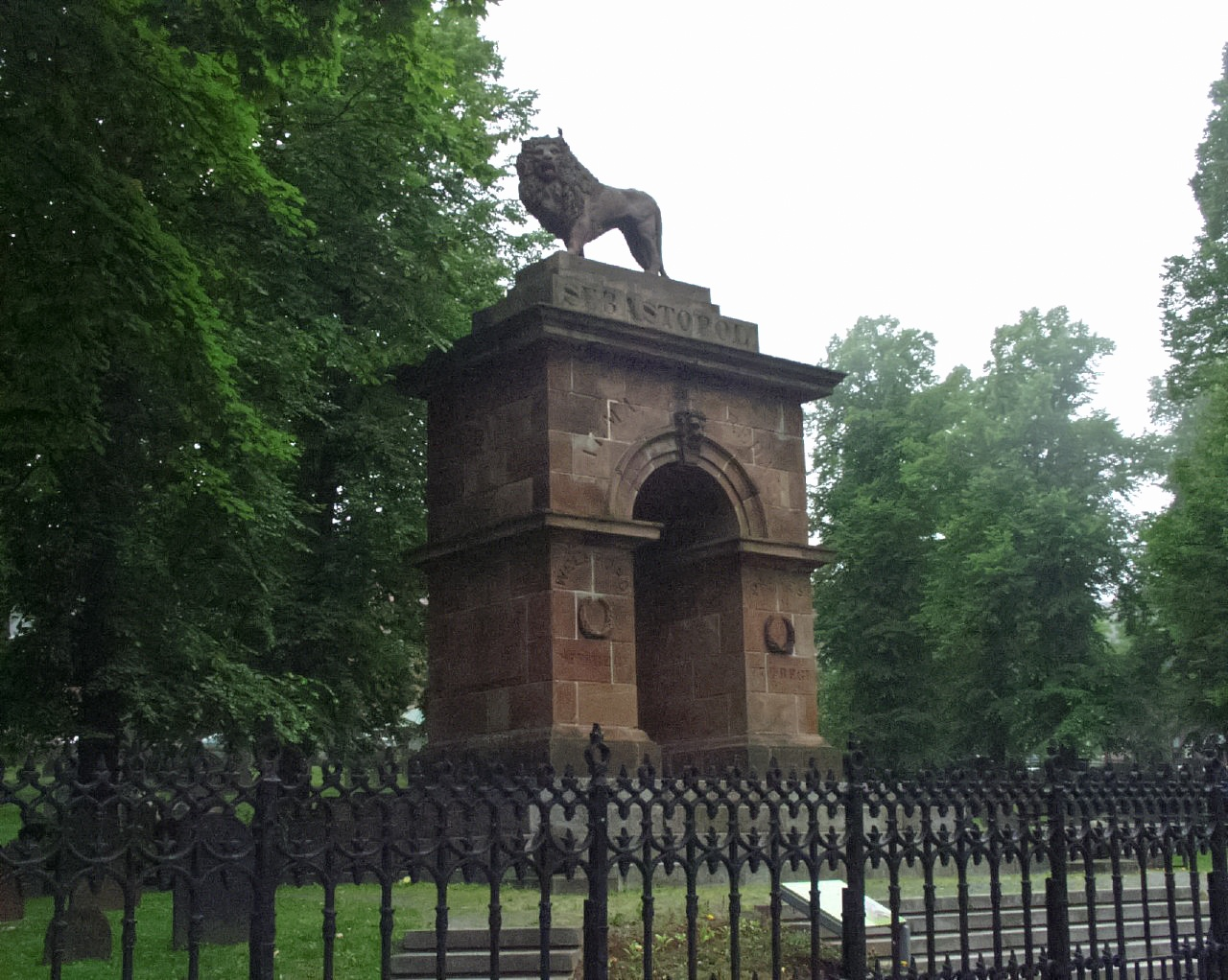
Sebastopol Monument, Halifax, Nova Scotia – a monument to the soldiers who died in the Battle of the Great Redan

- Namesake of the vessel "Hero of the Redan"
- Namesake of redan holes in golf course architecture;
- The Redan Inn (now The Quarterdeck) in North Berwick
- Redan Inn in Chilcompton, Somerset
- Redan Street, Shepherd's Bush, London
- Redan, suburb of Ballarat, Victoria, Australia
- Redan Street, St Kilda, Victoria, Australia
- Redan Road, Caulfield North, Victoria, Australia
- The Redan [Pub], corner of Queensway and Westbourne Grove, London W2; its sign carries an illustration of the battle
- The Redan public house on Thorpe Road in Norwich was originally named The Hero of the Redan, in reference to Major-General Charles Ashe Windham
- The Redan, an area of Maryhill, Glasgow former pub called 'The Redan' on Maryhill Road, Glasgow
- Redan Hill Road, Aldershot in Hampshire
- The monument to the British soldiers that was erected on site of the battle field the following year was destroyed in World War II
- Memorial to fallen Thomas Edwin Roberts, Royal Welsh Fusileers, Sergeant, of Holywell, North Wales.
