= George Hawkesworth Bond =

British politician

Member of Parliament for East Dorset
- In office 1 July 1886 – 5 November 1891
- Preceded by: Pascoe Glyn
- Succeeded by: Humphrey Sturt

Personal details
- Born: 1845
- Died: 1891 (aged 45–46)
- Party: Conservative

George Hawkesworth Bond (1845–1891) was a British politician who was Member of Parliament for East Dorset from 1886 to 1891.

During a discussion of political slander in an 1895 debate of an amendment to the Corrupt and Illegal Practices Prevention Act 1883, Conservative MP Elliott Lees recounted how Bond had been dogged by a rumour that he had said that a red herring (a small preserved fish then associated with poverty) was a sufficient dinner for a working man. This created outrage among his constituents, some of whom protested by bringing the fish to meetings. Lees reported that, even eight years after Bond's death, when he expressed regret at the loss of Bond to another man, the man replied "Yes, but I do think that it was a pity he said that about a working man's dinner".
