= Andrew Glyn =

British economist

- Born: 30 June 1943; Tetsworth, England
- Died: 22 December 2007 (aged 64); Oxford, England
- Occupations: Academic, economist

Academic work
- Discipline: Economics
- Sub-discipline: Unemployment, Economic inequality
- Institutions: Corpus Christi College, Oxford
- Notable works: Oxford Review of Economic Policy

Andrew John Glyn (30 June 1943 – 22 December 2007) was an English economist, University Lecturer in Economics at the University of Oxford and Fellow and Tutor in Economics in Corpus Christi College. A Marxian economist, his research interests focused on issues of unemployment and inequality.

He was Associate Editor of Oxford Review of Economic Policy. He was a consultant for the National Union of Mineworkers (NUM) and for the International Labour Organisation.

== Background ==
Glyn was born in Tetsworth, Oxfordshire. He was the son of John Glyn, the 6th Baron Wolverton, of the Williams & Glyn's Bank banking dynasty. He attended Eton and went on to study economics at Oxford University before becoming a government economist from 1964 to 1966. He was appointed to a fellowship in economics at Corpus Christi where he worked for the rest on his life. During his time at Oxford he tutored both David and Ed Miliband: Ed Miliband's adviser Stewart Wood has described Glyn as Miliband's biggest intellectual influence.

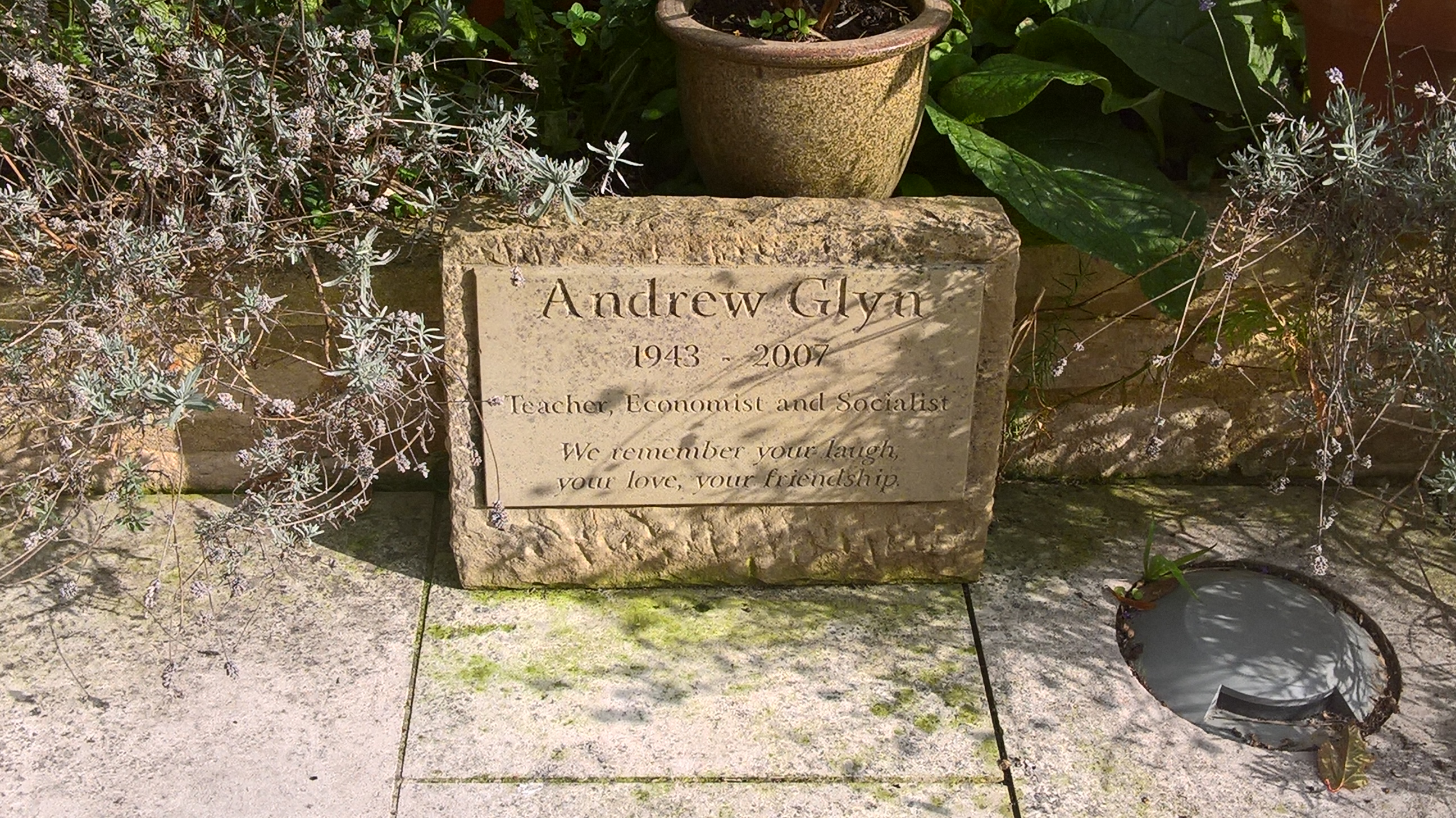
Andrew Glyn's memorial at Corpus Christi College

On 22 December 2007, he died of a brain cancer at the Sobell House hospice in Oxford.

== Politics ==
In the 1970s and early 1980s Glyn was a member of the Trotskyist Militant tendency in Oxford, writing a pamphlet critiquing the 'Alternative Economic Strategy' of the Tribune group of MPs, Capitalist Crisis or Socialist Plan in 1978.

In 1984 Glyn wrote The Economic Case Against Pit Closures for the National Union of Mineworkers to counter the energy policy of the Thatcher government.

== Published books ==
- Capitalism Unleashed. Oxford University Press, 2006.
- Social democracy in neoliberal times : the left and economic policy since 1980. Oxford University Press, 2001.
- Colliery closures and the decline of the UK coal industry, with Stephen Machin. Oxford : Institute of Economics and Statistics, University of Oxford, 1996.
- The North, the South, and the environment : ecological constraints and the global economy, with V. Bhaskar. St. Martin's Press, 1995.
- A Million Jobs a Year. Verso, 1985.
- Capitalism Since World War II: The Making and Breakup of the Great Boom, with Philip Armstrong and John Harrison. Fontana, 1984. 2nd edition as Capitalism Since 1945, Blackwells 1991. Also translated into Chinese and Korean.
- The British Economic Disaster, with John Harrison. Pluto, 1980; (also translated into Japanese).
- British Capitalism, Workers and the Profit Squeeze, with Bob Sutcliffe. Penguin, 1972; also translated into Italian, German, and Japanese.
- Capitalism in crisis, with Robert B Sutcliffe. Pantheon Books, 1972.
- British capitalism, workers and the profits squeeze with Robert B Sutcliffe. Penguin, 1972.

== Other published works ==
He published 36 peer-reviewed journal articles, many book chapters and a number of essays. He additionally wrote a number of magazine articles and newspaper columns, including those in The Guardian, Financial Times, New Statesman, and The New York Times.
