= Sidney Glyn =

British politician (1835–1916)

Captain Sidney Carr Glyn (11 October 1835 – 26 February 1916) was a British Liberal Party politician.

Glyn was a younger son of George Glyn, 1st Baron Wolverton, and his first wife Marianne, daughter of Pascoe Grenfell. George Glyn, 2nd Baron Wolverton, and Vice-admiral the Hon. Henry Carr Glyn were his elder brothers, while the Right Reverend the Hon. Edward Glyn, Bishop of Peterborough, was his younger brother. At the age of 19, he enlisted as an ensign in the Rifle Brigade (1st Battalion) gaining his commission and reaching the rank of captain in 1863 and serving until his discharge in 1872. He was elected at the 1880 general election as the Member of Parliament (MP) for Shaftesbury, and held the seat until the constituency was abolished at the 1885 general election.

Glyn married Fanny, daughter of Adolphe Marescaux, in 1868. He died on 26 February 1916, aged 80.

== See also ==
- Baron Wolverton
- Glyn baronets

Parliament of the United Kingdom
Preceded by Vere Fane Benett-Stanford	Member of Parliament for Shaftesbury; 1880–1885	Constituency abolished
