= Glyn baronets of Ewell (1759) =

Escutcheon of the Glyn baronets of Ewell

The Glyn baronetcy, of Ewell in the County of Surrey, was created in the Baronetage of Great Britain on 29 September 1759 for Richard Glyn. He was a merchant and banker, Lord Mayor of London 1758 to 1759. He represented the City of London in Parliament from 1758 to 1768, and Coventry from 1768 to 1773.

In 1942 the title was inherited by Sir Richard Fitzgerald Glyn, 4th Baronet of the 1800 creation, who became also the 8th Baronet of Ewell as well. The 9th Baronet was a Conservative politician.

== Glyn baronets, of Ewell (1759) ==
- Sir Richard Glyn, 1st Baronet (1711–1773)
- Sir George Glyn, 2nd Baronet (c. 1739–1814)
- Sir Lewen Powell Glyn, 3rd Baronet (1801–1840)
- Sir George Lewen Glyn, 4th Baronet (1804–1885)
- Sir George Turbervill Glyn, 5th Baronet (1841–1891)
- Sir Gervas Powell Glyn, 6th Baronet (1862–1921)
- Sir Arthur Robert Glyn, 7th Baronet (1870–1942)
- Sir Richard Fitzgerald Glyn, 8th Baronet (1875–1960)
- Sir Richard Hamilton Glyn, 9th Baronet (1907–1980)
- Sir Richard Lindsay Glyn, 10th Baronet (born 1943)

The heir apparent is the present holder's son Richard Rufus Francis Glyn (born 1971).

== Notes ==
Baronetage of Great Britain
Preceded by Yea baronets	Glyn baronets of Ewell; 29 September 1759	Succeeded by Colebrooke baronets
