= Edward Carr Glyn =

Bishop of Peterborough, England

The Right Reverend Edward Carr Glyn
- Bishop of Peterborough
- Portrait by Walter Stoneman, 1916
- Diocese: Diocese of Peterborough
- In office: 1897–1916
- Predecessor: Mandell Creighton
- Successor: Theodore Woods

Orders
- Ordination: 1868
- Consecration: 1897 by Frederick Temple (Canterbury)

Personal details
- Denomination: Anglican
- Born: 21 November 1843; St George Hanover Square, London, England
- Died: 14 November 1928 (aged 84); St George Hanover Square, London, England
- Education: University College, Oxford
- Father: George Glyn, 1st Baron Wolverton
- Relatives: George Glyn (brother); Sidney Glyn (brother); Pascoe Glyn (brother)

Edward Carr Glyn (21 November 1843 – 14 November 1928) was an Anglican bishop in England in the late 19th century and the early 20th century. He was the Bishop of Peterborough from 1897 to 1916.

== Life ==
Born in St George Hanover Square, London, Glyn was a younger son of George Glyn, 1st Baron Wolverton and Marianne, daughter of Pascoe Grenfell. He was the brother of George Glyn, 2nd Baron Wolverton, Sidney Glyn, Pascoe Glyn and Henry Glyn, a vice-admiral in the Royal Navy. He was educated at Harrow School and University College, Oxford and ordained in 1868.

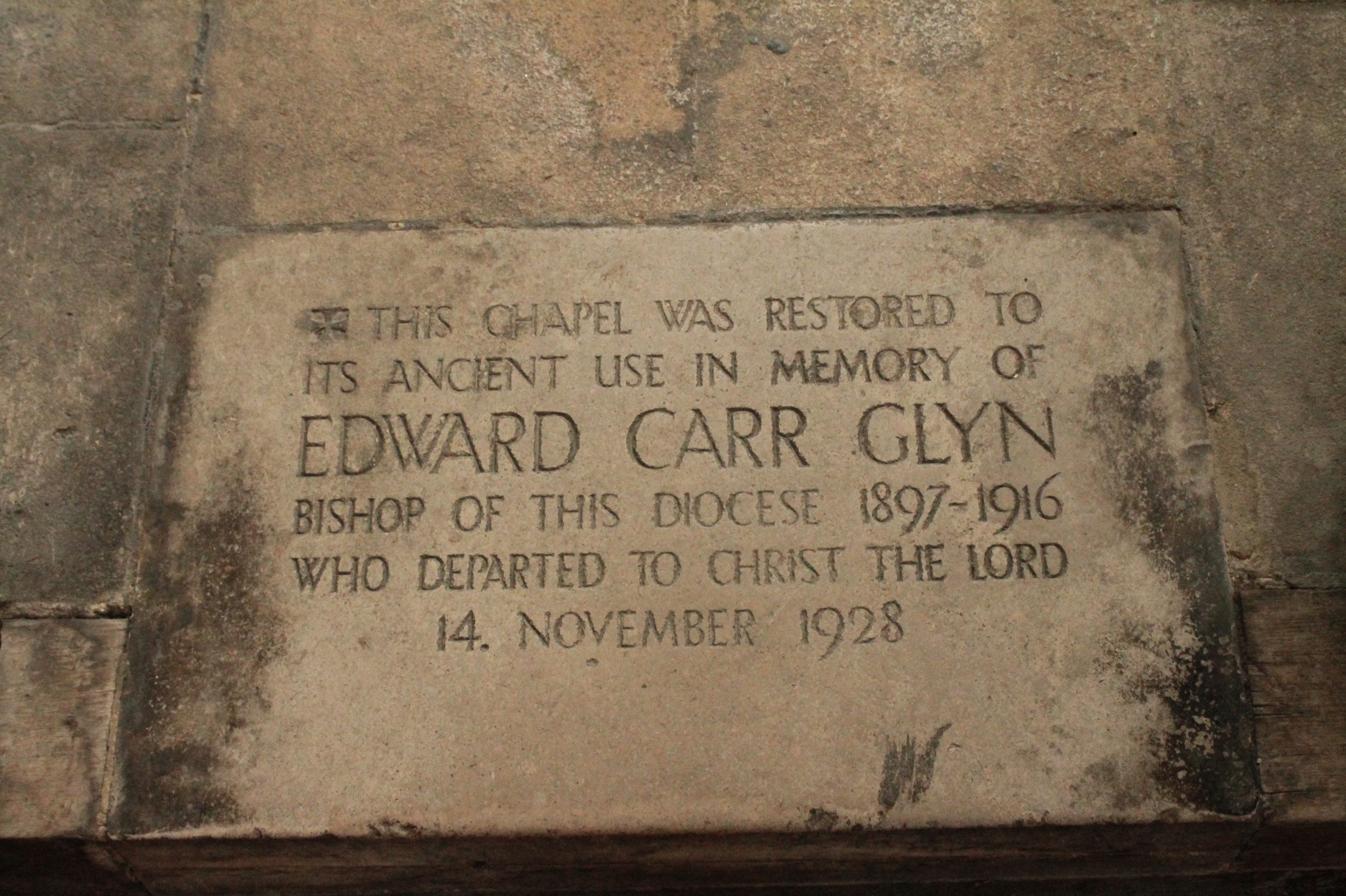
Memorial to Edward Carr Glyn, Peterborough Cathedral

After a curacy in Doncaster, Carr Glyn was the domestic chaplain to William Thomson, the Archbishop of York, and then held incumbencies at St Mary's Church, Beverley, St George's Church, Doncaster and St Mary Abbots Church, Kensington He became an Honorary Chaplain to the Queen and was the Bishop of Peterborough from 1897 until 1916. His election to the See of Peterborough was confirmed at St Mary-le-Bow on 22 February and he was consecrated a bishop on St Matthias' Day (24 February 1897), by Frederick Temple, Archbishop of Canterbury, at St Paul's Cathedral.

Carr Glyn displayed his total support for British involvement in the First World War three weeks after War was declared. In a sermon in the Cathedral for Christians of all denominations, he said ‘This war has been unsought and undesired by us. We are not fighting for increase of dominion or for enlargement of territory, but in spite of every endeavour to maintain the peace of Europe we now find ourselves necessarily and inevitably involved in a war which in severity and endurance is likely to surpass the recorded wars of English history’. He praised parents, sisters, lovers and friends for letting family members go off to the War. He sanctioned a prayer for animals suffering in the War, instituted parochial Rolls of Honour of those serving in the forces and had church bells ring at noon each day as a call to private prayer. He lost a son in the War.

Carr Glyn died in St George on 14 November 1928, aged 84.

== Family ==
He married Lady Mary Emma, daughter of George Campbell, 8th Duke of Argyll, in 1882. She died in March 1947, aged 87. They had several children, including Ralph Glyn, 1st Baron Glyn. and Margaret Isabel Frances, who married Admiral Herbert Meade.

Church of England titles
Preceded by Mandell Creighton	Bishop of Peterborough; 1897–1916	Succeeded by Theodore Woods
