= Humphrey Sturt, 2nd Baron Alington =

British politician (1859–1919)

The Right Honourable The Lord Alington KCVO
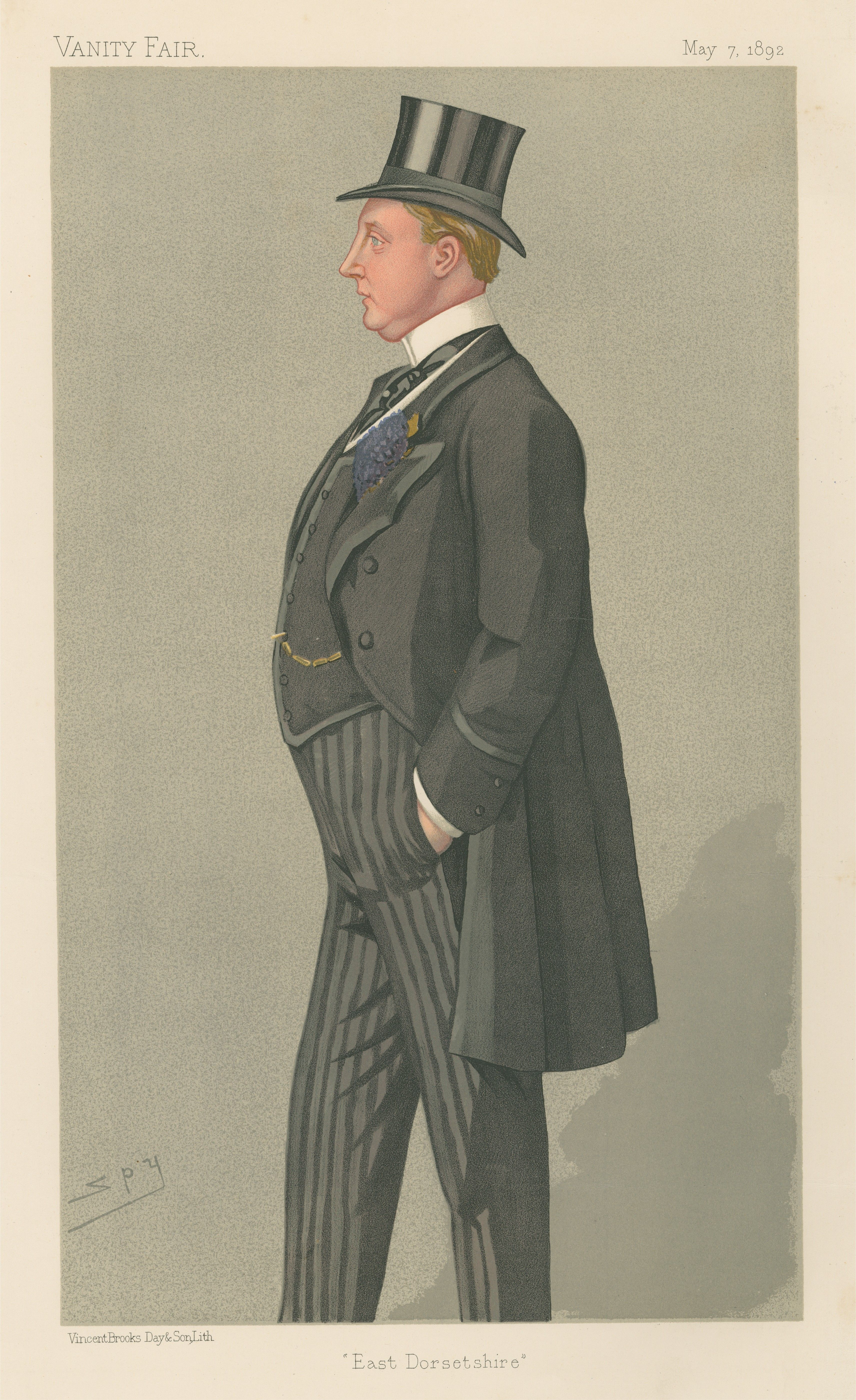
- "East Dorsetshire". Caricature by Spy published in Vanity Fair in 1892.

Member of Parliament for East Dorset
- In office 1891–1904
- Preceded by: George Hawkesworth Bond
- Succeeded by: Charles Henry Lyell
- Majority: 4,776 (50.5%)

Personal details
- Born: Humphrey Napier Sturt; 20 August 1859
- Died: 30 July 1919 (aged 59)
- Party: Conservative
- Spouse: Feodorowna Yorke (m. 1883)
- Children: Lois Morgan, Viscountess Tredegar; Diana Brougham; Sylvia Sturt; Gerard Sturt; Napier Sturt, 3rd Baron Alington
- Parents: Henry Sturt, 1st Baron Alington; Augusta Bingham
- Occupation: Politician

Humphrey Napier Sturt, 2nd Baron Alington, KCVO (20 August 1859 – 30 July 1919) was a British peer and Conservative politician.

== Career ==
Sturt was the son of Henry Sturt, 1st Baron Alington. He was elected a Member of Parliament for the East Dorset division in an 1891 by-election. In late 1902 he indicated his intention not to seek re-election, but he succeeded to the barony in February 1904 and automatically triggered another by-election.

== Family ==
Sturt married on 25 June 1883 Lady Féodorovna Yorke, daughter of Charles Philip Yorke, 5th Earl of Hardwicke. In 1897, she was one of the guests at the Duchess of Devonshire's Diamond Jubilee Costume Ball.

They had six children.

- Lois Sturt (born 25 August 1900 – 1937)
- Diana Isabel Sturt (born 3 April 1884)
- Sylvia Sturt (born and died 1886)
- Olivia Sturt (born 11 February 1899 and died 20 February 1899)
- Captain Gerard Philip Montagu Napier Sturt (1893–1918) (died of wounds)
- Napier George Henry Sturt, 3rd Baron Alington (1896–1940) (died of illness serving with the RAF)

== Death ==
He died on Wednesday, 30 July 1919.

Parliament of the United Kingdom
Preceded by George Hawkesworth Bond	Member of Parliament for East Dorset; 1891–1904	Succeeded by Charles Henry Lyell
Peerage of the United Kingdom
Preceded by Henry Sturt	Baron Alington; 1904–1919	Succeeded by Napier Sturt
