= Glyn baronets =

Set index for Glyn baronets

There have been three baronetcies created for members of the Glyn family, two in the Baronetage of Great Britain and one in the Baronetage of the United Kingdom. The last is extinct.

- Glyn baronets of Ewell (1759)
- Glyn baronets of Gaunt's House (1800)
- Glyn baronets of Farnborough Downs (1934): see Baron Glyn

== See also ==
- Glynne baronets
- Baron Wolverton
