= 1921 East Dorset by-election =

British by-election

The 1921 East Dorset by-election was a parliamentary by-election held for the British House of Commons constituency of East Dorset on 16 April 1921.

== Vacancy ==
The by-election was caused by the appointment of the sitting MP for East Dorset, Freddie Guest, to the office of Secretary of State for Air. Under the Parliamentary procedures of the day, he was obliged to resign his seat and fight a by-election.

== Candidates ==
Guest re-contested the seat for the Coalition government of David Lloyd George. As its representative, he was supported by Liberals and Unionists. He was to be opposed for Labour by the Reverend Fred Hopkins, a Methodist minister and former brickyard worker from the age of just ten years but Hopkins was reported to be very ill at the time for nominations and the local Labour Party decided not to contest the by-election. Hopkins stood for Parliament a number of times for Labour in different constituencies but was never elected.

== Result ==
The election was uncontested and Guest was returned unopposed. At this time the Coalition was experiencing a good run of by-election results and Labour was making little headway in opposing the government.

East Dorset By-Election 16 April 1921
Party	Candidate	Votes	%	±%
National Liberal	Freddie Guest	Unopposed	N/A	N/A
National Liberal hold				

== See also ==
- List of United Kingdom by-elections
- United Kingdom by-election records
