= George Glyn, 2nd Baron Wolverton =

British Liberal politician

The Lord Wolverton
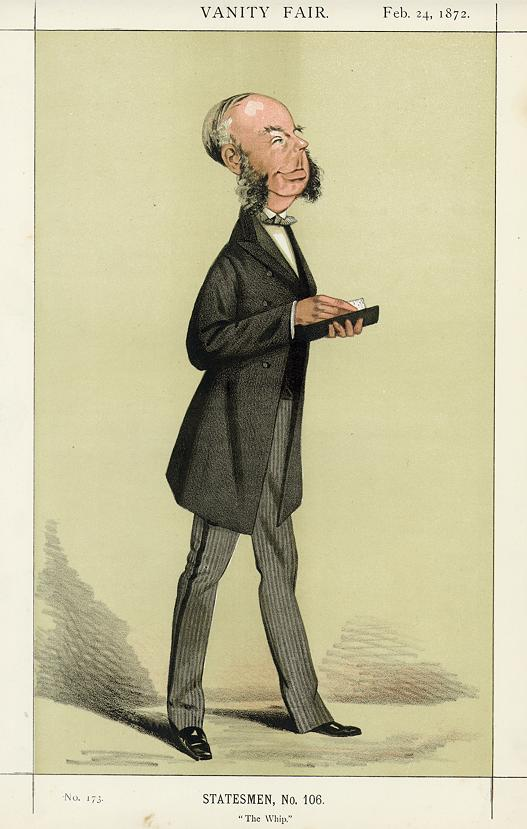
- "The Whip". Caricature by Cecioni published in Vanity Fair in 1872

Paymaster General
- In office 24 May 1880 – 9 June 1885
- Monarch: Victoria
- Preceded by: Hon. David Plunket
- Succeeded by: The Earl Beauchamp

Postmaster General
- In office 17 February 1886 – 20 July 1886
- Monarch: Victoria
- Preceded by: Lord John Manners
- Succeeded by: Henry Cecil Raikes

Personal details
- Born: 10 February 1824
- Died: 6 November 1887 (aged 63)
- Party: Liberal
- Spouse: Georgiana Tufnell (m. 1848)
- Parents: George Glyn, 1st Baron Wolverton (father); Marianne Grenfell (mother)
- Relatives: Pascoe Glyn (brother); Sidney Glyn (brother); Edward Carr Glyn (brother); Pascoe Grenfell (maternal grandfather)

George Grenfell Glyn, 2nd Baron Wolverton PC (10 February 1824 – 6 November 1887), was a British Liberal politician. He held office in three of the Liberal administrations of William Gladstone.

== Background ==
Wolverton was the eldest of the nine sons of the banker George Glyn, 1st Baron Wolverton, and his wife Marianne, daughter of Pascoe Grenfell. His grandfather Sir Richard Carr Glyn, 1st Baronet, of Gaunt's House, and great-grandfather Sir Richard Glyn, 1st Baronet, of Ewell, had been prominent London bankers, both had served as Lord Mayor of London.

== Political career ==
Wolverton was elected to Parliament for Shaftesbury as a Liberal in 1857, a seat he would hold until he succeeded his father in 1873 and entered the House of Lords. In 1868 he was appointed Parliamentary Secretary to the Treasury in William Gladstone's first administration, a post he held until 1873, when he was also admitted to the Privy Council. The Liberals lost office in 1874, but when Gladstone returned to power in 1880 Wolverton was appointed Paymaster General. He retained this office until Gladstone resigned in June 1885 and the Conservatives came to power under Lord Salisbury.

The same year the Liberal Party split over the issue of Irish Home Rule. Wolverton supported Gladstone and was rewarded when he was made Postmaster General in February 1886, when Gladstone became Prime Minister for a third time. However, the government fell already in July the same year.

== Iwerne Minster ==
In 1876 he bought the manorial estate at Iwerne Minster in Dorset from the Bower family, to which he made many changes and improvements, including the building of a large mansion designed by Alfred Waterhouse. Much of the farmland was turned over to parkland, and he pursued his passion for hunting, maintaining, till 1879, a pack of bloodhounds.

== Family ==
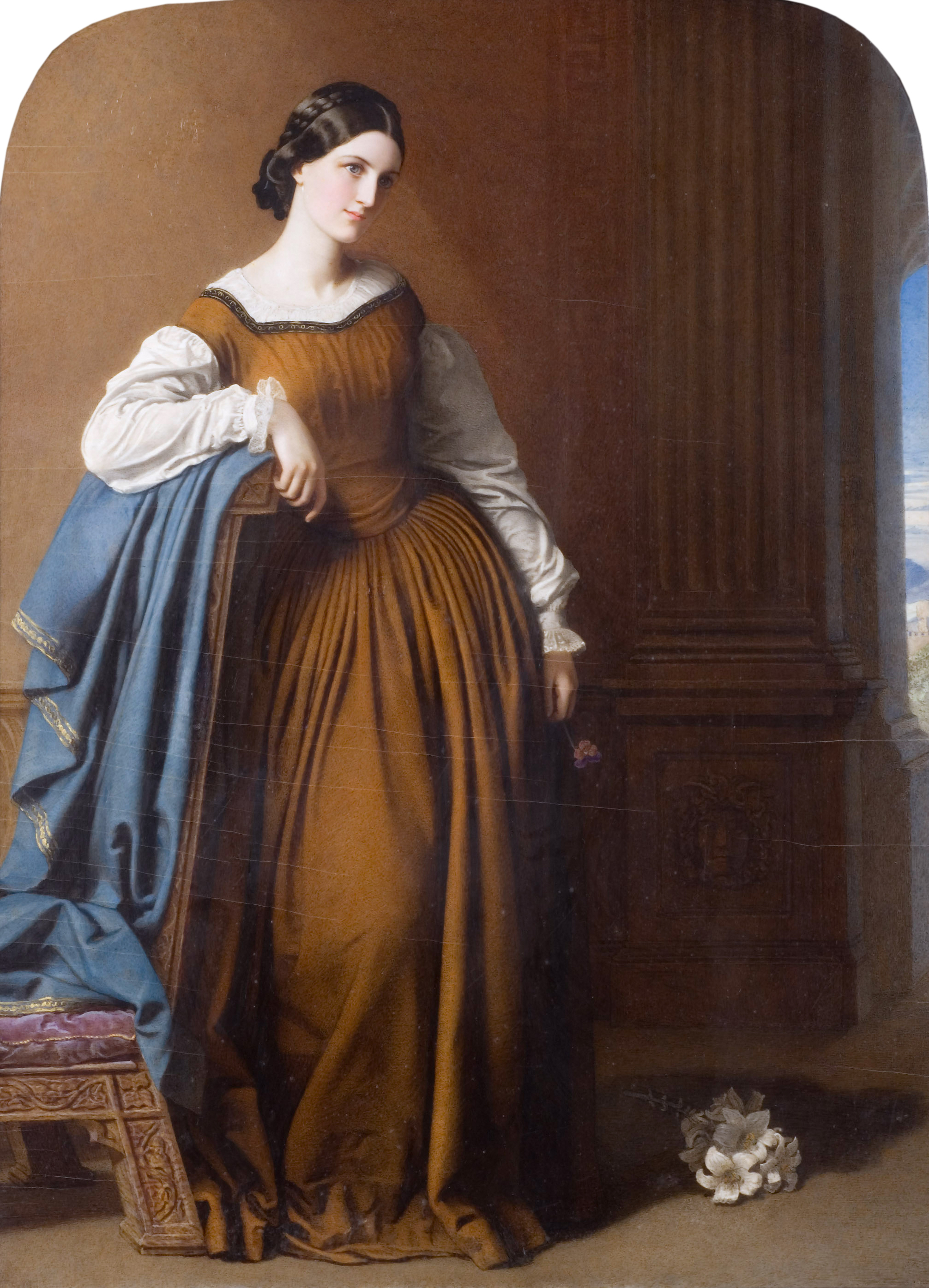
Georgiana Maria Tufnell (Robert Thorburn)

Lord Wolverton married Georgiana Maria Tufnell, daughter of Reverend George Tufnell, in 1848. They had no children. He died suddenly in November 1887, aged 63, and was succeeded in the barony by his nephew, Henry Glyn.

They lived at Warren House in Coombe, Kingston upon Thames. The small country house, now a Grade II listed conference centre, was built in the 1860s for Hugh Hammersley, and then extended 1884-6 by the architect George Devey.

== Arms ==
Coat of arms of George Glyn, 2nd Baron Wolverton
Coronet A coronet of an Baron Crest An eagle's head erased sable guttle d'or, in the beak an escallop argent. Escutcheon Argent an eagle displayed with two heads sable guttle d'or. Supporters Two eagles, wings elevated sable guttee d'or. Motto Fidei Tenax (Firm to my trust)

Parliament of the United Kingdom
Preceded by Hon. Henry Portman	Member of Parliament for Shaftesbury; 1857–1873	Succeeded by Vere Fane Benett-Stanford
Political offices
Preceded by Hon. Gerard Noel	Parliamentary Secretary to the Treasury; 1868–1873	Succeeded by Arthur Peel
Preceded by Hon. David Plunket	Paymaster General; 1880–1885	Succeeded by The Earl Beauchamp
Preceded by Lord John Manners	Postmaster General; 1886	Succeeded by Henry Cecil Raikes
Peerage of the United Kingdom
Preceded by George Carr Glyn	Baron Wolverton; 1873–1887	Succeeded by Henry Richard Glyn
