= George Glyn, 1st Baron Wolverton =

British banker (1797–1873)

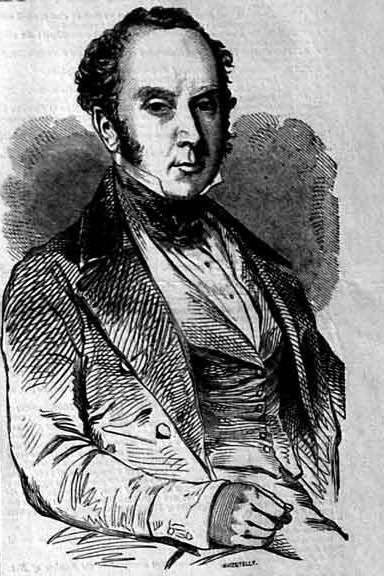
George Glyn in 1847

George Carr Glyn, 1st Baron Wolverton (27 March 1797 – 24 July 1873) was a banker with interests in the railways, a partner in the family firm of Glyn, Mills & Co., which was reputed to be the largest private bank in London.

== Background ==
He was the fourth son of Sir Richard Glyn, 1st Baronet, also a banker, and former Lord Mayor of London. His mother was the daughter of John Plumptre of Nottingham. The Wolvertons lived at the manor house in Iwerne Minster, two miles south of Fontmell, in Dorset. They also owned Gaunts House, Wimborne.

== Business career ==
Glyn and his bank were important in the development of the railways - hence the link with Wolverton. By the 1850s, over 200 railway companies, both domestic and foreign, banked with Glyn, Mills, and Co. In 1836 Glyn became Chairman of the North Midland Railway, and in 1837 the second Chairman of the London and Birmingham Railway. In 1841 he resigned his Chairmanship of the North Midland, but remained a director. In 1842, he founded the Railway Clearing House, an organization that helped determine payments by companies that operated trains to the many different companies that owned connecting tracks. In 1846, when the London and North Western Railway was formed, he was its Chairman until 1852. Glyn's bank served as one of the London agents for the provincial government of Canada, and in 1852 he was a promoter of the Grand Trunk Railway. He was the first President of The Railway Benevolent Society, upon its creation, at a meeting at the London Tavern, on 8 May 1858. George presided at this meeting and gave a speech outlining his aims for this society: The first aim was to benefit the widow and orphan. The second aim was to educate the child. A resolution was carried unanimously, at that meeting, stating that the society should be called the Railway Benevolent Institution.

== Political career ==
Apart from his business career Glyn also represented Kendal in the House of Commons from 1847 to 1868 as a Liberal yet he never fought an election. He was unopposed at every general election from 1847 up to and including his last contest in 1865, a total of five general elections without the need to politick for a single vote. On 14 December 1869 Glyn was raised to the peerage as Baron Wolverton, of Wolverton in the County of Buckingham.

== Family ==
Lord Wolverton married Marianne Grenfell, daughter of Pascoe Grenfell, MP for Penryn, on 17 March 1823. They had nine sons and two daughters. Several of his sons gained distinction.

- The Hon. Sidney Glyn and the Hon. Pascoe Glyn were both Members of Parliament.
- The Right Reverend the Hon. Edward Glyn was Bishop of Peterborough and the father of Ralph Glyn, 1st Baron Glyn.
- The Hon. Henry Carr Glyn was a vice-admiral in the Royal Navy.

== Death ==
Lord Wolverton died in July 1873, aged 76, and was succeeded in the barony by his eldest son George Grenfell Glyn. Lady Wolverton died in March 1892.

== Arms ==
Coat of arms of George Glyn, 1st Baron Wolverton
Coronet A coronet of an Baron Crest An eagle's head erased sable guttle d'or, in the beak an escallop argent. Escutcheon Argent an eagle displayed with two heads sable guttle d'or. Supporters Two eagles, wings elevated sable guttee d'or. Motto Fidei Tenax (Firm to my trust)

Parliament of the United Kingdom
Preceded by Henry Warburton	Member of Parliament for Kendal; 1847 – 1868	Succeeded by John Whitwell
Peerage of the United Kingdom
New creation	Baron Wolverton; 1869–1873	Succeeded by George Grenfell Glyn
