= Lady Wimborne Cottages =

Houses in Dorset, England

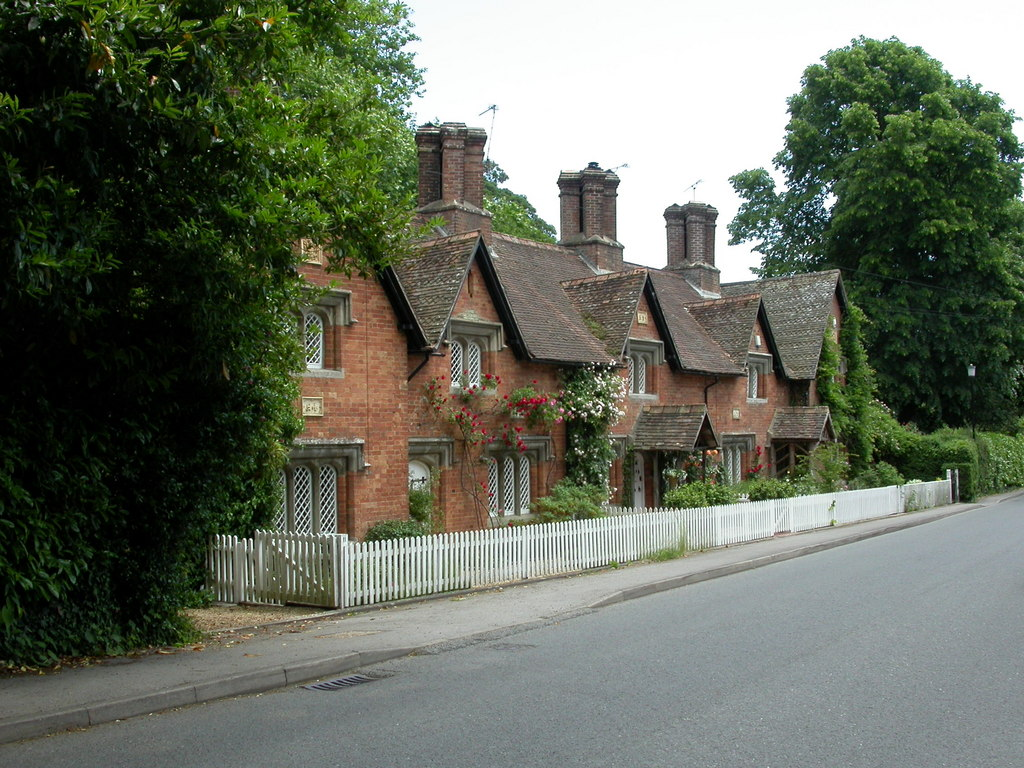
- Terraced cottages in Canford Magna

General information
- Architectural style: Gothic Revival
- Location: Ashington, Dorset, Canford Magna, Hamworthy, Merley, Poole
- Named for: Cornelia Guest, Baroness Wimborne
- Construction started: 1867
- Completed: 1904
- Client: Ivor Guest, 1st Baron Wimborne

Design and construction
- Architect: Charles Barry Jr.
- Other designers: George Jennings

The Lady Wimborne Cottages (also known as the Canford Estate Cottages) are 111 cottages built by the Guest family of Canford Manor, between 1867 and 1904 to improve the living standards of workers on the estate.

They are named after Cornelia Guest, Baroness Wimborne who, as wife of Ivor Bertie Guest, 1st Baron Wimborne, oversaw the construction of the majority of the estate cottages.

Located within Dorset they span the breadth of the original Canford estate, clustered mostly in Canford Magna and Ashington, yet can also be further afield in Poole, Hamworthy, Lilliput and Longham, Ferndown. Being of significant historic importance, all the cottages are either Grade II Listed or Locally Listed.

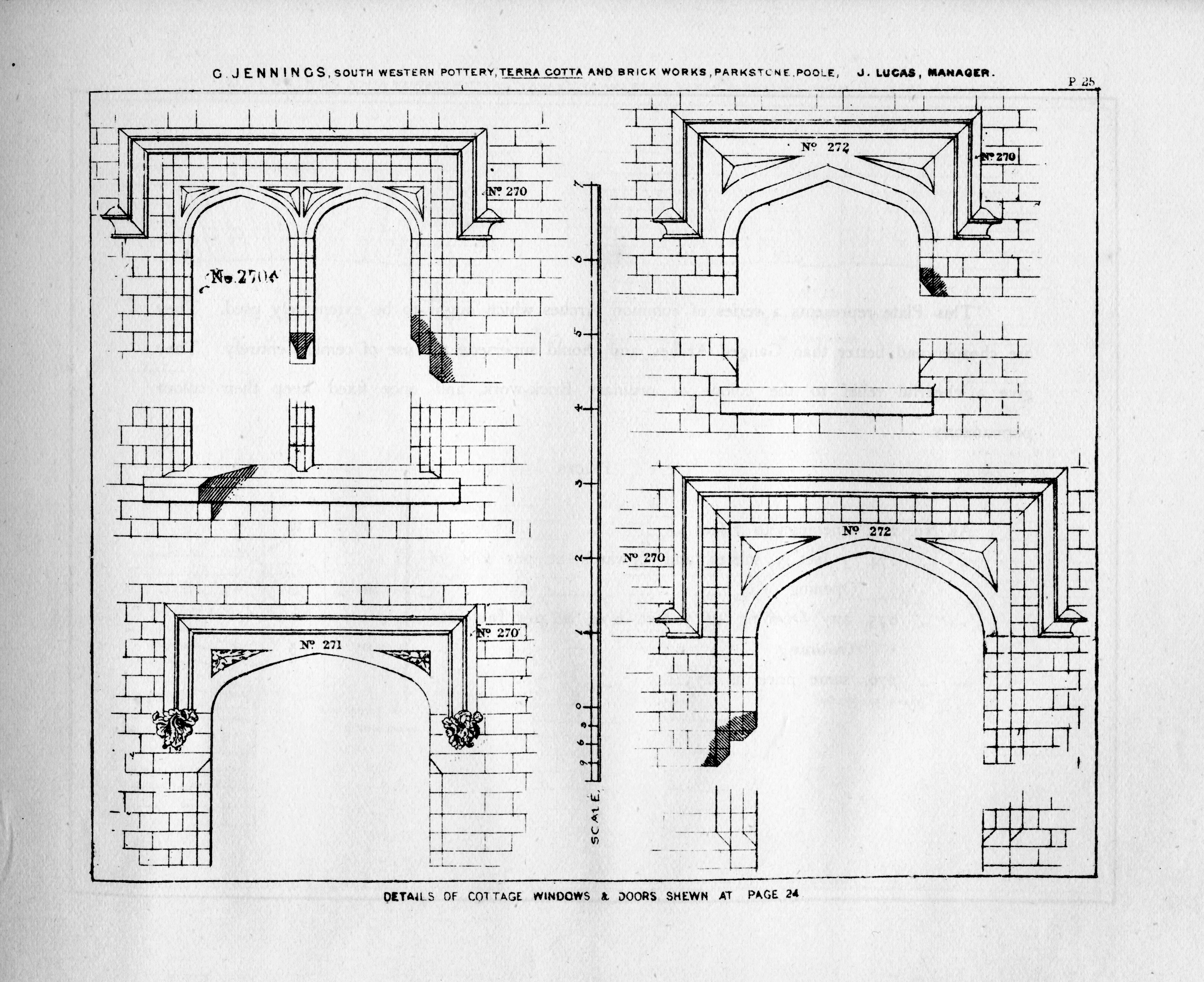
Engravings of details for windows and doorways of Lady Wimborne Cottages, G. Jennings, Poole

== Guest family and origin ==
In 1846, the Canford Manor Estate, Dorset was purchased by John Josiah Guest, the Welsh iron magnate, and his wife Lady Charlotte Guest, for £335,000 as a country retreat. Over time the family spent increasing amounts of time in Dorset, although Guest continued his role as sole manager of the Dowlais Ironworks Company, which had established his wealth.

In 1847 the Manor was partly remodelled by the Guests who employed celebrated architect Charles Barry, architect of the Houses of Parliament, and between 1848 and 1853 the process of alteration continued under his son Charles Barry Junior. The work of Charles Barry Sr. can be seen elsewhere on the estate, through the design of Bridge 77, the 'Lady Wimborne Bridge.'

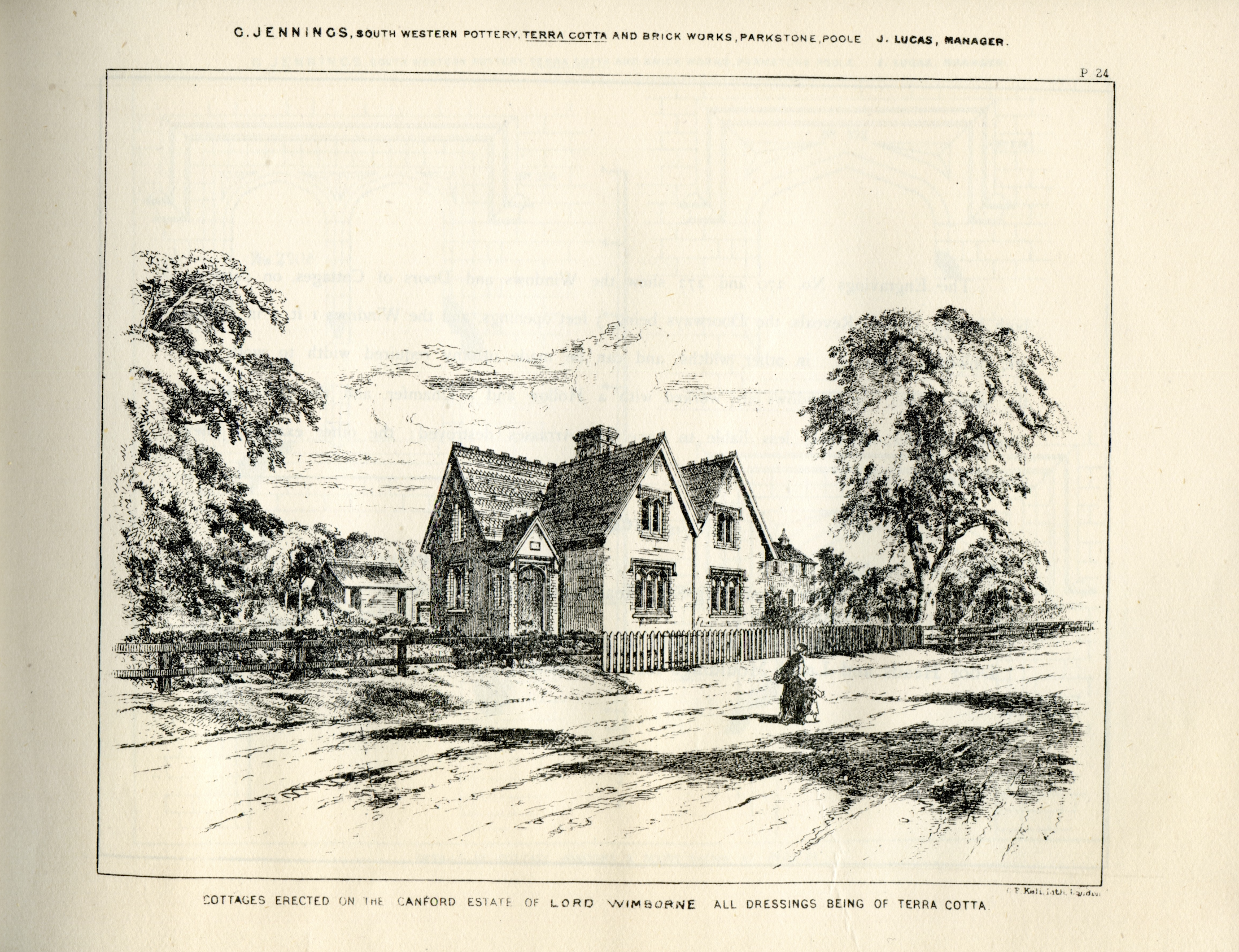
George Jennings engravings of the cottages, South Western Pottery

Whether or not Barry was the architect of the Lady Wimborne cottages, still remains uncertain, yet we can be certain that his son Charles Barry Jr. in partnership with Robert Banks, did design the armorial crests that adorn the cottages, and is believed to have drafted the designs for the cottages himself. George Jennings, however adapted the designs for local usage. He was responsible for producing the designs for the lancet windows and door surrounds, which were produced in Parkstone.

== Architectural features ==
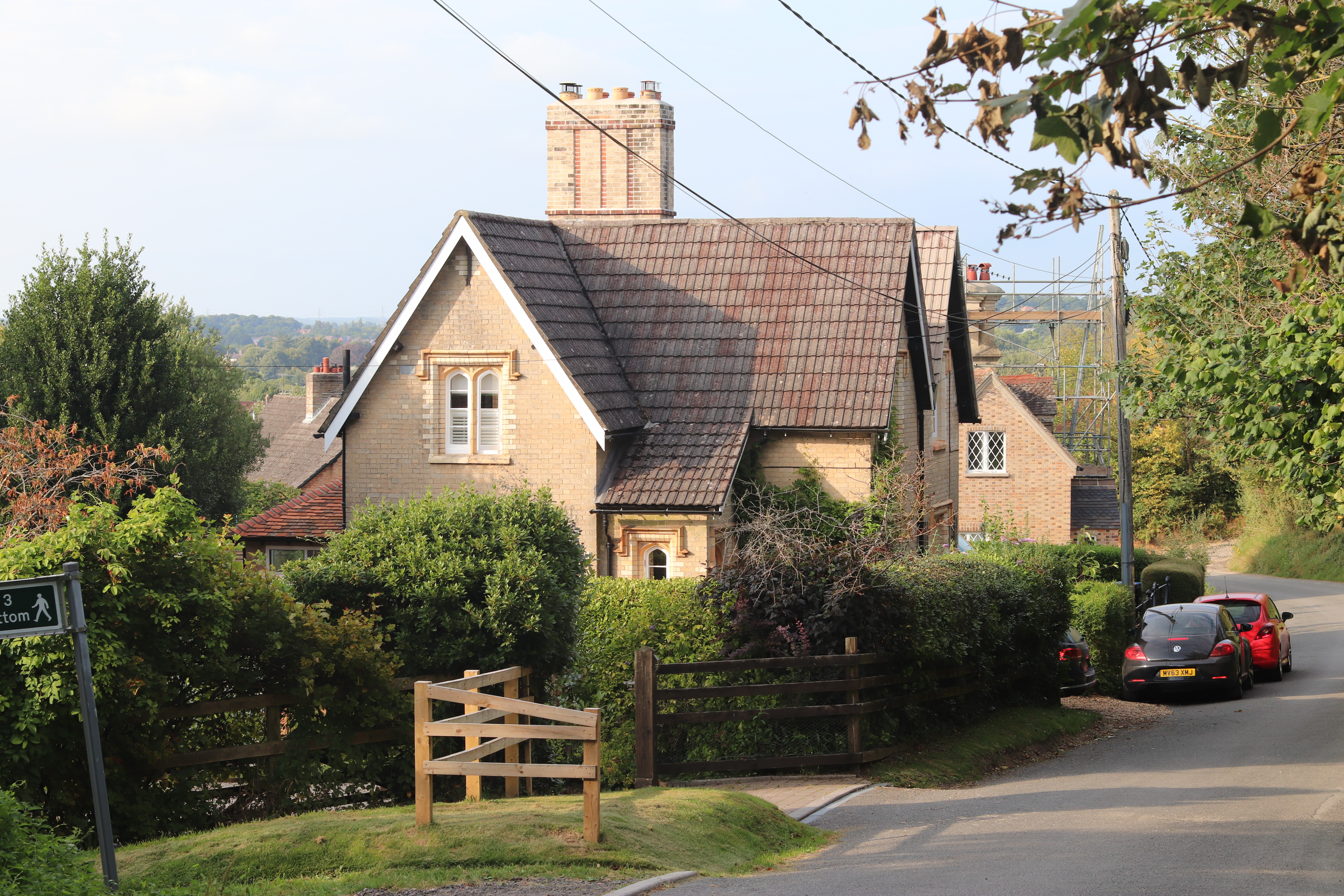
Semi-detached Lady Wimborne Cottages, Ashington

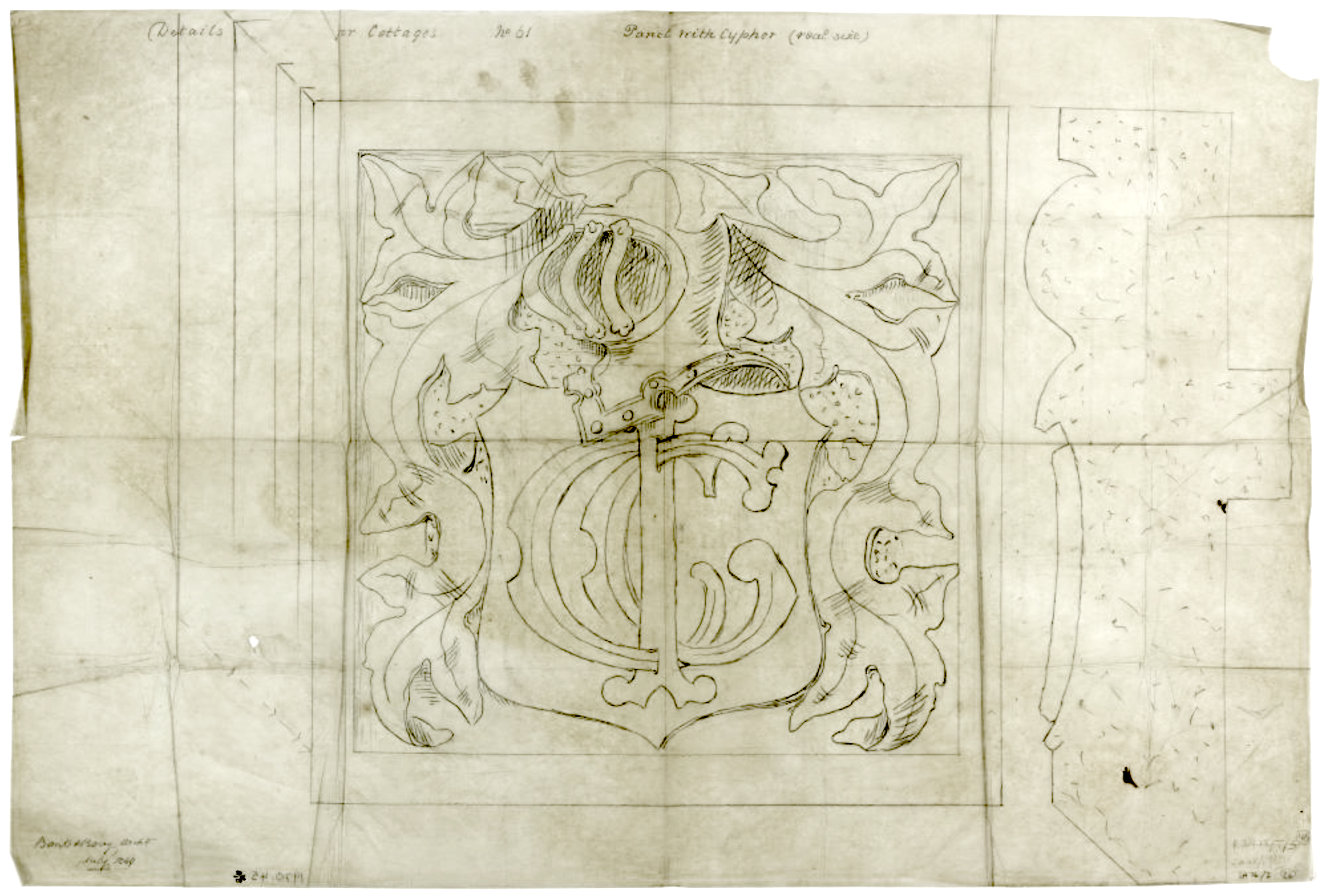
Cypher drawing by Charles Barry Jr. for the Lady Wimborne Cottages

The cottages fenestration is mostly of the perpendicular gothic style, with rectangular openings inset with deeply recessed lancet windows. These windows were dressed with stone arches, sills, mullions and drip strip mouldings. These ornate features were constructed, not from stone, but from moulded terracotta bricks, made locally at George Jennings' South Western Pottery factory in Parkstone.

The mock arrow slits that feature in the gables of the cottages, may appear purely decorative, yet also served a role in aiding ventilation within.

Every Lady Wimborne cottage, regardless of the variation in style, can be identified as one of the estate cottages by the presence of the armorial panel. This decorative cypher, found on the gable, was designed by Charles Barry Jr. and bears the coat of arms of the Guest family and features the date it was built. A terracotta plaque can also be found usually above the doorways, featuring a number denoting the chronological order of its construction.

These panels and the cottages themselves are described derisively by Sir Frederic Treves in the 1906 publication, Highways and Byways in Dorset. "Built according to a contract pattern. The houses, all alike, are all stamped with the same effusive coat of arms, as are the sheets of a quire of much emblazoned notepaper."

== Variation between cottages ==
The style of the cottages developed over time before reaching a uniform style. Various patterns for the cottages were trialed on the outskirts of the estate between 1867 and 1870, which adopted the 'Polite Tudor' style, inspired by a series of articles published in a 1948 edition of The Illustrated London News, suggesting a suitable style for the cottages of agricultural workers.

From 1870 cottages began to be built according to a more similar design, featuring brick and ornate terracotta lancet windows. This was known as the De Ville style and from 1870 onwards all the cottages were built in this way. The first of this type, which can be found in West Howe, featured bay windows, yet these were not used in subsequent cottages.

These De Ville style cottages were designed either as terraced housing of 4 or 5 houses, or as semi-detached cottages, with the uniform semi-detached variant being the only variant built from 1873 onwards.

With the terraced cottages in Canford Magna, the front door opened into the living-room and behind was an incredibly narrow strip of kitchen, with stairs to small bedrooms, one of which is the landing. A door in the passage-kitchen opened onto a communal tiled yard with taps for water supply. The undivided gardens run up to a little range of lavatories.

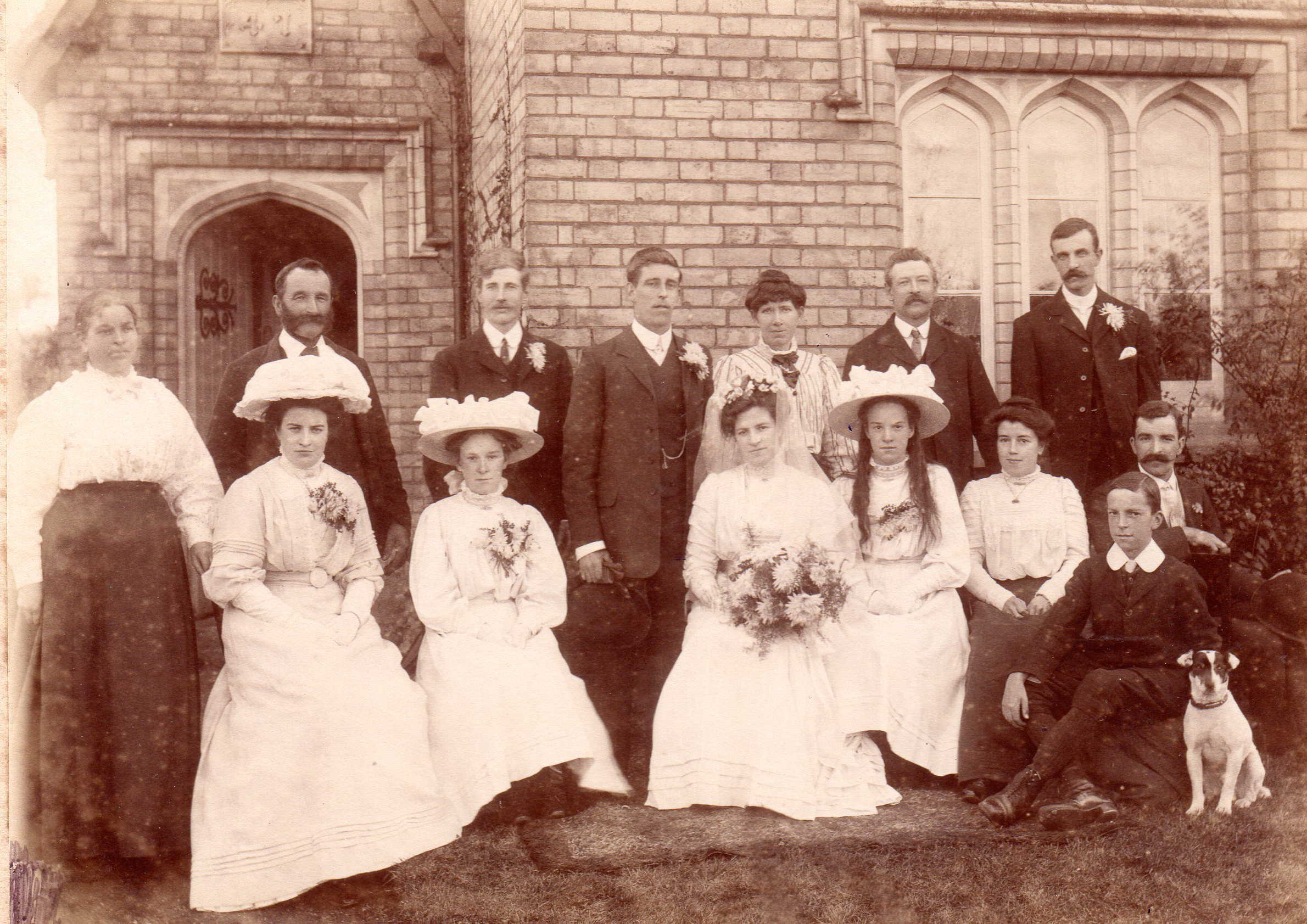
Edwardian family stood outside 8 Oakley Lane, A semi-detached Lady Wimborne Cottage of the later style, Canford Magna

The later semi-detached cottages, however, had a hallway where the staircase was located and where the two ground floor room should be accessed. Off the hall was a living room with a fireplace, and a scullery containing: a sink, a copper (for water heating), a fireplace (for cooking) and an adjoining pantry. Upstairs there were three bedrooms, two of which had fireplaces.

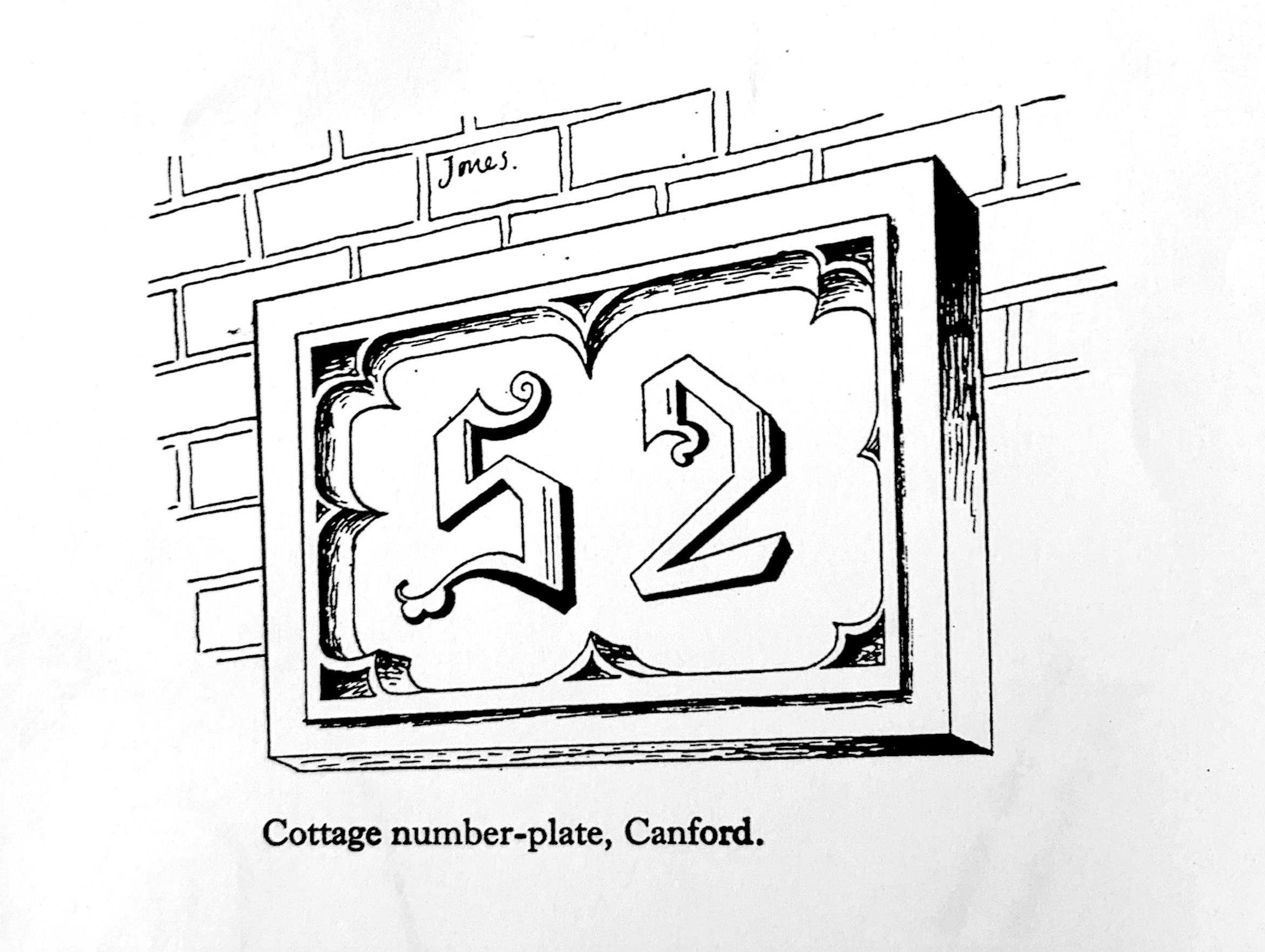
Terracotta number plate manufactured by George Jennings for the Lady Wimborne Cottages. Illustration by Barbara Jones

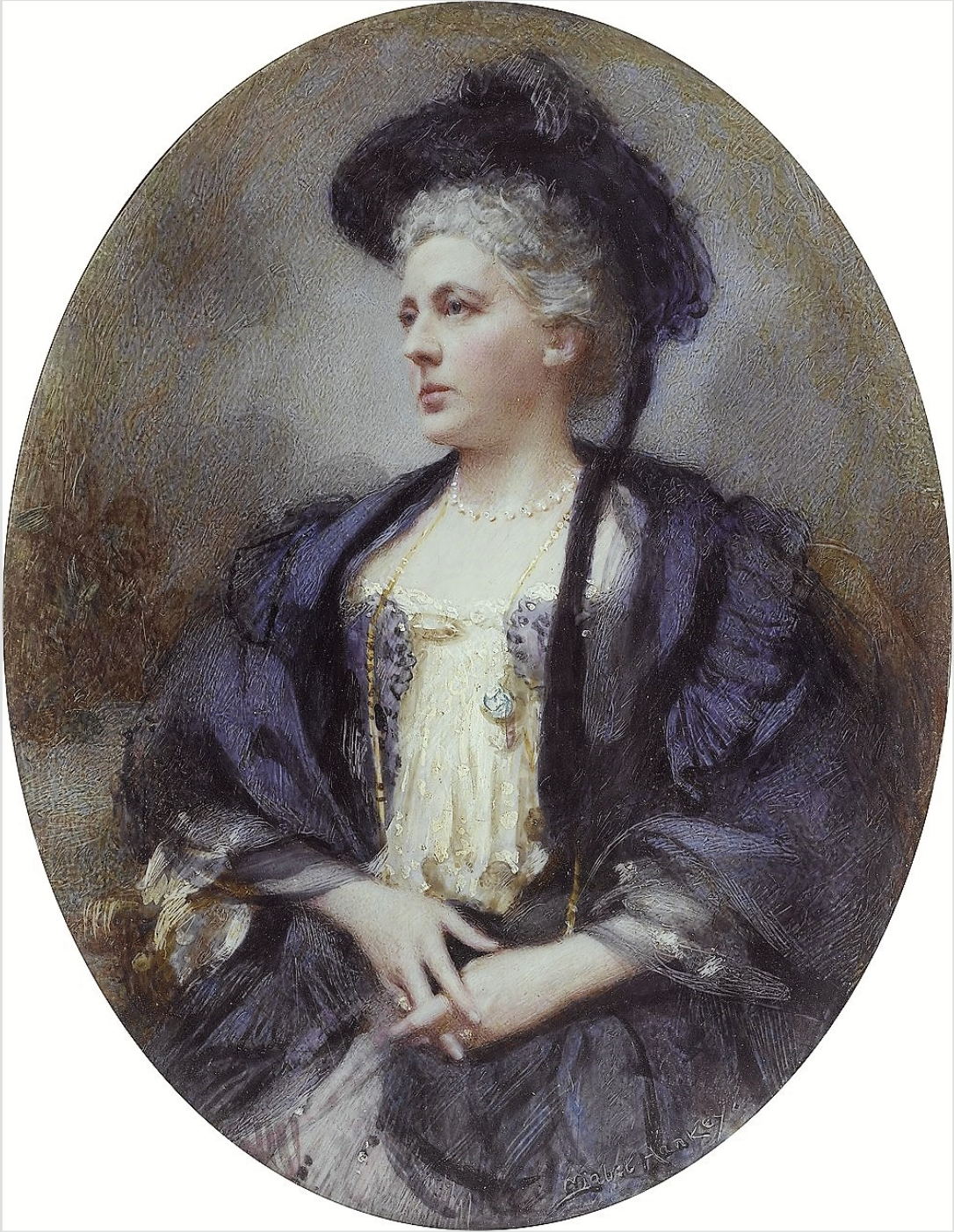
Lady Wimborne, Cornelia Henrietta Maria Guest, (1847–1927) after whom the cottages are named

== Tenant terms ==
Each of the semi-detached cottages was set in a quarter of an acre of land to promote self-sufficiency. To the rear of the properties was a small building divided across the boundary, which served as a pig sty and housed a privy.

Lady Wimborne made frequent inspections of the properties accompanied by the bailiff. Prizes were awarded for the best kept gardens and allotment and plants were provided by the estate to encourage tenants to maintain their gardens.

The estate worker tenants were charged a mere 1 shilling per week rent for the cottages, further emphasising the philanthropy of the Guests. A 1900 study conducted by Seebohm Rowntree found that the average rent for a private three-bed house was five shillings.

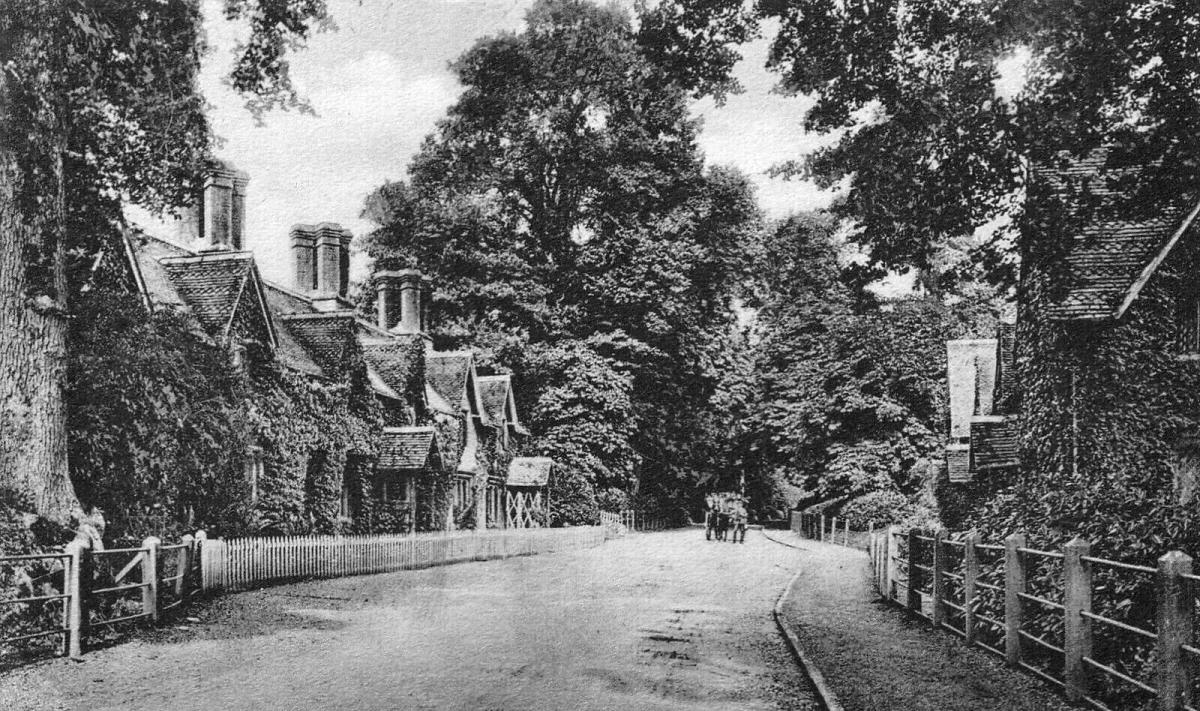
Terraced Lady Wimborne Cottages, (no. 45-49) built 1870

No colour wash was allowed on the interior walls of the houses, only lime, for which an allowance of 1/- (5p) was allocated.
