= George Jennings =

English sanitary engineer; inventor of public toilets

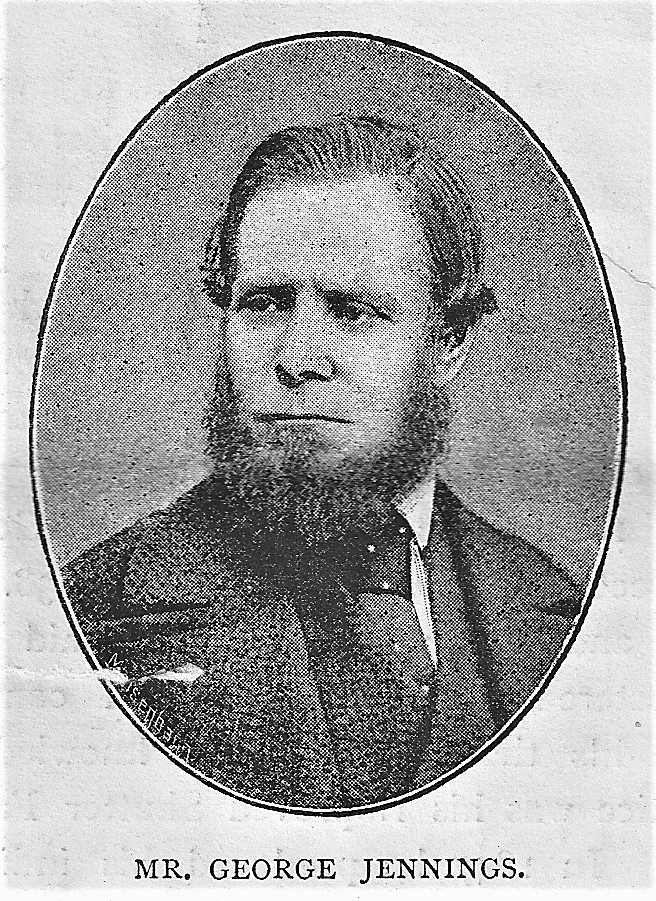
- Born: Josiah George Jennings; 10 November 1810; Eling, Hampshire, England
- Died: 17 April 1882 (aged 71); Clapham, London, England
- Burial place: West Norwood Cemetery
- Occupation: Engineer
- Spouse: Mary Ann Gill Sophia Budd

George Jennings (10 November 1810 – 17 April 1882) was an English sanitary engineer and plumber who invented the first public flush toilets. These were first showcased at the Great Exhibition in 1851, and such was the popularity of his invention the first public toilets opened in 1852 and were known as ‘Public Waiting Rooms'.

Josiah George Jennings was born on 10 November 1810 in Eling, at the edge of the New Forest in Hampshire. He was the eldest of seven children of Jonas Joseph Jennings and Mary Dimmock. He was educated at the local school run by his uncle-in-law Joshua Withers. At 14, after his father's death he was apprenticed to his grandfather's glass and lead merchandising business, before moving to his uncle John Jennings's plumbing business at Southwick, Southampton. In 1831 he became a plumber with Messrs. Lancelot Burton of Newcastle Street, London where his father had been a foreman before him.

He married twice, having four children by his first wife, Mary Ann Gill, who died in 1844, aged 31. He remarried Sophia Budd (aged 16) some 14 years later, and had 11 children with her. One of these was Mabel Jennings, who married the English organist and composer Basil Harwood. In 1838, Jennings set up his own business in Paris Street, Lambeth (later moving to Great Charlotte Street, Blackfriars), when he received an inheritance from his grandmother, Anne Jennings.

Jennings specialised in designing toilets that were "as perfect a sanitary closet as can be made". However, he also excelled in public sanitation projects such as the design of the underground 'public convenience'. The entrances to these were elaborate metal railings and arches lit by lamps, with interiors built of slate and later, of ceramic tiles. A beautiful example of a public convenience from a period a little after Jennings's death is the Gentleman's Convenience at Wesley's Chapel, City Road, London, built in 1891, by Thomas Crapper, in a manner Jennings would have liked. Jennings's own most famous installation was for the Great Exhibition in the Retiring Rooms of The Crystal Palace but does not survive.

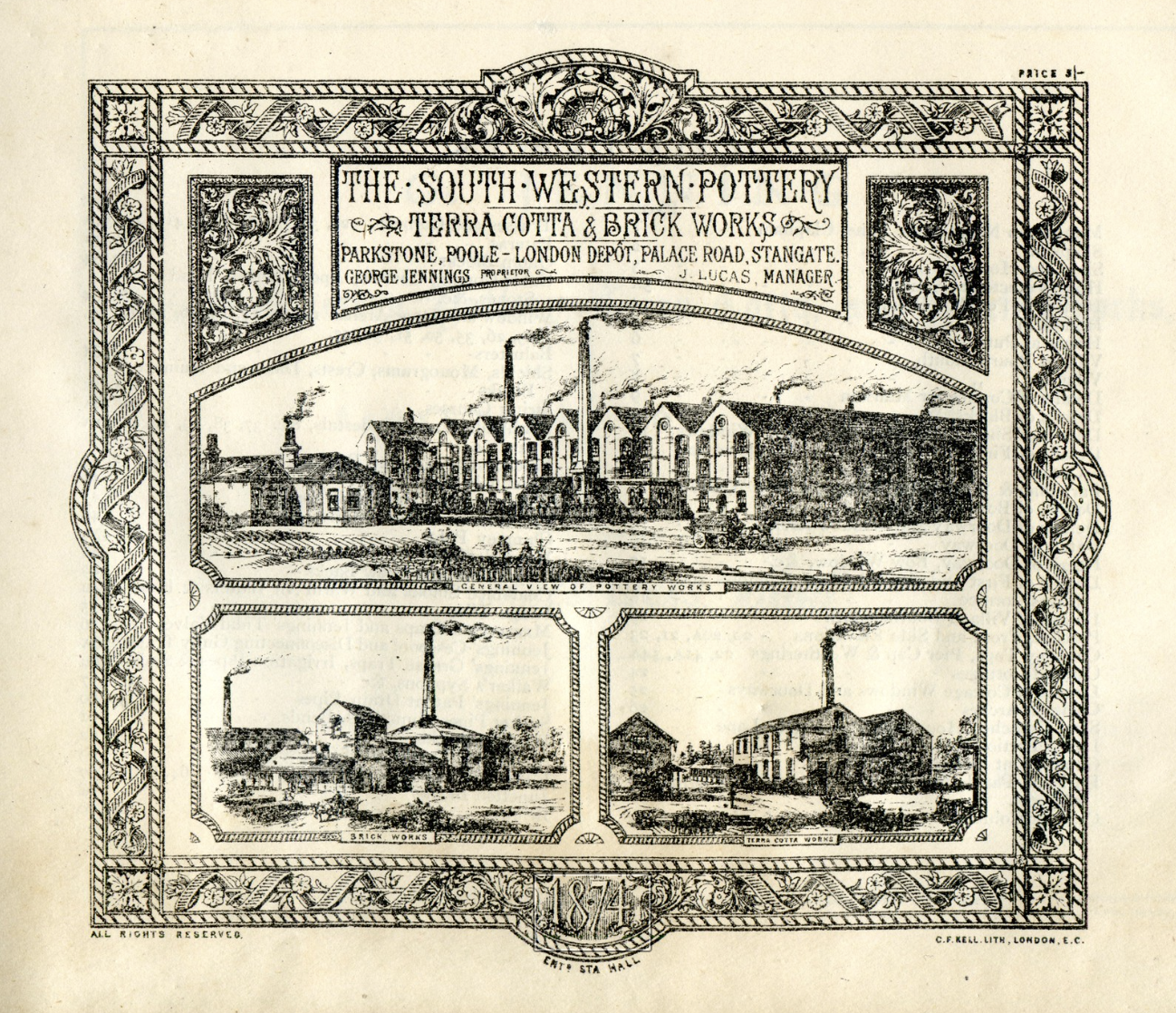
Bookplate from his catalogue 'The South Western Pottery, Terracotta and Brick Works'

== Chronology of achievements ==
=== 1847 ===
Prince Albert presented George Jennings with the Medal of the Society of Arts for his 'indiarubber tube taps and tube' for water supply. By now he was prospering and had also established George Jennings South Western Pottery at Parkstone Pottery in Dorset, manufacturing water closets, salt-glaze drainage, sanitary pipes and architectural details, such as terracotta moulding for Lady Wimborne Cottages of the Canford estate. Parkstone was the site of several industrial undertakings, the largest being George Jennings South Western Pottery, which had its own steam locomotive, that ran on a private branch line from Parkstone Station.

=== 1851 ===
At the Great Exhibition at Hyde Park, London held from 1 May to 15 October 1851, George Jennings installed his Monkey Closets in the Retiring Rooms of The Crystal Palace. These were the first public toilets, and they caused great excitement. During the exhibition, 827,280 visitors paid one penny to use them; for the penny they got a clean seat, a towel, a comb and a shoe shine. "To spend a penny" became a euphemism for going to the toilet.

When the exhibition finished and moved to Sydenham, the toilets were to be closed down. However, Jennings persuaded the organisers to keep them open, and the toilet went on to earn over £1,000 a year. Jennings said that 'the civilisation of a people can be measured by their domestic and sanitary appliances' whilst the objectors had stated that 'visitors are not coming to the Exhibition merely to wash'!

(Thomas Crapper, often mistakenly credited with inventing the flush toilet, was only 14 years old at this point.)

=== 1852 ===
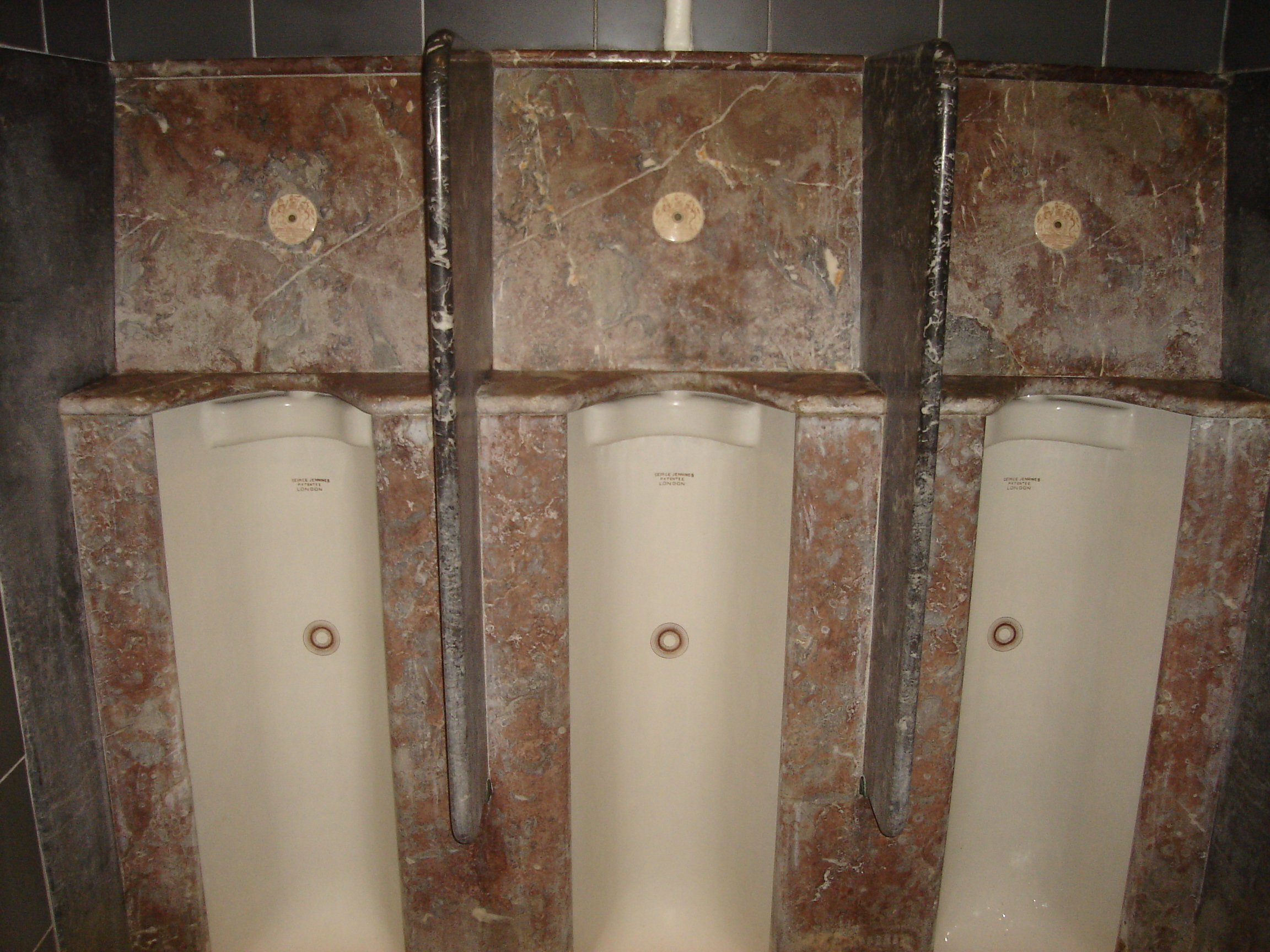
Jennings's urinals at the Windermere hotel

Patent dated 23 August 1852. JOSIAH GEORGE JENNINGS, of Great Charlotte – street, Blackfriars-road, brass founder. For improvements in water-closets, in traps and valves, and in pumps.

1. An improved construction of water-closet, in which the pan and trap are constructed in the same piece, and so formed that there shall always be a certain quantity of water retained in the pan itself, in addition to that in the trap which forms the water-joint.
2. An improved construction of valve for water-closets and other uses, and several arrangements of valves and other apparatus for like purposes. The novelty of the valve consists in its spindle being prolonged downwards, so as to be capable of being acted on by a lever which opens and closes it, and thus admits water without (in the case of water-closets) the use of wires, &c. The other arrangements include a similar valve, but provided with a waste-pipe, and an arrangement of the same with a ball- cock for governing the supply of water to water-closets and their cisterns; also an improved stand-pipe, and a sluice-valve for steam and fluids, the novelty of which consists in the manner of fitting and fixing the facings against which the slide works.
3. An improved trap for drains, &c., which is merely the ordinary bell-trap reversed.
4. An improved construction of pump for lifting and forcing, in which the use of a branch-pipe and stuffing-box, as ordinarily employed, is dispensed with; the branch in which the handle works being provided with a vulcanised India-rubber tube surrounding the handle at the joint, so as to prevent leakage.
5. An improved mode of constructing pump-barrels, by casting the inferior metal of which they are composed around a brass tube, which acts as a lining to the barrel, and obviates the necessity of burning or boring the interior.

=== 1854 ===
The opening of the first underground convenience at the Royal Exchange designed by George Jennings.

- The date is disputed
- Reference suggesting 1851 proposal, 1856 drawings, and apparent acceptance for Crystal Palace; much later date of 1884 for underground convenience opposite Royal Exchange.

=== 1855 ===
During the Crimean War, Jennings headed the sanitary commission sent out by the British Government to improve the condition at Selimiye Barracks hospital at Scutari, Sebastopol at the request of Florence Nightingale.

=== 1860–1870 ===
During the 1860s, Jennings was building up an export business. Sometime between 1866 and 1888, he supplied Khedive of Egypt, Tewfik Pasha with an elaborate mahogany shower cabinet. He also supplied the Empress Eugenie of France with a copper bath. He built a reputation and, in 1870, supplied the water closet with his patented flushing mechanism in Lord Bute's Victorian bathroom in the Bute Tower at Cardiff Castle designed by architect William Burges.

=== 1872 ===
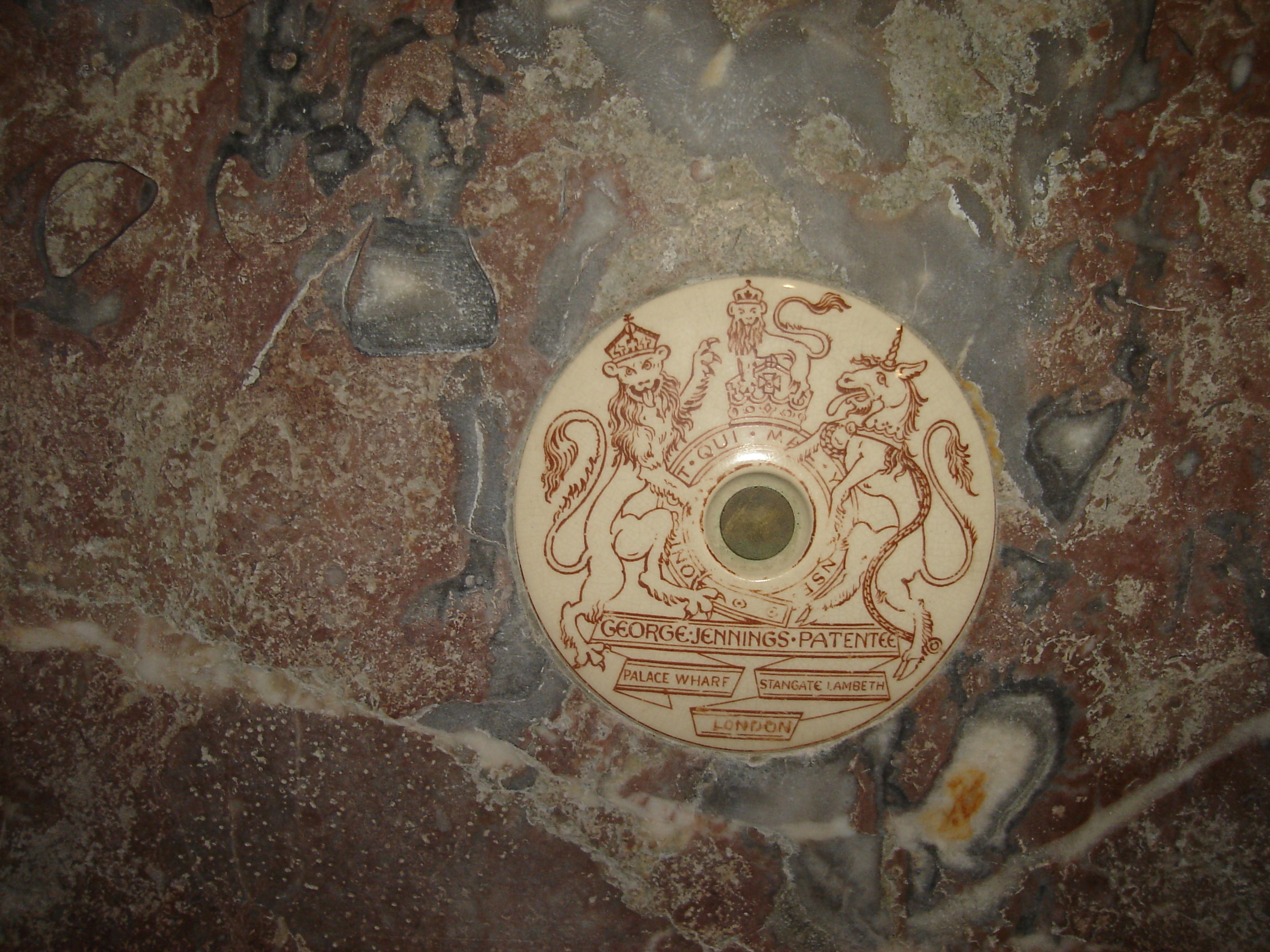
George Jennings trademark

George Jennings supervised the public facilities at the thanksgiving service for the Prince of Wales at St Paul's Cathedral to celebrate his recovery from typhoid. He had been a favourite of the late Prince Consort which was recorded by The Sanitary Record: 'The Prince Consort greatly encouraged this indefatigable Engineer. In sanitary science he was avant coureur in his day and generation, and was among the first Engineers to practically carry out the theories of the wise men of the time. 'Sanitas sanitatum' was Mr Jennings's motto before Disraeli adopted it as his political maxim (Sanitas sanitatum, omnia sanitas)... and he implored a shocked city of London to accept his public lavatories free, on the condition that the... attendants whom he furnished were allowed to make a small charge for the use of the closets and towels.'

=== 1882 ===
George Jennings died on 17 April 1882, aged 72. The South London Press reported the accident as follows:

'It is with feelings of regret, which will be joined in by all who knew him, that we have this week to record the death of Mr George Jennings of Ferndale, Nightingale Lane, Clapham, universally known as the celebrated engineer of Palace Wharf, Lambeth. Mr Jennings' death occurred under the following painful circumstances: On Thursday evening, according to his usual custom, he, together with his son George, drove home in his gig. The horse, of a very restive character and hard in the mouth, whilst crossing over the Albert Bridge, shied and threw Mr Jennings and his son against a dust cart. Mr Jennings Jnr. escaped with only a shaking, but Mr Jennings' collar bone was fractured. He was conveyed home and attended by Dr Edmonds and two other physicians. His recovery from the injuries proceeded favourably up until Sunday, when against his doctors' order, he would get up. On Sunday night a relapse and congestion of the lungs set in, and he expired on Monday evening, about 6 o'clock. He was 72 years of age.'

He was buried on 23 April at West Norwood Cemetery (grave 19,077 square 34) and in his will left a fortune of £76,721/7/6d.

== After his death ==
The family firm continued until 1967 and by 1895 their catalogue listed at least 36 towns where public conveniences had been installed. Paris, Florence, Berlin, Madrid, and Sydney as well as South America and the Far East. They provided water closets to at least 30 railway companies in Britain, and other railways in America, Argentina, Mexico and South Africa. Their hard-bound catalogues were thick books that show a huge variety of water closets, urinals, basins, baths, Turkish baths, saunas, among many others.

== Posthumous awards ==
At the International Health Exhibition in London in 1884, The Gold Medal was awarded for the Jennings Pedestal Vase. In a test, its 2-gallon flush washed down ten apples of average diameter 1 ¼ inches, 1 flat sponge about 4 ½ inches in diameter, plumber's smudge coated over the pan, and 4 pieces of paper adhering closely to the soiled surface.

Jennings also posthumously won for his firm, the Grand Prix at Paris in 1900, for his siphonic pan which had been a major development in lavatory design.

== Models ==
- Jennings's Patent Tilt-up & Lipped Lavatory
- Jennings and Lovegroove's Patent Plunger-Closet (1858)
