= Charles Barry Jr. =

English architect

Charles Barry Jr. RIBA
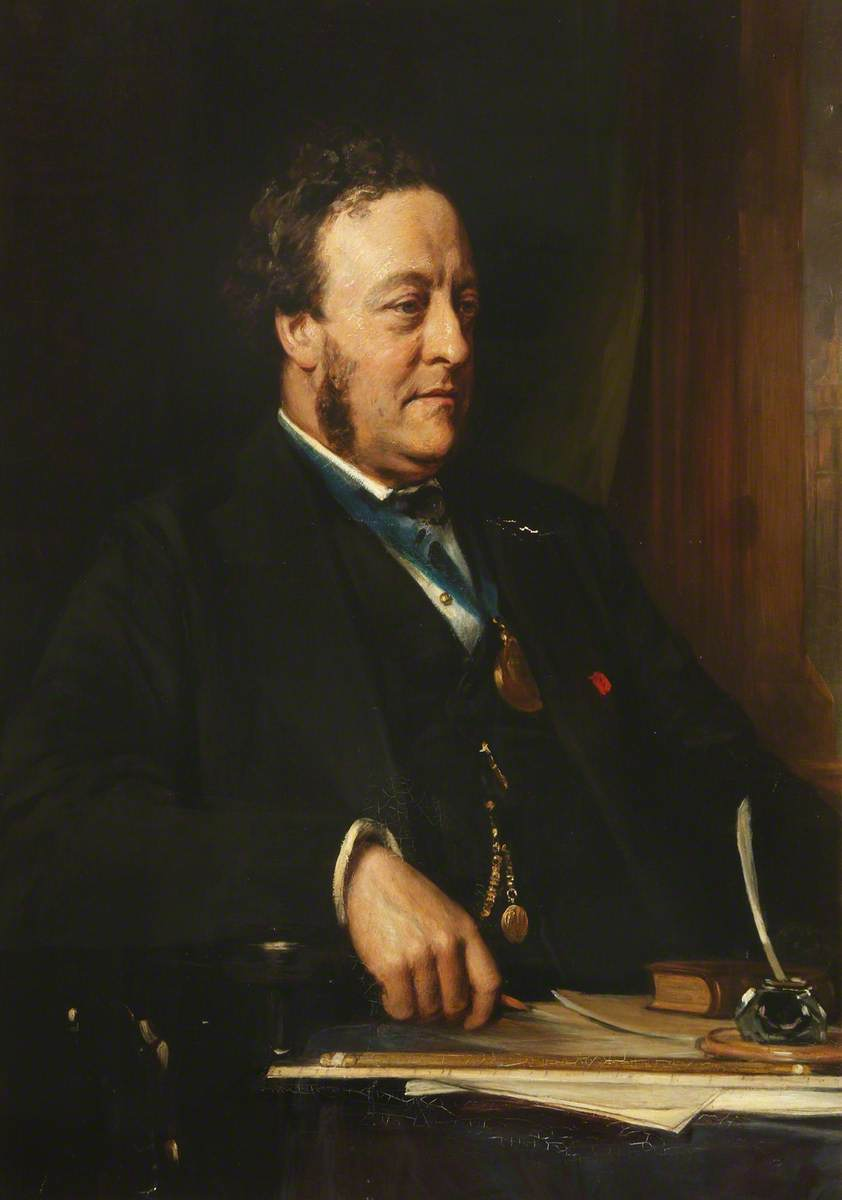
- Portrait of Barry in 1880
- Born: 21 September 1823; Holborn, Middlesex, England
- Died: 2 June 1900 (aged 77); Worthing, West Sussex, England
- Occupation: Architect
- Known for: Projects in Dulwich, London
- Children: Lt. Col. Arthur John Barry; Charles Edward Barry
- Parents: Sir Charles Barry (father); Sarah Rowsell (mother)
- Awards: Royal Gold Medal

Charles Barry Jr. (21 September 1823 – 2 June 1900) was an English architect known for designing public and private buildings in London and East Anglia. He was the eldest son of Sir Charles Barry, the architect of the Houses of Parliament, and the older brother of fellow architect Edward Middleton Barry. Barry Jr. is best remembered for his work in the south London suburb of Dulwich, and for his collaborations with Robert Richardson Banks (1812–1872) and his brother Edward on several significant projects.

== Projects ==
Charles Sr. had been architect and surveyor to the College of God’s Gift, designing the Old Grammar School (an 1842 establishment for the education of poor boys from Dulwich and Camberwell), among other buildings. Charles Jr. then succeeded his father in the role. He designed the New College (1866–70) – a building of red brick and white stone, designed in a hybrid of Palladian and Gothic styles.

His other projects include:

- The Cliff Town Estate, Southend, Essex (with Banks)
- Bylaugh Hall, Norfolk (1849–1852, with Banks)
- Lady Wimborne Estate Cottages, Canford Magna, Ashington, and Poole, Dorset, (1849, with Banks)
- The Pump House in the Italian Gardens, Hyde Park/Kensington Gardens, (1860, with Banks)
- St Saviour's Church, Harome (1861–1862)
- The Crystal Palace (High Level) railway station (1863–1865, demolished 1961) and the surviving Crystal Palace Subway
- The forecourt of Burlington House (home of the Royal Academy), in Piccadilly, including the apartments of the Geological Society of London, Linnean Society of London, Royal Astronomical Society, Royal Society of Chemistry, and Society of Antiquaries of London (1869–73, with Banks).
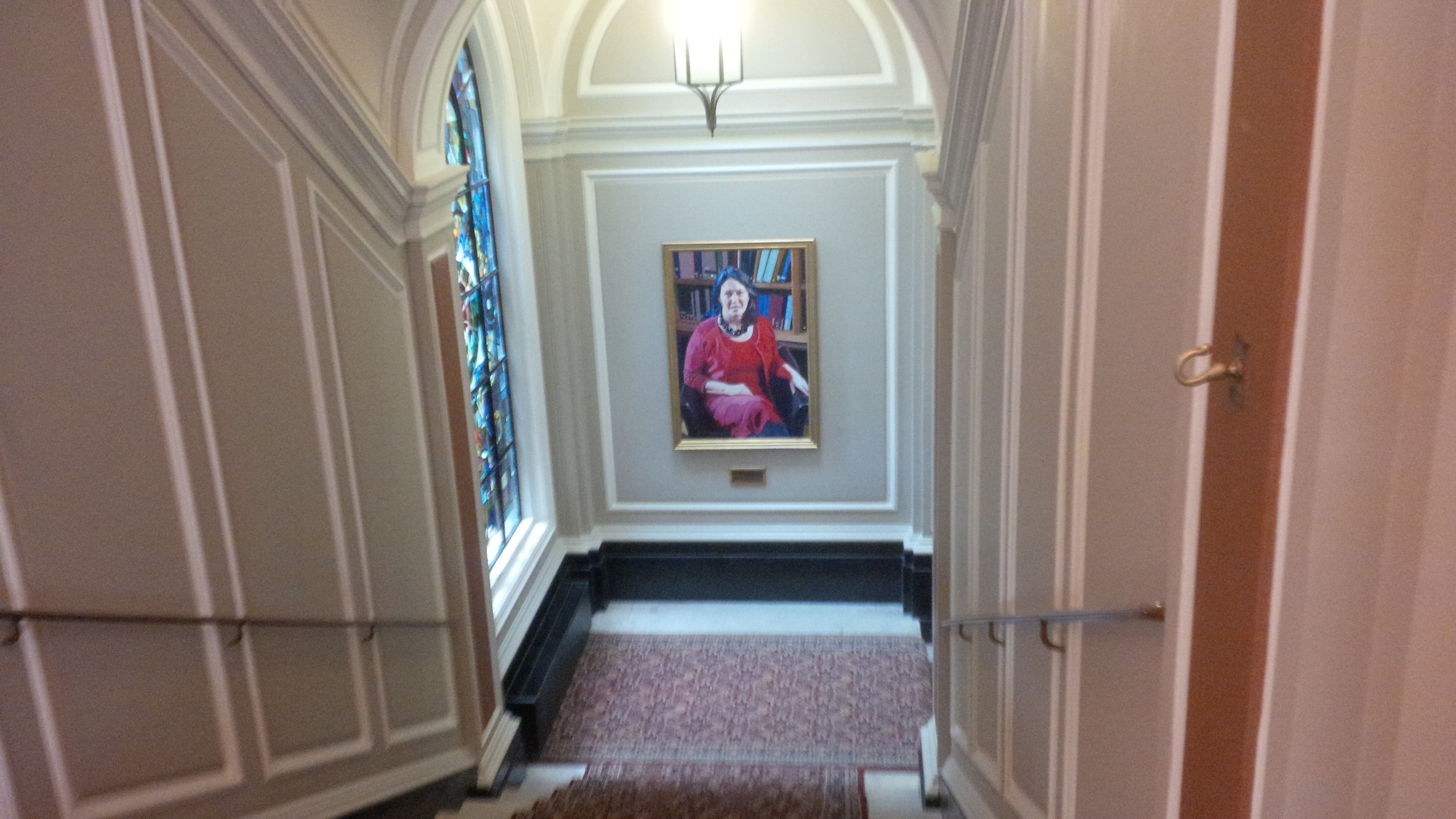
  The staircase at the Royal Society of Chemistry, Burlington House, designed in a Soansian style by the partnership of Robert Richardson Banks and Charles Barry Jr.
  St Stephen's Church, south Dulwich (1867–75)
- Stevenstone House, Devon (1868–72)
- Mausoleum of Wynn Ellis, Whitstable (1872)
- All Saints Church, Whitstable, rebuilding (1875–76)
- Clumber Park, Nottinghamshire, (1879)
- Chancel and pulpit of St Peter's Church, Kensington Park Road, London (1879)
- New chambers at Inner Temple, London (1879; with Edward)
- Great Eastern Hotel, Liverpool Street station, London (1884; the design was a collaboration with his brother Edward who died in 1880 before it was finished)
- Dulwich Park (1884)
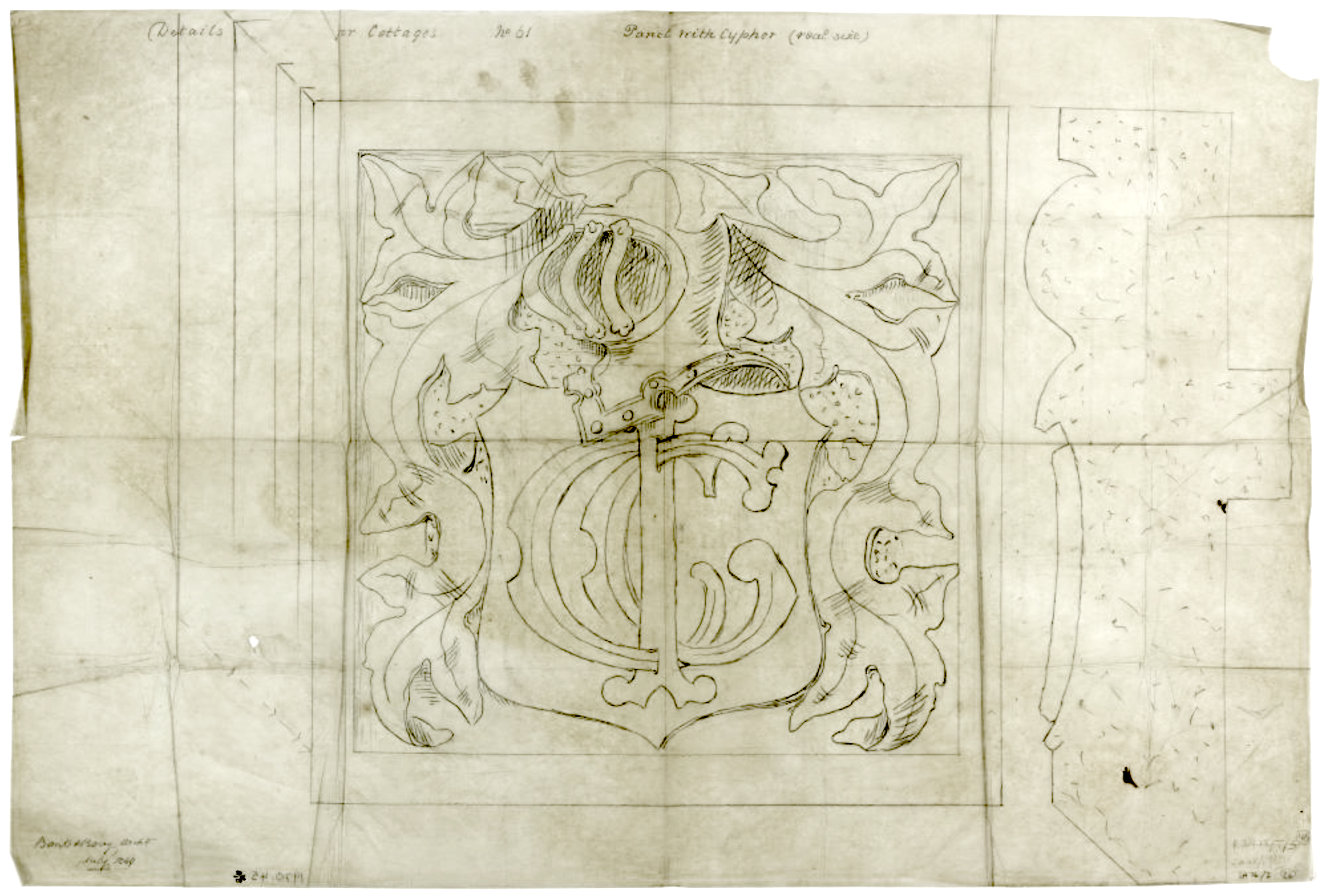
  Cypher drawing by Charles Barry Jr. for the Lady Wimborne Cottages

Charles Jr. was elected a Fellow of the Society of Antiquaries of London in 1876, and was a member of the Society's Council in 1878. He was President of the Royal Institute of British Architects from 1876–79. He was also awarded the prestigious RIBA Royal Gold Medal in 1877. His pupils included Sir Aston Webb (himself a later President of the RIBA and winner of the Royal Gold Medal).

== Family ==
He lived in a large villa "Lapsewood" in Sydenham Hill. His son was Lt Col Arthur John Barry CBE, TD, MICE (b. 21 November 1859), civil engineer and architect. A. J. Barry collaborated on major international engineering projects with his uncle, Charles Jr.'s brother John Wolfe-Barry, and Bradford Leslie and was the author of "Railway Expansion in China and the Influence of Foreign Powers in its Development" [London, 1910].
