= Bylaugh =

Civil parish in Norfolk, England

Coordinates: 52.729°N 1.012°E

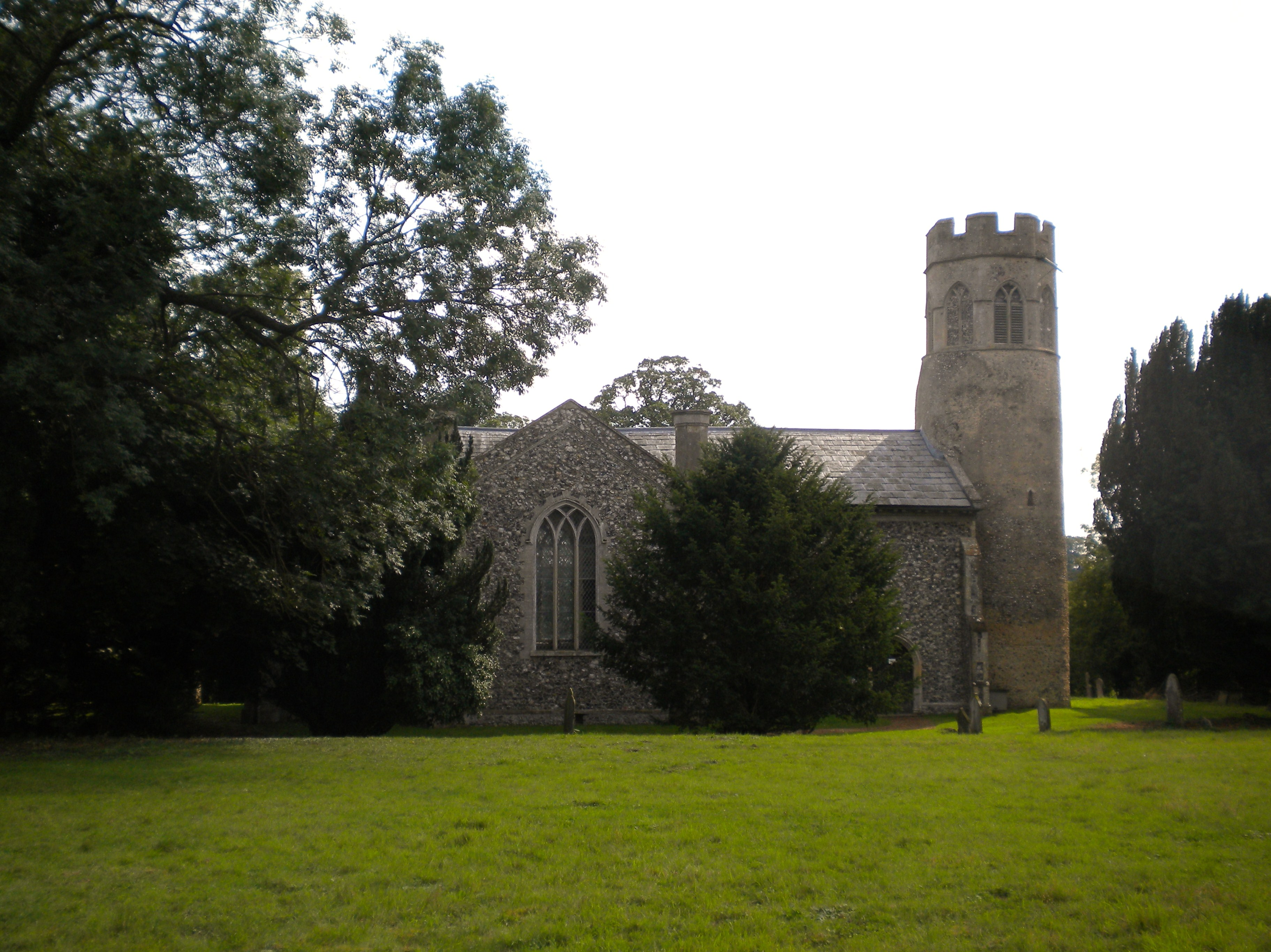
- Church of St. Mary the Virgin

- Location within Norfolk
- Area: 6.44 km^{2} (2.49 sq mi)
- Population: 65 (2001 census)
  - Density: 10/km^{2} (26/sq mi)
- OS grid reference: TG033189
- Civil parish: Bylaugh
- District: Breckland
- Shire county: Norfolk
- Region: East
- Country: England
- Sovereign state: United Kingdom
- Post town: DEREHAM
- Postcode district: NR20
- Dialling code: 01362
- Police: Norfolk
- Fire: Norfolk
- Ambulance: East of England
- UK Parliament: Mid Norfolk

Bylaugh /ˈbiːlə/ (Note: Rhymes with healer) is a civil parish in the English county of Norfolk. It is 4 1/2 miles (7.2 km) north-east of Dereham and 14 miles (23 km) north-west of Norwich. The parish is bounded to the south by the River Wensum and is sparsely populated, with no core settlement. The parish is dominated by Bylaugh Hall and its associated parkland.

== History ==
Bylaugh's name is of Anglo-Saxon origin, at in Domesday Book it is recorded as a settlement of 14 households in the hundred of Eynesford which was part of the estates of Alan of Brittany. The village appears to have been prosperous in to the 14th century, but had declined by the mid-15th century and was deserted at some point after this. No clear site for a deserted medieval village is known and there is no obvious reason for the decline of the settlement.

Bylaugh Hall, built of stone in 1851, and its estate are immediately north of the church. The hall was the headquarters of No. 100 Group RAF during World War II. Its flat (parapet) roof has "obelisks and heraldic beasts"; its gatepiers, farm-enclosing railings and gazebo are separately listed, as is a farmbuilding and clocktower. The house was stripped of its lead and interior fittings and abandoned in 1950. Restoration began in 2004.

== Church of St. Mary the Virgin ==
Bylaugh's parish church is dedicated to Saint Mary and is one of Norfolk's 124 remaining round-tower churches. It is Grade I listed and was significantly re-built in 1809 by Charles Barry at the expense of Sir John Lombe who is buried in the chancel.

A plaque on the west side of the church states: The chancel of this church rebuilt, the North and South transepts added. The tower buttress, windows, roof and battlements substantially rebuilt and repaired. And the interior of this church and chancel fitted up at the sole expense of Sir John Lombe Bart. – Patron
