= Bylaugh Hall =

Country house in Bylaugh, Norfolk, England

Coordinates: 52°43′41″N 1°0′53″E

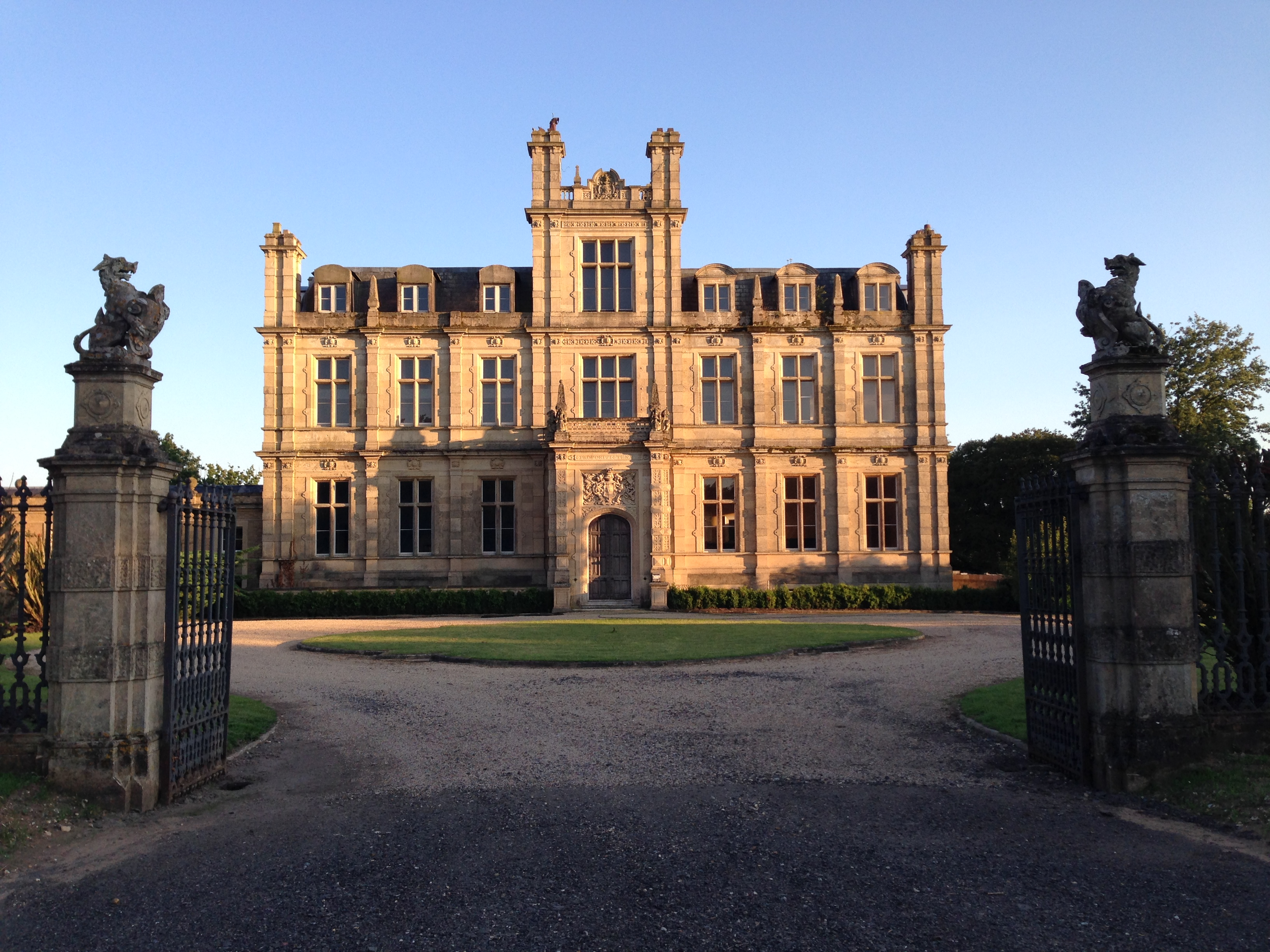
Bylaugh Hall, built 1852. Norfolk, England. Designed by Charles Barry Jr.

Bylaugh Hall, also known as Bylaugh Park, is a country house situated in the parish of Bylaugh in Norfolk, England.

== History ==
The estate was acquired by Sir John Lombe Bt (c. 1731 – 1817) in 1796. His fortune came from his family's silk throwing mill in Derbyshire; the details are uncertain. The unsubstantiated traditional story is that he won it from the former owner, Richard Lloyd, in a card game, after Lloyd's butler drugged his wine, but a more prosaic explanation seems likely.

Sir John did not marry and therefore had no legal immediate heirs. The terms of his will were complex. He left his estates to Edward Beevor (1771–1847), a barrister who was his half-brother (the product of an affair with a Norwich doctor's wife) who assumed the name of Lombe on his inheritance. Sir John ordered in his will that a new mansion was to be built on his Bylaugh estate, but Edward was reluctant to do this, and the terms of this will were not fulfilled until about 30 years later when his son, also called Edward Beevor, (1800–1852) inherited the property in 1847.

== The Beevor family ==
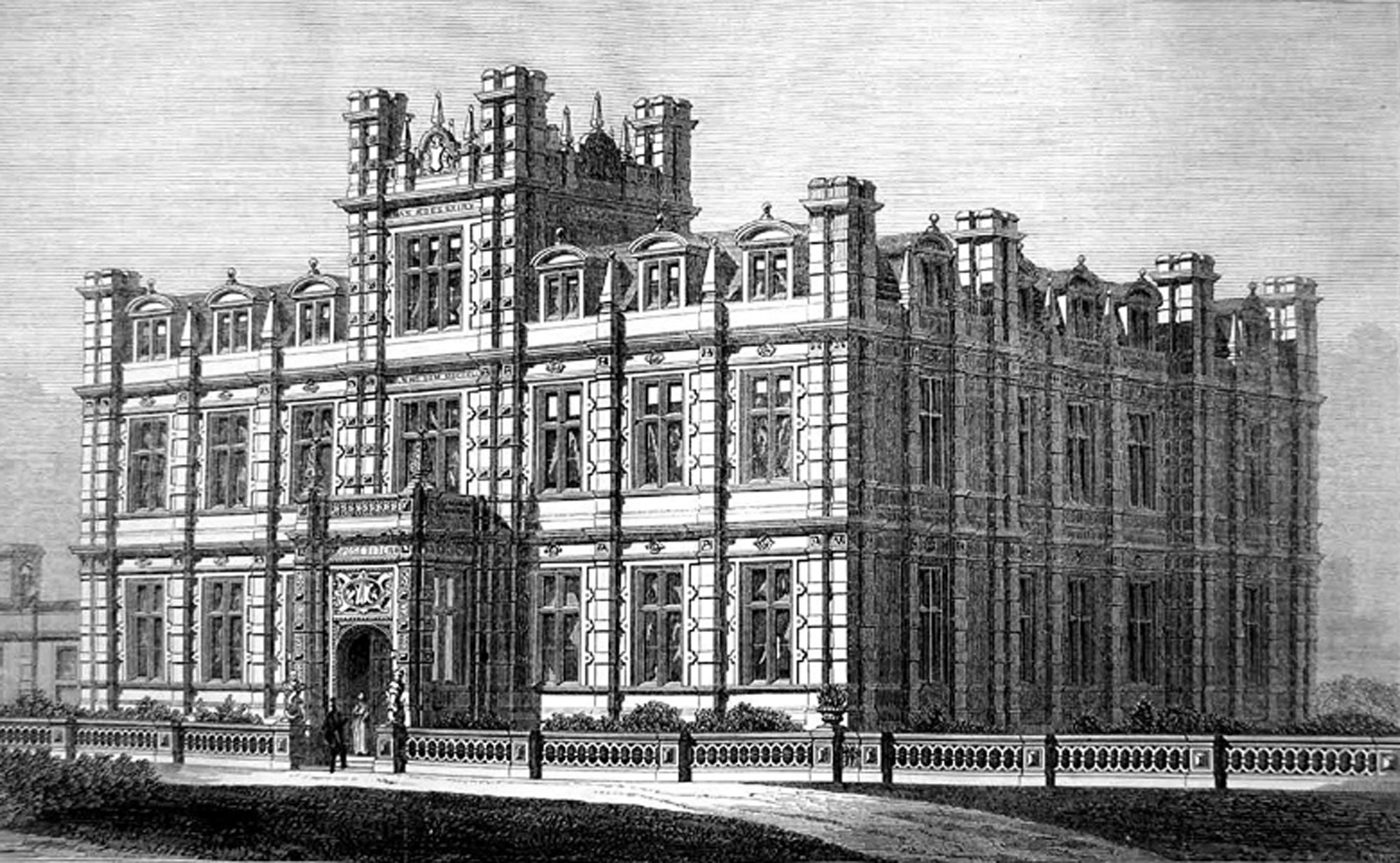
Bylaugh Hall 1852 when it was built

Edward Beevor, who built Bylaugh Hall, also assumed the name of Lombe. He was born in 1800 in Norwich. In 1826 he became an MP for Arundel. In 1831 he married Marie Rozer de St. Julien, who was French. The couple had no children and spent most of their lives travelling abroad. In 1849, after a long delay, the Court of Chancery intervened, and ordered the use of the trust funds for their appointed purpose, and the architects Charles Barry, Jr. and Robert Richardson Banks were at length commissioned to design a suitable house. William Andrews Nesfield advised on the position of the house, and was responsible for laying out the grounds and gardens. The clock tower and surrounding buildings are vaguely reminiscent of the new Houses of Parliament which were designed by Sir Charles Barry, Sr. Along with the Houses of Parliament, it was amongst the first buildings ever to employ steel girders in the supporting structure. The exterior stonework, including the balustrades and the terrace walling, are of Magnesian Limestone. At that time the estate was the third largest in Norfolk, containing over 19,000 acres (77 km^{2}).

Bylaugh Hall was completed in 1852, but Edward had died in the same year in Florence before its completion. It was inherited by his uncle Charles Beevor (1776–1860) who assumed the name of Lombe in accordance with Sir John Lombe's will. He was the first resident of Bylaugh Hall.

Charles died in 1860 and was succeeded by Rev. Edward Evans (1791–1861) who was a legitimate descendant of the Lombe family.

== The Evans-Lombe family ==
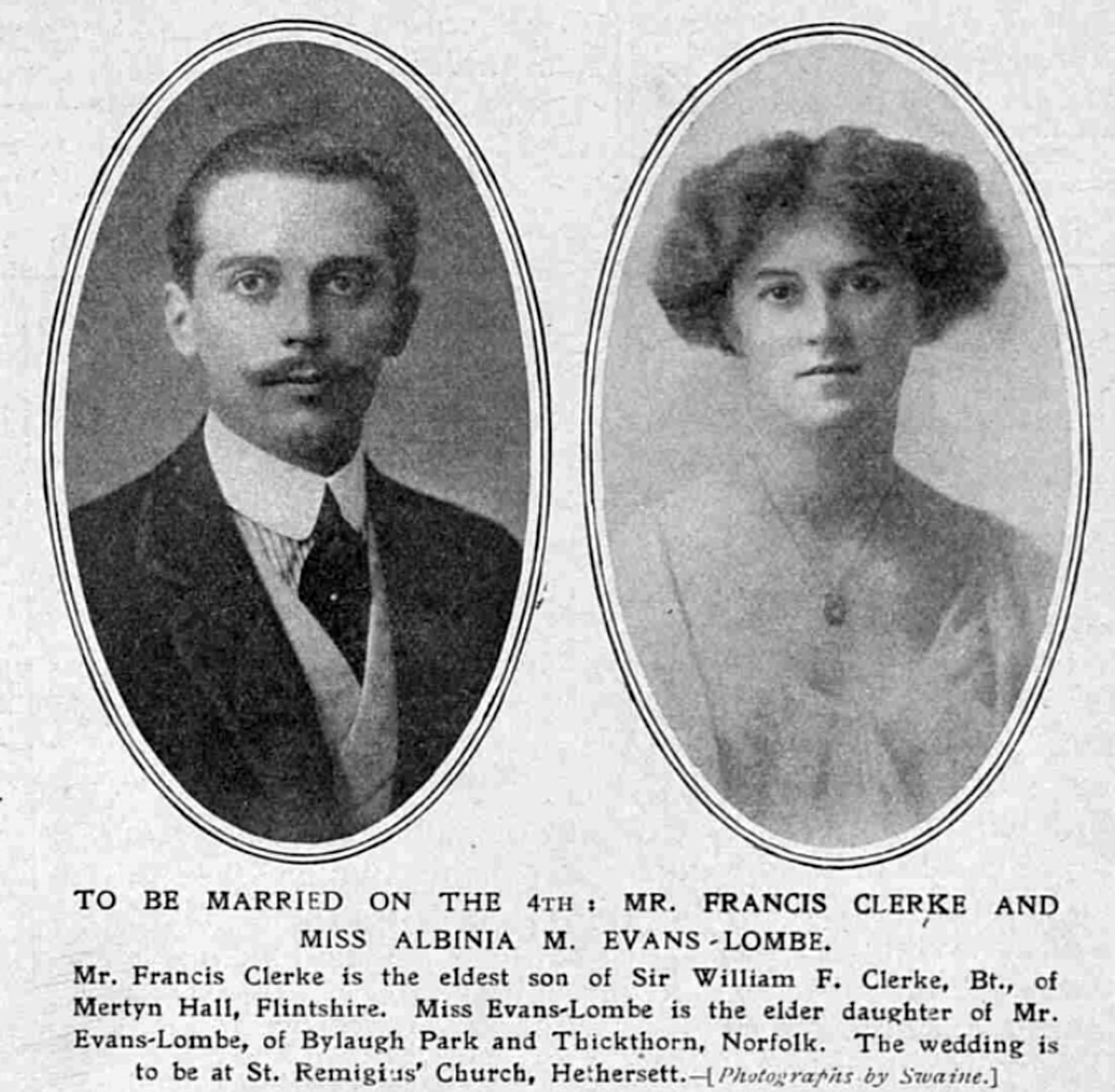
Albinia Evans-Lombe and her fiancée, 1911

On inheriting the estate, the Rev. Edward Evans took the extra name Lombe, making his surname Evans-Lombe; but he only lived for a year, and his younger brother Rev. Henry Evans then inherited in turn. He also added Lombe to his name in 1862.

Rev Henry Evans-Lombe (1792–1878) was born in 1792 in Kirby Bedon. His father was Thomas Browne Evans (1767–1827) and his mother was Mary Hase who was the niece of Sir John Lombe. He was educated at Cambridge University and became a clergyman. In 1818 he married Sophia Cubitt, daughter of Thomas Cubitt of Honing Hall, Norfolk. The 1871 Census shows Henry and Sophia living at Bylaugh Hall with some of their family. There were also fifteen servants living in the Hall: a butler, two footmen, a housekeeper, a lady's maid, three housemaids, a scullery maid, a general domestic servant, a coachman, two grooms and two gardeners.

He died in 1878 and his son Rev. Henry Evans-Lombe (1819–1897) inherited the Hall. He was born in 1819 in Norfolk. In 1849 he married his cousin Louisa Brown Evans. The couple had five children. He lived in the Hall with his family for almost twenty years and is listed in both the 1881 and 1891 censuses with a very large number of servants. He died in 1897 and his son Major Edward Henry Evans-Lombe inherited the house. He did not live in the house but instead rented it to William Knox D'Arcy, a wealthy mining magnate, from 1899 until 1917 when D'Arcy died.

Major Edward Henry Evans-Lombe (1861-1952) was born in 1861 in Suffolk. He was also educated at Cambridge University, and joined the military forces in the Prince of Wales' Own Norfolk Artillery Militia. He also managed his father's estate at Great Melton Hall. In 1886 he married Albinia Harriet Leslie-Melville, daughter of Alexander Samuel Leslie-Melville of Branston Hall, Lincoln. The couple had two daughters who were frequently mentioned in the social pages. The eldest daughter Albinia Mary Evans-Lombe was married in 1911 and a photo is shown of the couple.

In 1917 Major Edward Henry Evans-Lombe sold Bylaugh Hall and the 8,150 acre estate to speculators who promptly broke it up into lots and put it back on the market with estate agents John D Wood. The Hall and 736 acres of parkland were bought by the Marsh family.

== The Marsh family ==
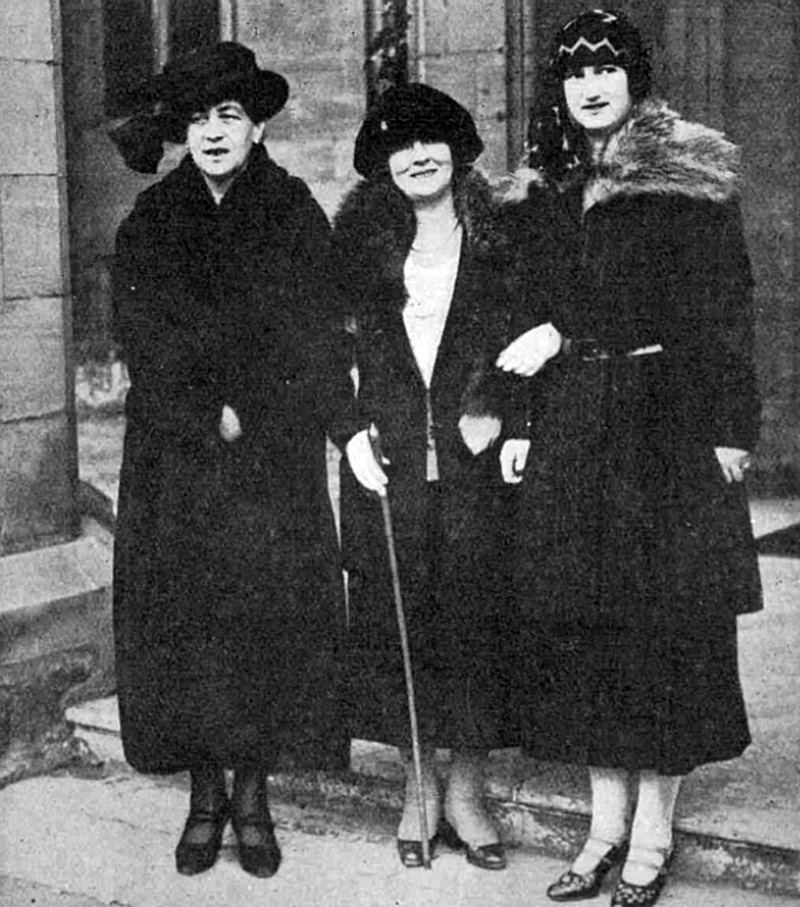
Mrs Agnes Marsh (centre) and two members of the Russian Royal Family, 1922

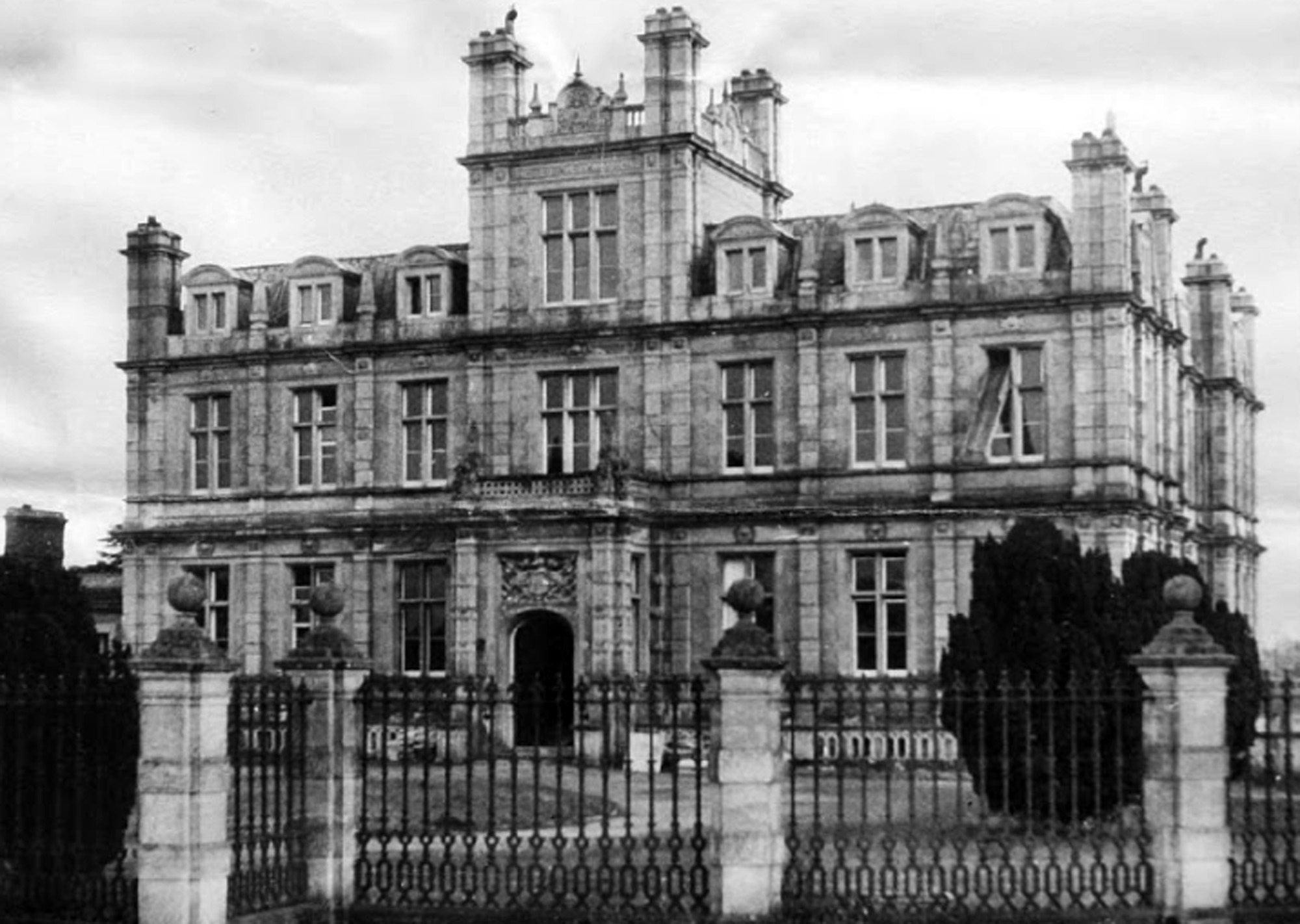
Bylaugh Hall, 1946 when it was owned by the Marsh family

The Marsh family, who were Americans, owned Bylaugh Hall until 1947. Henry Wheelwright Marsh (1860–1943) seems to have bought the Hall in 1917. He was one of the founders of the insurance brokerage firm Marsh and McLennan, with headquarters in Chicago and New York. In 1904 he married Agnes Elizabeth Power (1876–1947) who came from Boston, Massachusetts. The couple had no children but they loved to entertain. They made their home in England, while Henry 'commuted' to the US by steamer. Before settling at Bylaugh he had leased many notable historical buildings. These included Medmenham Abbey, Knebworth House and Warwick Castle. While they still held the lease on Warwick Castle, it seems that they decided to buy their own property, and so purchased Bylaugh Hall. They continued to entertain at Warwick Castle after their purchase, and a photo of Mrs Agnes Marsh with two members of Russian royalty at one of their house parties is shown. They were separated in 1926 and Agnes made her home at Bylaugh.

Other members of Agnes' family also came to live at Bylaugh Hall for extended visits. In 1922 her sister Alice Anne Rice and her brother-in-law David Rice became residents. At the same time her sister Genevieve "Viva" Power (1885–1964), who had married Dr (later Sir) Russell Wilkinson (1888–1969), moved into the Hall. A notice appeared in The Times in 1923 advertising for a nursery governess for Mrs Russell Wilkinson's two young children Derek and Diana Wilkinson at Bylaugh Hall. Agnes' sister Alice died at the Hall in 1935.

During World War II the Hall was requisitioned by the Royal Air Force. Agnes Marsh moved into the "Butler's Cottage" for the duration. The 100 Group (Bomber Support) moved there in 1944, and an account of their activities is given in 100 Group (Bomber Support): RAF Bomber Command in World War II by Martin W. Bowman.

Henry Wheelwright Marsh died in 1943 at the age of 86. Agnes Marsh died in 1947 at Butler’s Cottage, Bylaugh.

== Later history ==
In 1948 the house was sold to a new owner who unsuccessfully tried to turn it into a nursing home. By 1950, it was in disrepair, and in June of that year a 350 lot demolition sale was held which stripped the house of its lead roof and interior fittings, leaving it an abandoned ruin.

In 1999 the house (and a lodge) was sold to a local sculptor who dreamt of fully restoring it to its former glory.

By July 2009 the house and outbuildings were the subject of ongoing financial and legal problems that resulted in their complete repossession and the apparent loss of deposits by a number of people.

In February 2013 the banks by now in possession put the unfinished house up for sale.

== Present use ==
In March 2014 the house and outbuildings were purchased by Ben Budworth, owner of The Lady Magazine published in London.
