= Robert Richardson Banks =

English architect

Robert Richardson Banks (1812 – 14 December 1872) was a notable English architect of the mid 19th century who worked for many years in partnership with Charles Barry.

Banks was a pupil of William Atkinson before he joined the practice of Barry's father, Sir Charles Barry.

== Partnership ==
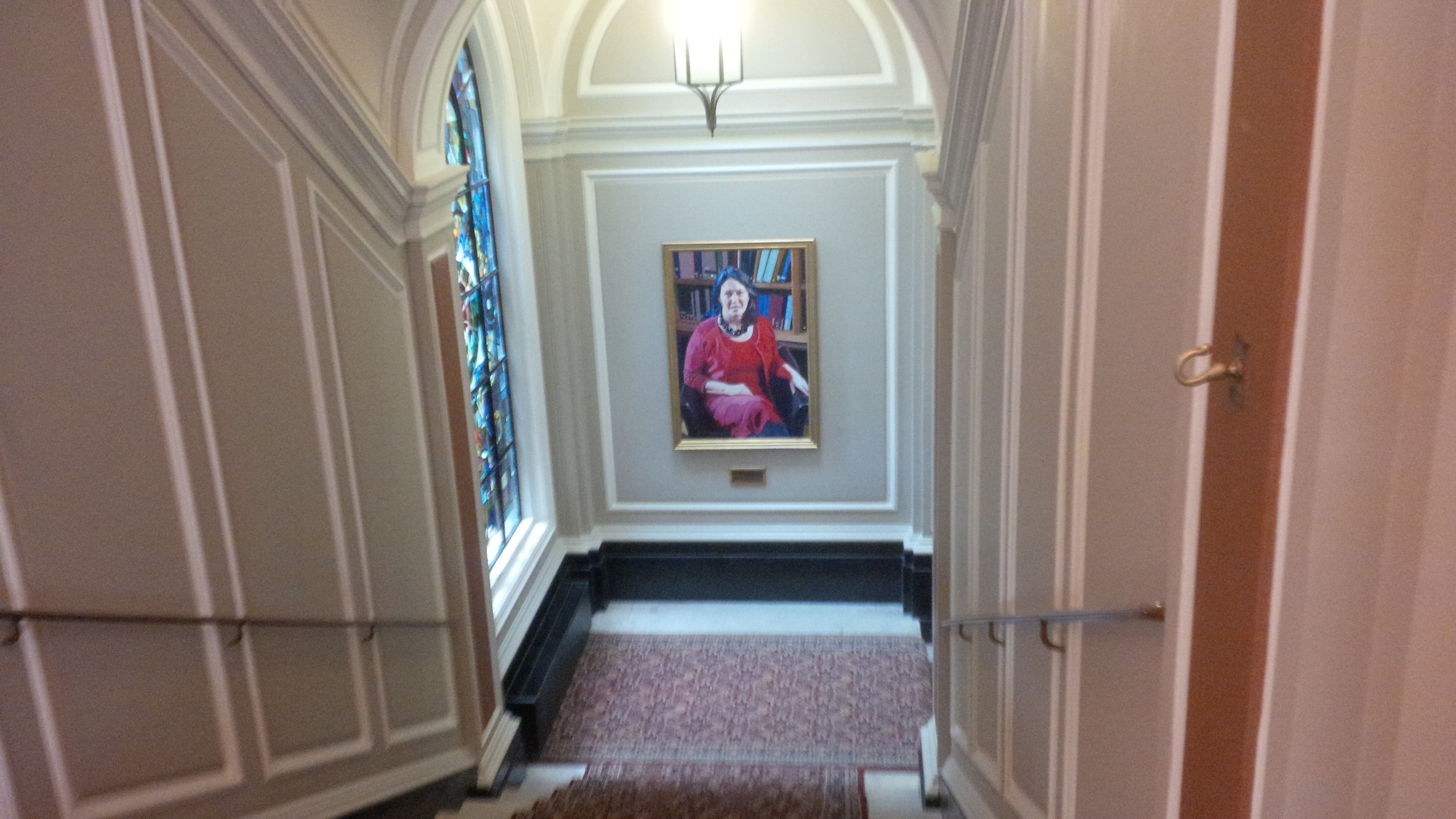
The staircase at the Royal Society of Chemistry, Burlington House, designed in a Soansian style by the partnership of Robert Richardson Banks and Charles Barry Jr.

The Banks and Barry Partnership was established in 1847 when Charles junior left his father's practice with Banks, then senior assistant in the practice. For a time (1855–64), the partnership was based at 27 Sackville Street, London. The pair managed numerous projects in London and East Anglia. The partnership was dissolved upon Banks's death in 1872. Sir Aston Webb was a pupil in the practice from 1866 to 1871.

== Notable projects ==
- The Cliff Town Estate, Southend, Essex
- Bylaugh Hall, Norfolk (1849–1852)
- The forecourt of Burlington House (home of the Royal Academy), in Piccadilly, including the apartments of the Geological Society of London (1869–73)
- 12 Kensington Palace Gardens, London
- Pumphouse/shelter in the Italian Garden, Kensington Gardens, London
