= Pierce Mahony =

Pierce Mahony may refer to:

- Pierce Mahony (Kinsale MP) (1792–1853), Irish Repeal MP for Kinsale
- Pierce Charles de Lacy O'Mahony (1850–1930), Irish Parliamentary Party MP for North Meath, known as Pierce Mahony until 1901
