= Pierce Charles de Lacy O'Mahony =

Irish nationalist politician and philanthropist

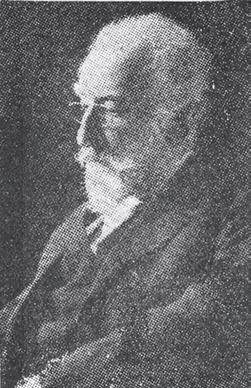
Pierce Charles de Lacy O'Mahony

Pierce Charles de Lacy O'Mahony (9 June 1850 – 31 October 1930), known up to 1901 as Pierce Mahony, and from 1912 also as The O'Mahony of Kerry, was an Irish nationalist politician and philanthropist, who practised as a barrister from 1898 to 1900. He was remarkable in having had successively three names, two wives and three faiths, and for being honoured by the Kings of two opposing countries in the First World War.

He should not be confused with his grandfather Pierce Mahony (1792–1853), a close associate of Daniel O'Connell who was elected as MP for Kinsale in 1837 but unseated on petition; or with his son Pierce Gun Mahony (1878–1914).

== Early life ==
Born in Dublin to a Church of Ireland family, Mahony was the only surviving son of Peirce Kenifeck Mahony of Kilmorna, Duagh, County Kerry, and of Jane, daughter of Robert Gun Cuninghame, D.L., of Mount Kennedy, County Wicklow. His grandfather was Pierce Mahony, Repeal MP for Kinsale. His father died shortly after he was born. When he was six his mother married Col. William Henry Vicars, and the family moved to Leamington, Warwickshire. Mahony was educated at Rugby School and at Magdalen College, Oxford, where he did not take a degree, but established an Irish Home Rule club and formed a friendship with his later Parliamentary colleague J. G. Swift MacNeill. Mahony went on to the Royal Agricultural College, Cirencester, where he won the Haygarth Gold Medal in 1875. In 1877 he married Helen Louise, only daughter of Maurice Collis, a member of the Royal Irish Academy. She died in 1899 and in 1901 he married a first cousin, Alice Johnstone, who died in her turn in 1906. An ancient stone cross taken (with permission) from the Bulgarian monastery at Bansko stands over Alice's grave in the church cemetery at Ballinure in West Wicklow, Ireland.

He resided at Warren House in Sutton, North County Dublin.

In 1913, his son Dermot O’Mahony married Grace Hill.

Mahony was an Assistant Land Commissioner 1881–84, a magistrate in County Kerry and County Limerick, Poor Law Guardian at Listowel, a member of the Roads and Piers Commission under the Relief of Distress Act 1886, and a member of the Royal Commission on Market Rights and Tolls.

== Irish nationalism ==
He was elected unopposed as Member of Parliament (MP) for North Meath in the July 1886 general election, taking his seat in the House of Commons of the United Kingdom of Great Britain and Ireland. When the Irish Parliamentary Party split over Charles Stewart Parnell's leadership in 1890, Mahony was one of the four Protestant MPs who supported Parnell. The two remained close, with Mahony entertaining Parnell in Kerry shortly before the latter's death in 1891. At the general election of 1892, Mahony was defeated in North Meath by the prominent land campaigner Michael Davitt, who had taken a particularly strong and clericalist line against Parnell from early in the crisis, by 54% to 46%. This general election was characterised by ferocious hostility to the Parnellites on the part of the Catholic Church. Mahony successfully petitioned the courts to set aside the result on the basis of clerical intimidation of the voters. In the re-run election in February 1893, Davitt did not stand, having been elected unopposed to a vacancy at Cork North East. However clerical Anti-Parnellite influence continued to be strong. The Times reported that "the priests...swarmed at all the polling stations, and kept the voters constantly in view". Mahony again lost, by the fractionally smaller margin of 53% to 47%.

Mahony remained active in the Nationalist movement, and made three further unsuccessful attempts to return to Parliament. He stood as Parnellite candidate for Dublin St Stephen's Green at a by-election in September 1895 but failed to unseat the Liberal Unionist member, William Kenny. He contested another by-election for Dublin Harbour in 1915, but came well short of election with 24% of the vote. In the 1918 general election he fought West Wicklow for the Irish Parliamentary Party but lost to the Sinn Féin candidate Robert Barton by the particularly wide margin of more than four to one.

== Later career ==
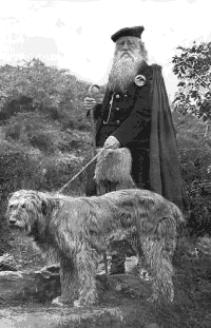
Mahony in 1930 with his wolfhound

In 1898 Mahony was called to the Irish bar, and subsequently practised as a barrister. In 1900 he inherited an estate from an uncle and thereafter did not need paid work, instead devoting himself to philanthropy. In 1903 O’Mahony travelled to Bulgaria to undertake relief work among orphans who had fled from Turkish massacres during the Ilinden-Preobrazhenie Uprising, and in 1904 opened St Patrick's Orphanage in Sofia. On the outbreak of the First World War in 1914, he unsuccessfully tried to prevent Bulgaria entering an alliance with Germany, and after the war argued for Bulgaria to be exempted from war reparations. On 20 January 1915, he was awarded the Order of Civil Merit by Ferdinand I of Bulgaria.

In 1913, O’Mahony supported the workers led by James Larkin in the Dublin Lockout.

During the First World War he served as a member of the Irish Recruiting Council for Irish regiments, and in September 1915 visited the Leinster Regiment with some members of the Irish League who were visiting the front, where he made a long speech on Ireland and on having such a fine battalion. For his recruiting work he was awarded a CBE in 1920, but declined it. Later in the year and resigned as Deputy Lieutenant of County Wicklow and as a magistrate in protest against British policy in the Irish War of Independence then in progress.

While in Bulgaria, O’Mahony had joined the Bulgarian Orthodox Church, but he remained also a member of the Church of Ireland until 1927 when a new Rector forced him to choose between the religions. He then became a Catholic, in 1929, the year before his death.

In commemoration of his relationship with the Bulgarian Orthodox church, in 1909, Pierce commissioned a fresco by Iliev Gannin, depicting Saints Methodius, Cyril and Patrick. This unique juxtaposition of important Christian saints can be found in the chapel at the monastery of St Nicholas near the town of Maglizh in Bulgaria. Some say St Patrick looks quite like Pierce O'Mahony.

His son Dermot O'Mahony was a Cumann na nGaedheal and Fine Gael member of the Dáil Éireann for Wicklow from 1927 to 1938.

A street in Sofia is named Pierce O'Mahony Street in his honour. Asenovgrad-born Bulgarian theatre director Atanas O'Mahony (b. 1979) bears the name of the Irish philanthropist. Atanas' grand-grandfather Ivan was among the Bulgarian orphans adopted by Pierce O'Mahony and given his own family name.

== Publications ==
- Pierce Mahony and J. J. Clancy, The Irish Land Crisis, The Irish Question No.4, London, Irish Press Agency, 1886
- Pierce Mahony, The Truth about Glenbeigh, The Irish Question No. 15, London, Irish Press Agency, 1887
- Pierce O’Mahony, Bulgaria and the Powers: Being a Series of Letters on the Balkans written from Sofia, Dublin, Sealy, 1915
- Seamus Shortall and Maria Spassova Sofia, 2000: Pierce O'Mahony, an Irishman in Bulgaria

== Sources ==
- Irish Independent, 1 November 1930
- F. S. L. Lyons, Charles Stewart Parnell, London, William Collins, 1977
- Oxford Dictionary of National Biography, O’Mahony [formerly Mahony], Pierce Charles de Lacy (1850–1930), politician and philanthropist, by Alan O’Day, October 2005
- The Times, 5 July and 16–24 December 1892, 23 February 1893, 2 November 1898
- Brian M. Walker (ed.), Parliamentary Election Results in Ireland, 1801-1922, Dublin, Royal Irish Academy, 1978
- Who Was Who 1929-1940

Parliament of the United Kingdom
Preceded by Kevin Izod O'Doherty	Member of Parliament for North Meath; 1886 – 1892	Succeeded by Michael Davitt
