= List of United Kingdom Parliament constituencies (1832–1868) by region =

- Previous: List of United Kingdom Parliament constituencies (1801–1832)
- Alternative list: List of United Kingdom Parliament constituencies (1832–1868)

1801 to 1832
1832 to 1868
1868 to 1885
1885 to 1918
1918 to 1950
1950 to 1974
1974 to 1983
1983 to 1997
1997 to 2024
2024 to present

== South West England (96) ==
=== Cornwall (14 then 13) ===
Constituency	1832	1835	1837	1841	1847	1852	1857	1859	1865
Bodmin	Whig	Whig	Whig	Whig	Radical	Conservative	Whig	Liberal	Liberal
Bodmin	Whig	Whig	Conservative	Conservative	Whig	Whig	Radical	Conservative	Liberal
Cornwall Eastern	Radical	Radical	Conservative	Conservative	Conservative	Whig	Whig	Liberal	Liberal
Cornwall Eastern	Whig	Whig	Whig	Conservative	Whig	Conservative	Conservative	Conservative	Conservative
Cornwall Western	Whig	Whig	Whig	Whig	Whig	Whig	Whig	Liberal	Liberal
Cornwall Western	Whig	Whig	Whig	Conservative	Whig	Whig	Whig	Liberal	Liberal
Helston	Tory	Conservative	Conservative	Conservative	Conservative	Conservative	Whig	Conservative	Liberal
Launceston	Tory	Conservative	Conservative	Conservative	Conservative	Conservative	Conservative	Conservative	Conservative
Liskeard	Radical	Radical	Radical	Radical	Radical	Radical	Whig	Liberal	Liberal
Penryn and Falmouth	Whig	Conservative	Whig	Whig	Conservative	Conservative	Whig	Liberal	Liberal
Penryn and Falmouth	Tory	Whig	Conservative	Whig	Radical	Conservative	Independent Whig	Independent Liberal	Independent Liberal
St Ives	Tory	Conservative	Conservative	Conservative	Conservative	Peelite	Conservative	Conservative	Conservative
Truro	Whig	Conservative	Whig	Whig	Whig	Whig	Whig	Conservative	Conservative
Truro	Whig	Whig	Conservative	Conservative	Conservative	Conservative	Whig	Liberal	Liberal

=== Devon (22) ===
Constituency	1832	1835	1837	1841	1847	1852	1857	1859	1865
Ashburton	Whig	Whig	Whig	Whig	Whig	Radical	Radical	Conservative	Liberal
Barnstaple	Whig	Whig	Whig	Conservative	Conservative	Conservative	Conservative	Liberal	Conservative
Barnstaple	Tory	Conservative	Conservative	Conservative	Whig	Conservative	Conservative	Liberal	Liberal
Dartmouth	Whig	Whig	Whig	Whig	Radical	Conservative	Peelite	Liberal	Conservative
Devonport	Whig	Whig	Whig	Whig	Whig	Whig	Whig	Liberal	Conservative
Devonport	Whig	Whig	Whig	Whig	Whig	Conservative	Whig	Liberal	Conservative
Devon Northern	Whig	Whig	Whig	Conservative	Conservative	Conservative	Whig	Liberal	Liberal
Devon Northern	Whig	Whig	Conservative	Conservative	Conservative	Conservative	Conservative	Conservative	Conservative
Devon Southern	Whig	Whig	Conservative	Conservative	Conservative	Conservative	Conservative	Conservative	Conservative
Devon Southern	Whig	Conservative	Conservative	Conservative	Conservative	Conservative	Conservative	Conservative	Conservative
Exeter	Whig	Conservative	Conservative	Conservative	Conservative	Conservative	Conservative	Conservative	Conservative
Exeter	Radical	Radical	Radical	Radical	Radical	Radical	Radical	Conservative	Liberal
Honiton	Tory	Conservative	Conservative	Conservative	Conservative	Whig	Whig	Liberal	Liberal
Honiton	Whig	Conservative	Whig	Conservative	Whig	Conservative	Conservative	Conservative	Conservative
Plymouth	Whig	Whig	Whig	Whig	Conservative	Conservative	Whig	Conservative	Liberal
Plymouth	Whig	Whig	Whig	Whig	Peelite	Whig	Whig	Liberal	Liberal
Tavistock	Whig	Whig	Whig	Whig	Whig	Whig	Whig	Liberal	Liberal
Tavistock	Whig	Whig	Whig	Whig	Radical	Radical	Radical	Liberal	Liberal
Tiverton	Whig	Whig	Whig	Whig	Whig	Whig	Whig	Liberal	Liberal
Tiverton	Radical	Radical	Whig	Whig	Whig	Whig	Whig	Liberal	Conservative
Totnes	Whig	Whig	Whig	Conservative	Whig	Whig	Whig	Liberal	Liberal
Totnes	Whig	Whig	Whig	Whig	Conservative	Whig	Whig	Liberal	Liberal

=== Somerset (13) ===
Constituency	1832	1835	1837	1841	1847	1852	1857	1859	1865
Bath	Whig	Whig	Conservative	Whig	Conservative	Whig	Whig	Liberal	Liberal
Bath	Radical	Radical	Conservative	Radical	Whig	Whig	Whig	Conservative	Conservative
Bridgwater	Whig	Whig	Conservative	Conservative	Whig	Whig	Whig	Liberal	Conservative
Bridgwater	Whig	Radical	Conservative	Conservative	Conservative	Conservative	Whig	Liberal	Liberal
Frome	Whig	Conservative	Conservative	Conservative	Whig	Whig	Radical	Conservative	Liberal
Somerset Eastern	Whig	Whig	Whig	Conservative	Conservative	Conservative	Conservative	Conservative	Conservative
Somerset Eastern	Whig	Conservative	Conservative	Whig	Whig	Conservative	Conservative	Conservative	Conservative
Somerset Western	Whig	Whig	Conservative	Conservative	Conservative	Conservative	Conservative	Conservative	Conservative
Somerset Western	Whig	Whig	Whig	Conservative	Conservative	Conservative	Conservative	Conservative	Conservative
Taunton	Whig	Whig	Whig	Whig	Whig	Whig	Whig	Conservative	Liberal
Taunton	Whig	Whig	Whig	Whig	Whig	Conservative	Conservative	Liberal	Liberal
Wells	Whig	Whig	Conservative	Conservative	Conservative	Conservative	Whig	Liberal	Liberal
Wells	Whig	Whig	Whig	Whig	Whig	Whig	Conservative	Conservative	Conservative

=== Dorset (14) ===
Constituency	1832	1835	1837	1841	1847	1852	1857	1859	1865
Bridport	Radical	Radical	Radical	Radical	Conservative	Radical	Radical	Liberal	Liberal
Bridport	Whig	Conservative	Radical	Radical	Radical	Radical	Whig	Liberal	Liberal
Dorchester	Tory	Conservative	Conservative	Conservative	Conservative	Whig	Whig	Liberal	Conservative
Dorchester	Tory	Conservative	Conservative	Conservative	Conservative	Conservative	Conservative	Conservative	Liberal
Dorset	Tory	Conservative	Conservative	Conservative	Conservative	Conservative	Whig	Conservative	Conservative
Dorset	Tory	Conservative	Conservative	Conservative	Conservative	Conservative	Conservative	Conservative	Conservative
Dorset	Whig	Whig	Whig	Conservative	Conservative	Conservative	Conservative	Liberal	Liberal
Lyme Regis	Whig	Whig	Whig	Whig	Whig	Whig	Whig	Liberal	Conservative
Poole	Whig	Whig	Whig	Whig	Peelite	Whig	Whig	Conservative	Liberal
Poole	Whig	Whig	Whig	Whig	Whig	Conservative	Conservative	Liberal	Liberal
Shaftesbury	Whig	Whig	Whig	Whig	Whig	Whig	Whig	Liberal	Liberal
Wareham	Tory	Conservative	Conservative	Whig	Whig	Conservative	Whig	Conservative	Liberal
Weymouth and Melcombe Regis	Whig	Whig	Conservative	Conservative	Whig	Conservative	Whig	Conservative	Conservative
Weymouth and Melcombe Regis	Tory	Whig	Conservative	Conservative	Whig	Whig	Whig	Conservative	Liberal

=== Gloucestershire (15) ===
Constituency	1832	1835	1837	1841	1847	1852	1857	1859	1865
Bristol (Partly in Somerset)	Tory	Conservative	Conservative	Conservative	Conservative	Radical	Radical	Liberal	Liberal
Bristol (Partly in Somerset)	Whig	Conservative	Radical	Radical	Conservative	Whig	Whig	Liberal	Liberal
Cirencester	Tory	Conservative	Conservative	Conservative	Conservative	Conservative	Conservative	Conservative	Conservative
Cirencester	Tory	Conservative	Conservative	Conservative	Conservative	Whig	Conservative	Liberal	Conservative
Cheltenham	Whig	Whig	Whig	Whig	Conservative	Whig	Whig	Liberal	Conservative
Gloucester	Whig	Whig	Conservative	Whig	Whig	Radical	Conservative	Liberal	Liberal
Gloucester	Whig	Conservative	Whig	Whig	Conservative	Whig	Radical	Liberal	Liberal
Gloucestershire Eastern	Whig	Conservative	Conservative	Conservative	Conservative	Conservative	Conservative	Conservative	Conservative
Gloucestershire Eastern	Whig	Whig	Whig	Conservative	Conservative	Conservative	Conservative	Conservative	Conservative
Gloucestershire Western	Whig	Whig	Whig	Whig	Conservative	Whig	Whig	Liberal	Conservative
Gloucestershire Western	Whig	Conservative	Conservative	Conservative	Whig	Conservative	Conservative	Conservative	Liberal
Stroud	Whig	Whig	Whig	Whig	Whig	Whig	Whig	Liberal	Liberal
Stroud	Whig	Whig	Whig	Whig	Whig	Whig	Whig	Liberal	Liberal
Tewkesbury	Whig	Conservative	Conservative	Conservative	Whig	Whig	Conservative	Conservative	Conservative
Tewkesbury	Whig	Whig	Conservative	Conservative	Whig	Whig	Whig	Liberal	Conservative

=== Wiltshire (18) ===
Constituency	1832	1835	1837	1841	1847	1852	1857	1859	1865
Calne	Whig	Whig	Whig	Whig	Whig	Whig	Whig	Liberal	Liberal
Chippenham	Tory	Conservative	Conservative	Conservative	Conservative	Conservative	Conservative	Conservative	Conservative
Chippenham	Whig	Conservative	Conservative	Conservative	Conservative	Conservative	Conservative	Liberal	Conservative
Cricklade	Whig	Whig	Conservative	Whig	Conservative	Conservative	Conservative	Conservative	Conservative
Cricklade	Whig	Conservative	Conservative	Conservative	Conservative	Conservative	Conservative	Liberal	Conservative
Devizes	Whig	Whig	Whig	Conservative	Conservative	Conservative	Peelite	Conservative	Conservative
Devizes	Whig	Conservative	Conservative	Conservative	Conservative	Conservative	Conservative	Conservative	Conservative
Malmesbury	Whig	Whig	Whig	Whig	Whig	Whig	Whig	Liberal	Liberal
Marlborough	Tory	Conservative	Conservative	Conservative	Peelite	Peelite	Peelite	Liberal	Liberal
Marlborough	Tory	Conservative	Conservative	Conservative	Peelite	Peelite	Peelite	Liberal	Liberal
Salisbury	Whig	Conservative	Conservative	Conservative	Whig	Whig	Whig	Liberal	Liberal
Salisbury	Tory	Whig	Whig	Whig	Peelite	Peelite	Whig	Liberal	Liberal
Westbury	Whig	Whig	Whig	Conservative	Whig	Whig	Conservative	Conservative	Conservative
Wilton	Tory	Conservative	Conservative	Conservative	Peelite	Peelite	Peelite	Liberal	Liberal
Wiltshire Northern	Whig	Whig	Conservative	Conservative	Conservative	Conservative	Conservative	Conservative	Liberal
Wiltshire Northern	Whig	Whig	Whig	Conservative	Conservative	Conservative	Conservative	Conservative	Conservative
Wiltshire Southern	Tory	Conservative	Conservative	Conservative	Peelite	Peelite	Peelite	Liberal	Conservative
Wiltshire Southern	Whig	Whig	Whig	Whig	Whig	Whig	Whig	Conservative	Liberal

== South East England (109) ==
=== Buckinghamshire (11) ===
Constituency	1832	1835	1837	1841	1847	1852	1857	1859	1865
Aylesbury	Whig	Whig	Whig	Conservative	Conservative	Radical	Conservative	Conservative	Liberal
Aylesbury	Tory	Conservative	Conservative	Conservative	Whig	Whig	Whig	Conservative	Conservative
Buckingham	Whig	Conservative	Conservative	Conservative	Conservative	Conservative	Whig	Liberal	Liberal
Buckingham	Tory	Whig	Whig	Conservative	Conservative	Conservative	Conservative	Conservative	Conservative
Buckinghamshire	Tory	Conservative	Conservative	Conservative	Whig	Conservative	Whig	Liberal	Conservative
Buckinghamshire	Whig	Conservative	Conservative	Conservative	Conservative	Conservative	Conservative	Conservative	Conservative
Buckinghamshire	Whig	Conservative	Conservative	Conservative	Conservative	Whig	Conservative	Conservative	Conservative
Great Marlow	Tory	Whig	Whig	Conservative	Conservative	Conservative	Conservative	Conservative	Conservative
Great Marlow	Whig	Conservative	Conservative	Whig	Conservative	Conservative	Conservative	Conservative	Conservative
Wycombe	Whig	Whig	Whig	Whig	Whig	Whig	Whig	Liberal	Liberal
Wycombe	Whig	Whig	Whig	Radical	Whig	Whig	Whig	Liberal	Liberal

=== Oxfordshire (9) ===
Constituency	1832	1835	1837	1841	1847	1852	1857	1859	1865
Banbury	Whig	Whig	Whig	Whig	Whig	Whig	Whig	Independent Liberal	Liberal
Oxford	Whig								
Oxford	Whig								
Oxfordshire	Whig								
Oxfordshire	Tory								
Oxfordshire	Whig								
Oxford University	Tory								
Oxford University	Tory								
Woodstock	Tory	Conservative	Conservative	Conservative	Conservative	Conservative	Conservative	Conservative	Conservative

=== Berkshire (9) ===
Constituency	1832	1835	1837	1841	1847	1852	1857	1859	1865
Abingdon	Tory	Conservative	Conservative	Conservative	Conservative	Whig	Radical	Liberal	Liberal
Berkshire	Whig								
Berkshire	Tory								
Berkshire	Whig								
Reading	Whig								
Reading	Tory								
Wallingford	Tory	Conservative	Conservative	Conservative	Conservative	Conservative	Conservative	Conservative	Liberal
Windsor	Whig								
Windsor	Whig								

=== Hampshire (19) ===
Constituency	1832	1835	1837	1841	1847	1852	1857	1859	1865
Andover	Whig								
Andover	Whig								
Christchurch	Tory	Conservative	Conservative	Conservative	Conservative	Conservative	Conservative	Conservative	Conservative
Hampshire Northern	Whig								
Hampshire Northern	Whig			Speaker	Speaker	Speaker			
Hampshire Southern	Whig								
Hampshire Southern	Whig								
Isle of Wight	Whig	Whig	Conservative	Conservative	Whig	Conservative	Whig	Liberal	Liberal
Lymington	Tory								
Lymington	Tory								
Petersfield	Whig	Radical	Conservative	Conservative	Conservative	Conservative	Conservative	Conservative	Conservative
Portsmouth	Whig								
Portsmouth	Whig								
Newport	Whig								
Newport	Whig								
Southampton	Whig								
Southampton	Tory								
Winchester	Whig								
Winchester	Whig								

=== Surrey (11) ===
Constituency	1832	1835	1837	1841	1847	1852	1857	1859	1865
Guildford	Whig								
Guildford	Tory								
Lambeth	Whig								
Lambeth	Whig								
Reigate	Tory	Conservative	Conservative	Conservative	Conservative	Conservative	Independent Whig	Liberal	Liberal
Southwark	Whig								
Southwark	Whig								
Surrey Eastern	Whig								
Surrey Eastern	Whig								
Surrey Western	Whig								
Surrey Western	Whig								

=== Sussex (18) ===
Constituency	1832	1835	1837	1841	1847	1852	1857	1859	1865
Arundel	Whig	Whig	Whig	Whig	Whig	Whig	Whig	Liberal	Liberal
Brighton	Whig								
Brighton	Whig								
Chichester	Whig								
Chichester	Whig								
Hastings	Whig								
Hastings	Whig								
Horsham	Radical	Radical	Radical	Conservative	Radical	Conservative	Conservative	Conservative	Liberal
Lewes	Whig								
Lewes	Whig								
Midhurst	Whig	Whig	Whig	Conservative	Conservative	Conservative	Conservative	Conservative	Conservative
New Shoreham	Tory								
New Shoreham	Whig								
Rye	Whig	Whig	Conservative	Whig	Whig	Whig	Peelite	Liberal	Liberal
Sussex Eastern	Whig								
Sussex Eastern	Whig								
Sussex Western	Whig								
Sussex Western	Whig								

=== Kent (18) ===
Constituency	1832	1835	1837	1841	1847	1852	1857	1859	1865
Canterbury	Whig								
Canterbury	Whig								
Chatham	Whig	Conservative	Whig	Whig	Whig	Conservative	Conservative	Conservative	Liberal
Dover	Whig								
Dover	Tory								
Greenwich	Whig								
Greenwich	Whig								
Hythe	Whig	Whig	Whig	Whig	Whig	Whig	Whig	Liberal	Liberal
Kent Eastern	Whig								
Kent Eastern	Tory								
Kent Western	Whig								
Kent Western	Whig								
Maidstone	Whig								
Maidstone	Whig								
Rochester	Whig								
Rochester	Tory								
Sandwich	Whig								
Sandwich	Whig								

=== Middlesex (14) ===
Constituency	1832	1835	1837	1841	1847	1852	1857	1859	1865
The City of London	Radical	Whig	Whig	Conservative	Whig	Conservative	Whig	Liberal	Liberal
The City of London	Whig	Whig	Whig	Whig	Whig	Whig	Whig	Liberal	Liberal
The City of London	Whig	Whig	Whig	Conservative	Whig	Whig	Whig	Liberal	Liberal
The City of London	Whig	Radical	Radical	Whig	Conservative	Whig	Whig	Liberal	Liberal
Finsbury	Whig	Radical	Radical	Radical	Radical	Radical	Radical	Liberal	Liberal
Finsbury	Whig	Radical	Radical	Radical	Radical	Radical	Whig	Liberal	Liberal
Marylebone	Whig	Radical	Whig	Whig	Whig	Whig	Whig	Liberal	Liberal
Marylebone	Whig	Whig	Radical	Radical	Whig	Whig	Whig	Liberal	Liberal
Middlesex	Radical	Whig	Whig	Whig	Whig	Whig	Whig	Liberal	Liberal
Middlesex	Whig	Radical	Conservative	Conservative	Radical	Radical	Whig	Liberal	Liberal
Tower Hamlets	Whig	Radical	Radical	Radical	Radical	Radical	Radical	Liberal	Liberal
Tower Hamlets	Radical	Whig	Whig	Whig	Radical	Radical	Radical	Liberal	Liberal
Westminster	Radical	Radical	Radical	Conservative	Radical	Radical	Radical	Liberal	Liberal
Westminster	Radical	Radical	Radical	Radical	Whig	Whig	Whig	Liberal	Liberal

== East Anglia (55) ==
=== Bedfordshire (4) ===
Constituency	1832	1835	1837	1841	1847	1852	1857	1859	1865
Bedford	Whig	Conservative	Conservative	Conservative	Whig	Conservative	Whig	Liberal	Liberal
Bedford	Whig	Whig	Conservative	Conservative	Conservative	Whig	Whig	Conservative	Conservative
Bedfordshire	Whig	Whig	Whig	Conservative	Conservative	Whig	Whig	Conservative	Liberal
Bedfordshire	Tory	Conservative	Conservative	Conservative	Whig	Conservative	Conservative	Liberal	Conservative

=== Hertfordshire (7) ===
Constituency	1832	1835	1837	1841	1847	1852	1857	1859	1865
Hertford	Tory	Conservative	Whig	Whig	Whig	Whig	Whig	Liberal	Liberal
Hertford	Tory	Whig	Conservative	Conservative	Conservative	Radical	Conservative	Conservative	Conservative
Hertfordshire	Whig	Whig	Whig	Conservative	Conservative	Conservative	Conservative	Conservative	Liberal
Hertfordshire	Whig	Conservative	Conservative	Conservative	Conservative	Conservative	Conservative	Conservative	Conservative
Hertfordshire	Tory	Conservative	Conservative	Conservative	Whig	Conservative	Whig	Liberal	Conservative
St Albans	Whig	Conservative	Conservative	Conservative	Whig	Disenfranchised for corruption in 1852			
St Albans	Whig	Whig	Whig	Whig	Conservative	Disenfranchised for corruption in 1852			

=== Huntingdonshire (4) ===
Constituency	1832	1835	1837	1841	1847	1852	1857	1859	1865
Huntingdon	Tory	Conservative	Conservative	Conservative	Conservative	Conservative	Conservative	Conservative	Conservative
Huntingdon	Tory	Conservative	Conservative	Conservative	Conservative	Conservative	Conservative	Conservative	Conservative
Huntingdonshire	Whig	Whig	Conservative	Conservative	Conservative	Conservative	Conservative	Conservative	Conservative
Huntingdonshire	Tory	Conservative	Conservative	Conservative	Conservative	Conservative	Conservative	Conservative	Conservative

=== Cambridgeshire (7) ===
Constituency	1832	1835	1837	1841	1847	1852	1857	1859	1865
Cambridge	Whig	Whig	Whig	Conservative	Whig	Whig	Conservative	Conservative	Conservative
Cambridge	Whig	Whig	Whig	Conservative	Whig	Whig	Conservative	Conservative	Conservative
Cambridge University	Tory	Conservative	Conservative	Conservative	Conservative	Conservative	Conservative	Conservative	Conservative
Cambridge University	Speaker	Speaker	Conservative	Conservative	Conservative	Conservative	Conservative	Conservative	Conservative
Cambridgeshire	Tory	Conservative	Conservative	Conservative	Conservative	Conservative	Conservative	Conservative	Conservative
Cambridgeshire	Whig	Conservative	Conservative	Conservative	Conservative	Conservative	Whig	Conservative	Conservative
Cambridgeshire	Whig	Whig	Whig	Conservative	Whig	Conservative	Conservative	Liberal	Liberal

=== Norfolk (12) ===
Constituency	1832	1835	1837	1841	1847	1852	1857	1859	1865
Great Yarmouth	Whig								
Great Yarmouth	Whig								
King's Lynn	Tory								
King's Lynn	Whig								
Norfolk Eastern	Whig								
Norfolk Eastern	Whig								
Norfolk Western	Whig								
Norfolk Western	Whig								
Norwich	Tory								
Norwich	Tory								
Thetford	Tory								
Thetford	Whig								

=== Suffolk (11) ===
Constituency	1832	1835	1837	1841	1847	1852	1857	1859	1865
Bury St Edmunds	Whig								
Bury St Edmunds	Tory								
Eye	Tory	Conservative	Conservative	Conservative	Conservative	Conservative	Conservative	Conservative	Conservative
Ipswich	Whig								
Ipswich	Whig								
Sudbury	Whig	Whig	Conservative	Whig	Disenfranchised 1844 for corruption				
Sudbury	Tory	Whig	Conservative	Whig	Disenfranchised 1844 for corruption				
Suffolk Eastern	Tory								
Suffolk Eastern	Whig								
Western division of Suffolk	Whig								
Western division of Suffolk	Whig								

=== Essex (10) ===
Constituency	1832	1835	1837	1841	1847	1852	1857	1859	1865
Colchester	Tory								
Colchester	Whig								
Essex Northern	Tory								
Essex Northern	Tory								
Essex Southern	Tory								
Essex Southern	Whig								
Harwich	Tory								
Harwich	Whig								
Maldon	Whig								
Maldon	Tory								

== West Midlands (58) ==
=== Herefordshire (7) ===
Constituency	1832	1835	1837	1841	1847	1852	1857	1859	1865
Hereford	Whig								
Hereford	Whig								
Herefordshire	Tory								
Herefordshire	Whig								
Herefordshire	Whig								
Leominster	Whig								
Leominster	Tory								

=== Worcestershire (12) ===
Constituency	1832	1835	1837	1841	1847	1852	1857	1859	1865
Bewdley	Whig	Whig	Whig	Whig	Conservative	Whig	Whig	Liberal	Liberal
Droitwich	Whig	Conservative	Conservative	Conservative	Conservative	Conservative	Conservative	Conservative	Conservative
Dudley	Whig	Conservative	Conservative	Conservative	Conservative	Conservative	Independent	Liberal	Liberal
Evesham	Whig								
Evesham	Whig								
Kidderminster	Whig	Whig	Conservative	Conservative	Peelite	Whig	Whig	Liberal	Conservative
Worcester	Whig								
Worcester	Whig								
Worcestershire Eastern	Whig								
Worcestershire Eastern	Whig								
Worcestershire Western	Tory								
Worcestershire Western	Whig								

=== Warwickshire (10) ===
Constituency	1832	1835	1837	1841	1847	1852	1857	1859	1865
Birmingham	Radical	Radical	Radical	Radical	Radical	Radical	Radical	Liberal	Liberal
Birmingham	Radical	Radical	Radical	Radical	Radical	Radical	Radical	Liberal	Liberal
Coventry	Whig	Radical	Whig	Radical	Whig	Radical	Whig	Liberal	Conservative
Coventry	Whig	Whig	Radical	Whig	Whig	Whig	Whig	Liberal	Conservative
Warwick	Tory	Conservative	Whig	Whig	Whig	Conservative	Conservative	Conservative	Conservative
Warwick	Whig	Whig	Conservative	Conservative	Conservative	Conservative	Conservative	Conservative	Liberal
Warwickshire Northern	Tory	Conservative	Conservative	Conservative	Conservative	Conservative	Conservative	Conservative	Conservative
Warwickshire Northern	Tory	Conservative	Conservative	Conservative	Conservative	Conservative	Conservative	Conservative	Conservative
Warwickshire Southern	Whig	Radical	Conservative	Conservative	Conservative	Conservative	Conservative	Conservative	Conservative
Warwickshire Southern	Whig	Conservative	Conservative	Conservative	Conservative	Conservative	Conservative	Conservative	Conservative

=== Shropshire (12) ===
Constituency	1832	1835	1837	1841	1847	1852	1857	1859	1865
Bridgnorth	Tory								
Bridgnorth	Tory								
Ludlow	Tory								
Ludlow	Whig								
Shrewsbury	Tory								
Shrewsbury	Whig								
Shropshire Northern	Tory								
Shropshire Northern	Whig								
Shropshire Southern	Tory								
Shropshire Southern	Tory								
Wenlock	Tory								
Wenlock	Tory								

=== Staffordshire (17) ===
Constituency	1832	1835	1837	1841	1847	1852	1857	1859	1865
Lichfield	Whig								
Lichfield	Whig								
Newcastle-under-Lyme	Tory								
Newcastle-under-Lyme	Tory								
Stafford	Whig								
Stafford	Whig								
Staffordshire Northern	Whig								
Staffordshire Northern	Whig								
Staffordshire Southern	Whig								
Staffordshire Southern	Whig								
Stoke-upon-Trent	Whig								
Stoke-upon-Trent	Tory								
Tamworth (Also in Warwickshire)	Tory								
Tamworth (Also in Warwickshire)	Whig								
Walsall	Tory	Conservative	Radical	Whig	Whig	Radical	Radical	Liberal	Liberal
Wolverhampton	Whig								
Wolverhampton	Whig								

== East Midlands (45) ==
=== Derbyshire (6) ===
Constituency	1832	1835	1837	1841	1847	1852	1857	1859	1865
Derby	Whig								
Derby	Whig								
Derbyshire Northern	Whig								
Derbyshire Northern	Whig								
Derbyshire Southern	Whig								
Derbyshire Southern	Whig								

=== Nottinghamshire (10) ===
Constituency	1832	1835	1837	1841	1847	1852	1857	1859	1865
East Retford	Whig	Whig	Conservative	Conservative	Conservative	Conservative	Whig	Liberal	Liberal
East Retford	Whig	Conservative	Conservative	Conservative	Conservative	Conservative	Conservative	Conservative	Conservative
Newark-on-Trent	Tory	Conservative	Conservative	Conservative	Conservative	Peelite	Peelite	Liberal	Liberal
Newark-on-Trent	Tory	Whig	Whig	Conservative	Conservative	Conservative	Peelite	Liberal	Liberal
Nottingham	Whig	Whig	Whig	Whig	Conservative	Whig	Radical	Liberal	Liberal
Nottingham	Whig	Radical	Radical	Radical	Chartist	Peelite	Peelite	Liberal	Independent Liberal
Nottinghamshire Northern	Whig	Whig	Conservative	Conservative	Conservative	Conservative	Speaker	Speaker	Speaker
Nottinghamshire Northern	Tory	Conservative	Conservative	Conservative	Conservative	Peelite	Peelite	Liberal	Liberal
Nottinghamshire Southern	Tory	Conservative	Conservative	Conservative	Conservative	Conservative	Conservative	Conservative	Conservative
Nottinghamshire Southern	Whig	Whig	Conservative	Conservative	Conservative	Conservative	Conservative	Conservative	Conservative

=== Lincolnshire (13) ===
Constituency	1832	1835	1837	1841	1847	1852	1857	1859	1865
Boston	Whig								
Boston	Whig								
Grantham	Tory								
Grantham	Tory								
Great Grimsby	Whig	Whig	Whig	Whig	Whig	Conservative	Whig	Liberal	Liberal
Lincoln	Whig								
Lincoln	Whig								
Lincolnshire Northern	Whig								
Lincolnshire Northern	Whig								
Lincolnshire Southern	Whig								
Lincolnshire Southern	Whig								
Stamford	Tory								
Stamford	Tory								

=== Leicestershire (6) ===
Constituency	1832	1835	1837	1841	1847	1852	1857	1859	1865
Leicester	Whig	Conservative	Radical	Radical	Radical	Radical	Whig	Liberal	Liberal
Leicester	Radical	Conservative	Radical	Radical	Radical	Radical	Radical	Liberal	Liberal
Leicestershire Northern	Tory	Conservative	Conservative	Conservative	Conservative	Conservative	Conservative	Conservative	Conservative
Leicestershire Northern	Radical	Radical	Conservative	Conservative	Conservative	Conservative	Conservative	Conservative	Conservative
Leicestershire Southern	Tory	Conservative	Conservative	Conservative	Conservative	Conservative	Conservative	Conservative	Conservative
Leicestershire Southern	Whig	Conservative	Conservative	Conservative	Conservative	Conservative	Conservative	Conservative	Conservative

=== Rutland (2) ===
Constituency	1832	1835	1837	1841	1847	1852	1857	1859	1865
Rutland	Whig	Whig	Whig	Whig	Whig	Whig	Whig	Liberal	Liberal
Rutland	Tory	Conservative	Conservative	Conservative	Conservative	Conservative	Conservative	Conservative	Conservative

=== Northamptonshire (8) ===
Constituency	1832	1835	1837	1841	1847	1852	1857	1859	1865
Northampton	Whig								
Northampton	Tory								
Northamptonshire Northern	Whig								
Northamptonshire Northern	Tory								
Northamptonshire Southern	Whig								
Northamptonshire Southern	Tory								
Peterborough	Whig								
Peterborough	Whig								

== North West England (48) ==
=== Cheshire (10) ===
Constituency	1832	1835	1837	1841	1847	1852	1857	1859	1865
Birkenhead	Enfranchised 1861								Conservative
Cheshire Northern	Whig	Conservative	Conservative	Conservative	Conservative	Conservative	Conservative	Conservative	Conservative
Cheshire Northern	Tory	Whig	Whig	Conservative	Whig	Whig	Conservative	Conservative	Conservative
Cheshire Southern	Whig	Conservative	Conservative	Conservative	Conservative	Conservative	Conservative	Conservative	Conservative
Cheshire Southern	Whig	Whig	Whig	Conservative	Conservative	Conservative	Conservative	Conservative	Conservative
Chester	Whig	Whig	Whig	Whig	Whig	Whig	Whig	Liberal	Liberal
Chester	Radical	Radical	Radical	Radical	Radical	Whig	Radical	Conservative	Liberal
Macclesfield	Tory	Conservative	Whig	Whig	Whig	Whig	Whig	Conservative	Conservative
Macclesfield	Whig	Whig	Conservative	Conservative	Radical	Conservative	Conservative	Liberal	Liberal
Stockport	Tory	Radical	Radical	Radical	Radical	Radical	Radical	Liberal	Liberal
Stockport	Radical	Conservative	Conservative	Radical	Conservative	Radical	Radical	Liberal	Liberal

=== Lancashire (26) ===
Constituency	1832	1835	1837	1841	1847	1852	1857	1859	1865
Ashton-under-Lyne	Radical	Radical	Radical	Radical	Radical	Radical	Radical	Liberal	Liberal
Blackburn	Whig	Whig	Whig	Conservative	Conservative	Whig	Conservative	Conservative	Conservative
Blackburn	Whig	Whig	Whig	Conservative	Whig	Radical	Whig	Liberal	Conservative
Bolton	Whig	Conservative	Whig	Whig	Conservative	Radical	Conservative	Conservative	Conservative
Bolton	Tory	Whig	Conservative	Radical	Radical	Radical	Radical	Liberal	Liberal
Bury	Whig	Whig	Whig	Whig	Whig	Peelite	Radical	Liberal	Liberal
Clitheroe	Whig	Whig	Whig	Whig	Whig	Whig	Conservative	Conservative	Liberal
Lancashire Northern	Tory	Conservative	Conservative	Conservative	Peelite	Conservative	Conservative	Conservative	Conservative
Lancashire Northern	Whig	Whig	Conservative	Conservative	Whig	Whig	Whig	Liberal	Liberal
Lancashire Southern	Whig	Conservative	Conservative	Conservative	Radical	Radical	Radical	Conservative	Conservative
Lancashire Southern	Whig	Conservative	Conservative	Conservative	Radical	Radical	Radical	Conservative	Conservative
Lancashire Southern	Representation increased to 3 seats in 1861								Liberal
Lancaster	Tory	Conservative	Conservative	Conservative	Whig	Whig	Whig	Conservative	Liberal
Lancaster	Whig	Whig	Conservative	Conservative	Peelite	Radical	Conservative	Liberal	Liberal
Liverpool	Radical	Conservative	Conservative	Conservative	Peelite	Conservative	Conservative	Liberal	Conservative
Liverpool	Tory	Radical	Conservative	Conservative	Whig	Conservative	Whig	Conservative	Conservative
Manchester	Whig	Whig	Whig	Whig	Radical	Whig	Whig	Liberal	Liberal
Manchester	Whig	Whig	Whig	Radical	Radical	Radical	Whig	Liberal	Liberal
Oldham	Radical	Radical	Radical	Radical	Radical	Radical	Radical	Liberal	Liberal
Oldham	Radical	Radical	Radical	Radical	Peelite	Peelite	Radical	Liberal	Liberal
Preston	Tory	Conservative	Whig	Whig	Whig	Conservative	Whig	Conservative	Conservative
Preston	Whig	Whig	Conservative	Whig	Whig	Whig	Conservative	Liberal	Conservative
Rochdale	Whig	Conservative	Whig	Radical	Radical	Radical	Conservative	Liberal	Liberal
Warrington	Whig	Conservative	Conservative	Conservative	Conservative	Conservative	Conservative	Conservative	Conservative
Wigan	Whig	Conservative	Whig	Conservative	Conservative	Whig	Conservative	Conservative	Conservative
Wigan	Radical	Radical	Radical	Conservative	Whig	Conservative	Whig	Liberal	Liberal

=== Cumberland (9) ===
Constituency	1832	1835	1837	1841	1847	1852	1857	1859	1865
Carlisle	Whig								
Carlisle	Whig								
Cockermouth	Whig								
Cockermouth	Whig								
Cumberland Eastern	Whig								
Cumberland Eastern	Whig								
Cumberland Western	Tory								
Cumberland Western	Tory								
Whitehaven	Tory	Conservative	Conservative	Conservative	Conservative	Conservative	Conservative	Conservative	Conservative

=== Westmorland (3) ===
Constituency	1832	1835	1837	1841	1847	1852	1857	1859	1865
Kendal	Whig	Whig	Whig	Whig	Whig	Whig	Whig	Liberal	Liberal
Westmorland	Tory	Conservative	Conservative	Conservative	Conservative	Conservative	Conservative	Conservative	Conservative
Westmorland	Tory	Conservative	Conservative	Conservative	Conservative	Conservative	Conservative	Conservative	Conservative

== Yorkshire (37) ==
=== York (2) ===
Constituency	1832	1835	1837	1841	1847	1852	1857	1859	1865
York	Whig	Conservative	Conservative	Conservative	Conservative	Conservative	Whig	Liberal	Conservative
York	Tory	Whig	Whig	Whig	Whig	Whig	Conservative	Conservative	Liberal

=== Yorkshire, North Riding (11) ===
Constituency	1832	1835	1837	1841	1847	1852	1857	1859	1865
Malton (also in East Riding)	Whig	Whig	Whig	Whig	Whig	Whig	Whig	Liberal	Liberal
Malton (also in East Riding)	Whig	Whig	Whig	Whig	Whig	Whig	Whig	Liberal	Liberal
Northallerton	Radical	Whig	Whig	Whig	Whig	Whig	Whig	Liberal	Conservative
North Riding of Yorkshire	Tory	Conservative	Conservative	Conservative	Conservative	Conservative	Conservative	Conservative	Liberal
North Riding of Yorkshire	Whig	Whig	Whig	Whig	Whig	Whig	Whig	Liberal	Conservative
Richmond	Whig	Whig	Whig	Whig	Whig	Whig	Whig	Liberal	Liberal
Richmond	Whig	Whig	Whig	Whig	Whig	Whig	Whig	Liberal	Liberal
Scarborough	Whig	Conservative	Conservative	Conservative	Peelite	Peelite	Peelite	Liberal	Liberal
Scarborough	Whig	Whig	Whig	Conservative	Whig	Whig	Whig	Liberal	Liberal
Thirsk	Whig	Whig	Whig	Whig	Whig	Conservative	Conservative	Conservative	Conservative
Whitby	Tory	Conservative	Conservative	Conservative	Conservative	Conservative	Conservative	Conservative	Conservative

=== Yorkshire, West Riding (18) ===
Constituency	1832	1835	1837	1841	1847	1852	1857	1859	1865
Bradford	Whig	Conservative	Whig	Conservative	Whig	Whig	Peelite	Liberal	Liberal
Bradford	Whig	Whig	Whig	Whig	Radical	Conservative	Radical	Liberal	Conservative
Halifax	Whig	Whig	Radical	Radical	Conservative	Whig	Radical	Liberal	Liberal
Halifax	Whig	Conservative	Whig	Whig	Whig	Radical	Whig	Liberal	Liberal
Huddersfield	Whig	Whig	Whig	Whig	Whig	Whig	Whig	Liberal	Liberal
Knaresborough	Whig	Conservative	Whig	Conservative	Peelite	Conservative	Conservative	Conservative	Conservative
Knaresborough	Whig	Whig	Whig	Conservative	Whig	Whig	Conservative	Conservative	Liberal
Leeds	Whig	Conservative	Whig	Conservative	Conservative	Whig	Whig	Liberal	Conservative
Leeds	Whig	Whig	Radical	Whig	Whig	Whig	Conservative	Conservative	Liberal
Pontefract	Whig	Whig	Conservative	Conservative	Whig	Conservative	Whig	Liberal	Liberal
Pontefract	Whig	Conservative	Whig	Conservative	Conservative	Whig	Whig	Conservative	Conservative
Ripon	Whig	Conservative	Conservative	Conservative	Conservative	Conservative	Whig	Liberal	Liberal
Ripon	Whig	Conservative	Conservative	Conservative	Peelite	Conservative	Whig	Liberal	Liberal
Sheffield	Whig	Whig	Whig	Whig	Whig	Independent Whig	Independent Whig	Independent Liberal	Independent Liberal
Sheffield	Radical	Radical	Radical	Radical	Radical	Radical	Radical	Liberal	Liberal
West Riding of Yorkshire	Whig	Whig	Whig	Conservative	Radical	Radical	Conservative	Liberal	
West Riding of Yorkshire	Whig	Whig	Whig	Conservative	Whig	Conservative	Whig	Liberal	
Northern West Riding of Yorkshire	West Riding of Yorkshire divided into Northern and Southern Divisions for the 1865 general election.								Liberal
Northern West Riding of Yorkshire	West Riding of Yorkshire divided into Northern and Southern Divisions for the 1865 general election.								Liberal
Southern West Riding of Yorkshire	West Riding of Yorkshire divided into Northern and Southern Divisions for the 1865 general election.								Liberal
Southern West Riding of Yorkshire	West Riding of Yorkshire divided into Northern and Southern Divisions for the 1865 general election.								Liberal
Wakefield	Radical	Radical	Conservative	Whig	Conservative	Conservative	Conservative	Liberal	Liberal

=== Yorkshire, East Riding (6) ===
Constituency	1832	1835	1837	1841	1847	1852	1857	1859	1865
Beverley	Whig	Conservative	Conservative	Whig	Whig	Radical	Whig	Liberal	Conservative
Beverley	Whig	Whig	Conservative	Conservative	Conservative	Radical	Ind. Conservative	Conservative	Conservative
East Riding of Yorkshire	Tory	Conservative	Conservative	Conservative	Conservative	Conservative	Conservative	Conservative	Conservative
East Riding of Yorkshire	Whig	Whig	Conservative	Conservative	Conservative	Conservative	Conservative	Conservative	Conservative
Kingston upon Hull	Whig	Conservative	Conservative	Conservative	Whig	Radical	Radical	Liberal	Liberal
Kingston upon Hull	Radical	Radical	Conservative	Conservative	Radical	Whig	Peelite	Conservative	Liberal

== North East England (20) ==
=== Northumberland (10) ===
Constituency	1832	1835	1837	1841	1847	1852	1857	1859	1865
Berwick-upon-Tweed	Whig								
Berwick-upon-Tweed	Whig								
Morpeth	Whig	Whig	Whig	Whig	Whig	Whig	Whig	Liberal	Liberal
Newcastle-upon-Tyne	Whig								
Newcastle-upon-Tyne	Tory								
Northumberland Northern	Whig								
Northumberland Northern	Tory								
Northumberland Southern	Whig								
Northumberland Southern	Tory								
Tynemouth and North Shields	Whig	Whig	Whig	Whig	Conservative	Whig	Whig	Conservative	Liberal

=== Durham (10) ===
Constituency	1832	1835	1837	1841	1847	1852	1857	1859	1865
Durham City	Whig	Conservative	Conservative	Conservative	Radical	Radical	Radical	Liberal	Liberal
Durham City	Whig	Whig	Whig	Radical	Whig	Radical	Conservative	Conservative	Conservative
Durham Northern	Whig	Whig	Whig	Whig	Whig	Whig	Whig	Liberal	Liberal
Durham Northern	Whig	Whig	Conservative	Conservative	Conservative	Conservative	Conservative	Conservative	Liberal
Durham Southern	Whig	Whig	Whig	Whig	Whig	Whig	Whig	Liberal	Liberal
Durham Southern	Whig	Whig	Whig	Whig	Conservative	Conservative	Whig	Conservative	Conservative
Gateshead	Radical	Radical	Radical	Radical	Radical	Radical	Radical	Liberal	Liberal
South Shields	Tory	Conservative	Conservative	Radical	Radical	Whig	Whig	Liberal	Liberal
Sunderland	Whig	Conservative	Conservative	Conservative	Conservative	Conservative	Whig	Liberal	Liberal
Sunderland	Whig	Whig	Whig	Whig	Whig	Radical	Radical	Liberal	Conservative

== Wales (32) ==
=== Anglesey (2) ===
Constituency	1832	1835	1837	1841	1847	1852	1857	1859	1865
Anglesey	Whig	Whig	Whig	Whig	Whig	Whig	Whig	Liberal	Liberal
Beaumaris Boroughs	Whig	Whig	Whig	Whig	Whig	Whig	Whig	Liberal	Liberal

=== Caernarvonshire (2) ===
Constituency	1832	1835	1837	1841	1847	1852	1857	1859	1865
Caernarvon Boroughs	Whig	Whig	Conservative	Conservative	Peelite	Peelite	Peelite	Conservative	Liberal
Caernarvonshire	Tory	Conservative	Conservative	Conservative	Conservative	Conservative	Conservative	Conservative	Conservative

=== Denbighshire (3) ===
Constituency	1832	1835	1837	1841	1847	1852	1857	1859	1865
Denbigh Boroughs	Whig	Conservative	Conservative	Conservative	Conservative	Conservative	Conservative	Conservative	Conservative
Denbighshire	Tory	Conservative	Conservative	Conservative	Conservative	Conservative	Whig	Liberal	Liberal
Denbighshire	Whig	Conservative	Conservative	Conservative	Conservative	Whig	Conservative	Conservative	Conservative

=== Flintshire (2) ===
Constituency	1832	1835	1837	1841	1847	1852	1857	1859	1865
Flint Boroughs	Whig	Conservative	Whig	Whig	Peelite	Peelite	Peelite	Liberal	Liberal
Flintshire	Whig	Whig	Conservative	Whig	Whig	Whig	Whig	Liberal	Liberal

=== Merionethshire (1) ===
Constituency	1832	1835	1837	1841	1847	1852	1857	1859	1865
Merionethshire	Tory	Conservative	Conservative	Conservative	Conservative	Conservative	Conservative	Conservative	Conservative

=== Montgomeryshire (2) ===
Constituency	1832	1835	1837	1841	1847	1852	1857	1859	1865
Montgomery Boroughs	Tory	Whig	Whig	Conservative	Conservative	Conservative	Conservative	Conservative	Liberal
Montgomeryshire	Tory	Conservative	Conservative	Conservative	Conservative	Conservative	Conservative	Conservative	Conservative

=== Cardiganshire (2) ===
Constituency	1832	1835	1837	1841	1847	1852	1857	1859	1865
Cardigan District	Whig	Whig	Whig	Whig	Whig	Whig	Radical	Liberal	Liberal
Cardiganshire	Tory	Conservative	Conservative	Conservative	Conservative	Conservative	Conservative	Conservative	Liberal

=== Pembrokeshire (3) ===
Constituency	1832	1835	1837	1841	1847	1852	1857	1859	1865
Haverfordwest Boroughs	Whig	Conservative	Whig	Whig	Whig	Conservative	Conservative	Conservative	Conservative
Pembroke Boroughs	Tory	Conservative	Conservative	Conservative	Peelite	Peelite	Peelite	Liberal	Liberal
Pembrokeshire	Tory	Conservative	Conservative	Conservative	Conservative	Conservative	Conservative	Conservative	Conservative

=== Carmarthenshire (3) ===
Constituency	1832	1835	1837	1841	1847	1852	1857	1859	1865
Carmarthen	Whig	Conservative	Whig	Whig	Whig	Whig	Whig	Liberal	Liberal
Carmarthenshire	Tory	Conservative	Conservative	Conservative	Conservative	Conservative	Conservative	Conservative	Conservative
Carmarthenshire	Whig	Whig	Conservative	Conservative	Conservative	Conservative	Conservative	Liberal-Conservative	Liberal-Conservative

=== Radnorshire (2) ===
Constituency	1832	1835	1837	1841	1847	1852	1857	1859	1865
Radnor Boroughs	Tory	Conservative	Conservative	Conservative	Peelite	Peelite	Whig	Liberal	Liberal
Radnorshire	Tory	Whig	Whig	Conservative	Conservative	Conservative	Conservative	Conservative	Conservative

=== Breconshire (2) ===
Constituency	1832	1835	1837	1841	1847	1852	1857	1859	1865
Brecon	Whig	Conservative	Conservative	Conservative	Whig	Conservative	Whig	Liberal	Liberal
Breconshire	Tory	Conservative	Conservative	Conservative	Conservative	Conservative	Conservative	Conservative	Conservative

=== Glamorganshire (5) ===
Constituency	1832	1835	1837	1841	1847	1852	1857	1859	1865
Cardiff District	Tory	Conservative	Conservative	Conservative	Conservative	Radical	Whig	Liberal	Liberal
Glamorganshire	Whig	Whig	Conservative	Conservative	Conservative	Conservative	Whig	Liberal	Liberal
Glamorganshire	Whig	Conservative	Whig	Whig	Whig	Whig	Whig	Liberal	Liberal
Merthyr Tydfil	Whig	Whig	Whig	Whig	Whig	Whig	Peelite	Liberal	Liberal
Swansea District	Whig	Whig	Whig	Whig	Whig	Whig	Whig	Liberal	Liberal

=== Monmouthshire (3) ===
Constituency	1832	1835	1837	1841	1847	1852	1857	1859	1865
Monmouth Boroughs	Whig	Whig	Whig	Whig	Whig	Conservative	Conservative	Conservative	Conservative
Monmouthshire	Tory	Conservative	Conservative	Conservative	Conservative	Conservative	Conservative	Conservative	Conservative
Monmouthshire	Whig	Whig	Whig	Conservative	Conservative	Conservative	Conservative	Conservative	Conservative

== Scotland (53) ==
=== Orkney and Shetland (1) ===
Constituency	1832	1835	1837	1841	1847	1852	1857	1859	1865
Orkney and Shetland	George Traill	Thomas Balfour	Frederick Dundas	Frederick Dundas	Arthur Anderson	Frederick Dundas	Frederick Dundas	Frederick Dundas	Frederick Dundas

=== Caithness (2) ===
Constituency	1832	1835	1837	1841	1847	1852	1857	1859	1865
Caithness	Whig	Whig	Conservative	Whig	Whig	Whig	Whig	Liberal	Liberal
Wick Burghs	Whig	Whig	Whig	Whig	Whig	Radical	Whig	Liberal	Liberal

=== Sutherland (1) ===
Constituency	1832	1835	1837	1841	1847	1852	1857	1859	1865
Sutherland	Whig	Whig	Conservative	Whig	Whig	Whig	Whig	Liberal	Liberal

=== Ross and Cromarty (1) ===
Constituency	1832	1835	1837	1841	1847	1852	1857	1859	1865
Ross and Cromarty	Whig	Whig	Conservative	Conservative	Whig	Whig	Whig	Liberal	Liberal

=== Invernessshire (2) ===
Constituency	1832	1835	1837	1841	1847	1852	1857	1859	1865
Inverness Burghs	Tory	Conservative	Whig	Whig	Whig	Whig	Whig	Liberal	Liberal
Inverness-shire	Whig	Whig	Conservative	Conservative	Conservative	Conservative	Conservative	Conservative	Conservative

=== Banffshire (1) ===
Constituency	1832	1835	1837	1841	1847	1852	1857	1859	1865
Banffshire	Tory	Conservative	Whig	Whig	Whig	Whig	Whig	Liberal	Liberal

=== Elginshire and Nairnshire (2) ===
Constituency	1832	1835	1837	1841	1847	1852	1857	1859	1865
Elgin Burghs	Whig	Whig	Whig	Whig	Whig	Whig	Whig	Liberal	Liberal
Elginshire and Nairnshire	Tory	Conservative	Conservative	Conservative	Conservative	Conservative	Conservative	Conservative	Conservative

=== Aberdeenshire (2) ===
Constituency	1832	1835	1837	1841	1847	1852	1857	1859	1865
Aberdeen	Whig	Whig	Whig	Whig	Whig	Radical	Whig	Liberal	Liberal
Aberdeenshire	Tory	Conservative	Conservative	Conservative	Conservative	Conservative	Whig	Liberal	Conservative

=== Kincardineshire (1) ===
Constituency	1832	1835	1837	1841	1847	1852	1857	1859	1865
Kincardineshire	Tory	Conservative	Conservative	Conservative	Conservative	Conservative	Conservative	Conservative	Liberal

=== Forfarshire (3) ===
Constituency	1832	1835	1837	1841	1847	1852	1857	1859	1865
Forfarshire	Whig	Whig	Whig	Whig	Whig	Whig	Whig	Liberal	Liberal
Montrose Burghs	Whig	Radical	Radical	Radical	Radical	Radical	Radical	Liberal	Liberal
Dundee	Whig	Whig	Whig	Whig	Whig	Whig	Whig	Liberal	Liberal

=== Perthshire (2) ===
Constituency	1832	1835	1837	1841	1847	1852	1857	1859	1865
Perth	Whig	Whig	Whig	Whig	Whig	Whig	Whig	Liberal	Liberal
Perthshire	Whig	Whig	Conservative	Conservative	Peelite	Conservative	Conservative	Conservative	Conservative

=== Clackmannanshire and Kinrossshire (1) ===
Constituency	1832	1835	1837	1841	1847	1852	1857	1859	1865
Clackmannanshire and Kinross-shire	Whig	Whig	Whig	Whig	Whig	Peelite	Whig	Liberal	Liberal

=== Fife (3) ===
Constituency	1832	1835	1837	1841	1847	1852	1857	1859	1865
Fife	Whig	Whig	Whig	Whig	Whig	Whig	Whig	Liberal	Liberal
Kirkcaldy District of Burghs	Whig	Whig	Whig	Whig	Whig	Whig	Whig	Liberal	Liberal
St Andrews Burghs	Whig	Whig	Whig	Whig	Whig	Whig	Whig	Liberal	Liberal

=== Argyllshire (1) ===
Constituency	1832	1835	1837	1841	1847	1852	1857	1859	1865
Argyllshire	Whig	Whig	Whig	Conservative	Conservative	Conservative	Whig	Liberal	Liberal

=== Dunbartonshire (1) ===
Constituency	1832	1835	1837	1841	1847	1852	1857	1859	1865
Dunbartonshire	Whig	Whig	Whig	Conservative	Conservative	Conservative	Conservative	Conservative	Conservative

=== Renfrewshire (3) ===
Constituency	1832	1835	1837	1841	1847	1852	1857	1859	1865
Greenock	Whig	Whig	Whig	Whig	Whig	Whig	Whig	Liberal	Liberal
Paisley	Whig	Radical	Radical	Radical	Radical	Radical	Radical	Liberal	Liberal
Renfrewshire	Whig	Whig	Conservative	Whig	Conservative	Conservative	Conservative	Conservative	Liberal

=== Stirlingshire (3) ===
Constituency	1832	1835	1837	1841	1847	1852	1857	1859	1865
Falkirk Burghs	Radical	Radical	Radical	Conservative	Conservative	Conservative	Radical	Liberal	Liberal
Stirling Burghs	Whig	Whig	Whig	Whig	Radical	Radical	Radical	Liberal	Liberal
Stirlingshire	Whig	Conservative	Conservative	Conservative	Conservative	Conservative	Conservative	Conservative	Liberal

=== Ayrshire (3) ===
Constituency	1832	1835	1837	1841	1847	1852	1857	1859	1865
Ayr Burghs	Whig	Whig	Whig	Whig	Whig	Radical	Radical	Liberal	Liberal
Kilmarnock Burghs	Whig	Radical	Conservative	Whig	Whig	Whig	Whig	Liberal	Liberal
Ayrshire	Whig	Whig	Radical	Conservative	Conservative	Conservative	Whig	Liberal	Conservative

=== Buteshire (1) ===
Constituency	1832	1835	1837	1841	1847	1852	1857	1859	1865
Buteshire	Tory	Conservative	Conservative	Conservative	Conservative	Peelite	Peelite	Conservative	Liberal

=== Lanarkshire (3) ===
Constituency	1832	1835	1837	1841	1847	1852	1857	1859	1865
Glasgow	Whig	Whig	Whig	Whig	Whig	Whig	Whig	Liberal	Liberal
Glasgow	Whig	Whig	Whig	Whig	Whig	Whig	Radical	Liberal	Liberal
Lanarkshire	Whig	Whig	Conservative	Conservative	Conservative	Conservative	Whig	Liberal	Liberal

=== Linlithgowshire (1) ===
Constituency	1832	1835	1837	1841	1847	1852	1857	1859	1865
Linlithgowshire	Tory	Conservative	Conservative	Conservative	Conservative	Conservative	Conservative	Liberal	Liberal

=== Midlothian (4) ===
Constituency	1832	1835	1837	1841	1847	1852	1857	1859	1865
Edinburgh	Whig	Whig	Speaker	Whig	Whig	Whig	Whig	Liberal	Liberal
Edinburgh	Whig	Whig	Whig	Whig	Radical	Radical	Whig	Liberal	Liberal
Leith Burghs	Whig	Whig	Whig	Whig	Whig	Whig	Whig	Liberal	Liberal
Midlothian	Whig	Conservative	Whig	Conservative	Conservative	Conservative	Conservative	Conservative	Conservative

=== Haddingtonshire (2) ===
Constituency	1832	1835	1837	1841	1847	1852	1857	1859	1865
Haddington Burghs	Whig	Whig	Whig	Conservative	Whig	Whig	Conservative	Liberal	Liberal
Haddingtonshire	Tory	Whig	Conservative	Conservative	Conservative	Conservative	Conservative	Conservative	Conservative

=== Dumfriesshire (2) ===
Constituency	1832	1835	1837	1841	1847	1852	1857	1859	1865
Dumfries Burghs	Whig	Whig	Whig	Radical	Radical	Radical	Radical	Liberal	Liberal
Dumfriesshire	Tory	Conservative	Conservative	Conservative	Conservative	Conservative	Conservative	Conservative	Conservative

=== Wigtownshire (2) ===
Constituency	1832	1835	1837	1841	1847	1852	1857	1859	1865
Wigtown Burghs	Whig	Whig	Whig	Whig	Whig	Whig	Whig	Liberal	Liberal
Wigtownshire	Whig	Whig	Conservative	Whig	Whig	Whig	Whig	Liberal	Liberal

=== Kirkcudbright Stewartry (1) ===
Constituency	1832	1835	1837	1841	1847	1852	1857	1859	1865
Kirkcudbright Stewartry	Whig	Whig	Whig	Whig	Whig	Whig	Whig	Liberal	Liberal

=== Peeblesshire (1) ===
Constituency	1832	1835	1837	1841	1847	1852	1857	1859	1865
Peeblesshire	Tory	Conservative	Conservative	Conservative	Conservative	Conservative	Conservative	Conservative	Conservative

=== Selkirkshire (1) ===
Constituency	1832	1835	1837	1841	1847	1852	1857	1859	1865
Selkirkshire	Whig	Conservative	Conservative	Conservative	Conservative	Conservative	Conservative	Conservative	Conservative

=== Roxburghshire (1) ===
Constituency	1832	1835	1837	1841	1847	1852	1857	1859	1865
Roxburghshire	Whig	Conservative	Whig	Conservative	Whig	Whig	Whig	Whig	Liberal

=== Berwickshire (1) ===
Constituency	1832	1835	1837	1841	1847	1852	1857	1859	1865
Berwickshire	Whig	Conservative	Conservative	Conservative	Conservative	Conservative	Conservative	Liberal	Liberal

== Ulster (29) ==
=== Antrim (6) ===
Constituency	1832	1835	1837	1841	1847	1852	1857	1859	1865
Antrim	Tory	Conservative	Conservative	Conservative	Conservative	Conservative	Conservative	Conservative	Conservative
Antrim	Whig	Whig	Conservative	Conservative	Conservative	Conservative	Conservative	Conservative	Conservative
Belfast	Whig	Whig	Whig	Conservative	Whig	Whig	Whig	Liberal	Conservative
Belfast	Whig	Conservative	Whig	Conservative	Peelite	Conservative	Conservative	Conservative	Conservative
Carrickfergus	Tory	Conservative	Conservative	Conservative	Conservative	Conservative	Conservative	Conservative	Conservative
Lisburn	Tory	Conservative	Conservative	Conservative	Peelite	Conservative	Whig	Conservative	Conservative

=== Londonderry (4) ===
Constituency	1832	1835	1837	1841	1847	1852	1857	1859	1865
Coleraine	Tory	Whig	Conservative	Conservative	Peelite	Conservative	Conservative	Conservative	Conservative
Londonderry City	Whig	Whig	Whig	Whig	Whig	Whig	Whig	Liberal	Conservative
County Londonderry	Tory	Conservative	Conservative	Conservative	Conservative	Conservative	Conservative	Conservative	Conservative
County Londonderry	Tory	Conservative	Conservative	Conservative	Conservative	Conservative	Conservative	Conservative	Conservative

=== Tyrone (3) ===
Constituency	1832	1835	1837	1841	1847	1852	1857	1859	1865
Dungannon	Tory	Conservative	Conservative	Conservative	Conservative	Conservative	Conservative	Conservative	Conservative
Tyrone	Tory	Conservative	Conservative	Conservative	Peelite	Conservative	Conservative	Conservative	Conservative
Tyrone	Tory	Conservative	Conservative	Conservative	Peelite	Conservative	Conservative	Conservative	Conservative

=== Armagh (4) ===
Constituency	1832	1835	1837	1841	1847	1852	1857	1859	1865
Armagh	Whig	Whig	Whig	Whig	Whig	Conservative	Conservative	Conservative	Conservative
County Armagh	Whig	Whig	Whig	Whig	Whig	Whig	Conservative	Conservative	Conservative
County Armagh	Tory	Conservative	Conservative	Conservative	Conservative	Conservative	Conservative	Conservative	Conservative
Newry (Also in Down)	Tory	Whig	Conservative	Conservative	Peelite	Whig	Whig	Conservative	Conservative

=== Down (3) ===
Constituency	1832	1835	1837	1841	1847	1852	1857	1859	1865
Down	Whig	Whig	Conservative	Conservative	Conservative	Conservative	Conservative	Conservative	Conservative
Down	Tory	Conservative	Conservative	Conservative	Conservative	Conservative	Conservative	Conservative	Conservative
Downpatrick	Tory	Conservative	Conservative	Conservative	Peelite	Conservative	Peelite	Conservative	Conservative

=== Fermanagh (3) ===
Constituency	1832	1835	1837	1841	1847	1852	1857	1859	1865
Enniskillen	Tory	Conservative	Conservative	Conservative	Conservative	Conservative	Conservative	Conservative	Conservative
Fermanagh	Tory	Conservative	Conservative	Conservative	Conservative	Conservative	Conservative	Conservative	Conservative
Fermanagh	Tory	Conservative	Conservative	Conservative	Conservative	Conservative	Conservative	Conservative	Conservative

=== Donegal (2) ===
Constituency	1832	1835	1837	1841	1847	1852	1857	1859	1865
Donegal	Tory	Conservative	Conservative	Conservative	Conservative	Conservative	Conservative	Conservative	Conservative
Donegal	Tory	Conservative	Conservative	Conservative	Conservative	Conservative	Conservative	Conservative	Conservative

=== Monaghan (2) ===
Constituency	1832	1835	1837	1841	1847	1852	1857	1859	1865
Monaghan	Whig	Conservative	Conservative	Whig	Whig	Conservative	Conservative	Conservative	Conservative
Monaghan	Tory	Whig	Whig	Conservative	Conservative	Conservative	Conservative	Conservative	Liberal

=== Cavan (2) ===
Constituency	1832	1835	1837	1841	1847	1852	1857	1859	1865
Cavan	Tory	Conservative	Conservative	Conservative	Peelite	Peelite	Conservative	Conservative	Conservative
Cavan	Tory	Conservative	Conservative	Conservative	Conservative	Conservative	Conservative	Conservative	Liberal

== Connacht (14) ==
=== Galway (4) ===
Constituency	1832	1835	1837	1841	1847	1852	1857	1859	1865
Galway Borough	Irish Repeal	Irish Repeal/Whig	Irish Repeal/Whig	Irish Repeal	Irish Repeal	Independent Irish	Whig	Conservative	Liberal
Galway Borough	Irish Repeal	Irish Repeal/Whig	Irish Repeal/Whig	Irish Repeal	Irish Repeal	Independent Irish	Whig	Liberal	Liberal
County Galway	Whig	Whig	Whig	Whig	Irish Repeal	Independent Irish	Whig	Liberal	Liberal
County Galway	Tory	Whig	Whig	Whig	Conservative	Independent Irish	Whig	Liberal	Liberal

=== Leitrim (2) ===
Constituency	1832	1835	1837	1841	1847	1852	1857	1859	1865
Leitrim	Whig	Whig	Whig	Whig	Whig	Conservative	Conservative	Conservative	Conservative
Leitrim	Whig	Whig	Whig	Whig	Whig	Independent Irish	Independent Irish	Liberal	Liberal

=== Roscommon (3) ===
Constituency	1832	1835	1837	1841	1847	1852	1857	1859	1865
Athlone (also in Westmeath)	Whig	Conservative	Whig	Conservative	Peelite	Peelite	Independent Irish	Liberal	Liberal
Roscommon	Whig	Whig	Whig	Whig	Whig	Independent Irish	Whig	Liberal	Liberal
Roscommon	Irish Repeal	Irish Repeal/Whig	Irish Repeal/Whig	Irish Repeal	Whig	Independent Irish	Whig	Conservative	Liberal

=== Sligo (3) ===
Constituency	1832	1835	1837	1841	1847	1852	1857	1859	1865
Sligo	Whig	Whig	Whig	Irish Repeal	Irish Repeal	Whig	Conservative	Conservative	Liberal
County Sligo	Tory	Conservative	Conservative	Conservative	Conservative	Conservative	Conservative	Conservative	Conservative
County Sligo	Tory	Conservative	Conservative	Conservative	Conservative	Independent Irish	Conservative	Conservative	Conservative

=== Mayo (2) ===
Constituency	1832	1835	1837	1841	1847	1852	1857	1859	1865
Mayo	Whig	Irish Repeal/Whig	Irish Repeal	Irish Repeal	Whig	Independent Irish	Conservative	Liberal	Liberal
Mayo	Whig	Whig	Irish Repeal	Irish Repeal	Irish Repeal	Independent Irish	Independent Irish	Conservative	Conservative

== Leinster (35) ==
=== Longford (2) ===
Constituency	1832	1835	1837	1841	1847	1852	1857	1859	1865
County Longford	Irish Repeal	Conservative	Irish Repeal/Whig	Irish Repeal	Irish Repeal	Independent Irish	Whig	Liberal	Liberal
County Longford	Irish Repeal	Conservative	Irish Repeal/Whig	Irish Repeal	Irish Repeal	Independent Irish	Whig	Liberal	Liberal

=== Louth (4) ===
Constituency	1832	1835	1837	1841	1847	1852	1857	1859	1865
Drogheda	Irish Repeal	Irish Repeal	Whig	Whig	Whig	Independent Irish	Whig	Liberal	Liberal
Dundalk	Whig	Radical	Whig	Whig	Irish Repeal	Independent Irish	Whig	Liberal	Liberal
County Louth	Irish Repeal	Whig	Whig	Whig	Whig	Whig	Whig	Liberal	Liberal
County Louth	Irish Repeal	Irish Repeal/Whig	Irish Repeal/Whig	Whig	Whig	Independent Irish	Conservative	Liberal	Liberal

=== King's County (2) ===
Constituency	1832	1835	1837	1841	1847	1852	1857	1859	1865
King's County	Irish Repeal	Irish Repeal/Whig	Irish Repeal/Whig	Whig	Whig	Independent Irish	Whig	Conservative	Conservative
King's County	Whig	Whig	Whig	Whig	Whig	Independent Irish	Whig	Liberal	Liberal

=== Queen's County (3) ===
Constituency	1832	1835	1837	1841	1847	1852	1857	1859	1865
Portarlington (also in King's County)	Tory	Conservative	Conservative	Conservative	Whig	Conservative	Conservative	Conservative	Liberal
Queen's County	Irish Repeal	Conservative	Conservative	Conservative	Conservative	Conservative	Conservative	Conservative	Conservative
Queen's County	Tory	Conservative	Whig	Conservative	Whig	Independent Irish	Whig	Liberal	Liberal

=== Meath (2) ===
Constituency	1832	1835	1837	1841	1847	1852	1857	1859	1865
Meath	Irish Repeal	Irish Repeal/Whig	Irish Repeal/Whig	Irish Repeal	Whig	Independent Irish	Independent Irish	Liberal	Liberal
Meath	Irish Repeal	Irish Repeal/Whig	Irish Repeal/Whig	Irish Repeal	Irish Repeal	Independent Irish	Independent Irish	Liberal	Liberal

=== Westmeath (2) ===
Constituency	1832	1835	1837	1841	1847	1852	1857	1859	1865
Westmeath	Whig	Whig	Whig	Whig	Irish Repeal	Independent Irish	Whig	Liberal	Liberal
Westmeath	Irish Repeal	Irish Repeal/Whig	Irish Repeal/Whig	Whig	Whig	Independent Irish	Independent Irish	Liberal	Liberal

=== Carlow (3) ===
Constituency	1832	1835	1837	1841	1847	1852	1857	1859	1865
Carlow	Irish Repeal	Conservative	Whig	Whig	Whig	Independent Irish	Conservative	Liberal	Liberal
County Carlow	Irish Repeal	Conservative	Irish Repeal/Whig	Conservative	Conservative	Independent Irish	Conservative	Conservative	Conservative
County Carlow	Whig	Conservative	Whig	Conservative	Conservative	Conservative	Conservative	Conservative	Conservative

=== Dublin (6) ===
Constituency	1832	1835	1837	1841	1847	1852	1857	1859	1865
Dublin	Irish Repeal	Irish Repeal/Whig	Irish Repeal/Whig	Conservative	Conservative	Conservative	Conservative	Conservative	Conservative
Dublin	Irish Repeal	Irish Repeal/Whig	Whig	Conservative	Irish Repeal	Conservative	Conservative	Conservative	Liberal
County Dublin	Irish Repeal	Irish Repeal/Whig	Whig	Conservative	Conservative	Conservative	Conservative	Conservative	Conservative
County Dublin	Whig	Whig	Whig	Conservative	Conservative	Conservative	Conservative	Conservative	Conservative
Dublin University	Tory	Conservative	Conservative	Conservative	Conservative	Conservative	Conservative	Conservative	Conservative
Dublin University	Tory	Conservative	Conservative	Conservative	Conservative	Conservative	Conservative	Conservative	Conservative

=== Wicklow (2) ===
Constituency	1832	1835	1837	1841	1847	1852	1857	1859	1865
Wicklow	Whig	Whig	Whig	Conservative	Whig	Whig	Whig	Liberal	Liberal
Wicklow	Whig	Whig	Whig	Whig	Conservative	Conservative	Conservative	Conservative	Conservative

=== Kildare (2) ===
Constituency	1832	1835	1837	1841	1847	1852	1857	1859	1865
Kildare	Irish Repeal	Whig	Whig	Whig	Whig	Independent Irish	Radical	Liberal	Liberal
Kildare	Whig	Irish Repeal/Whig	Whig	Whig	Conservative	Independent Irish	Whig	Liberal	Liberal

=== Kilkenny (3) ===
Constituency	1832	1835	1837	1841	1847	1852	1857	1859	1865
Kilkenny City	Irish Repeal	Whig	Whig	Irish Repeal	Irish Repeal	Whig	Independent Irish	Liberal	Liberal
County Kilkenny	Irish Repeal	Irish Repeal	Irish Repeal/Whig	Irish Repeal	Irish Repeal	Independent Irish	Whig	Liberal	Liberal
County Kilkenny	Irish Repeal	Irish Repeal	Whig	Whig	Irish Repeal	Independent Irish	Independent Irish	Liberal	Liberal

=== Wexford (4) ===
Constituency	1832	1835	1837	1841	1847	1852	1857	1859	1865
New Ross	Irish Repeal	Whig	Whig	Whig	Irish Repeal	Whig	Conservative	Conservative	Conservative
Wexford	Irish Repeal	Whig	Whig	Whig	Irish Repeal	Whig	Whig	Liberal	Liberal
County Wexford	Whig	Irish Repeal/Whig	Irish Repeal/Whig	Whig	Irish Repeal	Independent Irish	Independent Irish	Liberal	Conservative
County Wexford	Whig	Irish Repeal/Whig	Irish Repeal/Whig	Irish Repeal	Irish Repeal	Conservative	Whig	Conservative	Liberal

== Munster (29) ==
=== Clare (3) ===
Constituency	1832	1835	1837	1841	1847	1852	1857	1859	1865
Clare	Irish Repeal	Irish Repeal/Whig	Irish Repeal/Whig	Irish Repeal	Conservative	Whig	Independent Irish	Conservative	Liberal
Clare	Irish Repeal	Irish Repeal/Whig	Irish Repeal/Whig	Irish Repeal	Irish Repeal	Independent Irish	Independent Irish	Liberal	Conservative
Ennis	Irish Repeal	Radical	Radical	Radical	Irish Repeal	Independent Irish	Whig	Liberal	Liberal

=== Tipperary (4) ===
Constituency	1832	1835	1837	1841	1847	1852	1857	1859	1865
Cashel	Irish Repeal	Whig	Whig	Whig	Irish Repeal	Whig	Whig	Liberal	Liberal
Clonmel	Irish Repeal	Irish Repeal/Whig	Whig	Whig	Irish Repeal	Independent Irish	Whig	Liberal	Liberal
Tipperary	Whig	Whig	Irish Repeal/Whig	Whig	Irish Repeal	Independent Irish	Independent Irish	Liberal	Liberal
Tipperary	Irish Repeal	Irish Repeal/Whig	Whig	Whig	Irish Repeal	Independent Irish	Whig	Liberal	Liberal

=== Limerick (4) ===
Constituency	1832	1835	1837	1841	1847	1852	1857	1859	1865
Limerick City	Irish Repeal	Irish Repeal/Whig	Irish Repeal/Whig	Radical	Irish Repeal	Independent Irish	Whig	Liberal	Liberal
Limerick City	Irish Repeal	Irish Repeal/Whig	Irish Repeal/Whig	Irish Repeal	Irish Repeal	Whig	Whig	Liberal	Liberal
County Limerick	Whig	Whig	Whig	Whig	Peelite	Peelite	Peelite	Liberal	Liberal
County Limerick	Whig	Whig	Whig	Whig	Irish Confederate	Whig	Whig	Conservative	Liberal

=== Kerry (3) ===
Constituency	1832	1835	1837	1841	1847	1852	1857	1859	1865
Kerry	Irish Repeal	Irish Repeal/Whig	Irish Repeal/Whig	Whig	Irish Repeal	Whig	Whig	Liberal	Liberal
Kerry	Irish Repeal	Irish Repeal/Whig	Conservative	Irish Repeal	Peelite	Peelite	Peelite	Liberal	Liberal
Tralee	Irish Repeal	Irish Repeal/Whig	Conservative	Irish Repeal	Irish Repeal	Whig	Whig	Liberal	Liberal

=== Cork (8) ===
Constituency	1832	1835	1837	1841	1847	1852	1857	1859	1865
Bandon	Tory	Conservative	Conservative	Conservative	Conservative	Conservative	Conservative	Conservative	Conservative
Cork City	Irish Repeal	Conservative	Irish Repeal	Irish Repeal	Irish Repeal	Whig	Whig	Liberal	Liberal
Cork City	Irish Repeal	Conservative	Irish Repeal	Whig	Irish Repeal	Whig	Whig	Liberal	Liberal
County Cork	Irish Repeal	Conservative	Irish Repeal	Irish Repeal	Irish Repeal	Independent Irish	Whig	Liberal	Liberal
County Cork	Irish Repeal	Irish Repeal	Irish Repeal	Irish Repeal	Irish Repeal	Whig	Independent Irish	Liberal	Conservative
Kinsale	Whig	Conservative	Whig	Whig	Conservative	Whig	Whig	Liberal	Liberal
Mallow	Irish Repeal	Whig	Whig	Whig	Whig	Whig	Whig	Conservative	Liberal
Youghal	Irish Repeal	Irish Repeal/Whig	Whig	Whig	Irish Confederate	Conservative	Whig	Liberal	Liberal

=== Waterford (5) ===
Constituency	1832	1835	1837	1841	1847	1852	1857	1859	1865
Dungarvan	Whig	Whig	Whig	Radical	Radical	Independent Irish	Independent Irish	Liberal	Liberal
Waterford City	Irish Repeal	Irish Repeal	Irish Repeal	Conservative	Irish Repeal	Independent Irish	Independent Irish	Liberal	Liberal
Waterford City	Tory	Whig	Whig	Conservative	Irish Repeal	Independent Irish	Conservative	Conservative	Liberal
County Waterford	Irish Repeal	Irish Repeal/Whig	Whig	Whig	Irish Repeal	Independent Irish	Radical	Liberal	Conservative
County Waterford	Whig	Whig	Whig	Whig	Irish Repeal	Independent Irish	Whig	Conservative	Liberal
