= John Arnott =

Founder of Arnotts (1814–1898)

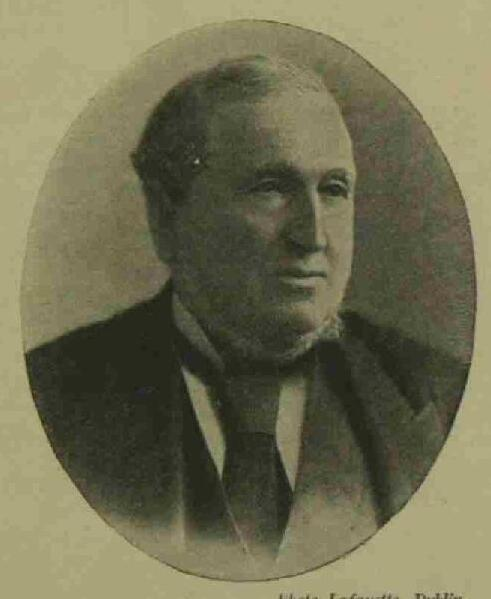
- Born: 26 July 1814
- Died: 28 March 1898 (aged 83)
- Occupation: Politician
- Spouse(s): Mary McKinlay, Emily Jane Fitzgerald
- Children: 10

Sir John Arnott, 1st Baronet JP (26 July 1814 – 28 March 1898) was a British-Irish entrepreneur and a major figure in the commercial and political spheres of late-19th century Cork. He was also founder of the Arnotts department chain.

== Background ==
Born in Auchtermuchty, Fife, he was the son of John Arnott and his wife Elizabeth, daughter of Alexander Paton. He arrived in Cork in 1837 to work at Grants of Patrick Street; He later opened his own shop which failed to prosper. After starting a business in Belfast, which prospered, he returned to Cork and opened a drapery store. He later expanded this business across Ireland and Britain, including Arnotts in Henry Street, Dublin and in Glasgow (where the name continued until the early-1990s).

== Career ==
Among the other businesses he started or was involved in included Baldoyle and Cork Race Park Meetings, the City of Cork Steamship Company, Cork and Macroom Direct Railway, Passage Docks Shipbuilding Company, the Bristol General Steam Navigation Company and Arnotts Brewery Cork.

He acquired the Irish Times and The Northern Whig newspapers, though he later disposed of the Whig over disputes relating to its editorial policy - including the publication of an "attack" on Catholics. His family retained a connection with the paper until the 1960s, although they had disposed of their interest earlier.

Although several of his business interests were based in Dublin, Arnott lived and managed his affairs from Cork. He was elected Lord Mayor of Cork three times, in 1859, 1860 and 1861. Arnott was also Sheriff of Cork City in 1871. He was Justice of the Peace for Cork City and County and served as Member of Parliament for Kinsale between 1859 and 1863. Arnott was created a Knight Bachelor by the Lord Lieutenant of Ireland in 1859 and became a baronet, of Baily, in the County of Dublin on 12 February 1896.

He was a philanthropist and was heavily involved into an investigation in the treatment of children at the Cork workhouse. In this period the Irish Poor Law Relief Bill was going through Parliament and he sat on the select committee. There is a plaque on St Patrick's Bridge in Cork that commemorates its opening by Arnott on 12 December 1861.

In 1896, he bought the Duke of Devonshire's Irish estate in County Cork for about £250,000, and turned it onto a 32,000 acre stud farm, both for his own interest in horse racing, and to improve the livestock of local farmers.

He married Mary, the daughter of John James McKinlay. See Arnott baronets for his descendants.

== Death and legacy ==
John Arnott died on 28 March 1898, aged 84, at his home in Montenotte, Cork. He is buried in the churchyard of St Luke's Church, Douglas in Cork.

Arnott Street in Portobello, Dublin, is named for Arnott. In 1874, Arnott along with James Fitzgerald Lombard JP, a long-time director of Arnott's department store, and Edward McMahon purchased property in this area. Lombard Street West and McMahon Street were also eponymously named in this area.

== Arms ==
Coat of arms of John Arnott
Notes Granted 8 February 1896 by Arthur Edward Vicars, Ulster King of Arms. Crest On a wreath of the colours a tower on a rock Proper with a pennon of one point statant Azure. Escutcheon Per chevron Argent and Azure in chief two mullets and in base a crescent counterchanged on a chief of the second three mullets of the first. Motto Speratum Et Completum

== See also ==
- Irish Times
- Arnott baronets

Parliament of the United Kingdom
Preceded by John Isaac Heard	Member of Parliament for Kinsale; 1859 – 1863	Succeeded by George Conway Colthurst
Baronetage of the United Kingdom
New creation	Baronet (of Baily); 1896–1898	Succeeded by John Alexander Arnott
