= Eugene Collins =

Eugene Collins MP

Member of Parliament for Kinsale
- In office 31 January 1874 – 24 November 1885
- Preceded by: George Colthurst
- Succeeded by: Constituency abolished

Personal details
- Born: 1822
- Died: 10 March 1895 (aged 72)
- Party: Home Rule League

Eugene Collins (1822 – 10 March 1895) was an Irish Home Rule League politician.

He was elected as the Member of Parliament (MP) for Kinsale in 1874 and held the seat until it was abolished in 1885.

He had one child, Captain Harry Eugene Taunton-Collins (died 20 December 1902).

Parliament of the United Kingdom
Preceded by George Colthurst	Member of Parliament for Kinsale; 1874 – 1885	Constituency abolished
