= List of United Kingdom Parliament constituencies (1868–1885) by region =

1801 to 1832
1832 to 1868
1868 to 1885
1885 to 1918
1918 to 1945
1950 to 1974
1974 to 1983
1983 to 1997
1997 to 2024
2024 to present

== South West England (81) ==
=== Cornwall (13) ===
Constituency	1868	1874	1880
Bodmin	Liberal	Liberal	Liberal
Cornwall East (Two members)	Liberal	Liberal	Liberal
Cornwall East (Two members)	Liberal	Conservative	Liberal
Cornwall West (Two members)	Liberal	Liberal	Liberal
Cornwall West (Two members)	Liberal	Liberal	Liberal
Helston	Liberal	Liberal	Conservative
Launceston	Conservative	Conservative	Conservative
Liskeard	Liberal	Liberal	Liberal
Penryn and Falmouth (Two members)	Conservative	Liberal	Liberal
Penryn and Falmouth (Two members)	Conservative	Liberal	Liberal
St Ives	Liberal	Conservative	Liberal
Truro (Two members)	Conservative	Conservative	Conservative
Truro (Two members)	Liberal	Conservative	Liberal

=== Devon (17) ===
Constituency	1868	1874	1880
Barnstaple (Two members)	Liberal	Liberal	Liberal
Barnstaple (Two members)	Conservative	Liberal	Conservative
Devonport (Two members)	Liberal	Conservative	Conservative
Devonport (Two members)	Liberal	Conservative	Conservative
Devonshire East (Two members)	Conservative	Conservative	Conservative
Devonshire East (Two members)	Conservative	Conservative	Conservative
Devonshire North (Two members)	Liberal	Liberal	Liberal
Devonshire North (Two members)	Conservative	Conservative	Conservative
Devonshire South (Two members)	Conservative	Conservative	Conservative
Devonshire South (Two members)	Conservative	Conservative	Conservative
Exeter (Two members)	Liberal	Conservative	Liberal
Exeter (Two members)	Liberal	Conservative	Conservative
Plymouth (Two members)	Liberal	Conservative	Conservative
Plymouth (Two members)	Liberal	Conservative	Liberal
Tavistock	Liberal	Liberal	Liberal
Tiverton (Two members)	Liberal	Liberal	Liberal
Tiverton (Two members)	Liberal	Liberal	Liberal

=== Somerset (13) ===
Constituency	1868	1874	1880
Bath (Two members)	Liberal	Liberal	Liberal
Bath (Two members)	Liberal	Conservative	Liberal
Bridgwater (Two members)	Liberal	Disenfranchised for corruption in 1870	
Bridgwater (Two members)	Liberal	Disenfranchised for corruption in 1870	
Frome	Liberal	Conservative	Liberal
Somerset East (Two members)	Conservative	Conservative	Conservative
Somerset East (Two members)	Conservative	Conservative	Conservative
Somerset Mid (Two members)	Conservative	Conservative	Conservative
Somerset Mid (Two members)	Conservative	Conservative	Conservative
Somerset West (Two members)	Conservative	Conservative	Conservative
Somerset West (Two members)	Conservative	Conservative	Conservative
Taunton (Two members)	Liberal	Liberal	Liberal
Taunton (Two members)	Conservative	Liberal	Conservative

=== Dorset (10) ===
Constituency	1868	1874	1880
Bridport	Liberal	Liberal	Conservative
Dorchester	Conservative	Conservative	Conservative
Dorset (Three members)	Conservative	Conservative	Liberal
Dorset (Three members)	Liberal	Liberal	Conservative
Dorset (Three members)	Conservative	Conservative	Conservative
Poole	Conservative	Liberal	Conservative
Shaftesbury	Liberal	Conservative	Liberal
Wareham	Liberal	Conservative	Liberal
Weymouth and Melcombe Regis (Two members)	Liberal	Liberal	Liberal
Weymouth and Melcombe Regis (Two members)	Conservative	Conservative	Conservative

=== Gloucestershire (13) ===
Constituency	1868	1874	1880
Bristol (Two members) (Partly in Somerset)	Liberal	Liberal	Liberal
Bristol (Two members) (Partly in Somerset)	Liberal	Liberal	Liberal
Cheltenham	Liberal	Conservative	Liberal
Cirencester	Conservative	Conservative	Conservative
Gloucester (Two members)	Liberal	Liberal	Liberal
Gloucester (Two members)	Liberal	Conservative	Liberal
Gloucestershire East (Two members)	Conservative	Conservative	Conservative
Gloucestershire East (Two members)	Conservative	Conservative	Conservative
Gloucestershire West (Two members)	Liberal	Liberal	Liberal
Gloucestershire West (Two members)	Liberal	Conservative	Liberal
Stroud (Two members)	Liberal	Liberal	Liberal
Stroud (Two members)	Liberal	Liberal	Liberal
Tewkesbury	Liberal	Liberal	Liberal

=== Wiltshire (15) ===
Constituency	1868	1874	1880
Calne	Liberal	Liberal	Liberal
Chippenham	Conservative	Conservative	Conservative
Cricklade (Two members)	Conservative	Conservative	Conservative
Cricklade (Two members)	Liberal	Conservative	Liberal
Devizes	Conservative	Conservative	Conservative
Malmesbury	Conservative	Conservative	Conservative
Marlborough	Liberal	Liberal	Liberal
Salisbury (Two members)	Liberal	Liberal	Liberal
Salisbury (Two members)	Liberal	Conservative	Liberal
Westbury	Conservative	Liberal	Conservative
Wilton	Liberal	Liberal	Conservative
Wiltshire North (Two members)	Liberal	Conservative	Conservative
Wiltshire North (Two members)	Conservative	Conservative	Conservative
Wiltshire South (Two members)	Liberal	Conservative	Conservative
Wiltshire South (Two members)	Conservative	Conservative	Conservative

== South East England (104) ==
=== Buckinghamshire (8) ===
Constituency	1868	1874	1880
Aylesbury (Two members)	Conservative	Conservative	Liberal
Aylesbury (Two members)	Liberal	Liberal	Liberal
Buckingham	Liberal	Conservative	Liberal
Buckinghamshire (Three members)	Conservative	Conservative	Conservative
Buckinghamshire (Three members)	Conservative	Liberal	Conservative
Buckinghamshire (Three members)	Liberal	Conservative	Liberal
Great Marlow	Conservative	Conservative	Conservative
Wycombe	Liberal	Liberal	Liberal

=== Oxfordshire (7) ===
Constituency	1868	1874	1880
Banbury	Liberal	Liberal	Liberal
Oxford (Two members)	Liberal	Liberal	Liberal
Oxford (Two members)	Liberal	Liberal	Liberal
Oxfordshire (Three members)	Conservative	Conservative	Conservative
Oxfordshire (Three members)	Conservative	Conservative	Liberal
Oxfordshire (Three members)	Liberal	Liberal	Conservative
Woodstock	Conservative	Conservative	Conservative

=== Berkshire (8) ===
Constituency	1868	1874	1880
Abingdon	Conservative	Liberal	Liberal
Berkshire (Three members)	Conservative	Conservative	Conservative
Berkshire (Three members)	Conservative	Conservative	Liberal
Berkshire (Three members)	Liberal	Liberal	Conservative
Reading (Two members)	Liberal	Liberal	Liberal
Reading (Two members)	Liberal	Liberal	Liberal
Wallingford	Conservative	Conservative	Liberal
Windsor	Liberal	Conservative	Conservative

=== Hampshire (16) ===
Constituency	1868	1874	1880
Andover	Liberal	Conservative	Liberal
Christchurch	Liberal	Conservative	Liberal
Hampshire North (Two members)	Conservative	Conservative	Conservative
Hampshire North (Two members)	Conservative	Conservative	Conservative
Hampshire South (Two members)	Liberal	Liberal	Conservative
Hampshire South (Two members)	Conservative	Conservative	Conservative
Isle of Wight	Liberal	Conservative	Liberal
Lymington	Conservative	Conservative	Conservative
Newport	Liberal	Liberal	Liberal
Petersfield	Liberal	Conservative	Liberal
Portsmouth (Two members)	Liberal	Conservative	Conservative
Portsmouth (Two members)	Conservative	Conservative	Conservative
Southampton (Two members)	Conservative	Conservative	Liberal
Southampton (Two members)	Conservative	Liberal	Liberal
Winchester (Two members)	Liberal	Conservative	Liberal
Winchester (Two members)	Conservative	Conservative	Conservative

=== Surrey (11) ===
Constituency	1868	1874	1880
Guildford	Liberal	Conservative	Conservative
Lambeth (Two members)	Liberal	Liberal	Liberal
Lambeth (Two members)	Liberal	Liberal	Liberal
Southwark (Two members)	Liberal	Liberal	Liberal
Southwark (Two members)	Liberal	Conservative	Liberal
Surrey East (Two members)	Liberal	Conservative	Conservative
Surrey East (Two members)	Liberal	Conservative	Conservative
Surrey Mid (Two members)	Conservative	Conservative	Conservative
Surrey Mid (Two members)	Conservative	Conservative	Conservative
Surrey West (Two members)	Liberal	Conservative	Conservative
Surrey West (Two members)	Conservative	Conservative	Conservative

=== Sussex (15) ===
Constituency	1868	1874	1880
Brighton (Two members)	Liberal	Conservative	Liberal
Brighton (Two members)	Liberal	Conservative	Liberal
Chichester	Conservative	Conservative	Conservative
Hastings (Two members)	Liberal	Liberal	Liberal
Hastings (Two members)	Liberal	Liberal	Conservative
Horsham	Liberal	Conservative	Conservative
Lewes	Liberal	Conservative	Conservative
Midhurst	Conservative	Conservative	Conservative
New Shoreham (Two members)	Conservative	Conservative	Conservative
New Shoreham (Two members)	Conservative	Conservative	Conservative
Rye	Conservative	Conservative	Liberal
Sussex East (Two members)	Liberal	Conservative	Conservative
Sussex East (Two members)	Conservative	Conservative	Conservative
Sussex West (Two members)	Conservative	Conservative	Conservative
Sussex West (Two members)	Conservative	Conservative	Conservative

=== Kent (21) ===
Constituency	1868	1874	1880
Canterbury (Two members)	Conservative	Conservative	Conservative
Canterbury (Two members)	Liberal	Conservative	Conservative
Chatham	Liberal	Conservative	Conservative
Dover (Two members)	Conservative	Conservative	Conservative
Dover (Two members)	Liberal	Conservative	Conservative
Gravesend	Liberal	Conservative	Liberal
Greenwich (Two members)	Liberal	Liberal	Conservative
Greenwich (Two members)	Liberal	Conservative	Conservative
Hythe	Liberal	Liberal	Liberal
Kent East (Two members)	Conservative	Conservative	Conservative
Kent East (Two members)	Conservative	Conservative	Conservative
Kent Mid (Two members)	Conservative	Conservative	Conservative
Kent Mid (Two members)	Conservative	Conservative	Conservative
Kent West (Two members)	Conservative	Conservative	Conservative
Kent West (Two members)	Conservative	Conservative	Conservative
Maidstone (Two members)	Liberal	Liberal	Conservative
Maidstone (Two members)	Liberal	Liberal	Conservative
Rochester (Two members)	Liberal	Liberal	Liberal
Rochester (Two members)	Liberal	Liberal	Conservative
Sandwich (Two members)	Liberal	Liberal	Liberal
Sandwich (Two members)	Liberal	Liberal	Liberal

=== Middlesex (18) ===
Constituency	1868	1874	1880
The City of London (Four members)	Liberal	Liberal	Conservative
The City of London (Four members)	Liberal	Conservative	Conservative
The City of London (Four members)	Liberal	Conservative	Conservative
The City of London (Four members)	Conservative	Conservative	Liberal
Chelsea (Two members)	Liberal	Liberal	Liberal
Chelsea (Two members)	Liberal	Conservative	Liberal
Finsbury (Two members)	Liberal	Liberal	Liberal
Finsbury (Two members)	Liberal	Liberal	Liberal
Hackney (Two members)	Liberal	Liberal	Liberal
Hackney (Two members)	Liberal	Liberal	Liberal
Marylebone (Two members)	Liberal	Liberal	Liberal
Marylebone (Two members)	Liberal	Conservative	Liberal
Middlesex (Two members)	Liberal	Conservative	Conservative
Middlesex (Two members)	Conservative	Conservative	Conservative
Tower Hamlets (Two members)	Liberal	Liberal	Conservative
Tower Hamlets (Two members)	Liberal	Conservative	Liberal
Westminster (Two members)	Liberal	Conservative	Conservative
Westminster (Two members)	Conservative	Conservative	Conservative

== East Anglia (45) ==
=== Bedfordshire (4) ===
Constituency	1868	1874	1880
Bedford (Two members)	Liberal	Liberal	Liberal
Bedford (Two members)	Liberal	Conservative	Liberal
Bedfordshire (Two members)	Liberal	Conservative	Liberal
Bedfordshire (Two members)	Conservative	Liberal	Liberal

=== Hertfordshire (4) ===
Constituency	1868	1874	1880
Hertford	Conservative	Conservative	Conservative
Hertfordshire (Three members)	Liberal	Liberal	Liberal
Hertfordshire (Three members)	Conservative	Conservative	Conservative
Hertfordshire (Three members)	Liberal	Conservative	Conservative

=== Huntingdonshire (3) ===
Constituency	1868	1874	1880
Huntingdon	Conservative	Conservative	Conservative
Huntingdonshire (Two members)	Conservative	Conservative	Conservative
Huntingdonshire (Two members)	Conservative	Conservative	Liberal

=== Cambridgeshire (5) ===
Constituency	1868	1874	1880
Cambridge (Two members)	Liberal	Conservative	Liberal
Cambridge (Two members)	Liberal	Conservative	Liberal
Cambridgeshire (Three members)	Conservative	Conservative	Liberal
Cambridgeshire (Three members)	Conservative	Liberal	Conservative
Cambridgeshire (Three members)	Liberal	Conservative	Conservative

=== Norfolk (10) ===
Constituency	1868	1874	1880
King's Lynn (Two members)	Conservative	Conservative	Conservative
King's Lynn (Two members)	Conservative	Conservative	Liberal
Norfolk North (Two members)	Conservative	Conservative	Conservative
Norfolk North (Two members)	Conservative	Conservative	Conservative
Norfolk South (Two members)	Conservative	Conservative	Conservative
Norfolk South (Two members)	Conservative	Conservative	Liberal
Norfolk West (Two members)	Conservative	Conservative	Conservative
Norfolk West (Two members)	Conservative	Conservative	Conservative
Norwich (Two members)	Liberal	Liberal	Liberal
Norwich (Two members)	Conservative	Conservative	Liberal

=== Suffolk (9) ===
Constituency	1868	1874	1880
Bury St Edmunds (Two members)	Liberal	Conservative	Conservative
Bury St Edmunds (Two members)	Conservative	Conservative	Liberal
Eye	Conservative	Conservative	Conservative
Ipswich (Two members)	Liberal	Conservative	Conservative
Ipswich (Two members)	Liberal	Conservative	Liberal
Suffolk East (Two members)	Conservative	Conservative	Conservative
Suffolk East (Two members)	Conservative	Conservative	Conservative
Suffolk West (Two members)	Conservative	Conservative	Conservative
Suffolk West (Two members)	Conservative	Conservative	Conservative

=== Essex (10) ===
Constituency	1868	1874	1880
Colchester (Two members)	Liberal	Conservative	Liberal
Colchester (Two members)	Liberal	Conservative	Liberal
Essex East (Two members)	Conservative	Conservative	Conservative
Essex East (Two members)	Conservative	Conservative	Conservative
Essex South (Two members)	Liberal	Conservative	Conservative
Essex South (Two members)	Liberal	Conservative	Conservative
Essex West (Two members)	Conservative	Conservative	Conservative
Essex West (Two members)	Conservative	Conservative	Conservative
Harwich	Conservative	Conservative	Conservative
Maldon	Liberal	Conservative	Liberal

== East Midlands (48) ==
=== Derbyshire (8) ===
Constituency	1868	1874	1880
Derby (Two members)	Liberal	Liberal	Liberal
Derby (Two members)	Liberal	Liberal	Liberal
Derbyshire East (Two members)	Liberal	Liberal	Liberal
Derbyshire East (Two members)	Liberal	Conservative	Liberal
Derbyshire North (Two members)	Liberal	Liberal	Liberal
Derbyshire North (Two members)	Conservative	Conservative	Liberal
Derbyshire South (Two members)	Conservative	Conservative	Conservative
Derbyshire South (Two members)	Conservative	Liberal	Liberal

=== Nottinghamshire (10) ===
Constituency	1868	1874	1880
East Retford (Two members)	Conservative	Conservative	Liberal
East Retford (Two members)	Liberal	Liberal	Liberal
Newark-on-Trent (Two members)	Liberal	Liberal	Liberal
Newark-on-Trent (Two members)	Liberal	Liberal	Conservative
Nottingham (Two members)	Liberal	Conservative	Liberal
Nottingham (Two members)	Conservative	Conservative	Liberal
Nottinghamshire North (Two members)	Liberal	Conservative	Conservative
Nottinghamshire North (Two members)	Conservative	Conservative	Liberal
Nottinghamshire South (Two members)	Conservative	Conservative	Conservative
Nottinghamshire South (Two members)	Conservative	Conservative	Conservative

=== Lincolnshire (14) ===
Constituency	1868	1874	1880
Boston (Two members)	Conservative	Liberal	Liberal
Boston (Two members)	Conservative	Liberal	Conservative
Grantham (Two members)	Liberal	Liberal	Liberal
Grantham (Two members)	Liberal	Conservative	Liberal
Great Grimsby	Liberal	Conservative	Liberal
Lincoln (Two members)	Liberal	Liberal	Liberal
Lincoln (Two members)	Liberal	Conservative	Liberal
Mid Lincolnshire (Two members)	Liberal	Conservative	Conservative
Mid Lincolnshire (Two members)	Conservative	Conservative	Conservative
Lincolnshire North (Two members)	Liberal	Conservative	Conservative
Lincolnshire North (Two members)	Conservative	Conservative	Liberal
Lincolnshire South (Two members)	Conservative	Conservative	Conservative
Lincolnshire South (Two members)	Conservative	Conservative	Conservative
Stamford	Conservative	Conservative	Liberal

=== Leicestershire (6) ===
Constituency	1868	1874	1880
Leicester (Two members)	Liberal	Liberal	Liberal
Leicester (Two members)	Liberal	Liberal	Liberal
Leicestershire North (Two members)	Conservative	Conservative	Conservative
Leicestershire North (Two members)	Conservative	Conservative	Conservative
Leicestershire South (Two members)	Conservative	Conservative	Conservative
Leicestershire South (Two members)	Conservative	Conservative	Liberal

=== Rutland (2) ===
Constituency	1868	1874	1880
Rutland (Two members)	Conservative	Conservative	Conservative
Rutland (Two members)	Conservative	Conservative	Conservative

=== Northamptonshire (8) ===
Constituency	1868	1874	1880
Northampton (Two members)	Liberal	Liberal	Liberal
Northampton (Two members)	Liberal	Conservative	Liberal
Northamptonshire North (Two members)	Conservative	Conservative	Conservative
Northamptonshire North (Two members)	Conservative	Conservative	Liberal
Northamptonshire South (Two members)	Conservative	Conservative	Conservative
Northamptonshire South (Two members)	Conservative	Conservative	Conservative
Peterborough (Two members)	Liberal	Liberal	Liberal
Peterborough (Two members)	Liberal	Liberal	Liberal

== West Midlands (57) ==
=== Herefordshire (6) ===
Constituency	1868	1874	1880
Hereford (Two members)	Liberal	Conservative	Liberal
Hereford (Two members)	Liberal	Liberal	Liberal
Herefordshire (Three members)	Conservative	Conservative	Conservative
Herefordshire (Three members)	Liberal	Liberal	Liberal
Herefordshire (Three members)	Conservative	Conservative	Liberal
Leominster	Conservative	Conservative	Conservative

=== Worcestershire (11) ===
Constituency	1868	1874	1880
Bewdley	Conservative	Liberal	Liberal
Droitwich	Conservative	Liberal	Liberal
Dudley	Liberal	Liberal	Liberal
Evesham	Conservative	Conservative	Liberal
Kidderminster	Liberal	Conservative	Liberal
Worcester (Two members)	Liberal	Liberal	Liberal
Worcester (Two members)	Conservative	Liberal	Liberal
Worcestershire East (Two members)	Liberal	Conservative	Liberal
Worcestershire East (Two members)	Conservative	Conservative	Liberal
Worcestershire West (Two members)	Conservative	Conservative	Conservative
Worcestershire West (Two members)	Conservative	Conservative	Conservative

=== Warwickshire (11) ===
Constituency	1868	1874	1880
Birmingham (Three members)	Liberal	Liberal	Liberal
Birmingham (Three members)	Liberal	Liberal	Liberal
Birmingham (Three members)	Liberal	Liberal	Liberal
Coventry (Two members)	Conservative	Conservative	Liberal
Coventry (Two members)	Conservative	Liberal	Liberal
Warwick (Two members)	Liberal	Liberal	Liberal
Warwick (Two members)	Conservative	Conservative	Conservative
Warwickshire North (Two members)	Conservative	Conservative	Conservative
Warwickshire North (Two members)	Conservative	Conservative	Conservative
Warwickshire South (Two members)	Conservative	Conservative	Conservative
Warwickshire South (Two members)	Conservative	Conservative	Liberal

=== Shropshire (10) ===
Constituency	1868	1874	1880
Bridgnorth	Conservative	Conservative	Conservative
Ludlow	Conservative	Conservative	Conservative
Shrewsbury (Two members)	Liberal	Liberal	Liberal
Shrewsbury (Two members)	Conservative	Liberal	Liberal
Shropshire North (Two members)	Conservative	Conservative	Conservative
Shropshire North (Two members)	Conservative	Conservative	Conservative
Shropshire South (Two members)	Conservative	Conservative	Conservative
Shropshire South (Two members)	Conservative	Conservative	Conservative
Wenlock (Two members)	Conservative	Liberal	Liberal
Wenlock (Two members)	Liberal	Conservative	Conservative

=== Staffordshire (19) ===
Constituency	1868	1874	1880
Lichfield	Conservative	Conservative	Conservative
Newcastle-under-Lyme (Two members)	Liberal	Liberal	Liberal
Newcastle-under-Lyme (Two members)	Conservative	Conservative	Conservative
Stafford (Two members)	Conservative	Conservative	Conservative
Stafford (Two members)	Liberal	Liberal	Liberal
Staffordshire East (Two members)	Liberal	Liberal	Liberal
Staffordshire East (Two members)	Liberal	Conservative	Liberal
Staffordshire North (Two members)	Conservative	Conservative	Liberal
Staffordshire North (Two members)	Liberal	Conservative	Conservative
Staffordshire West (Two members)	Conservative	Conservative	Conservative
Staffordshire West (Two members)	Conservative	Conservative	Conservative
Stoke-upon-Trent (Two members)	Liberal	Liberal	Liberal
Stoke-upon-Trent (Two members)	Liberal	Conservative	Liberal
Tamworth (Also in Warwickshire) (Two members)	Liberal	Liberal	Liberal
Tamworth (Also in Warwickshire) (Two members)	Liberal	Conservative	Liberal
Walsall	Liberal	Liberal	Liberal
Wednesbury	Liberal	Liberal	Liberal
Wolverhampton (Two members)	Liberal	Liberal	Liberal
Wolverhampton (Two members)	Liberal	Liberal	Liberal

== North West England (57) ==
=== Cheshire (14) ===
Constituency	1868	1874	1880
Birkenhead	Conservative	Conservative	Conservative
Cheshire East (Two members)	Conservative	Conservative	Conservative
Cheshire East (Two members)	Conservative	Conservative	Conservative
Cheshire Mid (Two members)	Conservative	Conservative	Conservative
Cheshire Mid (Two members)	Conservative	Conservative	Conservative
Cheshire West (Two members)	Conservative	Conservative	Conservative
Cheshire West (Two members)	Conservative	Conservative	Conservative
Chester (Two members)	Liberal	Conservative	Liberal
Chester (Two members)	Conservative	Liberal	Liberal
Macclesfield (Two members)	Liberal	Liberal	Liberal
Macclesfield (Two members)	Liberal	Liberal	Liberal
Stalybridge	Conservative	Conservative	Liberal
Stockport (Two members)	Liberal	Liberal	Liberal
Stockport (Two members)	Conservative	Liberal	Liberal

=== Lancashire (32) ===
Constituency	1868	1874	1880
Ashton-under-Lyne	Conservative	Conservative	Liberal
Blackburn (Two members)	Conservative	Conservative	Liberal
Blackburn (Two members)	Conservative	Liberal	Conservative
Bolton (Two members)	Conservative	Conservative	Liberal
Bolton (Two members)	Conservative	Liberal	Liberal
Burnley	Liberal	Liberal	Liberal
Bury	Liberal	Liberal	Liberal
Clitheroe	Conservative	Conservative	Liberal
Lancashire North (Two members)	Conservative	Conservative	Conservative
Lancashire North (Two members)	Conservative	Conservative	Conservative
Lancashire North East (Two members)	Conservative	Conservative	Liberal
Lancashire North East (Two members)	Conservative	Conservative	Liberal
Lancashire South East (Two members)	Conservative	Conservative	Liberal
Lancashire South East (Two members)	Conservative	Conservative	Liberal
Lancashire South West (Two members)	Conservative	Conservative	Conservative
Lancashire South West (Two members)	Conservative	Conservative	Conservative
Liverpool (Three members)	Conservative	Conservative	Conservative
Liverpool (Three members)	Conservative	Liberal	Conservative
Liverpool (Three members)	Liberal	Conservative	Liberal
Manchester (Three members)	Liberal	Liberal	Conservative
Manchester (Three members)	Liberal	Conservative	Liberal
Manchester (Three members)	Conservative	Conservative	Liberal
Oldham (Two members)	Liberal	Conservative	Liberal
Oldham (Two members)	Liberal	Conservative	Liberal
Preston (Two members)	Conservative	Conservative	Conservative
Preston (Two members)	Conservative	Conservative	Conservative
Rochdale	Liberal	Liberal	Liberal
Salford (Two members)	Conservative	Conservative	Liberal
Salford (Two members)	Conservative	Conservative	Liberal
Warrington	Liberal	Conservative	Liberal
Wigan (Two members)	Liberal	Conservative	Conservative
Wigan (Two members)	Liberal	Conservative	Conservative

=== Cumberland (8) ===
Constituency	1868	1874	1880
Carlisle (Two members)	Liberal	Liberal	Liberal
Carlisle (Two members)	Liberal	Liberal	Liberal
Cockermouth	Liberal	Liberal	Liberal
Cumberland East (Two members)	Liberal	Liberal	Liberal
Cumberland East (Two members)	Conservative	Conservative	Conservative
Cumberland West (Two members)	Conservative	Conservative	Conservative
Cumberland West (Two members)	Conservative	Conservative	Liberal
Whitehaven	Conservative	Conservative	Conservative

=== Westmorland (3) ===
Constituency	1868	1874	1880
Kendal	Liberal	Liberal	Liberal
Westmorland (Two members)	Conservative	Conservative	Conservative
Westmorland (Two members)	Conservative	Conservative	Conservative

== Yorkshire (40) ==
=== York (2) ===
Constituency	1868	1874	1880
York (Two members)	Conservative	Conservative	Liberal
York (Two members)	Liberal	Liberal	Liberal

=== Yorkshire, North Riding (10) ===
Constituency	1868	1874	1880
Malton (also in East Riding)	Liberal	Liberal	Liberal
Middlesbrough	Liberal	Liberal	Liberal
Northallerton	Conservative	Conservative	Conservative
North Riding of Yorkshire (Two members)	Liberal	Liberal	Liberal
North Riding of Yorkshire (Two members)	Conservative	Conservative	Conservative
Richmond	Liberal	Liberal	Liberal
Scarborough (Two members)	Liberal	Liberal	Liberal
Scarborough (Two members)	Liberal	Conservative	Liberal
Thirsk	Conservative	Conservative	Conservative
Whitby	Liberal	Liberal	Liberal

=== Yorkshire, West Riding (22) ===
Constituency	1868	1874	1880
Bradford (Two members)	Liberal	Liberal	Liberal
Bradford (Two members)	Liberal	Liberal	Liberal
Dewsbury	Liberal	Liberal	Liberal
Halifax (Two members)	Liberal	Liberal	Liberal
Halifax (Two members)	Liberal	Liberal	Liberal
Huddersfield	Liberal	Liberal	Liberal
Knaresborough	Liberal	Conservative	Liberal
Leeds (Three members)	Liberal	Liberal	Liberal
Leeds (Three members)	Liberal	Conservative	Liberal
Leeds (Three members)	Conservative	Conservative	Conservative
Pontefract (Two members)	Liberal	Liberal	Liberal
Pontefract (Two members)	Conservative	Conservative	Liberal
Ripon	Liberal	Liberal	Liberal
Sheffield (Two members)	Liberal	Liberal	Liberal
Sheffield (Two members)	Liberal	Liberal	Conservative
Wakefield	Liberal	Conservative	Liberal
West Riding of Yorkshire, East (Two members)	Conservative	Conservative	Liberal
West Riding of Yorkshire, East (Two members)	Conservative	Conservative	Liberal
West Riding of Yorkshire, North (Two members)	Liberal	Liberal	Liberal
West Riding of Yorkshire, North (Two members)	Liberal	Liberal	Liberal
West Riding of Yorkshire, South (Two members)	Liberal	Conservative	Liberal
West Riding of Yorkshire, South (Two members)	Liberal	Conservative	Liberal

=== Yorkshire, East Riding (6) ===
Constituency	1868	1874	1880
Beverley (Two members)	Conservative	Disenfranchised for corruption in 1870	
Beverley (Two members)	Conservative	Disenfranchised for corruption in 1870	
East Riding of Yorkshire (Two members)	Conservative	Conservative	Conservative
East Riding of Yorkshire (Two members)	Conservative	Conservative	Conservative
Kingston upon Hull (Two members)	Liberal	Liberal	Liberal
Kingston upon Hull (Two members)	Liberal	Liberal	Liberal

== North East England (23) ==
=== Northumberland (10) ===
Constituency	1868	1874	1880
Berwick-upon-Tweed (Two members)	Liberal	Liberal	Liberal
Berwick-upon-Tweed (Two members)	Liberal	Conservative	Liberal
Morpeth	Liberal	Liberal	Liberal
Newcastle-upon-Tyne (Two members)	Liberal	Liberal	Liberal
Newcastle-upon-Tyne (Two members)	Liberal	Conservative	Liberal
Northumberland North (Two members)	Conservative	Conservative	Conservative
Northumberland North (Two members)	Conservative	Conservative	Conservative
Northumberland South (Two members)	Liberal	Liberal	Liberal
Northumberland South (Two members)	Conservative	Conservative	Liberal
Tynemouth and North Shields	Liberal	Liberal	Liberal

=== Durham (13) ===
Constituency	1868	1874	1880
Darlington	Liberal	Liberal	Liberal
Durham City (Two members)	Liberal	Liberal	Liberal
Durham City (Two members)	Liberal	Liberal	Liberal
Durham North (Two members)	Liberal	Liberal	Liberal
Durham North (Two members)	Conservative	Liberal	Liberal
Durham South (Two members)	Liberal	Liberal	Liberal
Durham South (Two members)	Liberal	Liberal	Liberal
Gateshead	Liberal	Liberal	Liberal
The Hartlepools	Conservative	Liberal	Liberal
South Shields	Liberal	Liberal	Liberal
Stockton	Liberal	Liberal	Liberal
Sunderland (Two members)	Liberal	Liberal	Liberal
Sunderland (Two members)	Liberal	Liberal	Liberal

== Wales (33) ==
=== Anglesey (2) ===
Constituency	1868	1874	1880
Anglesey	Liberal	Liberal	Liberal
Beaumaris Boroughs	Liberal	Liberal	Liberal

=== Caernarvonshire (2) ===
Constituency	1868	1874	1880
Caernarvon Boroughs	Liberal	Liberal	Liberal
Caernarvonshire	Liberal	Conservative	Liberal

=== Denbighshire (3) ===
Constituency	1868	1874	1880
Denbigh Boroughs	Liberal	Liberal	Liberal
Denbighshire (Two members)	Liberal	Liberal	Liberal
Denbighshire (Two members)	Conservative	Conservative	Conservative

=== Flintshire (2) ===
Constituency	1868	1874	1880
Flint Boroughs	Liberal	Liberal	Liberal
Flintshire	Liberal	Liberal	Liberal

=== Merionethshire (1) ===
Constituency	1868	1874	1880
Merionethshire	Liberal	Liberal	Liberal

=== Montgomeryshire (2) ===
Constituency	1868	1874	1880
Montgomery Boroughs	Liberal	Liberal	Liberal
Montgomeryshire	Conservative	Conservative	Liberal

=== Cardiganshire (2) ===
Constituency	1868	1874	1880
Cardigan District	Liberal	Liberal	Liberal
Cardiganshire	Liberal	Conservative	Liberal

=== Pembrokeshire (3) ===
Constituency	1868	1874	1880
Haverfordwest Boroughs	Liberal	Liberal	Liberal
Pembroke Boroughs	Conservative	Liberal	Liberal
Pembrokeshire	Conservative	Conservative	Liberal

=== Carmarthenshire (3) ===
Constituency	1868	1874	1880
Carmarthen	Liberal	Conservative	Liberal
Carmarthenshire (Two members)	Liberal	Conservative	Conservative
Carmarthenshire (Two members)	Conservative	Conservative	Liberal

=== Radnorshire (2) ===
Constituency	1868	1874	1880
Radnor Boroughs	Liberal	Liberal	Liberal
Radnorshire	Conservative	Conservative	Liberal

=== Breconshire (2) ===
Constituency	1868	1874	1880
Brecon	Conservative	Conservative	Liberal
Breconshire	Conservative	Conservative	Liberal

=== Glamorganshire (6) ===
Constituency	1868	1874	1880
Cardiff District	Liberal	Liberal	Liberal
Glamorganshire (Two members)	Liberal	Liberal	Liberal
Glamorganshire (Two members)	Liberal	Liberal	Liberal
Swansea District	Liberal	Liberal	Liberal
Merthyr Tydfil (Two members)	Liberal	Liberal	Liberal
Merthyr Tydfil (Two members)	Liberal	Liberal	Liberal

=== Monmouthshire (3) ===
Constituency	1868	1874	1880
Monmouth Boroughs	Liberal	Conservative	Liberal
Monmouthshire (Two members)	Conservative	Conservative	Conservative
Monmouthshire (Two members)	Conservative	Conservative	Conservative

== Scotland (58) ==
=== Orkney and Shetland (1) ===
Constituency	1868	1874	1880
Orkney and Shetland	Liberal	Liberal	Liberal

=== Caithness (2) ===
Constituency	1868	1874	1880
Caithness	Liberal	Liberal	Liberal
Wick Burghs	Liberal	Liberal	Liberal

=== Sutherland (1) ===
Constituency	1868	1874	1880
Sutherland	Liberal	Liberal	Liberal

=== Ross and Cromarty (1) ===
Constituency	1868	1874	1880
Ross and Cromarty	Liberal	Liberal	Liberal

=== Invernessshire (2) ===
Constituency	1868	1874	1880
Inverness Burghs	Liberal	Liberal	Liberal
Inverness-shire	Conservative	Conservative	Conservative

=== Banffshire (1) ===
Constituency	1868	1874	1880
Banffshire	Liberal	Liberal	Liberal

=== Elginshire and Nairnshire (2) ===
Constituency	1868	1874	1880
Elgin Burghs	Liberal	Liberal	Liberal
Elginshire and Nairnshire	Conservative	Liberal	Liberal

=== Aberdeenshire (3) ===
Constituency	1868	1874	1880
Aberdeen	Liberal	Liberal	Liberal
Aberdeenshire East	Liberal	Liberal	Liberal
Aberdeenshire West	Liberal	Liberal	Liberal

=== Kincardineshire (1) ===
Constituency	1868	1874	1880
Kincardineshire	Liberal	Liberal	Liberal

=== Forfarshire (4) ===
Constituency	1868	1874	1880
Forfarshire	Liberal	Liberal	Liberal
Montrose Burghs	Liberal	Liberal	Liberal
Dundee (Two members)	Liberal	Liberal	Liberal
Dundee (Two members)	Liberal	Liberal	Liberal

=== Perthshire (2) ===
Constituency	1868	1874	1880
Perth	Liberal	Liberal	Liberal
Perthshire	Liberal	Conservative	Liberal

=== Clackmannanshire and Kinrossshire (1) ===
Constituency	1868	1874	1880
Clackmannanshire and Kinross-shire	Liberal	Liberal	Liberal

=== Fife (3) ===
Constituency	1868	1874	1880
Fife	Liberal	Liberal	Liberal
Kirkcaldy District of Burghs	Liberal	Liberal	Liberal
St Andrews Burghs	Liberal	Liberal	Liberal

=== Argyllshire (1) ===
Constituency	1868	1874	1880
Argyllshire	Liberal	Liberal	Liberal

=== Dunbartonshire (1) ===
Constituency	1868	1874	1880
Dunbartonshire	Conservative	Conservative	Conservative

=== Renfrewshire (3) ===
Constituency	1868	1874	1880
Greenock	Liberal	Liberal	Liberal
Paisley	Liberal	Liberal	Liberal
Renfrewshire	Liberal	Liberal	Liberal

=== Stirlingshire (3) ===
Constituency	1868	1874	1880
Falkirk Burghs	Liberal	Liberal	Liberal
Stirling Burghs	Liberal	Liberal	Liberal
Stirlingshire	Liberal	Conservative	Liberal

=== Ayrshire (4) ===
Constituency	1868	1874	1880
Ayr Burghs	Liberal	Conservative	Liberal
Kilmarnock Burghs	Liberal	Liberal	Liberal
Ayrshire North	Liberal	Conservative	Conservative
Ayrshire South	Liberal	Conservative	Conservative

=== Buteshire (1) ===
Constituency	1868	1874	1880
Buteshire	Conservative	Conservative	Liberal

=== Lanarkshire (5) ===
Constituency	1868	1874	1880
Glasgow (Three members)	Liberal	Liberal	Liberal
Glasgow (Three members)	Liberal	Conservative	Liberal
Glasgow (Three members)	Liberal	Liberal	Liberal
Lanarkshire North	Liberal	Liberal	Liberal
Lanarkshire South	Liberal	Conservative	Liberal

=== Linlithgowshire (1) ===
Constituency	1868	1874	1880
Linlithgowshire	Liberal	Liberal	Liberal

=== Edinburghshire (4) ===
Constituency	1868	1874	1880
Edinburgh (Two members)	Liberal	Liberal	Liberal
Edinburgh (Two members)	Liberal	Liberal	Liberal
Leith Burghs	Liberal	Liberal	Liberal
Edinburghshire	Liberal	Conservative	Liberal

=== Haddingtonshire (2) ===
Constituency	1868	1874	1880
Haddington Burghs	Liberal	Liberal	Liberal
Haddingtonshire	Conservative	Conservative	Conservative

=== Dumfriesshire (2) ===
Constituency	1868	1874	1880
Dumfries Burghs	Liberal	Liberal	Liberal
Dumfriesshire	Liberal	Conservative	Liberal

=== Wigtownshire (2) ===
Constituency	1868	1874	1880
Wigtown Burghs	Liberal	Conservative	Liberal
Wigtownshire	Conservative	Conservative	Conservative

=== Kirkcudbright Stewartry (1) ===
Constituency	1868	1874	1880
Kirkcudbright Stewartry	Liberal	Liberal	Liberal

=== Peeblesshire and Selkirkshire (1) ===
Constituency	1868	1874	1880
Peeblesshire and Selkirkshire	Conservative	Conservative	Liberal

=== Roxburghshire (2) ===
Constituency	1868	1874	1880
Hawick Burghs	Liberal	Liberal	Liberal
Roxburghshire	Liberal	Conservative	Liberal

=== Berwickshire (1) ===
Constituency	1868	1874	1880
Berwickshire	Liberal	Conservative	Liberal

== Ulster (29) ==
=== Antrim (6) ===
Constituency	1868	1874	1880
Antrim (Two members)	Conservative	Conservative	Conservative
Antrim (Two members)	Conservative	Conservative	Conservative
Belfast (Two members)	Conservative	Conservative	Conservative
Belfast (Two members)	Liberal	Conservative	Conservative
Carrickfergus	Conservative	Conservative	Conservative
Lisburn	Conservative	Conservative	Conservative

=== Londonderry (4) ===
Constituency	1868	1874	1880
Coleraine	Conservative	Liberal	Conservative
Londonderry City	Liberal	Conservative	Conservative
County Londonderry (Two members)	Conservative	Liberal	Liberal
County Londonderry (Two members)	Conservative	Liberal	Liberal

=== Tyrone (3) ===
Constituency	1868	1874	1880
Dungannon	Conservative	Liberal	Liberal
Tyrone (Two members)	Conservative	Conservative	Liberal
Tyrone (Two members)	Conservative	Conservative	Conservative

=== Armagh (4) ===
Constituency	1868	1874	1880
Armagh	Conservative	Conservative	Conservative
County Armagh (Two members)	Conservative	Conservative	Conservative
County Armagh (Two members)	Conservative	Conservative	Liberal
Newry (Also in Down)	Liberal	Liberal	Conservative

=== Down (3) ===
Constituency	1868	1874	1880
Down (Two members)	Conservative	Liberal	Conservative
Down (Two members)	Conservative	Conservative	Conservative
Downpatrick	Conservative	Conservative	Conservative

=== Fermanagh (3) ===
Constituency	1868	1874	1880
Enniskillen	Conservative	Conservative	Conservative
Fermanagh (Two members)	Conservative	Conservative	Conservative
Fermanagh (Two members)	Conservative	Conservative	Conservative

=== Donegal (2) ===
Constituency	1868	1874	1880
Donegal (Two members)	Conservative	Conservative	Liberal
Donegal (Two members)	Conservative	Conservative	Liberal

=== Monaghan (2) ===
Constituency	1868	1874	1880
Monaghan (Two members)	Conservative	Conservative	Liberal
Monaghan (Two members)	Conservative	Conservative	Liberal

=== Cavan (2) ===
Constituency	1868	1874	1880
Cavan (Two members)	Conservative	Home Rule	Home Rule
Cavan (Two members)	Liberal	Home Rule	Home Rule

== Connacht (14) ==
=== Galway (4) ===
Constituency	1868	1874	1880
Galway Borough (Two members)	Liberal	Home Rule	Home Rule
Galway Borough (Two members)	Liberal	Home Rule	Home Rule
County Galway (Two members)	Liberal	Home Rule	Home Rule
County Galway (Two members)	Liberal	Home Rule	Home Rule

=== Leitrim (2) ===
Constituency	1868	1874	1880
Leitrim (Two members)	Conservative	Conservative	Home Rule
Leitrim (Two members)	Liberal	Home Rule	Conservative

=== Roscommon (3) ===
Constituency	1868	1874	1880
Athlone (Also in Westmeath)	Liberal	Home Rule	Liberal
Roscommon (Two members)	Liberal	Home Rule	Home Rule
Roscommon (Two members)	Liberal	Home Rule	Home Rule

=== Sligo (3) ===
Constituency	1868	1874	1880
Sligo	Conservative	Disenfranchised in 1870	
County Sligo (Two members)	Conservative	Conservative	Home Rule
County Sligo (Two members)	Liberal	Home Rule	Home Rule

=== Mayo (2) ===
Constituency	1868	1874	1880
Mayo (Two members)	Conservative	Home Rule	Home Rule
Mayo (Two members)	Liberal	Home Rule	Home Rule

== Leinster (33) ==
=== Longford (2) ===
Constituency	1868	1874	1880
County Longford (Two members)	Liberal	Home Rule	Home Rule
County Longford (Two members)	Liberal	Home Rule	Home Rule

=== Louth (4) ===
Constituency	1868	1874	1880
Drogheda	Liberal	Home Rule	Home Rule
Dundalk	Liberal	Home Rule	Liberal
County Louth (Two members)	Liberal	Home Rule	Home Rule
County Louth (Two members)	Liberal	Home Rule	Home Rule

=== King's County (2) ===
Constituency	1868	1874	1880
King's County (Two members)	Liberal	Home Rule	Home Rule
King's County (Two members)	Liberal	Home Rule	Home Rule

=== Queen's County (3) ===
Constituency	1868	1874	1880
Portarlington (Also in King's County)	Conservative	Conservative	Conservative
Queen's County (Two members)	Liberal	Home Rule	Home Rule
Queen's County (Two members)	Liberal	Home Rule	Home Rule

=== Meath (2) ===
Constituency	1868	1874	1880
Meath (Two members)	Liberal	Home Rule	Home Rule
Meath (Two members)	Liberal	Home Rule	Home Rule

=== Westmeath (2) ===
Constituency	1868	1874	1880
Westmeath (Two members)	Liberal	Home Rule	Home Rule
Westmeath (Two members)	Liberal	Home Rule	Home Rule

=== Carlow (3) ===
Constituency	1868	1874	1880
Carlow	Liberal	Home Rule	Home Rule
County Carlow (Two members)	Conservative	Conservative	Home Rule
County Carlow (Two members)	Conservative	Conservative	Home Rule

=== Dublin (4) ===
Constituency	1868	1874	1880
Dublin (Two members)	Liberal	Conservative	Home Rule
Dublin (Two members)	Conservative	Home Rule	Liberal
County Dublin (Two members)	Conservative	Conservative	Conservative
County Dublin (Two members)	Conservative	Conservative	Conservative

=== Wicklow (2) ===
Constituency	1868	1874	1880
Wicklow (Two members)	Conservative	Conservative	Home Rule
Wicklow (Two members)	Liberal	Home Rule	Home Rule

=== Kildare (2) ===
Constituency	1868	1874	1880
Kildare (Two members)	Liberal	Liberal	Home Rule
Kildare (Two members)	Liberal	Home Rule	Home Rule

=== Kilkenny (3) ===
Constituency	1868	1874	1880
Kilkenny City	Liberal	Home Rule	Home Rule
County Kilkenny (Two members)	Liberal	Home Rule	Home Rule
County Kilkenny (Two members)	Liberal	Home Rule	Home Rule

=== Wexford (4) ===
Constituency	1868	1874	1880
New Ross	Liberal	Home Rule	Home Rule
Wexford	Liberal	Home Rule	Home Rule
County Wexford (Two members)	Liberal	Home Rule	Home Rule
County Wexford (Two members)	Liberal	Home Rule	Home Rule

== Munster (27) ==
=== Clare (3) ===
Constituency	1868	1874	1880
Clare (Two members)	Conservative	Home Rule	Home Rule
Clare (Two members)	Liberal	Home Rule	Home Rule
Ennis	Liberal	Home Rule	Home Rule

=== Tipperary (4) ===
Constituency	1868	1874	1880
Cashel	Liberal	Disenfranchised in 1870	
Clonmel	Liberal	Home Rule	Home Rule
Tipperary (Two members)	Liberal	Home Rule	Home Rule
Tipperary (Two members)	Liberal	Home Rule	Home Rule

=== Limerick (4) ===
Constituency	1868	1874	1880
Limerick City (Two members)	Liberal	Home Rule	Home Rule
Limerick City (Two members)	Liberal	Home Rule	Home Rule
County Limerick (Two members)	Liberal	Home Rule	Home Rule
County Limerick (Two members)	Liberal	Home Rule	Home Rule

=== Kerry (3) ===
Constituency	1868	1874	1880
Kerry (Two members)	Liberal	Liberal	Home Rule
Kerry (Two members)	Liberal	Home Rule	Liberal
Tralee	Liberal	Liberal	Home Rule

=== Cork (8) ===
Constituency	1868	1874	1880
Bandon	Liberal	Liberal	Conservative
Cork City (Two members)	Liberal	Home Rule	Home Rule
Cork City (Two members)	Liberal	Home Rule	Home Rule
County Cork (Two members)	Liberal	Liberal	Liberal
County Cork (Two members)	Liberal	Home Rule	Home Rule
Kinsale	Liberal	Home Rule	Home Rule
Mallow	Liberal	Home Rule	Liberal
Youghal	Liberal	Home Rule	Home Rule

=== Waterford (5) ===
Constituency	1868	1874	1880
Dungarvan	Liberal	Home Rule	Home Rule
Waterford City (Two members)	Liberal	Home Rule	Home Rule
Waterford City (Two members)	Liberal	Home Rule	Home Rule
County Waterford (Two members)	Liberal	Conservative	Liberal
County Waterford (Two members)	Liberal	Home Rule	Home Rule

== Universities (9) ==
Constituency	1868	1874	1880
Cambridge University (Two members)	Conservative	Conservative	Conservative
Cambridge University (Two members)	Conservative	Conservative	Conservative
Dublin University (Two members)	Conservative	Conservative	Conservative
Dublin University (Two members)	Conservative	Conservative	Conservative
Edinburgh and St Andrews Universities	Liberal	Liberal	Liberal
Glasgow and Aberdeen Universities	Liberal	Conservative	Conservative
London University	Liberal	Liberal	Liberal
Oxford University (Two members)	Conservative	Conservative	Conservative
Oxford University (Two members)	Conservative	Conservative	Conservative
