= Henry Thomas (MP) =

Politician (19th century)

Henry Thomas (1785 – 1858) was a British politician.

Thomas served in the British Army in the Peninsula War, then in Canada and India, rising to become a lieutenant-colonel. At the 1835 UK general election, he stood in Kinsale for the Conservative Party, winning the seat. He stood again at the 1837 UK general election, where he was defeated, but in April 1838 he was seated on petition. He stood down at the 1841 UK general election.

Parliament of the United Kingdom
Preceded by Sampson Stawell	Member of Parliament for Kinsale; 1835–1837	Succeeded by Pierce Mahony
Preceded by Pierce Mahony	Member of Parliament for Kinsale; 1838–1841	Succeeded by William Henry Watson
