= John Isaac Heard =

Irish Whig politician

John Isaac Heard MP

Member of Parliament for Kinsale
- In office 12 February 1852 – 7 May 1859
- Preceded by: Benjamin Hawes
- Succeeded by: John Arnott

Personal details
- Born: 1787 Kinsale, County Cork, Ireland
- Died: 1 September 1862 (aged 74–75) Kinsale, County Cork, Ireland
- Party: Whig
- Spouse: Mary Wilkes (m. 1808)
- Parent: John Heard
- Education: Peterhouse, Cambridge

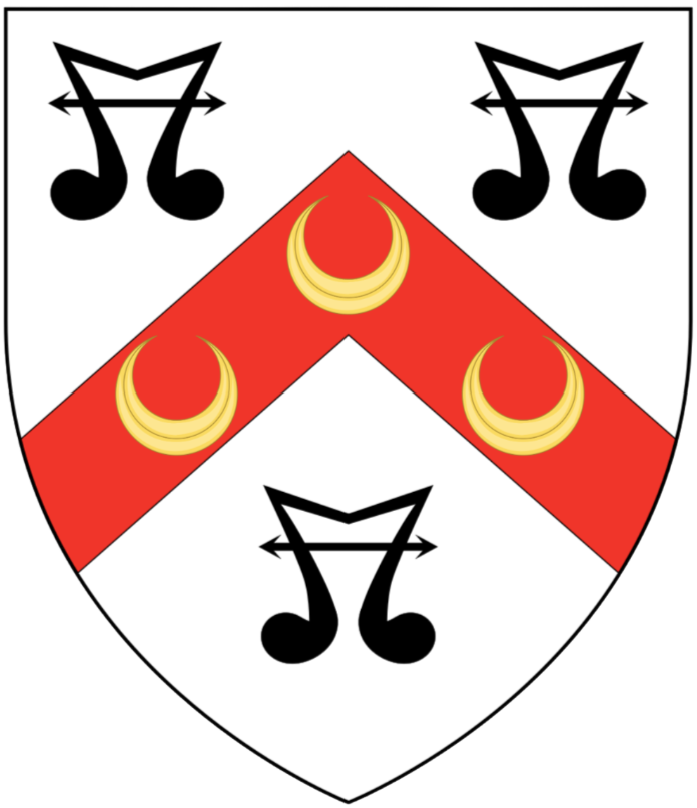
Arms of Heard of Kinsale Escutcheon: Argent, on a chevron gules between three water bougets sable as many crescents or. Crest: A demi-antelope ppr., ducally gorged or, charged on the shoulder with a water bouget as in the arms. Motto: Audior ("I Heard") or Toujours fidèle ("Always faithful")

John Isaac Heard MP (1787 – 1 September 1862) was an Irish Whig politician. He sat in the House of Commons of the United Kingdom from 1852 to 1859.

Born in Kinsale, County Cork, Heard was the son of John Heard and Rachel, daughter of Isaac Servatt. He was admitted to Peterhouse, Cambridge in 1804, graduating with a Bachelor of Arts in 1808. He married Mary Wilkes, daughter of Hope Wilkes, in 1808, and they had six children: Joh Wilkes Heard (1811–1825); Robert Heard (born 1815); Martha Ann Heard (1809–1834); Catherine Jane Heard (born 1810); Mary Heard (born 1812); and, Eleanor (1814–1840).

He later became a Justice of the peace and Deputy Lieutenant and, in 1839, High Sheriff of County Cork.

He was elected Whig Member of Parliament (MP) for Kinsale at a by-election in 1852—caused by the resignation of Benjamin Hawes—and held the seat until 1859, when he did not seek re-election.

Parliament of the United Kingdom
Preceded by Benjamin Hawes	Member of Parliament for Kinsale; 1852–1859	Succeeded by John Arnott
uk
Preceded by Richard White	High Sheriff of County Cork; 1839	Succeeded by John Capel Fitzgerald
