= Annie Colthurst =

Irish painter

- Born: Annie Jane Cape Colthurst; 1855; Ireland
- Died: 1930 (aged 74–75); London, England
- Known for: painting

Annie Colthurst (1855-1930) was an Irish painter.

== Life ==
Annie Jane Cape Colthurst was born in Ireland in 1855. Her father was Sir George Conway Colthurst. Colthurst studied under Eugene Carrière in France, and in London. She lived much of her life in London with her sister, Julie, where they were known for their musical evenings. In 1912, she applied to become a member of the United Irishwomen (later the Irish Countrywomen's Association).

Colthurst painted still life, cityscapes, landscapes, subject paintings, and portraits. She was a prolific artist, exhibiting at Baillie Gallery, Royal Academy, Walker Art Gallery, Paris Salon, Royal Society of Portrait Painters, London Salon, and the Royal Hibernian Academy (RHA). She exhibited for the first time with the RHA in 1902, going on to show over 40 paintings. Her painting, The Wake or The Irish Wake, was shown as part of the 1904 exhibition of Irish painters at the Guildhall of the Corporation of London, organised by Hugh Lane.

She died in London in 1930. Hugely wealthy, she left a large estate, likely due to the legacy from her father.

The Hugh Lane Gallery, Dublin hold two works by her, including The Wake.

== Selected works ==
- Kitty O'Callaghan, the flowerseller (1908)
- Votes for Women (1913)
