= Pierce Mahony (Kinsale MP) =

Irish politician

Pierce Mahony (19 December 1792 – 18 February 1853) was an Irish Repeal politician and Member of Parliament (MP) in the House of Commons of the United Kingdom of Great Britain and Ireland.

He was a close associate of Daniel O'Connell, and was elected for the Kinsale constituency at 1837 general election but unseated on petition in April 1838.

Parliament of the United Kingdom
Preceded by Henry Thomas	Member of Parliament for Kinsale; 1837–1838	Succeeded by Henry Thomas
