= Sir George Colthurst, 5th Baronet =

Irish landowner and politician

Sir George Colthurst, 5th Baronet (1824 – 24 September 1878), was an Irish landowner and politician.

He was a Member of Parliament for Kinsale, Ireland, from 1863 to 1874 as a Liberal-Conservative. Colthurst was also grand juror and magistrate of Cork County and High Sheriff of County Cork in 1850. He was the fifth of the Colthurst baronets, eldest son of Sir Nicholas Colthurst, 4th Baronet and Elizabeth Vesey.

Colthurst died at Buxton, Derbyshire on 24 September 1878 where he had gone to recover from gout, he was aged 54.

One of his children was the artist, Annie Colthurst.

== See also ==
- Blarney Castle

Baronetage of Ireland
| Preceded by Nicholas Colthurst | Baronet (of Ardum); 1829–1878 | Succeeded by George Colthurst |
