= Kinsale (UK Parliament constituency) =

UK parliamentary constituency in Ireland, 1801–1885

- Former borough constituency for the House of Commons
- County: County Cork
- Borough: Kinsale

1801–1885
- Seats: 1
- Created from: Kinsale (IHC)
- Replaced by: South East Cork

Kinsale was a United Kingdom Parliament constituency in Ireland, returning one MP. It was an original constituency represented in Parliament when the Union of Great Britain and Ireland took effect on 1 January 1801.

It was disfranchised under the Redistribution of Seats Act 1885, which took effect at the 1885 general election.

== Boundaries ==
This constituency was the parliamentary borough of Kinsale in County Cork. In December 1831, boundary commissioners proposed boundaries for the borough. It was defined by the Parliamentary Boundaries (Ireland) Act 1832 as:

From the Point on the North-east of the Town at which the new Cork Road crosses the old Cork Road, in a straight Line to the Northern Extremity of Mr. Hurley's Stables; thence in a straight Line to the Point at which the Road to Bandon River leaves the Road to Bandon; thence in a straight Line to the Point at which the Blindgate Road meets the Compass Hill Road; thence in a straight Line over Compass Hill to the Westernmost House at the place called "The World's End"; thence along the Coast to the Point at which the same is met by the first Bank which runs up the Hill to the East of and beyond the Village of Scilly; thence along the said Bank to the Point at which the same meets the Road from Scilly to Charles Fort; thence in a straight Line to a Point on the Harbour Hill Road which is distant One hundred and eighty Yards (measured along the Harbour Hill Road) to the East of the Barrack Wall; thence in a straight Line to the Point first described.

A Topographical Directory of Ireland, published in 1837, describes the parliamentary history of the borough:

It is not known exactly at what time the borough first exercised the elective franchise, but it returned two members to parliament long prior to 1652, and continued to do so without interruption till the Union, since which time it has returned only one to the Imperial parliament. The right of election, previously vested in the corporation, was, by the act of the 2nd of Wm. IV., cap. 88, extended to the £10 householders and limited to the resident freemen; the total number of registered electors up to 1 June 1837, was 224, of whom 192 were £10 householders, and 32 freemen; the sovereign is the returning officer. The borough and liberties comprise an area of 11,000 acres, within the jurisdiction of the borough magistrates; a new electoral boundary has been drawn close round the town, including the village of Scilly, and comprising an area of 273 acres.

== Members of Parliament ==
Election	Member	Party	Note
1801, 1 January	William Rowley		1801: Co-opted
1802, 13 July	Samuel Campbell Rowley		Resigned
1806, 29 April	Henry Martin	Whig	
1818, 27 June	George Coussmaker		Died
1821, 12 July	Sir Josias Rowley, Bt	Tory	
1826, 15 June	John Russell	Whig	
1832, 18 December	Sampson Stawell	Whig	
1835, 15 January	Henry Thomas	Conservative	
1837, 7 August	Pierce Mahony	Whig	Unseated on petition
1838, 1 April	Henry Thomas	Conservative	Declared duly elected
1841, 9 July	William Henry Watson	Whig	
1847, 6 August	Richard Samuel Guinness	Conservative	Unseated on petition and new writ issued
1848, 11 March	Benjamin Hawes	Whig	Resigned
1852, 12 February	John Isaac Heard	Whig	
1859, 7 May	Sir John Arnott	Liberal	Resigned
1863, 8 June	Sir George Colthurst, Bt	Liberal-Conservative	
1874, 3 February	Eugene Collins	Home Rule League	Last MP from the constituency
1885	Constituency abolished		

== Elections ==
=== Elections in the 1830s ===
General election 1830: Kinsale
Party	Candidate	Votes	%
Whig	John Russell (MP)	Unopposed	
Whig hold			

General election 1831: Kinsale
Party	Candidate	Votes	%
Whig	John Russell (MP)	Unopposed	
Registered electors		64	
Whig hold			

General election 1832: Kinsale
Party	Candidate	Votes	%
Whig	Sampson Stawell	96	51.6
Tory	John Cuthbert	90	48.4
Majority		6	3.2
Turnout		186	90.3
Registered electors		206	
Whig hold			

General election 1835: Kinsale
Party	Candidate	Votes	%	±%
Conservative	Henry Thomas (MP)	78	50.3	+1.9
Whig	Thomas Dickson	77	49.7	−1.9
Majority		1	0.6	N/A
Turnout		155	70.1	−20.2
Registered electors		221		
Conservative gain from Whig		Swing	+1.9	

General election 1837: Kinsale
Party	Candidate	Votes	%	±%
Whig	Pierce Mahony	103	51.2	+1.5
Conservative	Henry Thomas (MP)	98	48.8	−1.5
Majority		5	2.4	N/A
Turnout		201	69.1	−1.0
Registered electors		291		
Whig gain from Conservative		Swing	+1.5	

- On petition, Mahony was unseated in favour of Thomas

=== Elections in the 1840s ===
General election 1841: Kinsale
Party	Candidate	Votes	%	±%
Whig	William Henry Watson	98	55.1	+3.9
Conservative	Matthias Wolverley Attwood	80	44.9	−3.9
Majority		18	10.2	+7.8
Turnout		178	59.3	−9.8
Registered electors		300		
Whig hold		Swing	+3.9	

General election 1847: Kinsale
Party	Candidate	Votes	%	±%
Conservative	Richard Samuel Guinness	103	54.5	+9.6
Whig	William Henry Watson	86	45.5	−9.6
Majority		17	9.0	N/A
Turnout		189	55.1	−4.2
Registered electors		343		
Conservative gain from Whig		Swing	+9.6	

On petition, Guinness was unseated and a new writ was issued, causing a by-election.

By-election, 11 March 1848: Kinsale
Party	Candidate	Votes	%	±%
Whig	Benjamin Hawes	97	50.8	+5.3
Conservative	Robert Pelham-Clinton	94	49.2	−5.3
Majority		3	1.6	N/A
Turnout		191	55.7	+0.6
Registered electors		343		
Whig gain from Conservative		Swing	+5.3	

=== Elections in the 1850s ===
Hawes resigned by accepting the office of Steward of the Chiltern Hundreds, causing a by-election.

By-election, 12 February 1852: Kinsale
Party	Candidate	Votes	%	±%
Whig	John Isaac Heard	Unopposed		
Whig gain from Conservative				

General election 1852: Kinsale
Party	Candidate	Votes	%	±%
Whig	John Isaac Heard	Unopposed		
Registered electors		139		
Whig gain from Conservative				

General election 1857: Kinsale
Party	Candidate	Votes	%	±%
Whig	John Isaac Heard	Unopposed		
Registered electors		149		
Whig hold				

General election 1859: Kinsale
Party	Candidate	Votes	%	±%
Liberal	John Arnott	79	67.5	N/A
Conservative	Frederick Brine	38	32.5	New
Majority		41	35.0	N/A
Turnout		117	81.3	N/A
Registered electors		144		
Liberal hold		Swing	N/A	

=== Elections in the 1860s ===
Arnott resigned, causing a by-election.

By-election, 8 June 1863: Kinsale
Party	Candidate	Votes	%	±%
Liberal-Conservative	George Colthurst	63	55.3	New
Conservative	Victor Beare Fitzgibbon	51	44.7	+12.2
Majority		12	10.6	N/A
Turnout		114	78.6	−2.7
Registered electors		145		
Liberal-Conservative gain from Liberal				

General election 1865: Kinsale
Party	Candidate	Votes	%	±%
Liberal-Conservative	George Colthurst	62	52.5	N/A
Liberal	Eugene Collins	56	47.5	−20.0
Majority		6	5.0	N/A
Turnout		118	81.4	+0.1
Registered electors		145		
Liberal-Conservative gain from Liberal				

General election 1868: Kinsale
Party	Candidate	Votes	%	±%
Liberal-Conservative	George Colthurst	Unopposed		
Registered electors		172		
Liberal-Conservative hold				

=== Elections in the 1870s ===
General election 1874: Kinsale
Party	Candidate	Votes	%	±%
Home Rule	Eugene Collins	107	69.5	New
Conservative	Charles Andrews	47	30.5	New
Majority		60	39.0	N/A
Turnout		154	83.7	N/A
Registered electors		184		
Home Rule gain from Liberal-Conservative		Swing	N/A	

=== Elections in the 1880s ===
General election 1880: Kinsale
Party	Candidate	Votes	%	±%
Home Rule	Eugene Collins	112	72.7	+3.2
Conservative	John Carmichael	42	27.3	−3.2
Majority		70	45.4	+6.4
Turnout		154	79.4	−4.3
Registered electors		194		
Home Rule hold		Swing	+3.2	
