= List of United Kingdom Parliament constituencies (1801–1832) =

1801 to 1832
1832 to 1868
1868 to 1885
1885 to 1918
1918 to 1950
1950 to 1974
1974 to 1983
1983 to 1997
1997 to 2024
2024 to present

== South West England (148) ==
=== Cornwall (42) ===
Independent Whigs Tories

Constituency	Members	Type	1801	1802	03	04	05	1806	1807	08	09	10	11	1812	13	14	15	16	17	1818	19	1820	21	22	23	24	25	1826	27	28	29	1830	1831
Bodmin	2	Borough	John Morshead	Josias Porcher				William Wingfield	William Oglander					Charles Bathurst						Thomas Bradyll		John Wilson Croker						Horace Seymour					
Bodmin	2	Borough	John Nesbitt	Charles Shaw-Lefevre	John Sargent			Davies Giddy																									
Bossiney	2	Borough	John Lubbock	John Hiley Addington	George Peter Holford			Henry Baring	Peter Thellusson	John Cuffe									William Yates Peel	Compton Domvile								Edward Rose Tunno					
Bossiney	2	Borough	James Stuart-Wortley																		John Ward				John Stuart-Wortley							Charles James Stuart-Wortley	John Stuart-Wortley
Callington	2	Borough	John Inglett-Fortescue		Ambrose St John			William Wickham	Lord Binning					Sir John Rogers	Charles Trefusis					Edward Pyndar Lygon		Matthias Attwood										Bingham Baring	Henry Bingham Baring
Callington	2	Borough	Paul Orchard					William Garrow	Thomas Carter			William Stephen Poyntz								Christopher Robinson		William Thompson						Alexander Baring					Edward Charles Hugh Herbert
Camelford	2	Borough	William Joseph Denison	Robert Adair										William Leader						Mark Milbank	John Stewart	Mark Milbank											
Camelford	2	Borough	John Angerstein	John Anthony Fonblanque				James Maitland	Henry Lansdowne			Henry Peter Brougham		Samuel Scott						John Bushby Maitland	Lewis Allsopp	Lord Yarmouth		Sheldon Cradock									
Cornwall	2	County	Francis Gregor					John Hearle Tremayne																				Edward William Wynne Pendarves					
Cornwall	2	County	William Lemon																								Richard Rawlinson Vyvyan						Charles Lemon
East Looe	2	Borough	Sir John Mitford	Sir Edward Buller																		George Watson-Taylor						William Lascelles				Thomas Arthur Kemmis	
East Looe	2	Borough	Frederick William Buller	John Buller					David Vanderheyden									Thomas Potter Macqueen										James Drummond Buller-Elphinstone			Henry Thomas Hope		
Fowey	2	Borough	Philip Rashleigh	Reginald Pole Carew										William Rashleigh						George Lucy	Viscount Valletort							Lord Brudenell					
Fowey	2	Borough	Edward Golding	Robert Wigram (senior)																													
Helston	2	Borough																															
Launceston	2	Borough																															
Liskeard	2	Borough																															
Lostwithiel	2	Borough																															
Mitchell, or St Michael's	2	Borough																															
Newport	2	Borough																															
Penryn and Falmouth	2	Borough																															
Saltash	2	Borough																															
St Germans	2	Borough																															
St Ives	2	Borough																															
St Mawes	2	Borough																															
Tregony	2	Borough																															
Truro	2	Borough																															
West Looe	2	Borough																															

=== Devon (26) ===
Constituency	Members	Type
Ashburton	2	Borough
Barnstaple	2	Borough
Beeralston	2	Borough
Dartmouth	2	Borough
Devon	2	County
Exeter	2	Borough
Honiton	2	Borough
Okehampton	2	Borough
Plymouth	2	Borough
Plympton Erle	2	Borough
Tavistock	2	Borough
Tiverton	2	Borough
Totnes	2	Borough

=== Somerset (16) ===
Constituency	Members	Type
Bath	2	Borough
Bridgwater	2	Borough
Ilchester	2	Borough
Milborne Port	2	Borough
Minehead	2	Borough
Somerset	2	County
Taunton	2	Borough
Wells	2	Borough

=== Dorset (20) ===
Constituency	Members	Type
Bridport	2	Borough
Corfe Castle	2	Borough
Dorchester	2	Borough
Dorset	2	County
Lyme Regis	2	Borough
Poole	2	Borough
Shaftesbury	2	Borough
Wareham	2	Borough
Weymouth and Melcombe Regis	4	Borough

=== Gloucestershire (10) ===
Constituency	Members	Type	
Bristol	2	Borough	Partly in Somerset
Cirencester	2	Borough	
Gloucester	2	Borough	
Gloucestershire	2	County	
Tewkesbury	2	Borough	

=== Wiltshire (34) ===
Constituency	Members	Type
Calne	2	Borough
Chippenham	2	Borough
Cricklade	2	Borough
Devizes	2	Borough
Downton	2	Borough
Great Bedwyn	2	Borough
Heytesbury	2	Borough
Hindon	2	Borough
Ludgershall	2	Borough
Malmesbury	2	Borough
Marlborough	2	Borough
Old Sarum	2	Borough
Salisbury	2	Borough
Westbury	2	Borough
Wilton	2	Borough
Wiltshire	2	County
Wootton Bassett	2	Borough

== South East England (126) ==
=== Buckinghamshire (14) ===
Constituency	Members	Type
Amersham	2	Borough
Aylesbury	2	Borough
Buckingham	2	Borough
Buckinghamshire	2	County
Great Marlow	2	Borough
Wendover	2	Borough
Wycombe	2	Borough

=== Oxfordshire (9) ===
Constituency	Members	Type
Banbury	1	Borough
Oxford	2	Borough
Oxfordshire	2	County
Oxford University	2	University
Woodstock	2	Borough

=== Berkshire (9) ===
Constituency	Members	Type
Abingdon	1	Borough
Berkshire	2	County
Reading	2	Borough
Wallingford	2	Borough
Windsor	2	Borough

=== Hampshire (26) ===
Constituency	Members	Type
Andover	2	Borough
Christchurch	2	Borough
Hampshire	2	County
Lymington	2	Borough
Newtown	2	Borough
Petersfield	2	Borough
Portsmouth	2	Borough
Newport	2	Borough
Southampton	2	Borough
Stockbridge	2	Borough
Whitchurch	2	Borough
Winchester	2	Borough
Yarmouth	2	Borough

=== Surrey (14) ===
Constituency	Members	Type
Bletchingley	2	Borough
Gatton	2	Borough
Guildford	2	Borough
Haslemere	2	Borough
Reigate	2	Borough
Southwark	2	Borough
Surrey	2	County

=== Sussex (28) ===
Constituency	Members	Type
Arundel	2	Borough
Bramber	2	Borough
Chichester	2	Borough
East Grinstead	2	Borough
Hastings	2	Borough
Horsham	2	Borough
Lewes	2	Borough
Midhurst	2	Borough
New Shoreham	2	Borough
Rye	2	Borough
Seaford	2	Borough
Steyning	2	Borough
Sussex	2	County
Winchelsea	2	Borough

=== Kent (18) ===
Canterbury	2	Borough
Dover	2	Borough
Hythe	2	Borough
Kent	2	County
Maidstone	2	Borough
New Romney	2	Borough
Queenborough	2	Borough
Rochester	2	Borough
Sandwich	2	Borough

=== Middlesex (8) ===
Constituency	Members	Type
The City of London	4	Borough
Middlesex	2	County
Westminster	2	Borough

== East Anglia (56) ==
=== Bedfordshire (4) ===
Bedford	2	Borough
Bedfordshire	2	County

=== Hertfordshire (6) ===
Hertford	2	Borough
Hertfordshire	2	County
St Albans	2	Borough

=== Huntingdonshire (4) ===
Huntingdon	2	Borough
Huntingdonshire	2	County

=== Cambridgeshire (6) ===
Constituency	Members	Type
Cambridge	2	Borough
Cambridge University	2	University
Cambridgeshire	2	County

=== Norfolk (12) ===
Castle Rising	2	Borough
Great Yarmouth	2	Borough
King's Lynn	2	Borough
Norfolk	2	County
Norwich	2	Borough
Thetford	2	Borough

=== Suffolk (16) ===
Aldeburgh	2	Borough
Bury St Edmunds	2	Borough
Dunwich	2	Borough
Eye	2	Borough
Ipswich	2	Borough
Orford	2	Borough
Sudbury	2	Borough
Suffolk	2	County

=== Essex (8) ===
Colchester	2	Borough
Essex	2	County
Harwich	2	Borough
Maldon	2	Borough

== West Midlands (45) ==
=== Herefordshire (8) ===
Hereford	2	Borough
Herefordshire	2	County
Leominster	2	Borough
Weobley	2	Borough

=== Worcestershire (9) ===
Constituency	Members	Type
Bewdley	1	Borough
Droitwich	2	Borough
Evesham	2	Borough
Worcester	2	Borough
Worcestershire	2	County

=== Warwickshire (6) ===
Constituency	Members	Type
Coventry	2	Borough
Warwick	2	Borough
Warwickshire	2	County

=== Shropshire (12) ===
Bishop's Castle	2	Borough
Bridgnorth	2	Borough
Ludlow	2	Borough
Shrewsbury	2	Borough
Shropshire	2	County
Wenlock	2	Borough

=== Staffordshire (10) ===
Lichfield	2	Borough	
Newcastle-under-Lyme	2	Borough	
Stafford	2	Borough	
Staffordshire	2	County	
Tamworth	2	Borough	Also in Warwickshire

== East Midlands (39) ==
=== Derbyshire (4) ===
Constituency	Members	Type
Derby	2	Borough
Derbyshire	2	County

=== Nottinghamshire (8) ===
East Retford	2	Borough
Newark-on-Trent	2	Borough
Nottingham	2	Borough
Nottinghamshire	2	County

=== Lincolnshire (12) ===
Constituency	Members	Type
Boston	2	Borough
Grantham	2	Borough
Great Grimsby	2	Borough
Lincoln	2	Borough
Lincolnshire	2	County
Stamford	2	Borough

=== Leicestershire (4) ===
Constituency	Members	Type
Leicester	2	Borough
Leicestershire	2	County

=== Rutland (2) ===
Rutland	2	County

=== Northamptonshire (9) ===
Brackley	2	Borough
Higham Ferrers	1	Borough
Northampton	2	Borough
Northamptonshire	2	County
Peterborough	2	Borough

== North West England (28) ==
=== Cheshire (4) ===
Constituency	Members	Type
Cheshire	2	County
Chester	2	Borough

=== Lancashire (14) ===
Constituency	Members	Type
Clitheroe	2	Borough
Lancashire	2	County
Lancaster	2	Borough
Liverpool	2	Borough
Newton	2	Borough
Preston	2	Borough
Wigan	2	Borough

=== Cumberland (6) ===
Constituency	Members	Type
Carlisle	2	Borough
Cockermouth	2	Borough
Cumberland	2	County

=== Westmorland (4) ===
Appleby	2	Borough
Westmorland	2	County

== Yorkshire and the North East (42) ==
=== Yorkshire (30) ===
Aldborough	2	Borough
Beverley	2	Borough
Boroughbridge	2	Borough
Hedon	2	Borough
Kingston upon Hull	2	Borough
Knaresborough	2	Borough
Malton	2	Borough
Northallerton	2	Borough
Pontefract	2	Borough
Richmond	2	Borough
Ripon	2	Borough
Scarborough	2	Borough
Thirsk	2	Borough
York	2	Borough
Yorkshire	2	County

=== Northumberland (8) ===
Constituency	Members	Type
Berwick-upon-Tweed	2	Borough
Morpeth	2	Borough
Newcastle-upon-Tyne	2	Borough
Northumberland	2	County

=== Durham (4) ===
Constituency	Members	Type
Durham City	2	Borough
Durham County	2	County

== Wales (27) ==
=== Anglesey (2) ===
Constituency	Members	Type
Anglesey	1	County
Beaumaris Boroughs	1	District

=== Caernarvonshire (2) ===
Constituency	Members	Type
Caernarvon Boroughs	1	District
Caernarvonshire	1	County

=== Denbighshire (2) ===
Constituency	Members	Type
Denbigh Boroughs	1	District
Denbighshire	1	County

=== Flintshire (2) ===
Constituency	Members	Type
Flint Boroughs	1	District
Flintshire	1	County

=== Merionethshire (1) ===
Constituency	Members	Type
Merionethshire	1	County

=== Montgomeryshire (2) ===
Constituency	Members	Type
Montgomery Boroughs	1	District
Montgomeryshire	1	County

=== Cardiganshire (2) ===
Constituency	Members	Type
Cardigan District	1	District
Cardiganshire	1	County

=== Pembrokeshire (3) ===
Haverfordwest Boroughs	1	District
Pembroke Boroughs	1	District
Pembrokeshire	1	County

=== Carmarthenshire (2) ===
Constituency	Members	Type
Carmarthen	1	District
Carmarthenshire	1	County

=== Radnorshire (2) ===
Constituency	Members	Type
Radnor Boroughs	1	District
Radnorshire	1	County

=== Breconshire (2) ===
Constituency	Members	Type
Brecon	1	Borough
Breconshire	1	County

=== Glamorganshire (2) ===
Cardiff District	1	District
Glamorganshire	1	County

=== Monmouthshire (3) ===
Monmouth Boroughs	1	District
Monmouthshire	2	County

== Scotland (53) ==
=== Orkney and Shetland (1) ===
Orkney and Shetland	1	County

=== Caithness (2) ===
Constituency	Members	Type
Caithness	1	County
Wick Burghs	1	District

=== Sutherland (1) ===
Sutherland	1	County

=== Ross and Cromarty (1) ===
Ross and Cromarty	1	County

=== Invernessshire (2) ===
Inverness Burghs	1	District
Inverness-shire	1	County

=== Banffshire (1) ===
Constituency	Members	Type
Banffshire	1	County

=== Elginshire and Nairnshire (2) ===
Elgin	1	District
Elginshire and Nairnshire	1	County

=== Aberdeenshire (2) ===
Constituency	Members	Type
Aberdeen	1	Borough
Aberdeenshire	1	County

=== Kincardineshire (1) ===
Kincardineshire	1	County

=== Forfarshire (3) ===
Dundee	1	Borough
Forfarshire	1	County
Montrose Burghs	1	District

=== Perthshire (2) ===
Perth	1	Borough
Perthshire	1	County

=== Clackmannanshire and Kinrossshire (1) ===
Clackmannanshire and Kinross-shire	1	County

=== Fife (3) ===
Fife	1	County
Kirkcaldy District of Burghs	1	Burghs
St Andrews Burghs	1	District

=== Argyllshire (1) ===
Constituency	Members	Type
Argyllshire	1	County

=== Dunbartonshire (1) ===
Dunbartonshire	1	County

=== Renfrewshire (3) ===
Greenock	1	Borough
Paisley	1	Borough
Renfrewshire	1	County

=== Stirlingshire (3) ===
Falkirk Burghs	1	District
Stirling Burghs	1	District
Stirlingshire	1	County

=== Ayrshire (3) ===
Constituency	Members	Type
Ayr Burghs	1	District
Ayrshire	1	County
Kilmarnock Burghs	1	District

=== Buteshire (1) ===
Constituency	Members	Type
Buteshire	1	County

=== Lanarkshire (3) ===
Glasgow	2	Borough
Lanarkshire	1	County

=== Linlithgowshire (1) ===
Linlithgowshire	1	County

=== Midlothian (4) ===
Edinburgh	2	Borough
Leith Burghs	1	District
Midlothian	1	County

=== Haddingtonshire (2) ===
Haddington Burghs	1	District
Haddingtonshire	1	County

=== Dumfriesshire (2) ===
Constituency	Members	Type
Dumfries Burghs	1	District
Dumfriesshire	1	County

=== Wigtownshire (2) ===
Wigtown Burghs	1	District
Wigtownshire	1	County

=== Kirkcudbright Stewartry (1) ===
Kirkcudbright Stewartry	1	County

=== Selkirkshire (1) ===
Selkirkshire	1	County

=== Peeblesshire (1) ===
Peeblesshire	1	County

=== Roxburghshire (1) ===
Roxburghshire	1	County

=== Berwickshire (1) ===
Constituency	Members	Type
Berwickshire	1	County

== Ulster (29) ==
=== Antrim (6) ===
Constituency	Members	Type
Antrim	2	County
Belfast	2	Borough
Carrickfergus	1	Borough
Lisburn	1	Borough

=== Londonderry (4) ===
Coleraine	1	Borough
Londonderry	1	Borough
County Londonderry	2	County

=== Tyrone (3) ===
Dungannon	1	Borough
Tyrone	2	County

=== Armagh (4) ===
Constituency	Members	Type	
Armagh	1	Borough	
County Armagh	2	County	
Newry	1	Borough	Also in Down

=== Down (3) ===
Constituency	Members	Type
Down	2	County
Downpatrick	1	Borough

=== Fermanagh (3) ===
Enniskillen	1	Borough
Fermanagh	2	County

=== Donegal (2) ===
Donegal	2	County

=== Monaghan (2) ===
Monaghan	2	County

=== Cavan (2) ===
Cavan	2	County

== Connacht (14) ==
=== Galway (4) ===
Galway Borough	2	Borough
County Galway	2	County

=== Leitrim (2) ===
Leitrim	2	County

=== Roscommon (3) ===
Constituency	Members	Type	
Athlone	1	Borough	Also in Westmeath
Roscommon	2	County	

=== Sligo (3) ===
Sligo	1	Borough
County Sligo	2	County

=== Mayo (2) ===
Mayo	2	County

== Leinster (35) ==
=== Longford (2) ===
County Longford	2	County

=== Louth (4) ===
Drogheda	1	Borough
Dundalk	1	Borough
County Louth	2	County

=== King's County (2) ===
King's County	2	County

=== Queen's County (3) ===
Portarlington	1	Borough	Also in King's County
Queen's County	2	County	

=== Meath (2) ===
Meath	2	County

=== Westmeath (2) ===
Westmeath	2	County

=== Carlow (3) ===
Constituency	Members	Type
Carlow	1	Borough
County Carlow	2	County

=== Dublin (6) ===
Constituency	Members	Type
Dublin	2	Borough
County Dublin	2	County
Dublin University	2	University

=== Wicklow (2) ===
Wicklow	2	County

=== Kildare (2) ===
Kildare	2	County

=== Kilkenny (3) ===
Constituency	Members	Type
Kilkenny City	1	Borough
County Kilkenny	2	County

=== Wexford (4) ===
New Ross	1	Borough
Wexford	1	Borough
County Wexford	2	County

== Munster (29) ==
=== Clare (3) ===
Clare	2	County
Ennis	1	Borough

=== Tipperary (4) ===
Cashel	1	Borough
Clonmel	1	Borough
Tipperary	2	County

=== Limerick (4) ===
Limerick City	2	Borough
County Limerick	2	County

=== Kerry (3) ===
Kerry	2	County
Tralee	1	Borough

=== Cork (8) ===
Constituency	Members	Type
Bandon	1	Borough
Cork City	2	Borough
County Cork	2	County
Kinsale	1	Borough
Mallow	1	Borough
Youghal	1	Borough

=== Waterford (5) ===
Dungarvan	1	Borough
Waterford City	2	Borough
County Waterford	2	County
