= List of United Kingdom Parliament constituencies (2024–present) by region =

1801 to 1832
1832 to 1868
1868 to 1885
1885 to 1918
1918 to 1950
1950 to 1974
1974 to 1983
1983 to 1997
1997 to 2024
2024 to present

UK House of Commons constituencies in 2024

The following 650 seats were contested at the 2024 United Kingdom general election following the 2023 review of Westminster constituencies.

== England ==
=== East Midlands ===
Constituency	Electorate	Ceremonial County	Local authority
Amber Valley CC	70,625	Derbyshire	Amber Valley
Ashfield CC	69,819	Nottinghamshire	Ashfield / Mansfield
Bassetlaw CC	75,773	Nottinghamshire	Bassetlaw
Bolsover CC	74,680	Derbyshire	Bolsover / North East Derbyshire
Boston and Skegness CC	75,806	Lincolnshire	Boston / East Lindsey
Broxtowe CC	72,461	Nottinghamshire	Broxtowe
Chesterfield BC	70,722	Derbyshire	Chesterfield
Corby and East Northamptonshire CC	76,748	Northamptonshire	North Northamptonshire
Daventry CC	76,539	Northamptonshire	North Northamptonshire / West Northamptonshire
Derby North BC	71,876	Derbyshire	Derby
Derby South BC	72,067	Derbyshire	Derby
Derbyshire Dales CC	71,435	Derbyshire	Amber Valley / Derbyshire Dales / South Derbyshire
Erewash CC	71,986	Derbyshire	Erewash
Gainsborough CC	74,750	Lincolnshire	West Lindsey
Gedling CC	75,795	Nottinghamshire	Gedling
Grantham and Bourne CC	72,071	Lincolnshire	North Kesteven / South Kesteven
Harborough, Oadby and Wigston CC	74,810	Leicestershire	Harborough / Oadby and Wigston
High Peak CC	73,960	Derbyshire	High Peak
Hinckley and Bosworth CC	75,683	Leicestershire	Hinckley and Bosworth / North West Leicestershire
Kettering CC	76,163	Northamptonshire	North Northamptonshire
Leicester East BC	76,465	Leicestershire	Leicester
Leicester South BC	71,007	Leicestershire	Leicester
Leicester West BC	76,992	Leicestershire	Leicester
Lincoln BC	74,128	Lincolnshire	Lincoln / North Kesteven
Loughborough CC	73,902	Leicestershire	Charnwood
Louth and Horncastle CC	75,959	Lincolnshire	East Lindsey
Mansfield CC	74,680	Nottinghamshire	Mansfield
Melton and Syston CC	71,615	Leicestershire	Charnwood / Melton
Mid Derbyshire CC	70,085	Derbyshire	Amber Valley / Derby / Erewash
Mid Leicestershire CC	76,173	Leicestershire	Blaby / Charnwood / Hinckley and Bosworth
Newark CC	76,478	Nottinghamshire	Bassetlaw / Newark and Sherwood / Rushcliffe
North East Derbyshire CC	72,344	Derbyshire	Chesterfield / North East Derbyshire
North West Leicestershire CC	75,373	Leicestershire	North West Leicestershire
Northampton North BC	75,713	Northamptonshire	West Northamptonshire
Northampton South BC	71,512	Northamptonshire	West Northamptonshire
Nottingham East BC	75,327	Nottinghamshire	Nottingham
Nottingham North and Kimberley BC	74,515	Nottinghamshire	Broxtowe / Nottingham
Nottingham South BC	76,076	Nottinghamshire	Nottingham
Rushcliffe CC	76,171	Nottinghamshire	Rushcliffe
Rutland and Stamford CC	70,864	Leicestershire / Lincolnshire / Rutland	Harborough / Rutland / South Kesteven
Sherwood Forest CC	76,543	Nottinghamshire	Ashfield / Gedling / Newark and Sherwood
Sleaford and North Hykeham CC	73,380	Lincolnshire	North Kesteven
South Derbyshire CC	71,202	Derbyshire	South Derbyshire
South Holland and The Deepings CC	76,139	Lincolnshire	Boston / South Holland
South Leicestershire CC	75,634	Leicestershire	Blaby / Harborough
South Northamptonshire CC	76,555	Northamptonshire	North Northamptonshire / West Northamptonshire
Wellingborough and Rushden CC	76,669	Northamptonshire	North Northamptonshire

=== East of England ===
Constituency	Electorate	Ceremonial county	Local authority
Basildon and Billericay BC	76,993	Essex	Basildon
Bedford BC	70,068	Bedfordshire	Bedford
Braintree CC	75,662	Essex	Braintree / Uttlesford
Brentwood and Ongar CC	74,937	Essex	Brentwood / Epping Forest
Broadland and Fakenham CC	72,907	Norfolk	Breckland / Broadland
Broxbourne BC	75,454	Hertfordshire	Broxbourne / East Hertfordshire
Bury St Edmunds and Stowmarket CC	75,655	Suffolk	Mid Suffolk / West Suffolk
Cambridge BC	72,560	Cambridgeshire	Cambridge
Castle Point BC	70,923	Essex	Castle Point / Basildon
Central Suffolk and North Ipswich CC	71,020	Suffolk	East Suffolk / Ipswich / Mid Suffolk
Chelmsford BC	76,454	Essex	Chelmsford
Clacton CC	75,959	Essex	Tendring
Colchester BC	76,843	Essex	Colchester
Dunstable and Leighton Buzzard CC	74,069	Bedfordshire	Central Bedfordshire
Ely and East Cambridgeshire CC	76,279	Cambridgeshire	East Cambridgeshire / South Cambridgeshire
Epping Forest CC	74,553	Essex	Epping Forest
Great Yarmouth CC	70,077	Norfolk	Great Yarmouth
Harlow CC	73,479	Essex	Epping Forest / Harlow / Uttlesford
Harpenden and Berkhamsted CC	71,635	Hertfordshire	Dacorum / St Albans
Harwich and North Essex CC	74,838	Essex	Colchester / Tendring
Hemel Hempstead CC	70,496	Hertfordshire	Dacorum
Hertford and Stortford CC	75,396	Hertfordshire	East Hertfordshire
Hertsmere CC	73,256	Hertfordshire	Hertsmere / Welwyn Hatfield
Hitchin CC	72,112	Bedfordshire / Hertfordshire	Central Bedfordshire / North Hertfordshire
Huntingdon CC	75,590	Cambridgeshire	Huntingdonshire
Ipswich BC	75,117	Suffolk	Ipswich
Lowestoft CC	73,967	Suffolk	East Suffolk
Luton North BC	73,266	Bedfordshire	Luton
Luton South and South Bedfordshire CC	70,197	Bedfordshire	Central Bedfordshire / Luton
Maldon CC	76,794	Essex	Chelmsford / Maldon
Mid Bedfordshire CC	71,748	Bedfordshire	Bedford / Central Bedfordshire
Mid Norfolk CC	71,060	Norfolk	Breckland / South Norfolk
North Bedfordshire CC	76,319	Bedfordshire	Bedford / Central Bedfordshire
North East Cambridgeshire CC	70,806	Cambridgeshire	Fenland
North East Hertfordshire CC	76,849	Hertfordshire	East Hertfordshire / North Hertfordshire
North Norfolk CC	70,719	Norfolk	North Norfolk
North West Cambridgeshire CC	73,556	Cambridgeshire	Huntingdonshire / Peterborough
North West Essex CC	76,280	Essex	Chelmsford / Uttlesford
North West Norfolk CC	75,200	Norfolk	Kings Lynn and West Norfolk
Norwich North BC	71,441	Norfolk	Broadland / Norwich
Norwich South BC	73,201	Norfolk	Norwich / South Norfolk
Peterborough CC	72,273	Cambridgeshire	Peterborough
Rayleigh and Wickford CC	76,422	Essex	Basildon / Rochford
South Basildon and East Thurrock CC	73,322	Essex	Basildon / Thurrock
South Cambridgeshire CC	75,484	Cambridgeshire	Cambridge / South Cambridgeshire
South Norfolk CC	69,837	Norfolk	South Norfolk
South Suffolk CC	71,070	Suffolk	Babergh
South West Hertfordshire CC	71,552	Hertfordshire	Dacorum / Three Rivers
South West Norfolk CC	72,496	Norfolk	Breckland / Kings Lynn and West Norfolk
Southend East and Rochford CC	70,094	Essex	Rochford / Southend-on-Sea
Southend West and Leigh BC	76,824	Essex	Southend-on-Sea
St Albans CC	70,881	Hertfordshire	St Albans
St Neots and Mid Cambridgeshire CC	74,699	Cambridgeshire	Huntingdonshire / South Cambridgeshire
Stevenage CC	70,370	Hertfordshire	East Hertfordshire / North Hertfordshire / Stevenage
Suffolk Coastal CC	72,683	Suffolk	East Suffolk
Thurrock BC	73,347	Essex	Thurrock
Watford BC	70,576	Hertfordshire	Hertsmere / Watford
Waveney Valley CC	70,540	Norfolk / Suffolk	East Suffolk / Mid Suffolk / South Norfolk
Welwyn Hatfield CC	74,535	Hertfordshire	Welwyn Hatfield
West Suffolk CC	76,243	Suffolk	West Suffolk
Witham CC	75,064	Essex	Braintree / Colchester / Maldon

=== Greater London ===
Name	Electorate	Boroughs covered
Barking BC	71,822	Barking and Dagenham
Battersea BC	71,949	Wandsworth
Beckenham and Penge BC	76,625	Bromley
Bermondsey and Old Southwark BC	70,602	Southwark
Bethnal Green and Stepney BC	77,000	Tower Hamlets
Bexleyheath and Crayford BC	69,948	Bexley
Brent East BC	75,880	Brent
Brent West BC	76,443	Brent
Brentford and Isleworth BC	76,354	Hounslow; Richmond upon Thames
Bromley and Biggin Hill BC	71,515	Bromley
Carshalton and Wallington BC	72,755	Sutton
Chelsea and Fulham BC	76,481	Hammersmith and Fulham; Kensington and Chelsea
Chingford and Woodford Green BC	75,677	Redbridge; Waltham Forest
Chipping Barnet BC	76,187	Barnet
Cities of London and Westminster BC	73,140	City of London; Westminster
Clapham and Brixton Hill BC	75,460	Lambeth
Croydon East BC	75,436	Croydon
Croydon South BC	71,541	Croydon
Croydon West BC	70,812	Croydon
Dagenham and Rainham BC	73,627	Barking and Dagenham; Havering
Dulwich and West Norwood BC	74,314	Lambeth; Southwark
Ealing Central and Acton BC	75,399	Ealing; Hammersmith and Fulham
Ealing North BC	72,985	Ealing
Ealing Southall BC	75,085	Ealing
East Ham BC	70,902	Newham
Edmonton and Winchmore Hill BC	75,204	Enfield
Eltham and Chislehurst BC	74,179	Bromley; Greenwich
Enfield North BC	76,824	Enfield
Erith and Thamesmead BC	76,728	Bexley; Greenwich
Feltham and Heston BC	75,226	Hounslow
Finchley and Golders Green BC	75,761	Barnet
Greenwich and Woolwich BC	69,824	Greenwich
Hackney North and Stoke Newington BC	75,401	Hackney
Hackney South and Shoreditch BC	75,197	Hackney
Hammersmith and Chiswick BC	74,746	Hammersmith and Fulham and Hounslow
Hampstead and Highgate BC	74,222	Camden; Haringey
Harrow East BC	76,299	Harrow
Harrow West BC	74,060	Harrow
Hayes and Harlington BC	72,897	Hillingdon
Hendon BC	71,496	Barnet
Holborn and St Pancras BC	75,475	Camden
Hornchurch and Upminster BC	76,938	Havering
Hornsey and Friern Barnet BC	70,565	Barnet; Haringey
Ilford North BC	74,684	Redbridge
Ilford South BC	74,065	Barking and Dagenham; Redbridge
Islington North BC	73,970	Islington
Islington South and Finsbury BC	75,905	Hackney; Islington
Kensington and Bayswater BC	75,980	Kensington and Chelsea; Westminster
Kingston and Surbiton BC	75,410	Kingston upon Thames
Lewisham East BC	71,706	Lewisham
Lewisham North BC	73,504	Lewisham
Lewisham West and East Dulwich BC	69,904	Lewisham; Southwark
Leyton and Wanstead BC	71,330	Redbridge; Waltham Forest
Mitcham and Morden BC	76,877	Merton
Old Bexley and Sidcup BC	74,317	Bexley
Orpington BC	71,571	Bromley
Peckham BC	71,176	Southwark
Poplar and Limehouse BC	75,814	Tower Hamlets
Putney BC	73,041	Wandsworth
Queen's Park and Maida Vale BC	75,256	Brent; Westminster
Richmond Park BC	75,037	Kingston upon Thames; Richmond upon Thames
Romford BC	72,730	Havering
Ruislip, Northwood and Pinner BC	72,168	Harrow; Hillingdon
Southgate and Wood Green BC	76,034	Enfield; Haringey
Stratford and Bow BC	73,849	Newham; Tower Hamlets
Streatham and Croydon North BC	76,050	Croydon; Lambeth
Sutton and Cheam BC	71,284	Sutton
Tooting BC	76,986	Wandsworth
Tottenham BC	75,968	Haringey
Twickenham BC	75,889	Richmond upon Thames
Uxbridge and South Ruislip BC	75,042	Hillingdon
Vauxhall and Camberwell Green BC	69,995	Lambeth; Southwark
Walthamstow BC	70,867	Waltham Forest
West Ham and Beckton BC	70,590	Newham
Wimbledon BC	74,641	Kingston upon Thames; Merton

=== North East England ===
Constituency	Electorate	Ceremonial county	Local authority
Bishop Auckland CC	70,879	Durham	County Durham
Blaydon and Consett CC	70,163	Durham / Tyne and Wear	County Durham / Gateshead
Blyth and Ashington CC	75,452	Northumberland	Northumberland
City of Durham CC	72,878	Durham	County Durham
Cramlington and Killingworth CC	73,295	Northumberland / Tyne and Wear	Newcastle upon Tyne / North Tyneside / Northumberland
Darlington CC	70,446	Durham	Darlington
Easington CC	70,043	Durham	County Durham
Gateshead Central and Whickham BC	70,994	Tyne and Wear	Gateshead
Hartlepool CC	71,228	Durham	Hartlepool
Hexham CC	72,738	Northumberland / Tyne and Wear	Newcastle upon Tyne / Northumberland
Houghton and Sunderland South BC	76,883	Tyne and Wear	Sunderland
Jarrow and Gateshead East BC	71,106	Tyne and Wear	Gateshead / South Tyneside
Middlesbrough and Thornaby East BC	71,742	North Yorkshire	Middlesbrough / Stockton-on-Tees
Middlesbrough South and East Cleveland CC	69,967	North Yorkshire	Middlesbrough / Redcar and Cleveland
Newcastle upon Tyne Central and West BC	76,460	Tyne and Wear	Newcastle upon Tyne
Newcastle upon Tyne East and Wallsend BC	76,875	Tyne and Wear	Newcastle upon Tyne / North Tyneside
Newcastle upon Tyne North BC	76,503	Tyne and Wear	Newcastle upon Tyne / North Tyneside
Newton Aycliffe and Spennymoor CC	71,299	Durham	County Durham
North Durham CC	73,079	Durham	County Durham
North Northumberland CC	72,541	Northumberland	Northumberland
Redcar BC	71,331	North Yorkshire	Redcar and Cleveland
South Shields BC	69,725	Tyne and Wear	South Tyneside
Stockton North CC	69,779	Durham	Stockton-on-Tees
Stockton West CC	70,108	Durham / North Yorkshire	Darlington / Stockton-on-Tees
Sunderland Central BC	72,688	Tyne and Wear	Sunderland
Tynemouth BC	73,022	Tyne and Wear	North Tyneside
Washington and Gateshead South BC	71,775	Tyne and Wear	Gateshead / Sunderland

=== North West England ===
Constituency	Electorate	Ceremonial county	Local authority
Altrincham and Sale West BC	73,934	Greater Manchester	Trafford
Ashton-under-Lyne BC	72,278	Greater Manchester	Tameside
Barrow and Furness CC	76,603	Cumbria	Cumberland / Westmorland and Furness
Birkenhead BC	76,271	Merseyside	Wirral
Blackburn BC	70,586	Lancashire	Blackburn with Darwen
Blackley and Middleton South BC	71,735	Greater Manchester	Manchester / Rochdale
Blackpool North and Fleetwood BC	75,396	Lancashire	Blackpool / Wyre
Blackpool South BC	76,071	Lancashire	Blackpool
Bolton North East BC	77,020	Greater Manchester	Bolton
Bolton South and Walkden BC	75,716	Greater Manchester	Bolton / Salford
Bolton West BC	72,125	Greater Manchester	Bolton
Bootle BC	75,194	Merseyside	Sefton
Burnley CC	75,436	Lancashire	Burnley / Pendle
Bury North BC	77,009	Greater Manchester	Bury
Bury South BC	74,598	Greater Manchester	Bury / Salford
Carlisle CC	75,868	Cumbria	Cumberland
Cheadle BC	73,775	Greater Manchester	Stockport
Chester North and Neston CC	72,327	Cheshire	Cheshire West and Chester
Chester South and Eddisbury CC	71,975	Cheshire	Cheshire East / Cheshire West and Chester
Chorley CC	74,568	Lancashire	Chorley / South Ribble
Congleton CC	69,836	Cheshire	Cheshire East
Crewe and Nantwich CC	76,236	Cheshire	Cheshire East
Ellesmere Port and Bromborough BC	71,027	Cheshire / Merseyside	Cheshire West and Chester / Wirral
Fylde CC	75,114	Lancashire	Fylde / Wyre
Gorton and Denton BC	74,306	Greater Manchester	Manchester / Tameside
Hazel Grove CC	72,941	Greater Manchester	Stockport
Heywood and Middleton North CC	73,306	Greater Manchester	Rochdale
Hyndburn CC	69,971	Lancashire	Hyndburn / Ribble Valley
Knowsley BC	71,228	Merseyside	Knowsley
Lancaster and Wyre CC	74,992	Lancashire	Lancaster / Wyre
Leigh and Atherton BC	76,363	Greater Manchester	Wigan
Liverpool Garston BC	70,372	Merseyside	Liverpool
Liverpool Riverside BC	70,157	Merseyside	Liverpool
Liverpool Walton BC	75,926	Merseyside	Liverpool / Sefton
Liverpool Wavertree BC	71,076	Merseyside	Liverpool
Liverpool West Derby BC	70,730	Merseyside	Knowsley / Liverpool
Macclesfield CC	75,881	Cheshire	Cheshire East
Makerfield BC	76,517	Greater Manchester	Wigan
Manchester Central BC	75,311	Greater Manchester	Manchester / Oldham
Manchester Rusholme BC	70,692	Greater Manchester	Manchester
Manchester Withington BC	71,614	Greater Manchester	Manchester
Mid Cheshire CC	69,775	Cheshire	Cheshire East / Cheshire West and Chester
Morecambe and Lunesdale CC	76,040	Cumbria / Lancashire	Lancaster / Westmorland and Furness
Oldham East and Saddleworth CC	72,997	Greater Manchester	Oldham
Oldham West, Chadderton and Royton BC	74,183	Greater Manchester	Oldham
Pendle and Clitheroe CC	76,941	Lancashire	Pendle / Ribble Valley
Penrith and Solway CC	76,720	Cumbria	Cumberland / Westmorland and Furness
Preston BC	72,946	Lancashire	Preston
Ribble Valley CC	75,993	Lancashire	Preston / Ribble Valley / South Ribble
Rochdale CC	71,697	Greater Manchester	Rochdale
Rossendale and Darwen BC	74,593	Lancashire	Blackburn with Darwen / Rossendale
Runcorn and Helsby CC	70,950	Cheshire	Cheshire West and Chester / Halton
Salford BC	72,169	Greater Manchester	Salford
Sefton Central CC	74,746	Merseyside	Sefton
South Ribble CC	72,029	Lancashire	South Ribble
Southport CC	74,168	Lancashire / Merseyside	Sefton / West Lancashire
St Helens North CC	76,082	Merseyside	St Helens
St Helens South and Whiston BC	70,302	Merseyside	Knowsley / St Helens
Stalybridge and Hyde BC	73,028	Greater Manchester	Tameside
Stockport BC	74,769	Greater Manchester	Stockport
Stretford and Urmston BC	73,212	Greater Manchester	Trafford
Tatton CC	75,538	Cheshire	Cheshire East / Cheshire West and Chester / Warrington
Wallasey BC	73,054	Merseyside	Wirral
Warrington North CC	72,350	Cheshire	Warrington
Warrington South BC	76,639	Cheshire	Warrington
West Lancashire CC	73,652	Lancashire	West Lancashire
Westmorland and Lonsdale CC	72,322	Cumbria	Westmorland and Furness
Whitehaven and Workington CC	73,385	Cumbria	Cumberland
Widnes and Halewood CC	70,865	Cheshire / Merseyside	Halton / Knowsley
Wigan CC	75,607	Greater Manchester	Wigan
Wirral West CC	72,126	Merseyside	Wirral
Worsley and Eccles CC	76,915	Greater Manchester	Salford / Wigan
Wythenshawe and Sale East BC	76,971	Greater Manchester	Manchester / Trafford

=== South East England ===
South East England
Constituency	Electorate	Ceremonial county	Local authority
Aldershot BC	76,765	Hampshire	Hart / Rushmoor
Arundel and South Downs CC	76,974	West Sussex	Arun / Chichester / Horsham
Ashford CC	73,546	Kent	Ashford / Folkestone and Hythe
Aylesbury CC	75,636	Buckinghamshire	Buckinghamshire
Banbury CC	69,943	Oxfordshire	Cherwell / West Oxfordshire
Basingstoke BC	77,050	Hampshire	Basingstoke and Deane
Beaconsfield CC	72,315	Buckinghamshire	Buckinghamshire
Bexhill and Battle CC	70,869	East Sussex	Rother / Wealden
Bicester and Woodstock CC	70,389	Oxfordshire	Cherwell / West Oxfordshire
Bognor Regis and Littlehampton CC	76,985	West Sussex	Arun
Bracknell BC	70,247	Berkshire	Bracknell Forest
Brighton Kemptown and Peacehaven BC	69,865	East Sussex	Brighton and Hove / Lewes
Brighton Pavilion BC	75,722	East Sussex	Brighton and Hove
Buckingham and Bletchley CC	73,644	Buckinghamshire	Buckinghamshire / Milton Keynes
Canterbury CC	75,499	Kent	Canterbury
Chatham and Aylesford CC	74,840	Kent	Medway / Tonbridge and Malling
Chesham and Amersham CC	74,155	Buckinghamshire	Buckinghamshire
Chichester CC	76,785	West Sussex	Arun / Chichester
Crawley BC	74,446	West Sussex	Crawley
Dartford CC	72,048	Kent	Dartford
Didcot and Wantage CC	74,456	Oxfordshire	South Oxfordshire / Vale of White Horse
Dorking and Horley CC	70,317	Surrey	Mole Valley / Reigate and Banstead
Dover and Deal CC	75,855	Kent	Dover
Earley and Woodley BC	70,083	Berkshire	Reading / Wokingham
East Grinstead and Uckfield CC	72,356	East Sussex / West Sussex	Lewes / Mid Sussex / Wealden
East Hampshire CC	69,959	Hampshire	East Hampshire
East Surrey CC	73,145	Surrey	Reigate and Banstead / Tandridge
East Thanet BC	73,790	Kent	Thanet
East Worthing and Shoreham BC	75,466	West Sussex	Adur / Worthing
Eastbourne BC	73,322	East Sussex	Eastbourne
Eastleigh BC	69,982	Hampshire	Eastleigh / Test Valley
Epsom and Ewell BC	76,844	Surrey	Epsom and Ewell / Mole Valley
Esher and Walton BC	73,280	Surrey	Elmbridge
Fareham and Waterlooville CC	77,036	Hampshire	Fareham / Havant / Winchester
Farnham and Bordon CC	72,938	Hampshire / Surrey	East Hampshire / Waverley
Faversham and Mid Kent CC	71,798	Kent	Maidstone / Swale
Folkestone and Hythe CC	70,023	Kent	Folkestone and Hythe
Gillingham and Rainham BC	73,951	Kent	Medway
Godalming and Ash CC	71,399	Surrey	Guildford / Waverley
Gosport BC	73,763	Hampshire	Fareham / Gosport
Gravesham CC	72,866	Kent	Gravesham
Guildford CC	71,367	Surrey	Guildford
Hamble Valley CC	76,902	Hampshire	Eastleigh / Fareham / Winchester
Hastings and Rye CC	75,581	East Sussex	Hastings / Rother
Havant BC	72,766	Hampshire	Havant
Henley and Thame CC	70,626	Oxfordshire	South Oxfordshire
Herne Bay and Sandwich CC	76,028	Kent	Canterbury / Dover / Thanet
Horsham CC	76,981	West Sussex	Horsham
Hove and Portslade BC	73,726	East Sussex	Brighton and Hove
Isle of Wight East CC	56,805	Isle of Wight	Isle of Wight
Isle of Wight West CC	54,911	Isle of Wight	Isle of Wight
Lewes CC	75,091	East Sussex	Lewes / Wealden
Maidenhead CC	73,463	Berkshire	Bracknell Forest / Windsor and Maidenhead
Maidstone and Malling CC	73,084	Kent	Maidstone / Tonbridge and Malling
Mid Buckinghamshire CC	72,240	Buckinghamshire	Buckinghamshire
Mid Sussex CC	72,255	West Sussex	Mid Sussex
Milton Keynes Central BC	76,708	Buckinghamshire	Milton Keynes
Milton Keynes North CC	70,620	Buckinghamshire	Milton Keynes
New Forest East CC	73,823	Hampshire	New Forest
New Forest West CC	71,009	Hampshire	New Forest
Newbury CC	71,631	Berkshire	West Berkshire
North East Hampshire CC	73,306	Hampshire	Basingstoke and Deane / Hart
North West Hampshire CC	76,004	Hampshire	Basingstoke and Deane / Test Valley
Oxford East BC	72,731	Oxfordshire	Oxford
Oxford West and Abingdon CC	72,004	Oxfordshire	Oxford / Vale of White Horse
Portsmouth North BC	71,844	Hampshire	Portsmouth
Portsmouth South BC	74,253	Hampshire	Portsmouth
Reading Central BC	71,283	Berkshire	Reading
Reading West and Mid Berkshire CC	69,999	Berkshire	Reading / West Berkshire
Reigate CC	76,139	Surrey	Reigate and Banstead
Rochester and Strood CC	72,155	Kent	Medway
Romsey and Southampton North CC	73,831	Hampshire	Southampton / Test Valley
Runnymede and Weybridge CC	73,778	Surrey	Elmbridge / Runnymede
Sevenoaks CC	73,684	Kent	Dartford / Sevenoaks
Sittingbourne and Sheppey CC	76,818	Kent	Swale
Slough BC	75,287	Berkshire	Slough
Southampton Itchen BC	72,150	Hampshire	Southampton
Southampton Test BC	69,960	Hampshire	Southampton
Spelthorne BC	72,897	Surrey	Spelthorne
Surrey Heath CC	70,825	Surrey	Guildford / Surrey Heath
Sussex Weald CC	70,075	East Sussex	Wealden
Tonbridge CC	73,692	Kent	Sevenoaks / Tonbridge and Malling
Tunbridge Wells CC	75,213	Kent	Tunbridge Wells
Weald of Kent CC	70,110	Kent	Ashford / Maidstone / Tunbridge Wells
Winchester CC	76,577	Hampshire	Winchester
Windsor CC	74,338	Berkshire / Surrey	Runnymede / Slough / Windsor and Maidenhead
Witney CC	70,042	Oxfordshire	Vale of White Horse / West Oxfordshire
Woking BC	71,737	Surrey	Woking
Wokingham CC	70,235	Berkshire	Wokingham
Worthing West BC	76,293	West Sussex	Adur / Worthing
Wycombe CC	71,769	Buckinghamshire	Buckinghamshire

=== South West England ===
South West England
Constituency	Electorate	Ceremonial county	Local authority
Bath CC	73,241	Somerset	Bath and North East Somerset
Bournemouth East BC	73,173	Dorset	Bournemouth, Christchurch and Poole
Bournemouth West BC	72,094	Dorset	Bournemouth, Christchurch and Poole
Bridgwater CC	71,418	Somerset	Somerset
Bristol Central BC	70,227	Bristol	Bristol
Bristol East BC	75,936	Bristol	Bristol
Bristol North East BC	69,793	Bristol / Gloucestershire	Bristol / South Gloucestershire
Bristol North West BC	76,783	Bristol	Bristol
Bristol South BC	74,696	Bristol	Bristol
Camborne and Redruth CC	73,568	Cornwall	Cornwall
Central Devon CC	73,491	Devon	Mid Devon / Teignbridge / West Devon
Cheltenham BC	75,292	Gloucestershire	Cheltenham
Chippenham CC	71,648	Wiltshire	Wiltshire
Christchurch CC	71,598	Dorset	Bournemouth, Christchurch and Poole / Dorset
East Wiltshire CC	71,109	Wiltshire	Swindon / Wiltshire
Exeter BC	71,713	Devon	Exeter
Exmouth and Exeter East CC	74,502	Devon	East Devon / Exeter
Filton and Bradley Stoke CC	73,598	Gloucestershire	South Gloucestershire
Forest of Dean CC	71,510	Gloucestershire	Forest of Dean / Tewkesbury
Frome and East Somerset CC	70,177	Somerset	Bath and North East Somerset / Somerset
Glastonbury and Somerton CC	70,015	Somerset	Somerset
Gloucester BC	76,695	Gloucestershire	Gloucester
Honiton and Sidmouth CC	74,365	Devon	East Devon / Mid Devon
Melksham and Devizes CC	71,823	Wiltshire	Wiltshire
Mid Dorset and North Poole CC	74,305	Dorset	Bournemouth, Christchurch and Poole / Dorset
Newton Abbot CC	72,956	Devon	Teignbridge
North Cornwall CC	75,034	Cornwall	Cornwall
North Cotswolds CC	70,915	Gloucestershire	Cotswold / Stroud / Tewkesbury
North Devon CC	76,455	Devon	North Devon
North Dorset CC	72,109	Dorset	Dorset
North East Somerset and Hanham CC	73,113	Gloucestershire / Somerset	Bath and North East Somerset / South Gloucestershire
North Somerset CC	73,963	Somerset	North Somerset
Plymouth Moor View BC	73,378	Devon	Plymouth
Plymouth Sutton and Devonport BC	73,495	Devon	Plymouth
Poole BC	72,162	Dorset	Bournemouth, Christchurch and Poole
Salisbury CC	70,242	Wiltshire	Wiltshire
South Cotswolds CC	72,865	Gloucestershire / Wiltshire	Cotswold / Stroud / Wiltshire
South Devon CC	71,691	Devon	South Hams / Torbay
South Dorset CC	76,640	Dorset	Dorset
South East Cornwall CC	71,734	Cornwall	Cornwall
South West Devon CC	75,371	Devon	Plymouth / South Hams / West Devon
South West Wiltshire CC	71,551	Wiltshire	Wiltshire
St Austell and Newquay CC	74,585	Cornwall	Cornwall
St Ives CC	70,107	Cornwall	Cornwall / Isles of Scilly
Stroud CC	76,249	Gloucestershire	Stroud
Swindon North CC	72,163	Wiltshire	Swindon
Swindon South BC	72,468	Wiltshire	Swindon
Taunton and Wellington CC	76,049	Somerset	Somerset
Tewkesbury CC	72,426	Gloucestershire	Cheltenham / Gloucester / Tewkesbury
Thornbury and Yate CC	74,985	Gloucestershire	South Gloucestershire
Tiverton and Minehead CC	70,829	Devon / Somerset	Mid Devon / Somerset
Torbay BC	75,742	Devon	Torbay
Torridge and Tavistock CC	74,802	Devon	Torridge / West Devon
Truro and Falmouth CC	73,326	Cornwall	Cornwall
Wells and Mendip Hills CC	69,843	Somerset	North Somerset / Somerset
West Dorset CC	75,390	Dorset	Dorset
Weston-super-Mare CC	70,722	Somerset	North Somerset
Yeovil CC	76,056	Somerset	Somerset

=== West Midlands ===
West Midlands
Constituency	Electorate	Ceremonial county	Local authority
Aldridge-Brownhills BC	73,122	West Midlands	Walsall
Birmingham Edgbaston BC	71,354	West Midlands	Birmingham
Birmingham Erdington BC	76,856	West Midlands	Birmingham
Birmingham Hall Green and Moseley BC	75,781	West Midlands	Birmingham
Birmingham Hodge Hill and Solihull North BC	76,922	West Midlands	Birmingham / Solihull
Birmingham Ladywood BC	76,585	West Midlands	Birmingham
Birmingham Northfield BC	73,483	West Midlands	Birmingham
Birmingham Perry Barr BC	74,048	West Midlands	Birmingham
Birmingham Selly Oak BC	76,285	West Midlands	Birmingham
Birmingham Yardley BC	71,912	West Midlands	Birmingham
Bromsgrove CC	75,305	Worcestershire	Bromsgrove
Burton and Uttoxeter CC	75,460	Staffordshire	East Staffordshire
Cannock Chase CC	75,582	Staffordshire	Cannock Chase
Coventry East BC	73,389	West Midlands	Coventry
Coventry North West BC	73,431	West Midlands	Coventry
Coventry South BC	70,998	West Midlands	Coventry
Droitwich and Evesham CC	74,345	Worcestershire	Wychavon
Dudley BC	71,083	West Midlands	Dudley
Halesowen BC	69,907	West Midlands	Dudley / Sandwell
Hereford and South Herefordshire CC	71,125	Herefordshire	Herefordshire
Kenilworth and Southam CC	71,541	Warwickshire	Rugby / Stratford-on-Avon / Warwick
Kingswinford and South Staffordshire CC	71,896	Staffordshire / West Midlands	Dudley / South Staffordshire
Lichfield CC	74,942	Staffordshire	East Staffordshire / Lichfield
Meriden and Solihull East CC	74,211	West Midlands	Solihull
Newcastle-under-Lyme CC	70,025	Staffordshire	Newcastle-under-Lyme
North Herefordshire CC	70,894	Herefordshire	Herefordshire
North Shropshire CC	77,052	Shropshire	Shropshire
North Warwickshire and Bedworth CC	70,245	Warwickshire	North Warwickshire / Nuneaton and Bedworth
Nuneaton CC	70,335	Warwickshire	North Warwickshire / Nuneaton and Bedworth
Redditch CC	69,921	Worcestershire	Redditch / Wychavon
Rugby CC	72,603	Warwickshire	Nuneaton and Bedworth / Rugby
Shrewsbury CC	75,139	Shropshire	Shropshire
Smethwick BC	71,195	West Midlands	Sandwell
Solihull West and Shirley BC	70,537	West Midlands	Solihull
South Shropshire CC	77,034	Shropshire	Shropshire
Stafford CC	70,537	Staffordshire	Newcastle-under-Lyme / Stafford
Staffordshire Moorlands CC	70,113	Staffordshire	Staffordshire Moorlands
Stoke-on-Trent Central BC	70,550	Staffordshire	Stoke-on-Trent
Stoke-on-Trent North BC	69,821	Staffordshire	Newcastle-under-Lyme / Stoke-on-Trent
Stoke-on-Trent South CC	69,831	Staffordshire	Stafford / Staffordshire Moorlands / Stoke-on-Trent
Stone, Great Wyrley and Penkridge CC	70,701	Staffordshire	South Staffordshire / Stafford
Stourbridge BC	69,840	West Midlands	Dudley
Stratford-on-Avon CC	72,388	Warwickshire	Stratford-on-Avon
Sutton Coldfield BC	74,584	West Midlands	Birmingham
Tamworth CC	73,644	Staffordshire	Lichfield / Tamworth
Telford BC	70,768	Shropshire	Telford and Wrekin
The Wrekin CC	76,143	Shropshire	Shropshire / Telford and Wrekin
Tipton and Wednesbury BC	73,820	West Midlands	Dudley / Sandwell
Walsall and Bloxwich BC	74,886	West Midlands	Walsall
Warwick and Leamington BC	75,440	Warwickshire	Warwick
West Bromwich BC	72,208	West Midlands	Sandwell
West Worcestershire CC	76,638	Worcestershire	Malvern Hills / Wychavon
Wolverhampton North East BC	70,449	West Midlands	Walsall / Wolverhampton
Wolverhampton South East BC	75,685	West Midlands	Walsall / Wolverhampton
Wolverhampton West BC	75,592	West Midlands	Wolverhampton
Worcester BC	73,928	Worcestershire	Worcester
Wyre Forest CC	77,015	Worcestershire	Wyre Forest

=== Yorkshire and the Humber ===
Yorkshire and the Humber
Constituency	Electorate	Ceremonial county	Local authority
Barnsley North CC	76,794	South Yorkshire	Barnsley
Barnsley South CC	75,896	South Yorkshire	Barnsley
Beverley and Holderness CC	71,102	East Riding of Yorkshire	East Riding of Yorkshire
Bradford East BC	72,150	West Yorkshire	Bradford
Bradford South BC	70,890	West Yorkshire	Bradford
Bradford West BC	71,258	West Yorkshire	Bradford
Bridlington and The Wolds CC	72,501	East Riding of Yorkshire	East Riding of Yorkshire
Brigg and Immingham CC	71,628	Lincolnshire	North East Lincolnshire / North Lincolnshire
Calder Valley CC	75,987	West Yorkshire	Calderdale
Colne Valley CC	71,518	West Yorkshire	Kirklees
Dewsbury and Batley BC	70,226	West Yorkshire	Kirklees
Doncaster Central CC	75,007	South Yorkshire	Doncaster
Doncaster East and the Isle of Axholme CC	70,113	Lincolnshire / South Yorkshire	Doncaster / North Lincolnshire
Doncaster North CC	71,739	South Yorkshire	Doncaster
Goole and Pocklington CC	76,337	East Riding of Yorkshire	East Riding of Yorkshire
Great Grimsby and Cleethorpes BC	77,050	Lincolnshire	North East Lincolnshire
Halifax CC	74,563	West Yorkshire	Calderdale
Harrogate and Knaresborough BC	75,800	North Yorkshire	North Yorkshire
Huddersfield BC	76,044	West Yorkshire	Kirklees
Keighley and Ilkley CC	72,954	West Yorkshire	Bradford
Kingston upon Hull East BC	72,622	East Riding of Yorkshire	Kingston upon Hull
Kingston upon Hull North and Cottingham BC	76,039	East Riding of Yorkshire	East Riding of Yorkshire / Kingston upon Hull
Kingston upon Hull West and Haltemprice CC	74,321	East Riding of Yorkshire	East Riding of Yorkshire / Kingston upon Hull
Leeds Central and Headingley BC	75,396	West Yorkshire	Leeds
Leeds East CC	75,330	West Yorkshire	Leeds
Leeds North East BC	70,976	West Yorkshire	Leeds
Leeds North West CC	71,607	West Yorkshire	Leeds
Leeds South BC	74,726	West Yorkshire	Leeds
Leeds South West and Morley BC	71,376	West Yorkshire	Leeds
Leeds West and Pudsey BC	70,270	West Yorkshire	Leeds
Normanton and Hemsworth CC	75,388	West Yorkshire	Wakefield
Ossett and Denby Dale CC	71,595	West Yorkshire	Kirklees / Wakefield
Penistone and Stocksbridge CC	71,377	South Yorkshire	Barnsley / Sheffield
Pontefract, Castleford and Knottingley CC	72,751	West Yorkshire	Wakefield
Rawmarsh and Conisbrough CC	70,272	South Yorkshire	Doncaster / Rotherham
Richmond and Northallerton CC	72,744	North Yorkshire	North Yorkshire
Rother Valley CC	70,814	South Yorkshire	Rotherham
Rotherham BC	75,345	South Yorkshire	Rotherham
Scarborough and Whitby CC	73,862	North Yorkshire	North Yorkshire
Scunthorpe CC	74,278	Lincolnshire	North Lincolnshire
Selby CC	74,761	North Yorkshire / West Yorkshire	Leeds / North Yorkshire
Sheffield Brightside and Hillsborough BC	71,154	South Yorkshire	Sheffield
Sheffield Central BC	70,453	South Yorkshire	Sheffield
Sheffield Hallam CC	76,637	South Yorkshire	Sheffield
Sheffield Heeley BC	74,614	South Yorkshire	Sheffield
Sheffield South East BC	76,223	South Yorkshire	Sheffield
Shipley CC	74,095	West Yorkshire	Bradford
Skipton and Ripon CC	76,758	North Yorkshire	North Yorkshire
Spen Valley CC	72,169	West Yorkshire	Kirklees
Thirsk and Malton CC	76,623	North Yorkshire	North Yorkshire
Wakefield and Rothwell BC	73,968	West Yorkshire	Leeds / Wakefield
Wetherby and Easingwold CC	71,455	North Yorkshire / West Yorkshire	North Yorkshire / Leeds
York Central BC	74,854	North Yorkshire	York
York Outer CC	72,720	North Yorkshire	York

== Scotland ==
Scotland
Council areas	Constituencies
Orkney Islands; Shetland Islands	Orkney and Shetland CC (continuing)
Na h-Eileanan an Iar	Na h-Eileanan an Iar CC (continuing)
Aberdeen City; Aberdeenshire; Argyll and Bute; Highland; Moray	Aberdeen North BC (continuing)
Aberdeen City; Aberdeenshire; Argyll and Bute; Highland; Moray	Aberdeen South BC (continuing)
Aberdeen City; Aberdeenshire; Argyll and Bute; Highland; Moray	Aberdeenshire North and Moray East CC
Aberdeen City; Aberdeenshire; Argyll and Bute; Highland; Moray	Argyll, Bute and South Lochaber CC
Aberdeen City; Aberdeenshire; Argyll and Bute; Highland; Moray	Caithness, Sutherland and Easter Ross CC (continuing)
Aberdeen City; Aberdeenshire; Argyll and Bute; Highland; Moray	Gordon and Buchan CC
Aberdeen City; Aberdeenshire; Argyll and Bute; Highland; Moray	Inverness, Skye and West Ross-shire CC
Aberdeen City; Aberdeenshire; Argyll and Bute; Highland; Moray	Moray West, Nairn and Strathspey CC
Aberdeen City; Aberdeenshire; Argyll and Bute; Highland; Moray	West Aberdeenshire and Kincardine CC (continuing)
Angus; Clackmannanshire; Dundee City; Falkirk; Fife; Perth and Kinross; Stirling; West Lothian	Alloa and Grangemouth CC
Angus; Clackmannanshire; Dundee City; Falkirk; Fife; Perth and Kinross; Stirling; West Lothian	Angus and Perthshire Glens CC
Angus; Clackmannanshire; Dundee City; Falkirk; Fife; Perth and Kinross; Stirling; West Lothian	Arbroath and Broughty Ferry CC
Angus; Clackmannanshire; Dundee City; Falkirk; Fife; Perth and Kinross; Stirling; West Lothian	Bathgate and Linlithgow CC
Angus; Clackmannanshire; Dundee City; Falkirk; Fife; Perth and Kinross; Stirling; West Lothian	Cowdenbeath and Kirkcaldy CC
Angus; Clackmannanshire; Dundee City; Falkirk; Fife; Perth and Kinross; Stirling; West Lothian	Dundee Central BC
Angus; Clackmannanshire; Dundee City; Falkirk; Fife; Perth and Kinross; Stirling; West Lothian	Dunfermline and Dollar CC
Angus; Clackmannanshire; Dundee City; Falkirk; Fife; Perth and Kinross; Stirling; West Lothian	Falkirk CC (continuing)
Angus; Clackmannanshire; Dundee City; Falkirk; Fife; Perth and Kinross; Stirling; West Lothian	Glenrothes and Mid Fife CC
Angus; Clackmannanshire; Dundee City; Falkirk; Fife; Perth and Kinross; Stirling; West Lothian	Livingston CC (continuing)
Angus; Clackmannanshire; Dundee City; Falkirk; Fife; Perth and Kinross; Stirling; West Lothian	North East Fife CC (continuing)
Angus; Clackmannanshire; Dundee City; Falkirk; Fife; Perth and Kinross; Stirling; West Lothian	Perth and Kinross-shire CC
Angus; Clackmannanshire; Dundee City; Falkirk; Fife; Perth and Kinross; Stirling; West Lothian	Stirling and Strathallan CC
City of Edinburgh; East Lothian; Midlothian	Edinburgh East and Musselburgh BC (restored; previously existed 1997–2005)
City of Edinburgh; East Lothian; Midlothian	Edinburgh North and Leith BC (continuing)
City of Edinburgh; East Lothian; Midlothian	Edinburgh South BC (continuing)
City of Edinburgh; East Lothian; Midlothian	Edinburgh South West BC (continuing)
City of Edinburgh; East Lothian; Midlothian	Edinburgh West BC (continuing)
City of Edinburgh; East Lothian; Midlothian	Lothian East CC
City of Edinburgh; East Lothian; Midlothian	Midlothian CC (continuing)
Dumfries and Galloway; East Dunbartonshire; North Lanarkshire; Scottish Borders; South Lanarkshire; West Dunbartonshire	Airdrie and Shotts CC (continuing)
Dumfries and Galloway; East Dunbartonshire; North Lanarkshire; Scottish Borders; South Lanarkshire; West Dunbartonshire	Berwickshire, Roxburgh and Selkirk CC (continuing)
Dumfries and Galloway; East Dunbartonshire; North Lanarkshire; Scottish Borders; South Lanarkshire; West Dunbartonshire	Coatbridge and Bellshill BC
Dumfries and Galloway; East Dunbartonshire; North Lanarkshire; Scottish Borders; South Lanarkshire; West Dunbartonshire	Cumbernauld and Kirkintilloch CC
Dumfries and Galloway; East Dunbartonshire; North Lanarkshire; Scottish Borders; South Lanarkshire; West Dunbartonshire	Dumfries and Galloway CC (continuing)
Dumfries and Galloway; East Dunbartonshire; North Lanarkshire; Scottish Borders; South Lanarkshire; West Dunbartonshire	Dumfriesshire, Clydesdale and Tweeddale CC (continuing)
Dumfries and Galloway; East Dunbartonshire; North Lanarkshire; Scottish Borders; South Lanarkshire; West Dunbartonshire	East Kilbride and Strathaven CC
Dumfries and Galloway; East Dunbartonshire; North Lanarkshire; Scottish Borders; South Lanarkshire; West Dunbartonshire	Hamilton and Clyde Valley CC
Dumfries and Galloway; East Dunbartonshire; North Lanarkshire; Scottish Borders; South Lanarkshire; West Dunbartonshire	Mid Dunbartonshire CC
Dumfries and Galloway; East Dunbartonshire; North Lanarkshire; Scottish Borders; South Lanarkshire; West Dunbartonshire	Motherwell, Wishaw and Carluke CC
Dumfries and Galloway; East Dunbartonshire; North Lanarkshire; Scottish Borders; South Lanarkshire; West Dunbartonshire	Rutherglen BC (restored; previously existed 1918–1983; Glasgow Rutherglen 1983–2005)
Dumfries and Galloway; East Dunbartonshire; North Lanarkshire; Scottish Borders; South Lanarkshire; West Dunbartonshire	West Dunbartonshire CC (continuing)
East Ayrshire; North Ayrshire; South Ayrshire	Ayr, Carrick and Cumnock CC (continuing)
East Ayrshire; North Ayrshire; South Ayrshire	Central Ayrshire CC (continuing)
East Ayrshire; North Ayrshire; South Ayrshire	Kilmarnock and Loudoun CC (continuing)
East Ayrshire; North Ayrshire; South Ayrshire	North Ayrshire and Arran CC (continuing)
East Renfrewshire	East Renfrewshire (continuing)
Glasgow City; Inverclyde; Renfrewshire	Glasgow East BC (continuing)
Glasgow City; Inverclyde; Renfrewshire	Glasgow North BC (continuing)
Glasgow City; Inverclyde; Renfrewshire	Glasgow North East BC (continuing)
Glasgow City; Inverclyde; Renfrewshire	Glasgow South BC (continuing)
Glasgow City; Inverclyde; Renfrewshire	Glasgow South West BC (continuing)
Glasgow City; Inverclyde; Renfrewshire	Glasgow West BC
Glasgow City; Inverclyde; Renfrewshire	Inverclyde and Renfrewshire West CC
Glasgow City; Inverclyde; Renfrewshire	Paisley and Renfrewshire North BC (continuing)
Glasgow City; Inverclyde; Renfrewshire	Paisley and Renfrewshire South CC (continuing)

== Wales ==
Map of the 32 constituencies in Wales.

Wales
Constituency	Electorate	Preserved county	Local authority
Aberafan Maesteg CC	69,817	Mid Glamorgan / West Glamorgan	Bridgend / Neath Port Talbot
Alyn and Deeside CC	75,695	Clwyd	Flintshire
Bangor Aberconwy CC	70,468	Clwyd / Gwynedd	Conwy / Denbighshire / Gwynedd
Blaenau Gwent and Rhymney CC	71,079	Gwent	Blaenau Gwent / Caerphilly
Brecon, Radnor and Cwm Tawe CC	72,113	Powys / West Glamorgan	Neath Port Talbot / Powys
Bridgend CC	70,770	Mid Glamorgan	Bridgend
Caerfyrddin CC	72,683	Dyfed	Carmarthenshire
Caerphilly CC	72,458	Gwent	Caerphilly
Cardiff East BC	72,463	South Glamorgan	Cardiff
Cardiff North BC	71,143	Mid Glamorgan / South Glamorgan	Cardiff / Rhondda Cynon Taff
Cardiff South and Penarth BC	72,269	South Glamorgan	Cardiff / Vale of Glamorgan
Cardiff West BC	73,947	Mid Glamorgan / South Glamorgan	Cardiff / Rhondda Cynon Taff
Ceredigion Preseli CC	74,063	Dyfed	Ceredigion / Pembrokeshire
Clwyd East CC	76,395	Clwyd	Denbighshire / Flintshire / Wrexham
Clwyd North CC	76,150	Clwyd	Conwy / Denbighshire
Dwyfor Meirionnydd CC	72,533	Clwyd / Gwynedd	Denbighshire / Gwynedd
Gower CC	76,801	West Glamorgan	Swansea
Llanelli CC	69,895	Dyfed	Carmarthenshire
Merthyr Tydfil and Aberdare CC	74,805	Mid Glamorgan	Merthyr Tydfil / Rhondda Cynon Taff
Mid and South Pembrokeshire CC	76,820	Dyfed	Pembrokeshire
Monmouthshire CC	72,681	Gwent	Monmouthshire
Montgomeryshire and Glyndŵr CC	74,223	Clwyd / Powys	Powys / Wrexham
Neath and Swansea East CC	74,705	West Glamorgan	Neath Port Talbot / Swansea
Newport East BC	76,159	Gwent	Newport
Newport West and Islwyn CC	76,234	Gwent	Caerphilly / Newport
Pontypridd CC	73,743	Mid Glamorgan	Rhondda Cynon Taff
Rhondda and Ogmore CC	73,557	Mid Glamorgan	Bridgend / Rhondda Cynon Taff
Swansea West CC	74,612	West Glamorgan	Swansea
Torfaen CC	70,591	Gwent	Torfaen
Vale of Glamorgan CC	70,426	South Glamorgan	Vale of Glamorgan
Wrexham CC	70,964	Clwyd	Wrexham
Ynys Môn CC	52,415	Gwynedd	Isle of Anglesey

== Northern Ireland ==
Map of the 18 constituencies in Northern Ireland.

Northern Ireland
Constituency
Belfast East BC
Belfast North BC
Belfast South and Mid Down BC
Belfast West BC
East Antrim CC
East Londonderry CC
Fermanagh and South Tyrone CC
Foyle CC
Lagan Valley CC
Mid Ulster CC
Newry and Armagh CC
North Antrim CC
North Down CC
South Antrim CC
South Down CC
Strangford CC
Upper Bann CC
West Tyrone CC
