= List of United Kingdom Parliament constituencies (1974–1983) by region =

Constituencies 1950–1974 | Feb 1974 MPs | Oct 1974 MPs | 1979 MPs | Constituencies 1983–1997

This is a list of all constituencies that were in existence at the February 1974, October 1974 and 1979 General Elections, showing the winning party and broken down by region and county.

1801 to 1832
1832 to 1868
1868 to 1885
1885 to 1918
1918 to 1950
1950 to 1974
1974 to 1983
1983 to 1997
1997 to 2024
2024 to present

== South West (43) ==
=== Cornwall (5) ===
Constituency	Feb 1974	Oct 1974	1979
Bodmin	Liberal	Conservative	Conservative
Cornwall North	Liberal	Liberal	Conservative
Falmouth and Camborne	Conservative	Conservative	Conservative
St Ives	Conservative	Conservative	Conservative
Truro	Conservative	Liberal	Liberal

=== Devon (10) ===
Constituency	Feb 1974	Oct 1974	1979
Devon North	Liberal	Liberal	Conservative
Devon West	Conservative	Conservative	Conservative
Exeter	Conservative	Conservative	Conservative
Honiton	Conservative	Conservative	Conservative
Plymouth Devonport	Labour	Labour	Labou
Plymouth Drake	Conservative	Conservative	Conservative
Plymouth Sutton	Conservative	Conservative	Conservative
Tiverton	Conservative	Conservative	Conservative
Torbay	Conservative	Conservative	Conservative
Totnes	Conservative	Conservative	Conservative

=== Somerset (7) ===
Constituency	Feb 1974	Oct 1974	1979
Bath	Conservative	Conservative	Conservative
Bridgwater	Conservative	Conservative	Conservative
Somerset North	Conservative	Conservative	Conservative
Taunton	Conservative	Conservative	Conservative
Wells	Conservative	Conservative	Conservative
Weston-super-Mare	Conservative	Conservative	Conservative
Yeovil	Conservative	Conservative	Conservative

=== Dorset (4) ===
Constituency	Feb 1974	Oct 1974	1979
Dorset North	Conservative	Conservative	Conservative
Dorset South	Conservative	Conservative	Conservative
Dorset West	Conservative	Conservative	Conservative
Poole	Conservative	Conservative	Conservative

=== Gloucestershire (12) ===
Constituency	Feb 1974	Oct 1974	1979
Bristol North East	Labour Co-op	Labour Co-op	Labour Co-op
Bristol North West	Conservative	Labour	Conservative
Bristol South	Labour	Labour	Labour
Bristol South East	Labour	Labour	Labour
Bristol West	Conservative	Conservative	Conservative
Cheltenham	Conservative	Conservative	Conservative
Cirencester and Tewkesbury	Conservative	Conservative	Conservative
Gloucester	Conservative	Conservative	Conservative
Gloucestershire South	Conservative	Conservative	Conservative
Gloucestershire West	Labour	Labour	Conservative
Kingswood	Labour	Labour	Conservative
Stroud	Conservative	Conservative	Conservative

=== Wiltshire (5) ===
Constituency	Feb 1974	Oct 1974	1979
Chippenham	Conservative	Conservative	Conservative
Devizes	Conservative	Conservative	Conservative
Salisbury	Conservative	Conservative	Conservative
Swindon	Labour	Labour	Labour
Westbury	Conservative	Conservative	Conservative

== South East (73) ==
=== Oxfordshire (4) ===
Constituency	Feb 1974	Oct 1974	1979
Banbury	Conservative	Conservative	Conservative
Henley	Conservative	Conservative	Conservative
Oxford	Conservative	Labour	Conservative
Oxfordshire Mid	Conservative	Conservative	Conservative

=== Buckinghamshire (6) ===
Constituency	Feb 1974	Oct 1974	1979
Aylesbury	Conservative	Conservative	Conservative
Beaconsfield	Conservative	Conservative	Conservative
Buckingham	Conservative	Conservative	Conservative
Chesham and Amersham	Conservative	Conservative	Conservative
Eton and Slough	Labour	Labour	Labour
Wycombe	Conservative	Conservative	Conservative

=== Berkshire (6) ===
Constituency	Feb 1974	Oct 1974	1979
Abingdon	Conservative	Conservative	Conservative
Newbury	Conservative	Conservative	Conservative
Reading North	Conservative	Conservative	Conservative
Reading South	Conservative	Conservative	Conservative
Windsor and Maidenhead	Conservative	Conservative	Conservative
Wokingham	Conservative	Conservative	Conservative

=== Hampshire (16) ===
Constituency	Feb 1974	Oct 1974	1979
Aldershot	Conservative	Conservative	Conservative
Basingstoke	Conservative	Conservative	Conservative
Bournemouth East	Conservative	Conservative	Conservative
Bournemouth West	Conservative	Conservative	Conservative
Christchurch and Lymington	Conservative	Conservative	Conservative
Eastleigh	Conservative	Conservative	Conservative
Fareham	Conservative	Conservative	Conservative
Gosport	Conservative	Conservative	Conservative
Havant and Waterloo	Conservative	Conservative	Conservative
New Forest	Conservative	Conservative	Conservative
Petersfield	Conservative	Conservative	Conservative
Portsmouth North	Labour	Labour	Conservative
Portsmouth South	Conservative	Conservative	Conservative
Southampton Itchen	Labour	Labour	Labour
Southampton Test	Conservative	Labour	Conservative
Winchester	Conservative	Conservative	Conservative

=== Isle of Wight (1) ===
Constituency	Feb 1974	Oct 1974	1979
Isle of Wight	Liberal	Liberal	Liberal

=== Surrey (11) ===
Constituency	Feb 1974	Oct 1974	1979
Chertsey and Walton	Conservative	Conservative	Conservative
Dorking	Conservative	Conservative	Conservative
Epsom and Ewell	Conservative	Conservative	Conservative
Esher	Conservative	Conservative	Conservative
Farnham	Conservative	Conservative	Conservative
Guildford	Conservative	Conservative	Conservative
Reigate	Conservative	Conservative	Conservative
Spelthorne	Conservative	Conservative	Conservative
Surrey East	Conservative	Conservative	Conservative
Surrey North West	Conservative	Conservative	Conservative
Woking	Conservative	Conservative	Conservative

=== Sussex (14) ===
Constituency	Feb 1974	Oct 1974	1979
Arundel	Conservative	Conservative	Conservative
Brighton Kemptown	Conservative	Conservative	Conservative
Brighton Pavilion	Conservative	Conservative	Conservative
Chichester	Conservative	Conservative	Conservative
Eastbourne	Conservative	Conservative	Conservative
East Grinstead	Conservative	Conservative	Conservative
Hastings	Conservative	Conservative	Conservative
Horsham and Crawley	Conservative	Conservative	Conservative
Hove	Conservative	Conservative	Conservative
Lewes	Conservative	Conservative	Conservative
Rye	Conservative	Conservative	Conservative
Shoreham	Conservative	Conservative	Conservative
Sussex Mid	Conservative	Conservative	Conservative
Worthing	Conservative	Conservative	Conservative

=== Kent (15) ===
Constituency	Feb 1974	Oct 1974	1979
Ashford	Conservative	Conservative	Conservative
Canterbury	Conservative	Conservative	Conservative
Dartford	Labour Co-op	Labour Co-op	Conservative
Dover and Deal	Conservative	Conservative	Conservative
Faversham	Conservative	Conservative	Conservative
Folkestone and Hythe	Conservative	Conservative	Conservative
Gillingham	Conservative	Conservative	Conservative
Gravesend	Labour	Labour	Conservative
Maidstone	Conservative	Conservative	Conservative
Rochester and Chatham	Conservative	Labour	Conservative
Sevenoaks	Conservative	Conservative	Conservative
Thanet East	Conservative	Conservative	Conservative
Thanet West	Conservative	Conservative	Conservative
Tonbridge and Malling	Conservative	Conservative	Conservative
Tunbridge Wells	Conservative	Conservative	Conservative

== Greater London (92) ==
=== North West London (26) ===
The boroughs of Hillingdon, Harrow, Brent, Ealing, Barnet, Camden, Hammersmith & Fulham, Kensington & Chelsea, Westminster and the City of London.

Constituency	Feb 1974	Oct 1974	1979
Brent East	Labour	Labour	Labour
Brent North	Conservative	Conservative	Conservative
Brent South	Labour Co-op	Labour Co-op	Labour Co-op
Chelsea	Conservative	Conservative	Conservative
Chipping Barnet	Conservative	Conservative	Conservative
City of London and Westminster South	Conservative	Conservative	Conservative
Ealing Acton	Conservative	Conservative	Conservative
Ealing North	Labour	Labour	Conservative
Finchley	Conservative	Conservative	Conservative
Fulham	Labour	Labour	Conservative
Hammersmith North	Labour	Labour	Labour
Hampstead	Conservative	Conservative	Conservative
Harrow Central	Conservative	Conservative	Conservative
Harrow East	Conservative	Conservative	Conservative
Harrow West	Conservative	Conservative	Conservative
Hayes and Harlington	Labour	Labour	Labour
Hendon North	Conservative	Conservative	Conservative
Hendon South	Conservative	Conservative	Conservative
Holborn and St Pancras	Labour	Labour	Labour
Kensington	Conservative	Conservative	Conservative
Paddington	Labour	Labour	Conservative
Ruislip and Northwood	Conservative	Conservative	Conservative
St Marylebone	Conservative	Conservative	Conservative
St Pancras North	Labour	Labour	Labour
Southall	Labour	Labour	Labour
Uxbridge	Conservative	Conservative	Conservative

=== North East London (28) ===
The boroughs of Barking & Dagenham, Enfield, Hackney, Haringey, Havering, Islington, Newham, Redbridge, Tower Hamlets and Waltham Forest.

Constituency	Feb 1974	Oct 1974	1979
Barking	Labour	Labour	Labour
Bethnal Green and Bow	Labour	Labour	Labour
Chingford	Conservative	Conservative	Conservative
Dagenham	Labour	Labour	Labour
Edmonton	Labour Co-op	Labour Co-op	Labour Co-op
Enfield North	Labour	Labour	Conservative
Hackney Central	Labour	Labour	Labour
Hackney North and Stoke Newington	Labour	Labour	Labour
Hackney South and Shoreditch	Labour	Labour	Labour
Hornchurch	Labour	Labour	Conservative
Hornsey	Conservative	Conservative	Conservative
Ilford North	Conservative	Labour	Conservative
Ilford South	Labour	Labour	Conservative
Islington Central	Labour	Labour	Labour
Islington North	Labour	Labour	Labour
Islington South and Finsbury	Labour	Labour	Labour
Leyton	Labour	Labour	Labour
Newham North East	Labour	Labour	Labour
Newham North West	Labour	Labour	Labour
Newham South	Labour	Labour	Labour
Romford	Conservative	Conservative	Conservative
Southgate	Conservative	Conservative	Conservative
Stepney and Poplar	Labour	Labour	Labour
Tottenham	Labour	Labour	Labour
Upminster	Conservative	Conservative	Conservative
Walthamstow	Labour	Labour	Labour
Wanstead and Woodford	Conservative	Conservative	Conservative
Wood Green	Labour Co-op	Labour Co-op	Labour

=== South West London (18) ===
The boroughs of Croydon, Hounslow, Kingston, Merton, Richmond, Sutton and Wandsworth.

Constituency	Feb 1974	Oct 1974	1979
Battersea North	Labour	Labour	Labour
Battersea South	Labour	Labour	Labour
Brentford and Isleworth	Conservative	Conservative	Conservative
Carshalton	Conservative	Conservative	Conservative
Croydon Central	Conservative	Conservative	Conservative
Croydon North East	Conservative	Conservative	Conservative
Croydon North West	Conservative	Conservative	Conservative
Croydon South	Conservative	Conservative	Conservative
Feltham and Heston	Labour	Labour	Labour
Kingston upon Thames	Conservative	Conservative	Conservative
Mitcham and Morden	Labour	Labour	Labour
Putney	Labour	Labour	Conservative
Richmond upon Thames	Conservative	Conservative	Conservative
Surbiton	Conservative	Conservative	Conservative
Sutton and Cheam	Conservative	Conservative	Conservative
Tooting	Labour	Labour	Labour
Twickenham	Conservative	Conservative	Conservative
Wimbledon	Conservative	Conservative	Conservative

=== South East London (20) ===
The boroughs of Bexley, Bromley, Greenwich, Lambeth, Lewisham and Southwark.

Constituency	Feb 1974	Oct 1974	1979
Beckenham	Conservative	Conservative	Conservative
Bermondsey	Labour	Labour	Labour
Bexleyheath	Conservative	Conservative	Conservative
Chislehurst	Conservative	Conservative	Conservative
Deptford	Labour	Labour	Labour
Dulwich	Labour	Labour	Labour
Erith and Crayford	Labour	Labour	Labour
Greenwich	Labour	Labour	Labour
Lambeth Central	Labour	Labour	Labour Co-op
Lewisham East	Labour	Labour	Labour
Lewisham West	Labour	Labour	Labour
Norwood	Labour	Labour	Labour
Orpington	Conservative	Conservative	Conservative
Peckham	Labour	Labour	Labour
Ravensbourne	Conservative	Conservative	Conservative
Sidcup	Conservative	Conservative	Conservative
Streatham	Conservative	Conservative	Conservative
Vauxhall	Labour	Labour	Labour
Woolwich East	Labour	Labour	Labour
Woolwich West	Labour	Labour	Conservative

== East Anglia (45) ==
=== Bedfordshire (5) ===
Constituency	Feb 1974	Oct 1974	1979
Bedford	Conservative	Conservative	Conservative
Bedfordshire Mid	Conservative	Conservative	Conservative
Bedfordshire South	Conservative	Conservative	Conservative
Luton East	Labour	Labour	Conservative
Luton West	Labour	Labour	Conservative

=== Hertfordshire (9) ===
Constituency	Feb 1974	Oct 1974	1979
Hemel Hempstead	Conservative	Labour	Conservative
Hertford and Stevenage	Labour	Labour	Conservative
Hertfordshire East	Conservative	Conservative	Conservative
Hertfordshire South	Conservative	Conservative	Conservative
Hertfordshire South West	Conservative	Conservative	Conservative
Hitchin	Conservative	Conservative	Conservative
St Albans	Conservative	Conservative	Conservative
Watford	Labour	Labour	Conservative
Welwyn and Hatfield	Conservative	Labour	Conservative

=== Huntingdonshire and Peterborough (2) ===
Constituency	Feb 1974	Oct 1974	1979
Huntingdonshire	Conservative	Conservative	Conservative
Peterborough	Conservative	Labour	Conservative

=== Cambridgeshire and Isle of Ely (3) ===
Constituency	Feb 1974	Oct 1974	1979
Cambridge	Conservative	Conservative	Conservative
Cambridgeshire	Conservative	Conservative	Conservative
Isle of Ely	Liberal	Liberal	Liberal

=== Norfolk (7) ===
Constituency	Feb 1974	Oct 1974	1979
Norfolk North	Conservative	Conservative	Conservative
Norfolk North West	Conservative	Conservative	Conservative
Norfolk South	Conservative	Conservative	Conservative
Norfolk South West	Conservative	Conservative	Conservative
Norwich North	Labour	Labour	Labour
Norwich South	Labour	Labour	Labour
Yarmouth	Conservative	Conservative	Conservative

=== Suffolk (5) ===
Constituency	Feb 1974	Oct 1974	1979
Bury St Edmunds	Conservative	Conservative	Conservative
Eye	Conservative	Conservative	Conservative
Ipswich	Conservative	Labour	Labour
Lowestoft	Conservative	Conservative	Conservative
Sudbury and Woodbridge	Conservative	Conservative	Conservative

=== Essex (14) ===
Constituency	Feb 1974	Oct 1974	1979
Basildon	Labour	Labour	Conservative
Braintree	Conservative	Conservative	Conservative
Brentwood and Ongar	Conservative	Conservative	Conservative
Chelmsford	Conservative	Conservative	Conservative
Colchester	Conservative	Conservative	Conservative
Epping Forest	Conservative	Conservative	Conservative
Essex South East	Conservative	Conservative	Conservative
Harlow	Labour Co-op	Labour Co-op	Labour Co-op
Harwich	Conservative	Conservative	Conservative
Maldon	Conservative	Conservative	Conservative
Saffron Walden	Conservative	Conservative	Conservative
Southend East	Conservative	Conservative	Conservative
Southend West	Conservative	Conservative	Conservative
Thurrock	Labour	Labour	Labour

== East Midlands (42) ==
=== Derbyshire (10) ===
Constituency	Feb 1974	Oct 1974	1979
Belper	Labour	Labour	Conservative
Bolsover	Labour	Labour	Labour
Chesterfield	Labour	Labour	Labour
Derby North	Labour	Labour	Labour
Derby South	Labour	Labour	Labour
Derbyshire North East	Labour	Labour	Labour
Derbyshire South East	Conservative	Conservative	Conservative
Derbyshire West	Conservative	Conservative	Conservative
High Peak	Conservative	Conservative	Conservative
Ilkeston	Labour	Labour	Labour

=== Nottinghamshire (10) ===
Constituency	Feb 1974	Oct 1974	1979
Ashfield	Labour	Labour	Labour
Bassetlaw	Labour	Labour	Labour
Beeston	Conservative	Conservative	Conservative
Carlton	Conservative	Conservative	Conservative
Mansfield	Labour	Labour	Labour
Newark	Labour	Labour	Conservative
Nottingham East	Labour	Labour	Labour
Nottingham North	Labour	Labour	Labour
Nottingham West	Labour	Labour	Labour
Rushcliffe	Conservative	Conservative	Conservative

=== Lincolnshire and Rutland (9) ===
Constituency	Feb 1974	Oct 1974	1979
Brigg and Scunthorpe	Labour	Labour	Conservative
Gainsborough	Conservative	Conservative	Conservative
Grantham	Conservative	Conservative	Conservative
Grimsby	Labour	Labour	Labour
Holland and Boston	Conservative	Conservative	Conservative
Horncastle	Conservative	Conservative	Conservative
Lincoln	Democratic Labour	Labour	Conservative
Louth	Conservative	Conservative	Conservative
Rutland and Stamford	Conservative	Conservative	Conservative

=== Leicestershire (8) ===
Constituency	Feb 1974	Oct 1974	1979
Blaby	Conservative	Conservative	Conservative
Bosworth	Conservative	Conservative	Conservative
Harborough	Conservative	Conservative	Conservative
Leicester East	Labour	Labour	Labour
Leicester South	Conservative	Labour	Labour
Leicester West	Labour	Labour	Labour
Loughborough	Labour	Labour	Conservative
Melton	Conservative	Conservative	Conservative

=== Northamptonshire (5) ===
Constituency	Feb 1974	Oct 1974	1979
Daventry	Conservative	Conservative	Conservative
Kettering	Labour	Labour	Labour
Northampton North	Labour	Labour	Conservative
Northampton South	Conservative	Conservative	Conservative
Wellingborough	Conservative	Conservative	Conservative

== West Midlands (56) ==
=== Shropshire (4) ===
Constituency	Feb 1974	Oct 1974	1979
Ludlow	Conservative	Conservative	Conservative
Oswestry	Conservative	Conservative	Conservative
Shrewsbury	Conservative	Conservative	Conservative
The Wrekin	Labour	Labour	Conservative

=== Staffordshire (18) ===
Constituency	Feb 1974	Oct 1974	1979
Aldridge-Brownhills	Labour	Labour	Conservative
Burton	Conservative	Conservative	Conservative
Cannock	Labour	Labour	Labour
Leek	Conservative	Conservative	Conservative
Lichfield and Tamworth	Conservative	Labour	Conservative
Newcastle-under-Lyme	Labour	Labour	Labour
Stafford and Stone	Conservative	Conservative	Conservative
Staffordshire South West	Conservative	Conservative	Conservative
Stoke-on-Trent Central	Labour	Labour	Labour
Stoke-on-Trent North	Labour	Labour	Labour
Stoke-on-Trent South	Labour	Labour	Labour
Walsall North	Labour Co-op	Labour Co-op	Labour
Walsall South	Labour	Labour	Labour
West Bromwich East	Labour	Labour	Labour
West Bromwich West	Labour	Labour	Labour
Wolverhampton North East	Labour	Labour	Labour
Wolverhampton South East	Labour Co-op	Labour Co-op	Labour Co-op
Wolverhampton South West	Conservative	Conservative	Conservative

=== Herefordshire (2) ===
Constituency	Feb 1974	Oct 1974	1979
Hereford	Conservative	Conservative	Conservative
Leominster	Conservative	Conservative	Conservative

=== Worcestershire (9) ===
Constituency	Feb 1974	Oct 1974	1979
Bromsgrove and Redditch	Conservative	Conservative	Conservative
Dudley East	Labour	Labour	Labour
Dudley West	Labour	Labour	Conservative
Halesowen and Stourbridge	Conservative	Conservative	Conservative
Kidderminster	Conservative	Conservative	Conservative
Warley East	Labour	Labour	Labour
Warley West	Labour	Labour	Labour
Worcester	Conservative	Conservative	Conservative
Worcestershire South	Conservative	Conservative	Conservative

=== Warwickshire (23) ===
Constituency	Feb 1974	Oct 1974	1979
Birmingham Edgbaston	Conservative	Conservative	Conservative
Birmingham Erdington	Labour	Labour	Labour
Birmingham Hall Green	Conservative	Conservative	Conservative
Birmingham Handsworth	Labour	Labour	Labour
Birmingham Ladywood	Labour	Labour	Labour
Birmingham Northfield	Labour	Labour	Conservative
Birmingham Perry Barr	Labour	Labour	Labour
Birmingham Selly Oak	Conservative	Labour	Conservative
Birmingham Small Heath	Labour	Labour	Labour
Birmingham Sparkbrook	Labour	Labour	Labour
Birmingham Stechford	Labour	Labour	Labour
Birmingham Yardley	Labour	Labour	Conservative
Coventry North East	Labour	Labour	Labour
Coventry North West	Labour	Labour	Labour
Coventry South East	Labour	Labour	Labour
Coventry South West	Labour	Labour	Conservative
Meriden	Labour	Labour	Conservative
Nuneaton	Labour	Labour	Labour
Rugby	Labour	Labour	Conservative
Solihull	Conservative	Conservative	Conservative
Stratford-on-Avon	Conservative	Conservative	Conservative
Sutton Coldfield	Conservative	Conservative	Conservative
Warwick and Leamington	Conservative	Conservative	Conservative

== North West (82) ==
=== Cumberland (4) ===
Constituency	Feb 1974	Oct 1974	1979
Carlisle	Labour	Labour	Labour
Penrith and the Border	Conservative	Conservative	Conservative
Whitehaven	Labour	Labour	Labour
Workington	Labour	Labour	Labour

=== Westmorland (1) ===
Constituency	Feb 1974	Oct 1974	1979
Westmorland	Conservative	Conservative	Conservative

=== Lancashire (59) ===
Constituency	Feb 1974	Oct 1974	1979	Destination
Accrington	Labour	Labour	Labour	Lancashire
Ashton-under-Lyne	Labour	Labour	Labour	Manchester
Bury and Radcliffe	Conservative	Labour	Labour	Manchester
Burnley	Labour	Labour	Labour	Lancashire
Bootle	Labour	Labour	Labour	Merseyside
Bolton West	Conservative	Labour	Labour	Manchester
Bolton East	Labour	Labour	Labour	Manchester
Blackpool South	Conservative	Conservative	Conservative	Lancashire
Blackpool North	Conservative	Conservative	Conservative	Lancashire
Blackburn	Labour	Labour	Labour	Lancashire
Barrow-in-Furness	Labour	Labour	Labour	Cumbria
Chorley	Labour	Labour	Conservative	Lancashire
Clitheroe	Conservative	Conservative	Conservative	Lancashire
Crosby	Conservative	Conservative	Conservative	Merseyside
Darwen	Conservative	Conservative	Conservative	Lancashire
Eccles	Labour	Labour	Labour	Manchester
Farnworth	Labour	Labour	Labour	Manchester
Fylde North	Conservative	Conservative	Conservative	Lancashire
Fylde South	Conservative	Conservative	Conservative	Lancashire
Heywood and Royton	Labour	Labour	Labour	Manchester
Huyton	Labour	Labour	Labour	Merseyside
Lancaster	Conservative	Conservative	Conservative	Lancashire
Leigh	Labour	Labour	Labour	Manchester
Liverpool Edge Hill	Labour	Labour	Liberal	Merseyside
Liverpool Garston	Labour	Labour	Conservative	Merseyside
Liverpool Kirkdale	Labour	Labour	Labour	Merseyside
Liverpool Scotland Exchange	Labour	Labour	Labour	Merseyside
Liverpool Toxteth	Labour	Labour	Labour	Merseyside
Liverpool Walton	Labour	Labour	Labour	Merseyside
Liverpool Wavertree	Conservative	Conservative	Conservative	Merseyside
Liverpool West Derby	Labour	Labour	Labour	Merseyside
Manchester Ardwick	Labour	Labour	Labour	Manchester
Manchester Blackley	Labour	Labour	Labour	Manchester
Manchester Central	Labour	Labour	Labour	Manchester
Manchester Gorton	Labour	Labour	Labour	Manchester
Manchester Moss Side	Labour	Labour	Labour	Manchester
Manchester Openshaw	Labour	Labour	Labour	Manchester
Manchester Withington	Conservative	Conservative	Conservative	Manchester
Manchester Wythenshawe	Labour Co-op	Labour Co-op	Labour Co-op	Manchester
Middleton and Prestwich	Labour	Labour	Labour	Manchester
Morecambe and Lonsdale	Conservative	Conservative	Conservative	Lancashire
Nelson and Colne	Conservative	Labour	Conservative	Lancashire
Newton	Labour	Labour	Labour	Merseyside/Manchester
Oldham East	Labour	Labour	Labour	Manchester
Oldham West	Labour	Labour	Labour	Manchester
Ormskirk	Labour	Labour	Labour	Merseyside/Lancashire
Preston North	Labour	Labour	Conservative	Lancashire
Preston South	Labour	Labour	Labour	Lancashire
Rochdale	Liberal	Liberal	Liberal	Manchester
Rossendale	Conservative	Labour	Conservative	Lancashire
St Helens	Labour	Labour	Labour	Merseyside
Salford East	Labour	Labour	Labour	Manchester
Salford West	Labour	Labour	Labour	Manchester
Southport	Conservative	Conservative	Conservative	Merseyside
Stretford	Conservative	Conservative	Conservative	Manchester
Warrington	Labour Co-op	Labour Co-op	Labour Co-op	Cheshire
Westhoughton	Labour	Labour	Labour	Manchester
Widnes	Labour	Labour	Labour	Cheshire
Wigan	Labour	Labour	Labour	Manchester

=== Cheshire (18) ===
Constituency	Feb 1974	Oct 1974	1979	Destination
Altrincham and Sale	Conservative	Conservative	Conservative	Manchester
Bebington and Ellesmere Port	Labour	Labour	Conservative	Cheshire
Birkenhead	Labour	Labour	Labour	Merseyside
Cheadle	Conservative	Conservative	Conservative	Manchester
City of Chester	Conservative	Conservative	Conservative	Cheshire
Crewe	Labour	Labour	Labour	Cheshire
Hazel Grove	Liberal	Conservative	Conservative	Manchester
Ince	Labour	Labour	Labour	Manchester
Knutsford	Conservative	Conservative	Conservative	Cheshire
Macclesfield	Conservative	Conservative	Conservative	Cheshire
Nantwich	Conservative	Conservative	Conservative	Cheshire
Northwich	Conservative	Conservative	Conservative	Cheshire
Runcorn	Conservative	Conservative	Conservative	Cheshire
Stalybridge and Hyde	Labour	Labour	Labour	Manchester
Stockport North	Labour	Labour	Labour	Manchester
Stockport South	Labour	Labour	Labour	Manchester
Wallasey	Conservative	Conservative	Conservative	Merseyside
Wirral	Speaker	Speaker	Conservative	Merseyside

== North East (27) ==
=== Northumberland (10) ===
Constituency	Feb 1974	Oct 1974	1979
Berwick-upon-Tweed	Liberal	Liberal	Liberal
Blyth	Independent Labour	Labour	Labour
Hexham	Conservative	Conservative	Conservative
Morpeth	Labour	Labour	Labour
Newcastle upon Tyne Central	Labour	Labour	Labour
Newcastle upon Tyne East	Labour Co-op	Labour Co-op	Labour Co-op
Newcastle upon Tyne North	Conservative	Conservative	Conservative
Newcastle upon Tyne West	Labour	Labour	Labour
Tynemouth	Conservative	Conservative	Conservative
Wallsend	Labour	Labour	Labour

=== County Durham (17) ===
Constituency	Feb 1974	Oct 1974	1979
Bishop Auckland	Labour	Labour	Labour
Blaydon	Labour	Labour	Labour
Chester-le-Street	Labour	Labour	Labour
Consett	Labour	Labour	Labour
Darlington	Labour	Labour	Labour
Durham	Labour	Labour	Labour
Durham North West	Labour	Labour	Labour
Easington	Labour	Labour	Labour
Gateshead East	Labour	Labour	Labour
Gateshead West	Labour	Labour	Labour
Hartlepool	Labour	Labour	Labour
Houghton-le-Spring	Labour	Labour	Labour
Jarrow	Labour	Labour	Labour
South Shields	Labour	Labour	Labour
Stockton	Labour	Labour	Labour
Sunderland North	Labour	Labour	Labour
Sunderland South	Labour	Labour	Labour

== Yorkshire (56) ==
=== York (1) ===
Constituency	Feb 1974	Oct 1974	1979
York	Labour	Labour	Labour

=== North Riding (8) ===
Constituency	Feb 1974	Oct 1974	1979
Cleveland and Whitby	Conservative	Conservative	Conservative
Harrogate	Conservative	Conservative	Conservative
Middlesbrough	Labour	Labour	Labour
Redcar	Labour	Labour	Labour
Richmond (Yorks)	Conservative	Conservative	Conservative
Scarborough	Conservative	Conservative	Conservative
Thirsk and Malton	Conservative	Conservative	Conservative
Thornaby	Labour Co-op	Labour Co-op	Labour Co-op

=== West Riding (40) ===
Constituency	Feb 1974	Oct 1974	1979
Barkston Ash	Conservative	Conservative	Conservative
Barnsley	Labour	Labour	Labour
Batley and Morley	Labour	Labour	Labour
Bradford North	Labour	Labour	Labour
Bradford South	Labour	Labour	Labour
Bradford West	Labour	Labour	Labour
Brighouse and Spenborough	Labour	Labour	Conservative
Colne Valley	Liberal	Liberal	Liberal
Dearne Valley	Labour	Labour	Labour
Dewsbury	Labour	Labour	Labour
Doncaster	Labour	Labour	Labour
Don Valley	Labour	Labour	Labour
Halifax	Labour	Labour	Labour
Hemsworth	Labour	Labour	Labour
Huddersfield East	Labour	Labour	Labour Co-op
Huddersfield West	Labour	Labour	Conservative
Keighley	Labour	Labour	Labour
Leeds East	Labour	Labour	Labour
Leeds North East	Conservative	Conservative	Conservative
Leeds North West	Conservative	Conservative	Conservative
Leeds South	Labour	Labour	Labour
Leeds South East	Labour	Labour	Labour
Leeds West	Labour	Labour	Labour
Normanton	Labour	Labour	Labour
Penistone	Labour	Labour	Labour
Pontefract and Castleford	Labour	Labour	Labour
Pudsey	Conservative	Conservative	Conservative
Ripon	Conservative	Conservative	Conservative
Rotherham	Labour	Labour	Labour
Rother Valley	Labour	Labour	Labour
Sheffield Attercliffe	Labour	Labour	Labour
Sheffield Brightside	Labour	Labour	Labour
Sheffield Hallam	Conservative	Conservative	Conservative
Sheffield Heeley	Labour	Labour	Labour
Sheffield Hillsborough	Labour	Labour	Labour
Sheffield Park	Labour	Labour	Labour
Shipley	Conservative	Conservative	Conservative
Skipton	Conservative	Conservative	Conservative
Sowerby	Labour	Labour	Conservative
Wakefield	Labour	Labour	Labour

=== East Riding (7) ===
Constituency	Feb 1974	Oct 1974	1979
Bridlington	Conservative	Conservative	Conservative
Goole	Labour	Labour	Labour
Haltemprice	Conservative	Conservative	Conservative
Howden	Conservative	Conservative	Conservative
Kingston upon Hull Central	Labour	Labour	Labour
Kingston upon Hull East	Labour	Labour	Labour
Kingston upon Hull West	Labour	Labour	Labour

== Wales (36) ==
=== Anglesey (1) ===
Constituency	Feb 1974	Oct 1974	1979
Anglesey	Labour	Labour	Conservative

=== Carnarvonshire (2) ===
Constituency	Feb 1974	Oct 1974	1979
Caernarfon	Plaid Cymru	Plaid Cymru	Plaid Cymru
Conway	Conservative	Conservative	Conservative

=== Denbighshire (2) ===
Constituency	Feb 1974	Oct 1974	1979
Denbigh	Conservative	Conservative	Conservative
Wrexham	Labour	Labour	Labour

=== Flintshire (2) ===
Constituency	Feb 1974	Oct 1974	1979
Flintshire East	Labour Co-op	Labour Co-op	Labour
Flintshire West	Conservative	Conservative	Conservative

=== Merionethshire (1) ===
Constituency	Feb 1974	Oct 1974	1979
Merionethshire	Plaid Cymru	Plaid Cymru	Plaid Cymru

=== Montgomeryshire (1) ===
Constituency	Feb 1974	Oct 1974	1979
Montgomeryshire	Liberal	Liberal	Conservative

=== Cardiganshire (1) ===
Constituency	Feb 1974	Oct 1974	1979
Cardigan	Liberal	Liberal	Liberal

=== Pembrokeshire (1) ===
Constituency	Feb 1974	Oct 1974	1979
Pembroke	Conservative	Conservative	Conservative

=== Carmarthenshire (2) ===
Constituency	Feb 1974	Oct 1974	1979
Carmarthen	Labour	Plaid Cymru	Labour
Llanelli	Labour	Labour	Labour

=== Breconshire and Radnorshire (1) ===
Constituency	Feb 1974	Oct 1974	1979
Brecon and Radnorshire	Labour	Labour	Conservative

=== Glamorgan (16) ===
Constituency	Feb 1974	Oct 1974	1979
Aberavon	Labour	Labour	Labour
Aberdare	Labour Co-op	Labour Co-op	Labour Co-op
Barry	Conservative	Conservative	Conservative
Caerphilly	Labour	Labour	Labour
Cardiff North	Conservative	Conservative	Conservative
Cardiff North West	Conservative	Conservative	Conservative
Cardiff South East	Labour	Labour	Labour
Cardiff West	Labour	Labour	Labour
Gower	Labour	Labour	Labour
Merthyr Tydfil	Labour	Labour	Labour
Neath	Labour	Labour	Labour
Ogmore	Labour	Labour	Labour
Pontypridd	Labour	Labour	Labour
Rhondda	Labour	Labour	Labour
Swansea East	Labour	Labour	Labour
Swansea West	Labour	Labour	Labour

=== Monmouthshire (6) ===
Constituency	Feb 1974	Oct 1974	1979
Abertillery	Labour	Labour	Labour
Bedwellty	Labour	Labour	Labour
Ebbw Vale	Labour	Labour	Labour
Monmouth	Conservative	Conservative	Conservative
Newport	Labour	Labour	Labour
Pontypool	Labour	Labour	Labour

== Scotland (71) ==
=== Orkney and Shetland (1) ===
Constituency	Feb 1974	Oct 1974	1979
Orkney and Shetland	Liberal	Liberal	Liberal

=== Caithness and Sutherland (1) ===
Constituency	Feb 1974	Oct 1974	1979
Caithness and Sutherland	Labour	Labour	Labour

=== Inverness-shire and Ross and Cromarty (3) ===
Constituency	Feb 1974	Oct 1974	1979
Inverness	Liberal	Liberal	Liberal
Ross and Cromarty	Conservative	Conservative	Conservative
Western Isles	SNP	SNP	SNP

=== Moray and Nairnshire (1) ===
Constituency	Feb 1974	Oct 1974	1979
Moray and Nairn	SNP	SNP	Conservative

=== Banffshire (1) ===
Constituency	Feb 1974	Oct 1974	1979
Banff	SNP	SNP	Conservative

=== Aberdeenshire (4) ===
Constituency	Feb 1974	Oct 1974	1979
Aberdeen North	Labour	Labour	Labour
Aberdeen South	Conservative	Conservative	Conservative
East Aberdeenshire	SNP	SNP	Conservative
West Aberdeenshire	Conservative	Conservative	Conservative

=== Angus and Kincardineshire (4) ===
Constituency	Feb 1974	Oct 1974	1979
North Angus and Mearns	Conservative	Conservative	Conservative
South Angus	Conservative	SNP	Conservative
Dundee East	SNP	SNP	SNP
Dundee West	Labour	Labour	Labour

=== Argyll (1) ===
Constituency	Feb 1974	Oct 1974	1979
Argyll	SNP	SNP	Conservative

=== Perthshire and Kinross-shire (2) ===
Constituency	Feb 1974	Oct 1974	1979
Kinross and West Perthshire	Conservative	Conservative	Conservative
Perth and East Perthshire	Conservative	SNP	Conservative

=== Ayrshire and Bute (5) ===
Constituency	Feb 1974	Oct 1974	1979
Ayr	Conservative	Conservative	Conservative
Ayrshire Central	Labour	Labour	Labour
Ayrshire North and Bute	Conservative	Conservative	Conservative
Ayrshire South	Labour	Labour	Labour Co-op
Kilmarnock	Labour	Labour	Labour

=== Renfrewshire (4) ===
Constituency	Feb 1974	Oct 1974	1979
Greenock and Port Glasgow	Labour Co-op	Labour Co-op	Labour Co-op
Paisley	Labour	Labour	Labour
Renfrewshire East	Conservative	Conservative	Conservative
Renfrewshire West	Labour	Labour	Labour

=== Dunbartonshire (3) ===
Constituency	Feb 1974	Oct 1974	1979
Dunbartonshire Central	Labour	Labour	Labour
Dunbartonshire East	Conservative	SNP	Labour
Dunbartonshire West	Labour	Labour	Labour

=== Stirlingshire and Clackmannanshire (3) ===
Constituency	Feb 1974	Oct 1974	1979
Stirling, Falkirk and Grangemouth	Labour	Labour	Labour
Stirlingshire East and Clackmannan	SNP	SNP	Labour
Stirlingshire West	Labour	Labour	Labour

=== Fife (4) ===
Constituency	Feb 1974	Oct 1974	1979
Dunfermline	Labour	Labour	Labour Co-op
Fife Central	Labour	Labour	Labour
Fife East	Conservative	Conservative	Conservative
Kirkcaldy	Labour	Labour	Labour

=== West Lothian (1) ===
Constituency	Feb 1974	Oct 1974	1979
West Lothian	Labour	Labour	Labour

=== Midlothian (8) ===
Constituency	Feb 1974	Oct 1974	1979
Edinburgh Central	Labour	Labour	Labour
Edinburgh East	Labour	Labour	Labour
Edinburgh Leith	Labour	Labour	Labour
Edinburgh North	Conservative	Conservative	Conservative
Edinburgh Pentlands	Conservative	Conservative	Conservative
Edinburgh South	Conservative	Conservative	Conservative
Edinburgh West	Conservative	Conservative	Conservative
Midlothian	Labour	Labour	Labour

=== Lanarkshire (21) ===
Constituency	Feb 1974	Oct 1974	1979
Bothwell	Labour	Labour	Labour
Coatbridge and Airdrie	Labour	Labour	Labour
East Kilbride	Labour	Labour	Labour
Glasgow Cathcart	Conservative	Conservative	Labour
Glasgow Central	Labour	Labour	Labour
Glasgow Craigton	Labour	Labour	Labour
Glasgow Garscadden	Labour	Labour	Labour
Glasgow Govan	Labour	Labour	Labour
Glasgow Hillhead	Conservative	Conservative	Conservative
Glasgow Kelvingrove	Labour	Labour	Labour
Glasgow Maryhill	Labour Co-op	Labour Co-op	Labour Co-op
Glasgow Pollok	Labour	Labour	Labour
Glasgow Provan	Labour	Labour	Labour
Glasgow Queen's Park	Labour	Labour	Labour
Glasgow Shettleston	Labour	Labour	Labour
Glasgow Springburn	Labour	Labour	Labour
Hamilton	Labour	Labour	Labour
Lanark	Labour	Labour	Labour
Lanarkshire North	Labour	Labour	Labour
Motherwell and Wishaw	Labour	Labour	Labour
Rutherglen	Labour	Labour	Labour

=== Dumfriesshire (1) ===
Constituency	Feb 1974	Oct 1974	1979
Dumfries	Conservative	Conservative	Conservative

=== Kircudbrightshire and Wigtownshire (1) ===
Constituency	Feb 1974	Oct 1974	1979
Galloway	Conservative	SNP	Conservative

=== Roxburghshire, Selkirkshire and Peeblesshire (1) ===
Constituency	Feb 1974	Oct 1974	1979
Roxburgh, Selkirk and Peebles	Liberal	Liberal	Liberal

=== Berwickshire and East Lothian (1) ===
Constituency	Feb 1974	Oct 1974	1979
Berwick and East Lothian	Conservative	Labour	Labour

== Northern Ireland (12) ==
=== Antrim (6) ===
Constituency	Feb 1974	Oct 1974	1979
Antrim North	Democratic Unionist	Democratic Unionist	Democratic Unionist
Antrim South	Ulster Unionist	Ulster Unionist	Ulster Unionist
Belfast West	SDLP	SDLP	SDLP
Belfast South	Vanguard	Vanguard	Ulster Unionist
Belfast North	Ulster Unionist	Ulster Unionist	Democratic Unionist
Belfast East	Vanguard	Vanguard	Democratic Unionist

=== Down (2) ===
Constituency	Feb 1974	Oct 1974	1979
Down North	Ulster Unionist	Ulster Unionist	Independent Unionist
Down South	Ulster Unionist	Ulster Unionist	Ulster Unionist

=== Antrim (1) ===
Constituency	Feb 1974	Oct 1974	1979
Armagh	Ulster Unionist	Ulster Unionist	Ulster Unionist

=== Fermanagh and Tyrone (2) ===
Constituency	Feb 1974	Oct 1974	1979
Fermanagh and South Tyrone	Ulster Unionist	Independent Republican	Independent Republican
Mid Ulster	Vanguard	Vanguard	United Ulster Unionist

=== Londonderry (1) ===
Constituency	Feb 1974	Oct 1974	1979
Londonderry	Ulster Unionist	Ulster Unionist	Ulster Unionist
