= List of United Kingdom Parliament constituencies (1983–1997) by region =

1801 to 1832
1832 to 1868
1868 to 1885
1885 to 1918
1918 to 1950
1950 to 1974
1974 to 1983
1983 to 1997
1997 to 2024
2024 to present

Constituencies 1974–1983 | 1983 MPs | 1987 MPs | 1992 MPs | Constituencies 1997–2024

This is a list of all constituencies that were in existence in the 1983 and 1987 General Elections broken down by region. Apart from one seat, the same seats were used in the 1992 General Election.

== South East of England (77 then 78) ==
=== Berkshire (7) ===
Constituency	1983	1987	1992
East Berkshire	Conservative	Conservative	Conservative
Newbury	Conservative	Conservative	Conservative
Reading East	Conservative	Conservative	Conservative
Reading West	Conservative	Conservative	Conservative
Slough	Conservative	Conservative	Conservative
Windsor and Maidenhead	Conservative	Conservative	Conservative
Wokingham	Conservative	Conservative	Conservative

=== Buckinghamshire (6 then 7) ===
Constituency	1983	1987	1992
Aylesbury	Conservative	Conservative	Conservative
Beaconsfield	Conservative	Conservative	Conservative
Buckingham	Conservative	Conservative	Conservative
Chesham and Amersham	Conservative	Conservative	Conservative
Milton Keynes / Milton Keynes North East (from 1992)	Conservative	Conservative	Conservative
Milton Keynes South West			Conservative
Wycombe	Conservative	Conservative	Conservative

=== East Sussex (8) ===
Constituency	1983	1987	1992
Bexhill and Battle	Conservative	Conservative	Conservative
Brighton Kemptown	Conservative	Conservative	Conservative
Brighton Pavilion	Conservative	Conservative	Conservative
Eastbourne	Conservative	Conservative	Conservative
Hastings and Rye	Conservative	Conservative	Conservative
Hove	Conservative	Conservative	Conservative
Lewes	Conservative	Conservative	Conservative
Wealden	Conservative	Conservative	Conservative

=== Hampshire (15) ===
Constituency	1983	1987	1992
Aldershot	Conservative	Conservative	Conservative
Basingstoke	Conservative	Conservative	Conservative
Eastleigh	Conservative	Conservative	Conservative
Fareham	Conservative	Conservative	Conservative
Gosport	Conservative	Conservative	Conservative
East Hampshire	Conservative	Conservative	Conservative
North West Hampshire	Conservative	Conservative	Conservative
Havant	Conservative	Conservative	Conservative
New Forest	Conservative	Conservative	Conservative
Portsmouth North	Conservative	Conservative	Conservative
Portsmouth South	Conservative	Conservative	Conservative
Romsey and Waterside	Conservative	Conservative	Conservative
Southampton Itchen	Conservative	Conservative	Labour
Southampton Test	Conservative	Conservative	Conservative
Winchester	Conservative	Conservative	Conservative

=== Isle of Wight (1) ===
Constituency	1983	1987	1992
Isle of Wight	Liberal	Conservative	Conservative

=== Kent (16) ===
Constituency	1983	1987	1992
Ashford	Conservative	Conservative	Conservative
Canterbury	Conservative	Conservative	Conservative
Dartford	Conservative	Conservative	Conservative
Dover	Conservative	Conservative	Conservative
Faversham	Conservative	Conservative	Conservative
Folkestone and Hythe	Conservative	Conservative	Conservative
Gillingham	Conservative	Conservative	Conservative
Gravesham	Conservative	Conservative	Conservative
Maidstone	Conservative	Conservative	Conservative
Medway	Conservative	Conservative	Conservative
Mid Kent	Conservative	Conservative	Conservative
Sevenoaks	Conservative	Conservative	Conservative
Thanet North	Conservative	Conservative	Conservative
Thanet South	Conservative	Conservative	Conservative
Tonbridge and Malling	Conservative	Conservative	Conservative
Tunbridge Wells	Conservative	Conservative	Conservative

=== Oxfordshire (6) ===
Constituency	1983	1987	1992
Banbury	Conservative	Conservative	Conservative
Henley	Conservative	Conservative	Conservative
Oxford East	Conservative	Labour	Labour
Oxford West and Abingdon	Conservative	Conservative	Conservative
Wantage	Conservative	Conservative	Conservative
Witney	Conservative	Conservative	Conservative

=== Surrey (11) ===
Constituency	1983	1987	1992
Chertsey and Walton	Conservative	Conservative	Conservative
Epsom and Ewell	Conservative	Conservative	Conservative
Esher	Conservative	Conservative	Conservative
Guildford	Conservative	Conservative	Conservative
Mole Valley	Conservative	Conservative	Conservative
Reigate	Conservative	Conservative	Conservative
Spelthorne	Conservative	Conservative	Conservative
East Surrey	Conservative	Conservative	Conservative
North West Surrey	Conservative	Conservative	Conservative
South West Surrey	Conservative	Conservative	Conservative
Woking	Conservative	Conservative	Conservative

=== West Sussex (7) ===
Constituency	1983	1987	1992
Arundel	Conservative	Conservative	Conservative
Chichester	Conservative	Conservative	Conservative
Crawley	Conservative	Conservative	Conservative
Horsham	Conservative	Conservative	Conservative
Shoreham	Conservative	Conservative	Conservative
Mid Sussex	Conservative	Conservative	Conservative
Worthing	Conservative	Conservative	Conservative

== South West of England (48) ==
=== Avon (10) ===
Constituency	1983	1987	1992
Bath	Conservative	Conservative	Liberal Democrat
Bristol East	Conservative	Conservative	Labour
Bristol North West	Conservative	Conservative	Conservative
Bristol South	Labour	Labour	Labour
Bristol West	Conservative	Conservative	Conservative
Kingswood	Conservative	Conservative	Labour
Northavon	Conservative	Conservative	Conservative
Wansdyke	Conservative	Conservative	Conservative
Weston-super-Mare	Conservative	Conservative	Conservative
Woodspring	Conservative	Conservative	Conservative

=== Cornwall (5) ===
Constituency	1983	1987	1992
Cornwall North	Conservative	Conservative	Liberal Democrat
Cornwall South East	Conservative	Conservative	Conservative
Falmouth and Camborne	Conservative	Conservative	Conservative
St Ives	Conservative	Conservative	Conservative
Truro	Liberal	Liberal	Liberal Democrat

=== Devon (11) ===
Constituency	1983	1987	1992
Devon North	Conservative	Conservative	Liberal Democrat
Devon West and Torridge	Conservative	Conservative	Conservative
Exeter	Conservative	Conservative	Conservative
Honiton	Conservative	Conservative	Conservative
Plymouth Devonport	Social Democrat	Social Democrat	Labour
Plymouth Drake	Conservative	Conservative	Conservative
Plymouth Sutton	Conservative	Conservative	Conservative
South Hams	Conservative	Conservative	Conservative
Teignbridge	Conservative	Conservative	Conservative
Tiverton	Conservative	Conservative	Conservative
Torbay	Conservative	Conservative	Conservative

=== Dorset (7) ===
Constituency	1983	1987	1992
Bournemouth East	Conservative	Conservative	Conservative
Bournemouth West	Conservative	Conservative	Conservative
Christchurch	Conservative	Conservative	Conservative
North Dorset	Conservative	Conservative	Conservative
Poole	Conservative	Conservative	Conservative
South Dorset	Conservative	Conservative	Conservative
West Dorset	Conservative	Conservative	Conservative

=== Gloucestershire (5) ===
Constituency	1983	1987	1992
Cheltenham	Conservative	Conservative	Liberal Democrat
Cirencester and Tewkesbury	Conservative	Conservative	Conservative
Gloucester	Conservative	Conservative	Conservative
Stroud	Conservative	Conservative	Conservative
West Gloucestershire	Conservative	Conservative	Conservative

=== Somerset (5) ===
Constituency	1983	1987	1992
Bridgwater	Conservative	Conservative	Conservative
Somerton and Frome	Conservative	Conservative	Conservative
Taunton	Conservative	Conservative	Conservative
Wells	Conservative	Conservative	Conservative
Yeovil	Liberal	Liberal	Liberal Democrat

=== Wiltshire (5) ===
Constituency	1983	1987	1992
Devizes	Conservative	Conservative	Conservative
North Wiltshire	Conservative	Conservative	Conservative
Salisbury	Conservative	Conservative	Conservative
Swindon	Conservative	Conservative	Conservative
Westbury	Conservative	Conservative	Conservative

== Greater London (84) ==
=== North West London (23) ===
The boroughs of Hillingdon, Harrow, Brent, Ealing, Barnet, Camden, Hammersmith & Fulham, Kensington & Chelsea and Westminster, and the City of London.

Constituency	1983	1987	1992
Brent East	Labour	Labour	Labour
Brent North	Conservative	Conservative	Conservative
Brent South	Labour Co-op	Labour	Labour
Chelsea	Conservative	Conservative	Conservative
Chipping Barnet	Conservative	Conservative	Conservative
City of London and Westminster South	Conservative	Conservative	Conservative
Ealing Acton	Conservative	Conservative	Conservative
Ealing North	Conservative	Conservative	Conservative
Ealing Southall	Labour	Labour	Labour
Finchley	Conservative	Conservative	Conservative
Fulham	Conservative	Conservative	Conservative
Hammersmith	Labour	Labour	Labour
Hampstead and Highgate	Conservative	Conservative	Labour
Harrow East	Conservative	Conservative	Conservative
Harrow West	Conservative	Conservative	Conservative
Hayes and Harlington	Conservative	Conservative	Conservative
Hendon North	Conservative	Conservative	Conservative
Hendon South	Conservative	Conservative	Conservative
Holborn and St Pancras	Labour	Labour	Labour
Kensington	Conservative	Conservative	Conservative
Ruislip and Northwood	Conservative	Conservative	Conservative
Uxbridge	Conservative	Conservative	Conservative
Westminster North	Conservative	Conservative	Conservative

=== North East London (25) ===
The boroughs of Enfield, Haringey, Islington, Hackney, Tower Hamlets, Newham, Waltham Forest, Redbridge, Barking & Dagenham and Havering.

Constituency	1983	1987	1992
Barking	Labour	Labour	Labour
Bethnal Green and Stepney	Labour	Labour	Labour
Bow and Poplar	Labour	Labour	Labour
Chingford	Conservative	Conservative	Conservative
Dagenham	Labour	Labour	Labour
Edmonton	Conservative	Conservative	Conservative
Enfield North	Conservative	Conservative	Conservative
Enfield Southgate	Conservative	Conservative	Conservative
Hackney North and Stoke Newington	Labour	Labour	Labour
Hackney South and Shoreditch	Labour	Labour	Labour
Hornchurch	Conservative	Conservative	Conservative
Hornsey and Wood Green	Conservative	Conservative	Labour
Ilford North	Conservative	Conservative	Conservative
Ilford South	Conservative	Conservative	Labour Co-op
Islington North	Labour	Labour	Labour
Islington South and Finsbury	Labour	Labour	Labour
Leyton	Labour	Labour	Labour
Newham North East	Labour	Labour	Labour
Newham North West	Labour	Labour	Labour
Newham South	Labour	Labour	Labour
Romford	Conservative	Conservative	Conservative
Tottenham	Labour	Labour	Labour
Upminster	Conservative	Conservative	Conservative
Walthamstow	Labour	Conservative	Labour
Wanstead and Woodford	Conservative	Conservative	Conservative

=== South West London (17) ===
The boroughs of Hounslow, Richmond, Kingston, Wandsworth, Merton, Sutton and Croydon.

Constituency	1983	1987	1992
Battersea	Labour	Conservative	Conservative
Brentford and Isleworth	Conservative	Conservative	Conservative
Carshalton and Wallington	Conservative	Conservative	Conservative
Croydon Central	Conservative	Conservative	Conservative
Croydon North East	Conservative	Conservative	Conservative
Croydon North West	Conservative	Conservative	Labour
Croydon South	Conservative	Conservative	Conservative
Feltham and Heston	Conservative	Conservative	Labour Co-op
Kingston upon Thames	Conservative	Conservative	Conservative
Mitcham and Morden	Conservative	Conservative	Conservative
Putney	Conservative	Conservative	Conservative
Richmond and Barnes	Conservative	Conservative	Conservative
Surbiton	Conservative	Conservative	Conservative
Sutton and Cheam	Conservative	Conservative	Conservative
Tooting	Labour	Labour	Labour
Twickenham	Conservative	Conservative	Conservative
Wimbledon	Conservative	Conservative	Conservative

=== South East London (19) ===
The boroughs of Lambeth, Southwark, Lewisham, Bromley, Greenwich and Bexley.

Constituency	1983	1987	1992
Beckenham	Conservative	Conservative	Conservative
Bexleyheath	Conservative	Conservative	Conservative
Chislehurst	Conservative	Conservative	Conservative
Dulwich	Conservative	Conservative	Labour
Eltham	Conservative	Conservative	Conservative
Erith and Crayford	Conservative	Conservative	Conservative
Greenwich	Labour	Social Democrat	Labour
Lewisham Deptford	Labour	Labour	Labour
Lewisham East	Conservative	Conservative	Labour
Lewisham West	Conservative	Conservative	Labour
Norwood	Labour	Labour	Labour
Old Bexley and Sidcup	Conservative	Conservative	Conservative
Orpington	Conservative	Conservative	Conservative
Peckham	Labour	Labour	Labour
Ravensbourne	Conservative	Conservative	Conservative
Southwark and Bermondsey	Liberal	Liberal	Liberal Democrat
Streatham	Conservative	Conservative	Labour
Vauxhall	Labour	Labour	Labour
Woolwich	Social Democrat	Social Democrat	Labour

== Eastern England (51) ==
=== Bedfordshire (5) ===
Constituency	1983	1987	1992
Luton North	Conservative	Conservative	Conservative
Luton South	Conservative	Conservative	Conservative
Mid Bedfordshire	Conservative	Conservative	Conservative
North Bedfordshire	Conservative	Conservative	Conservative
South West Bedfordshire	Conservative	Conservative	Conservative

=== Cambridgeshire (6) ===
Constituency	1983	1987	1992
Cambridge	Conservative	Conservative	Labour
Huntingdon	Conservative	Conservative	Conservative
North East Cambridgeshire	Liberal	Conservative	Conservative
Peterborough	Conservative	Conservative	Conservative
South East Cambridgeshire	Conservative	Conservative	Conservative
South West Cambridgeshire	Conservative	Conservative	Conservative

=== Essex (16) ===
Constituency	1983	1987	1992
Basildon	Conservative	Conservative	Conservative
Billericay	Conservative	Conservative	Conservative
Braintree	Conservative	Conservative	Conservative
Brentwood and Ongar	Conservative	Conservative	Conservative
Castle Point	Conservative	Conservative	Conservative
Chelmsford	Conservative	Conservative	Conservative
Epping Forest	Conservative	Conservative	Conservative
Harlow	Conservative	Conservative	Conservative
Harwich	Conservative	Conservative	Conservative
North Colchester	Conservative	Conservative	Conservative
Rochford	Conservative	Conservative	Conservative
Saffron Walden	Conservative	Conservative	Conservative
South Colchester and Maldon	Conservative	Conservative	Conservative
Southend East	Conservative	Conservative	Conservative
Southend West	Conservative	Conservative	Conservative
Thurrock	Labour	Conservative	Labour

=== Hertfordshire (10) ===
Constituency	1983	1987	1992
Broxbourne	Conservative	Conservative	Conservative
Hertford and Stortford	Conservative	Conservative	Conservative
Hertsmere	Conservative	Conservative	Conservative
North Hertfordshire	Conservative	Conservative	Conservative
St Albans	Conservative	Conservative	Conservative
South West Hertfordshire	Conservative	Conservative	Conservative
Stevenage	Conservative	Conservative	Conservative
Watford	Conservative	Conservative	Conservative
Welwyn Hatfield	Conservative	Conservative	Conservative
West Hertfordshire	Conservative	Conservative	Conservative

=== Norfolk (8) ===
Constituency	1983	1987	1992
Great Yarmouth	Conservative	Conservative	Conservative
Mid Norfolk	Conservative	Conservative	Conservative
North Norfolk	Conservative	Conservative	Conservative
North West Norfolk	Conservative	Conservative	Conservative
Norwich North	Conservative	Conservative	Conservative
Norwich South	Conservative	Labour	Labour
South Norfolk	Conservative	Conservative	Conservative
South West Norfolk	Conservative	Conservative	Conservative

=== Suffolk (6) ===
Constituency	1983	1987	1992
Bury St Edmunds	Conservative	Conservative	Conservative
Central Suffolk	Conservative	Conservative	Conservative
Ipswich	Labour	Conservative	Labour
South Suffolk	Conservative	Conservative	Conservative
Suffolk Coastal	Conservative	Conservative	Conservative
Waveney	Conservative	Conservative	Conservative

== West Midlands (58) ==
=== Hereford and Worcester (7) ===
Constituency	1983	1987	1992
Bromsgrove	Conservative	Conservative	Conservative
Hereford	Conservative	Conservative	Conservative
Leominster	Conservative	Conservative	Conservative
Mid Worcestershire	Conservative	Conservative	Conservative
South Worcestershire	Conservative	Conservative	Conservative
Worcester	Conservative	Conservative	Conservative
Wyre Forest	Conservative	Conservative	Conservative

=== Shropshire (4) ===
Constituency	1983	1987	1992
Ludlow	Conservative	Conservative	Conservative
North Shropshire	Conservative	Conservative	Conservative
Shrewsbury and Atcham	Conservative	Conservative	Conservative
The Wrekin	Conservative	Labour	Labour

=== Staffordshire (11) ===
Constituency	1983	1987	1992
Burton	Conservative	Conservative	Conservative
Cannock and Burntwood	Conservative	Conservative	Labour
Mid Staffordshire	Conservative	Conservative	Conservative
Newcastle-under-Lyme	Labour	Labour	Labour
South Staffordshire	Conservative	Conservative	Conservative
South East Staffordshire	Conservative	Conservative	Conservative
Stafford	Conservative	Conservative	Conservative
Staffordshire Moorlands	Conservative	Conservative	Conservative
Stoke on Trent Central	Labour	Labour	Labour
Stoke on Trent North	Labour	Labour	Labour
Stoke on Trent South	Labour	Labour	Labour

=== Warwickshire (5) ===
Constituency	1983	1987	1992
North Warwickshire	Conservative	Conservative	Labour
Nuneaton	Conservative	Conservative	Labour
Rugby and Kenilworth	Conservative	Conservative	Conservative
Stratford upon Avon	Conservative	Conservative	Conservative
Warwick and Leamington	Conservative	Conservative	Conservative

=== West Midlands (31) ===
Constituency	1983	1987	1992
Aldridge-Brownhills	Conservative	Conservative	Conservative
Birmingham Edgbaston	Conservative	Conservative	Conservative
Birmingham Erdington	Labour	Labour	Labour
Birmingham Hall Green	Conservative	Conservative	Conservative
Birmingham Hodge Hill	Labour	Labour	Labour
Birmingham Ladywood	Labour	Labour	Labour
Birmingham Northfield	Conservative	Conservative	Labour
Birmingham Perry Barr	Labour	Labour	Labour
Birmingham Selly Oak	Conservative	Conservative	Labour
Birmingham Small Heath	Labour	Labour	Labour
Birmingham Sparkbrook	Labour	Labour	Labour
Birmingham Yardley	Conservative	Conservative	Labour
Coventry North East	Labour	Labour	Labour
Coventry North West	Labour	Labour	Labour
Coventry South East	Labour	Labour	Labour
Coventry South West	Conservative	Conservative	Conservative
Dudley East	Labour	Labour	Labour
Dudley West	Conservative	Conservative	Conservative
Halesowen and Stourbridge	Conservative	Conservative	Conservative
Meriden	Conservative	Conservative	Conservative
Solihull	Conservative	Conservative	Conservative
Sutton Coldfield	Conservative	Conservative	Conservative
Walsall North	Labour	Labour	Labour
Walsall South	Labour	Labour	Labour
Warley East	Labour	Labour	Labour
Warley West	Labour	Labour	Labour
West Bromwich East	Labour	Labour	Labour
West Bromwich West	Labour	Labour	Labour
Wolverhampton North East	Labour	Conservative	Labour Co-op
Wolverhampton South East	Labour Co-op	Labour Co-op	Labour Co-op
Wolverhampton South West	Conservative	Conservative	Conservative

== East Midlands (42) ==
=== Derbyshire (10) ===
Constituency	1983	1987	1992
Amber Valley	Conservative	Conservative	Conservative
Bolsover	Labour	Labour	Labour
Chesterfield	Labour	Labour	Labour
Derby North	Conservative	Conservative	Conservative
Derby South	Labour	Labour	Labour
Erewash	Conservative	Conservative	Conservative
High Peak	Conservative	Conservative	Conservative
North East Derbyshire	Labour	Labour	Labour
South Derbyshire	Conservative	Conservative	Conservative
West Derbyshire	Conservative	Conservative	Conservative

=== Leicestershire (9) ===
Constituency	1983	1987	1992
Blaby	Conservative	Conservative	Conservative
Bosworth	Conservative	Conservative	Conservative
Harborough	Conservative	Conservative	Conservative
Leicester East	Conservative	Labour	Labour
Leicester South	Conservative	Labour	Labour
Leicester West	Labour	Labour	Labour
Loughborough	Conservative	Conservative	Conservative
North West Leicestershire	Conservative	Conservative	Conservative
Rutland and Melton	Conservative	Conservative	Conservative

=== Lincolnshire (6) ===
Constituency	1983	1987	1992
East Lindsey	Conservative	Conservative	Conservative
Gainsborough and Horncastle	Conservative	Conservative	Conservative
Grantham	Conservative	Conservative	Conservative
Holland with Boston	Conservative	Conservative	Conservative
Lincoln	Conservative	Conservative	Conservative
Stamford and Spalding	Conservative	Conservative	Conservative

=== Northamptonshire (6) ===
Constituency	1983	1987	1992
Corby	Conservative	Conservative	Conservative
Daventry	Conservative	Conservative	Conservative
Kettering	Conservative	Conservative	Conservative
Northampton North	Conservative	Conservative	Conservative
Northampton South	Conservative	Conservative	Conservative
Wellingborough	Conservative	Conservative	Conservative

=== Nottinghamshire (11) ===
Constituency	1983	1987	1992
Ashfield	Labour	Labour	Labour
Bassetlaw	Labour	Labour	Labour
Broxtowe	Conservative	Conservative	Conservative
Gedling	Conservative	Conservative	Conservative
Mansfield	Labour	Labour	Labour
Newark	Conservative	Conservative	Conservative
Nottingham East	Conservative	Conservative	Labour
Nottingham North	Conservative	Labour	Labour
Nottingham South	Conservative	Conservative	Labour
Rushcliffe	Conservative	Conservative	Conservative
Sherwood	Conservative	Conservative	Labour

== North East of England (30) ==
=== Cleveland (6) ===
Constituency	1983	1987	1992
Hartlepool	Labour	Labour	Labour
Langbaurgh	Conservative	Conservative	Conservative
Middlesbrough	Labour	Labour	Labour
Redcar	Labour	Labour	Labour
Stockton North	Labour	Labour	Labour
Stockton South	Social Democrat	Conservative	Conservative

=== Durham (7) ===
Constituency	1983	1987	1992
Bishop Auckland	Labour	Labour	Labour
City of Durham	Labour	Labour	Labour
Darlington	Conservative	Conservative	Labour
Easington	Labour	Labour	Labour
North Durham	Labour	Labour	Labour
North West Durham	Labour	Labour	Labour
Sedgefield	Labour	Labour	Labour

=== Northumberland (4) ===
Constituency	1983	1987	1992
Berwick upon Tweed	Liberal	Liberal	Liberal Democrat
Blyth Valley	Labour	Labour	Labour
Hexham	Conservative	Conservative	Conservative
Wansbeck	Labour	Labour	Labour

=== Tyne and Wear (13) ===
Constituency	1983	1987	1992
Blaydon	Labour	Labour	Labour
Gateshead East	Labour	Labour	Labour
Houghton and Washington	Labour	Labour	Labour
Jarrow	Labour	Labour	Labour
Newcastle upon Tyne Central	Conservative	Labour	Labour
Newcastle upon Tyne East	Labour	Labour	Labour
Newcastle upon Tyne North	Labour	Labour	Labour
South Shields	Labour	Labour	Labour
Sunderland North	Labour	Labour	Labour
Sunderland South	Labour	Labour	Labour
Tyne Bridge	Labour	Labour	Labour
Tynemouth	Conservative	Conservative	Conservative
Wallsend	Labour	Labour	Labour

== North West of England (79) ==
=== Cheshire (10) ===
Constituency	1983	1987	1992
City of Chester	Conservative	Conservative	Conservative
Congleton	Conservative	Conservative	Conservative
Crewe and Nantwich	Labour	Labour	Labour
Eddisbury	Conservative	Conservative	Conservative
Ellesmere Port and Neston	Conservative	Conservative	Labour
Halton	Labour	Labour	Labour
Macclesfield	Conservative	Conservative	Conservative
Tatton	Conservative	Conservative	Conservative
Warrington North	Labour	Labour	Labour
Warrington South	Conservative	Conservative	Labour

=== Cumbria (6) ===
Constituency	1983	1987	1992
Barrow and Furness	Conservative	Conservative	Labour
Carlisle	Labour	Labour	Labour
Copeland	Labour	Labour	Labour
Penrith and the Border	Conservative	Conservative	Conservative
Westmorland and Lonsdale	Conservative	Conservative	Conservative
Workington	Labour	Labour	Labour

=== Greater Manchester (30) ===
Constituency	1983	1987	1992
Altrincham and Sale	Conservative	Conservative	Conservative
Ashton under Lyne	Labour	Labour	Labour
Bolton North East	Conservative	Conservative	Conservative
Bolton South East	Labour	Labour	Labour
Bolton West	Conservative	Conservative	Conservative
Bury North	Conservative	Conservative	Conservative
Bury South	Conservative	Conservative	Conservative
Cheadle	Conservative	Conservative	Conservative
Davyhulme	Conservative	Conservative	Conservative
Denton and Reddish	Labour	Labour	Labour
Eccles	Labour	Labour	Labour
Hazel Grove	Conservative	Conservative	Conservative
Heywood and Middleton	Labour	Labour	Labour
Leigh	Labour	Labour	Labour
Littleborough and Saddleworth	Conservative	Conservative	Conservative
Makerfield	Labour	Labour	Labour
Manchester Blackley	Labour	Labour	Labour
Manchester Central	Labour	Labour	Labour
Manchester Gorton	Labour	Labour	Labour
Manchester Withington	Conservative	Labour	Labour
Manchester Wythenshawe	Labour Co-op	Labour Co-op	Labour
Oldham Central and Royton	Labour	Labour	Labour
Oldham West	Labour	Labour	Labour
Rochdale	Liberal	Liberal	Liberal Democrat
Salford East	Labour	Labour	Labour
Stalybridge and Hyde	Labour	Labour	Labour
Stockport	Conservative	Conservative	Labour
Stretford	Labour	Labour	Labour
Wigan	Labour	Labour	Labour
Worsley	Labour	Labour	Labour

=== Lancashire (16) ===
Constituency	1983	1987	1992
Blackburn	Labour	Labour	Labour
Blackpool North	Conservative	Conservative	Conservative
Blackpool South	Conservative	Conservative	Conservative
Burnley	Labour	Labour	Labour
Chorley	Conservative	Conservative	Conservative
Fylde	Conservative	Conservative	Conservative
Hyndburn	Conservative	Conservative	Labour
Lancaster	Conservative	Conservative	Conservative
Morecambe and Lunesdale	Conservative	Conservative	Conservative
Pendle	Conservative	Conservative	Labour
Preston	Labour	Labour	Labour
Ribble Valley	Conservative	Conservative	Conservative
Rossendale and Darwen	Conservative	Conservative	Labour
South Ribble	Conservative	Conservative	Conservative
West Lancashire	Conservative	Conservative	Labour
Wyre	Conservative	Conservative	Conservative

=== Merseyside (17) ===
Constituency	1983	1987	1992
Birkenhead	Labour	Labour	Labour
Bootle	Labour	Labour	Labour
Crosby	Conservative	Conservative	Conservative
Knowsley North	Labour	Labour	Labour
Knowsley South	Labour	Labour	Labour
Liverpool Broadgreen	Labour	Labour	Labour
Liverpool Garston	Labour	Labour	Labour
Liverpool Mossley Hill	Liberal	Liberal	Liberal Democrat
Liverpool Riverside	Labour	Labour	Labour
Liverpool Walton	Labour	Labour	Labour
Liverpool West Derby	Labour	Labour	Labour
Southport	Conservative	Liberal	Conservative
St Helens North	Labour	Labour	Labour
St Helens South	Labour	Labour	Labour
Wallasey	Conservative	Conservative	Labour
Wirral South	Conservative	Conservative	Conservative
Wirral West	Conservative	Conservative	Conservative

== Yorkshire and Humberside (54) ==
=== Humberside (9) ===
Constituency	1983	1987	1992
Beverley	Conservative	Conservative	Conservative
Boothferry	Conservative	Conservative	Conservative
Bridlington	Conservative	Conservative	Conservative
Brigg and Cleethorpes	Conservative	Conservative	Conservative
Glanford and Scunthorpe	Conservative	Labour	Labour
Great Grimsby	Labour	Labour	Labour
Kingston upon Hull East	Labour	Labour	Labour
Kingston upon Hull North	Labour	Labour	Labour
Kingston upon Hull West	Labour	Labour	Labour

=== North Yorkshire (7) ===
Constituency	1983	1987	1992
Harrogate	Conservative	Conservative	Conservative
Richmond (Yorks)	Conservative	Conservative	Conservative
Ryedale	Conservative	Conservative	Conservative
Scarborough	Conservative	Conservative	Conservative
Selby	Conservative	Conservative	Conservative
Skipton and Ripon	Conservative	Conservative	Conservative
York	Conservative	Conservative	Labour

=== South Yorkshire (15) ===
Constituency	1983	1987	1992
Barnsley Central	Labour	Labour	Labour
Barnsley East	Labour	Labour	Labour
Barnsley West and Penistone	Labour	Labour	Labour
Don Valley	Labour	Labour	Labour
Doncaster Central	Labour	Labour	Labour
Doncaster North	Labour	Labour	Labour
Rother Valley	Labour	Labour	Labour
Rotherham	Labour	Labour	Labour
Sheffield Attercliffe	Labour	Labour	Labour
Sheffield Brightside	Labour	Labour	Labour
Sheffield Central	Labour	Labour	Labour
Sheffield Hallam	Conservative	Conservative	Conservative
Sheffield Heeley	Labour	Labour	Labour
Sheffield Hillsborough	Labour	Labour	Labour
Wentworth	Labour	Labour	Labour

=== West Yorkshire (23) ===
Constituency	1983	1987	1992
Batley and Spen	Conservative	Conservative	Conservative
Bradford North	Conservative	Labour	Labour
Bradford South	Labour	Labour	Labour
Bradford West	Labour	Labour	Labour
Calder Valley	Conservative	Conservative	Conservative
Colne Valley	Liberal	Conservative	Conservative
Dewsbury	Conservative	Labour	Labour
Elmet	Conservative	Conservative	Conservative
Halifax	Conservative	Labour	Labour
Hemsworth	Labour	Labour	Labour
Huddersfield	Labour Co-op	Labour Co-op	Labour
Keighley	Conservative	Conservative	Conservative
Leeds Central	Labour	Labour	Labour
Leeds East	Labour	Labour	Labour
Leeds North East	Conservative	Conservative	Conservative
Leeds North West	Conservative	Conservative	Conservative
Leeds West	Liberal	Labour	Labour
Morley and Leeds South	Labour	Labour	Labour
Normanton	Labour	Labour	Labour
Pontefract and Castleford	Labour	Labour	Labour
Pudsey	Conservative	Conservative	Conservative
Shipley	Conservative	Conservative	Conservative
Wakefield	Labour	Labour	Labour

== Scotland (72) ==
=== Borders (2) ===
Constituency	1983	1987	1992
Roxburgh and Berwickshire	Liberal	Liberal	Liberal Democrat
Tweeddale, Ettrick and Lauderdale	Liberal	Liberal	Liberal Democrat

=== Dumfries and Galloway (2) ===
Constituency	1983	1987	1992
Dumfriesshire	Conservative	Conservative	Conservative
Galloway and Upper Nithsdale	Conservative	Conservative	Conservative

=== Strathclyde (33) ===
Constituency	1983	1987	1992
Argyll and Bute	Conservative	Liberal	Liberal Democrat
Ayr	Conservative	Conservative	Conservative
Carrick, Cumnock and Doon Valley	Labour	Labour	Labour
Clydebank and Milngavie	Labour	Labour	Labour
Clydesdale	Labour	Labour	Labour
Cumbernauld and Kilsyth	Labour	Labour	Labour
Cunninghame North	Conservative	Labour	Labour
Cunninghame South	Labour	Labour	Labour
Dumbarton	Labour	Labour	Labour
East Kilbride	Labour	Labour	Labour
Eastwood	Conservative	Conservative	Conservative
Glasgow Cathcart	Labour	Labour	Labour
Glasgow Central	Labour	Labour	Labour
Glasgow Garscadden	Labour	Labour	Labour
Glasgow Govan	Labour	Labour	Labour
Glasgow Hillhead	Social Democrat	Labour	Labour
Glasgow Maryhill	Labour	Labour	Labour
Glasgow Pollok	Labour	Labour	Labour
Glasgow Provan	Labour	Labour	Labour
Glasgow Rutherglen	Labour	Labour	Labour
Glasgow Shettleston	Labour	Labour	Labour
Glasgow Springburn	Labour	Labour	Labour
Greenock and Port Glasgow	Labour	Labour	Labour
Hamilton	Labour	Labour	Labour
Kilmarnock and Loudoun	Labour	Labour	Labour
Monklands East	Labour	Labour	Labour
Monklands West	Labour	Labour	Labour
Motherwell North	Labour	Labour	Labour
Motherwell South	Labour	Labour	Labour
Paisley North	Labour	Labour	Labour
Paisley South	Labour	Labour	Labour
Renfrew West and Inverclyde	Conservative	Labour	Labour
Strathkelvin and Bearsden	Conservative	Labour	Labour

=== Lothian (10) ===
Constituency	1983	1987	1992
East Lothian	Labour	Labour	Labour
Edinburgh Central	Conservative	Labour	Labour
Edinburgh East	Labour	Labour	Labour
Edinburgh Leith	Labour	Labour	Labour
Edinburgh Pentlands	Conservative	Conservative	Conservative
Edinburgh South	Conservative	Labour	Labour
Edinburgh West	Conservative	Conservative	Conservative
Linlithgow	Labour	Labour	Labour
Livingston	Labour	Labour	Labour
Midlothian	Labour	Labour	Labour

=== Central (4) ===
Constituency	1983	1987	1992
Clackmannan	Labour	Labour	Labour
Falkirk East	Labour	Labour	Labour
Falkirk West	Labour	Labour	Labour
Stirling	Conservative	Conservative	Conservative

=== Fife (5) ===
Constituency	1983	1987	1992
Central Fife	Labour	Labour	Labour
Dunfermline East	Labour	Labour	Labour
Dunfermline West	Labour	Labour	Labour
Kirkcaldy	Labour	Labour	Labour
North East Fife	Conservative	Liberal	Liberal Democrat

=== Tayside (5) ===
Constituency	1983	1987	1992
Angus East	Conservative	SNP	SNP
Dundee East	SNP	Labour	Labour
Dundee West	Labour	Labour	Labour
North Tayside	Conservative	Conservative	Conservative
Perth and Kinross	Conservative	Conservative	Conservative

=== Grampian (6) ===
Constituency	1983	1987	1992
Aberdeen North	Labour	Labour	Labour
Aberdeen South	Conservative	Labour	Conservative
Banff and Buchan	Conservative	SNP	SNP
Gordon	Liberal	Liberal	Liberal Democrat
Kincardine and Deeside	Conservative	Conservative	Conservative
Moray	Conservative	SNP	SNP

=== Highland (5) ===
Constituency	1983	1987	1992
Caithness and Sutherland	Social Democrat	Social Democrat	Liberal Democrat
Inverness, Nairn and Lochaber	Liberal	Liberal	Liberal Democrat
Orkney and Shetland	Liberal	Liberal	Liberal Democrat
Ross, Cromarty and Skye	Social Democrat	Social Democrat	Liberal Democrat
Western Isles	SNP	Labour	Labour

== Wales (38) ==
=== Gwynedd (4) ===
Constituency	1983	1987	1992
Caernarfon	Plaid Cymru	Plaid Cymru	Plaid Cymru
Conwy	Conservative	Conservative	Conservative
Meirionnydd Nant Conwy	Plaid Cymru	Plaid Cymru	Plaid Cymru
Ynys Môn	Conservative	Plaid Cymru	Plaid Cymru

=== Clwyd (5) ===
Constituency	1983	1987	1992
Alyn and Deeside	Labour	Labour	Labour
Clwyd North West	Conservative	Conservative	Conservative
Clwyd South West	Conservative	Labour	Labour
Delyn	Conservative	Conservative	Labour
Wrexham	Labour	Labour	Labour

=== Dyfed (4) ===
Constituency	1983	1987	1992
Carmarthen	Labour	Labour	Labour
Ceredigion and Pembroke North	Liberal	Liberal	Plaid Cymru
Llanelli	Labour	Labour	Labour
Pembroke	Conservative	Conservative	Labour

=== Powys (2) ===
Constituency	1983	1987	1992
Brecon and Radnorshire	Conservative	Liberal	Conservative
Montgomeryshire	Liberal	Liberal	Liberal Democrat

=== West Glamorgan (5) ===
Constituency	1983	1987	1992
Aberavon	Labour	Labour	Labour
Gower	Labour	Labour	Labour
Neath	Labour	Labour	Labour
Swansea East	Labour	Labour	Labour
Swansea West	Labour	Labour	Labour

=== Mid Glamorgan (6) ===
Constituency	1983	1987	1992
Bridgend	Conservative	Labour	Labour
Cynon Valley	Labour	Labour	Labour
Merthyr Tydfil and Rhymney	Labour	Labour	Labour
Ogmore	Labour	Labour	Labour
Pontypridd	Labour	Labour	Labour
Rhondda	Labour	Labour	Labour

=== South Glamorgan (5) ===
Constituency	1983	1987	1992
Cardiff Central	Conservative	Conservative	Labour
Cardiff North	Conservative	Conservative	Conservative
Cardiff South and Penarth	Labour	Labour	Labour
Cardiff West	Conservative	Labour	Labour
Vale of Glamorgan	Conservative	Conservative	Conservative

=== Gwent (7) ===
Constituency	1983	1987	1992
Blaenau Gwent	Labour	Labour	Labour
Caerphilly	Labour	Labour	Labour
Islwyn	Labour	Labour	Labour
Monmouth	Conservative	Conservative	Conservative
Newport East	Labour	Labour	Labour
Newport West	Conservative	Labour	Labour
Torfaen	Labour	Labour	Labour

== Northern Ireland (17) ==
Constituency	1983	1987	1992
Antrim East	Ulster Unionist	Ulster Unionist	Ulster Unionist
Antrim North	Democratic Unionist	Democratic Unionist	Democratic Unionist
Antrim South	Ulster Unionist	Ulster Unionist	Ulster Unionist
Belfast West	Sinn Féin	Sinn Féin	SDLP
Belfast South	Ulster Unionist	Ulster Unionist	Ulster Unionist
Belfast North	Ulster Unionist	Ulster Unionist	Ulster Unionist
Belfast East	Democratic Unionist	Democratic Unionist	Democratic Unionist
Down North	Ulster Popular Unionist	Ulster Popular Unionist	Ulster Popular Unionist
Down South	Ulster Unionist	SDLP	SDLP
Fermanagh and South Tyrone	Ulster Unionist	Ulster Unionist	Ulster Unionist
Foyle	SDLP	SDLP	SDLP
Lagan Valley	Ulster Unionist	Ulster Unionist	Ulster Unionist
Londonderry East	Ulster Unionist	Ulster Unionist	Ulster Unionist
Newry and Armagh	Ulster Unionist	SDLP	SDLP
Strangford	Ulster Unionist	Ulster Unionist	Ulster Unionist
Mid Ulster	Democratic Unionist	Democratic Unionist	Democratic Unionist
Upper Bann	Ulster Unionist	Ulster Unionist	Ulster Unionist
