= List of United Kingdom Parliament constituencies (1997–2024) by region =

Constituencies in the UK for elections to the House of Commons between 1997 and 2024

1801 to 1832
1832 to 1868
1868 to 1885
1885 to 1918
1918 to 1950
1950 to 1974
1974 to 1983
1983 to 1997
1997 to 2024
2024–present

These constituencies were used for elections to the House of Commons of the United Kingdom from 1997 to 2024.

== England ==
=== East Midlands (44 then 46) ===
==== Derbyshire (10 then 11) ====
Constituency	1997	2001	2005	2010	2015	2017	2019
Amber Valley	Labour	Labour	Labour	Conservative	Conservative	Conservative	Conservative
Bolsover	Labour	Labour	Labour	Labour	Labour	Labour	Conservative
Chesterfield	Labour	Liberal Democrat	Liberal Democrat	Labour	Labour	Labour	Labour
Derby North	Labour	Labour	Labour	Labour	Conservative	Labour	Conservative
Derby South	Labour	Labour	Labour	Labour	Labour	Labour	Labour
Erewash	Labour	Labour	Labour	Conservative	Conservative	Conservative	Conservative
High Peak	Labour	Labour	Labour	Conservative	Conservative	Labour	Conservative
Mid Derbyshire	N/A			Conservative	Conservative	Conservative	Conservative
North East Derbyshire	Labour	Labour	Labour	Labour	Labour	Conservative	Conservative
South Derbyshire	Labour	Labour	Labour	Conservative	Conservative	Conservative	Conservative
West Derbyshire / Derbyshire Dales (from 2010)	Conservative	Conservative	Conservative	Conservative	Conservative	Conservative	Conservative

==== Leicestershire (10) ====
Constituency	1997	2001	2005	2010	2015	2017	2019
Blaby / South Leicestershire (from 2010)	Conservative	Conservative	Conservative	Conservative	Conservative	Conservative	Conservative
Bosworth	Conservative	Conservative	Conservative	Conservative	Conservative	Conservative	Conservative
Charnwood	Conservative	Conservative	Conservative	Conservative	Conservative	Conservative	Conservative
Harborough	Conservative	Conservative	Conservative	Conservative	Conservative	Conservative	Conservative
Leicester East	Labour	Labour	Labour	Labour	Labour	Labour	Labour
Leicester South	Labour	Labour	Labour	Labour	Labour	Labour	Labour
Leicester West	Labour	Labour	Labour	Labour	Labour	Labour	Labour
Loughborough	Labour	Labour	Labour	Conservative	Conservative	Conservative	Conservative
North West Leicestershire	Labour	Labour	Labour	Conservative	Conservative	Conservative	Conservative
Rutland and Melton	Conservative	Conservative	Conservative	Conservative	Conservative	Conservative	Conservative

==== Lincolnshire (7) ====
Constituency	1997	2001	2005	2010	2015	2017	2019
Boston and Skegness	Conservative	Conservative	Conservative	Conservative	Conservative	Conservative	Conservative
Gainsborough	Conservative	Conservative	Conservative	Conservative	Conservative	Conservative	Conservative
Grantham and Stamford	Conservative	Conservative	Conservative	Conservative	Conservative	Conservative	Conservative
Lincoln	Labour	Labour	Labour	Conservative	Conservative	Labour	Conservative
Louth and Horncastle	Conservative	Conservative	Conservative	Conservative	Conservative	Conservative	Conservative
Sleaford and North Hykeham	Conservative	Conservative	Conservative	Conservative	Conservative	Conservative	Conservative
South Holland and The Deepings	Conservative	Conservative	Conservative	Conservative	Conservative	Conservative	Conservative

==== Northamptonshire (6 then 7) ====
Constituency	1997	2001	2005	2010	2015	2017	2019
Corby	Labour	Labour	Labour	Conservative^{1}	Conservative	Conservative	Conservative
Daventry	Conservative	Conservative	Conservative	Conservative	Conservative	Conservative	Conservative
Kettering	Labour	Labour	Conservative	Conservative	Conservative	Conservative	Conservative
Northampton North	Labour	Labour	Labour	Conservative	Conservative	Conservative	Conservative
Northampton South	Labour	Labour	Conservative	Conservative	Conservative	Conservative	Conservative
South Northamptonshire	N/A			Conservative	Conservative	Conservative	Conservative
Wellingborough	Labour	Labour	Conservative	Conservative	Conservative	Conservative	Conservative

^{1}seat won by Labour in a 2012 by-election

==== Nottinghamshire (11) ====
Constituency	1997	2001	2005	2010	2015	2017	2019
Ashfield	Labour	Labour	Labour	Labour	Labour	Labour	Conservative
Bassetlaw	Labour	Labour	Labour	Labour	Labour	Labour	Conservative
Broxtowe	Labour	Labour	Labour	Conservative	Conservative	Conservative	Conservative
Gedling	Labour	Labour	Labour	Labour	Labour	Labour	Conservative
Mansfield	Labour	Labour	Labour	Labour	Labour	Conservative	Conservative
Newark	Labour	Conservative	Conservative	Conservative	Conservative	Conservative	Conservative
Nottingham East	Labour	Labour	Labour	Labour	Labour	Labour	Labour
Nottingham North	Labour	Labour	Labour	Labour	Labour	Labour	Labour
Nottingham South	Labour	Labour	Labour	Labour	Labour	Labour	Labour
Rushcliffe	Conservative	Conservative	Conservative	Conservative	Conservative	Conservative	Conservative
Sherwood	Labour	Labour	Labour	Conservative	Conservative	Conservative	Conservative

=== East of England (56 then 58) ===
==== Bedfordshire (6) ====
Constituency	1997	2001	2005	2010	2015	2017	2019
Bedford	Labour	Labour	Labour	Conservative	Conservative	Labour	Labour
Luton North	Labour	Labour	Labour	Labour	Labour	Labour	Labour
Luton South	Labour	Labour	Labour	Labour	Labour	Labour	Labour
Mid Bedfordshire	Conservative	Conservative	Conservative	Conservative	Conservative	Conservative	Conservative
North East Bedfordshire	Conservative	Conservative	Conservative	Conservative	Conservative	Conservative	Conservative
South West Bedfordshire	Conservative	Conservative	Conservative	Conservative	Conservative	Conservative	Conservative

==== Cambridgeshire (7) ====
Constituency	1997	2001	2005	2010	2015	2017	2019
Cambridge	Labour	Labour	Liberal Democrat	Liberal Democrat	Labour	Labour	Labour
Huntingdon	Conservative	Conservative	Conservative	Conservative	Conservative	Conservative	Conservative
North East Cambridgeshire	Conservative	Conservative	Conservative	Conservative	Conservative	Conservative	Conservative
North West Cambridgeshire	Conservative	Conservative	Conservative	Conservative	Conservative	Conservative	Conservative
Peterborough	Labour	Labour	Conservative	Conservative	Conservative	Labour	Conservative
South Cambridgeshire	Conservative	Conservative	Conservative	Conservative	Conservative	Conservative	Conservative
South East Cambridgeshire	Conservative	Conservative	Conservative	Conservative	Conservative	Conservative	Conservative

==== Essex (17 then 18) ====
Constituency	1997	2001	2005	2010	2015	2017	2019
Basildon / South Basildon and East Thurrock (2010)	Labour	Labour	Labour	Conservative	Conservative	Conservative	Conservative
Billericay / Basildon and Billericay (2010)	Conservative	Conservative	Conservative	Conservative	Conservative	Conservative	Conservative
Braintree	Labour	Labour	Conservative	Conservative	Conservative	Conservative	Conservative
Brentwood and Ongar	Conservative	Conservative	Conservative	Conservative	Conservative	Conservative	Conservative
Castle Point	Labour	Conservative	Conservative	Conservative	Conservative	Conservative	Conservative
Colchester	Liberal Democrat	Liberal Democrat	Liberal Democrat	Liberal Democrat	Conservative	Conservative	Conservative
Epping Forest	Conservative	Conservative	Conservative	Conservative	Conservative	Conservative	Conservative
Harlow	Labour	Labour	Labour	Conservative	Conservative	Conservative	Conservative
Harwich / Clacton (2010)	Labour	Labour	Conservative	Conservative^{1}	UKIP	Conservative	Conservative
Maldon and East Chelmsford / Maldon (2010)	Conservative	Conservative	Conservative	Conservative	Conservative	Conservative	Conservative
North Essex / Harwich and North Essex (2010)	Conservative	Conservative	Conservative	Conservative	Conservative	Conservative	Conservative
Rayleigh / Rayleigh and Wickford (2010)	Conservative	Conservative	Conservative	Conservative	Conservative	Conservative	Conservative
Rochford and Southend East	Conservative	Conservative	Conservative	Conservative	Conservative	Conservative	Conservative
Saffron Walden	Conservative	Conservative	Conservative	Conservative	Conservative	Conservative	Conservative
Southend West	Conservative	Conservative	Conservative	Conservative	Conservative	Conservative	Conservative
Thurrock	Labour	Labour	Labour	Conservative	Conservative	Conservative	Conservative
West Chelmsford / Chelmsford (2010)	Conservative	Conservative	Conservative	Conservative	Conservative	Conservative	Conservative
Witham				Conservative	Conservative	Conservative	Conservative

==== Hertfordshire (11) ====
Constituency	1997	2001	2005	2010	2015	2017	2019
Broxbourne	Conservative	Conservative	Conservative	Conservative	Conservative	Conservative	Conservative
Hemel Hempstead	Labour	Labour	Conservative	Conservative	Conservative	Conservative	Conservative
Hertford and Stortford	Conservative	Conservative	Conservative	Conservative	Conservative	Conservative	Conservative
Hertsmere	Conservative	Conservative	Conservative	Conservative	Conservative	Conservative	Conservative
Hitchin and Harpenden	Conservative	Conservative	Conservative	Conservative	Conservative	Conservative	Conservative
North East Hertfordshire	Conservative	Conservative	Conservative	Conservative	Conservative	Conservative	Conservative
St Albans	Labour	Labour	Conservative	Conservative	Conservative	Conservative	Liberal Democrat
South West Hertfordshire	Conservative	Conservative	Conservative	Conservative	Conservative	Conservative	Conservative
Stevenage	Labour	Labour	Labour	Conservative	Conservative	Conservative	Conservative
Watford	Labour	Labour	Labour	Conservative	Conservative	Conservative	Conservative
Welwyn Hatfield	Labour	Labour	Conservative	Conservative	Conservative	Conservative	Conservative

==== Norfolk (8 then 9) ====
Constituency	1997	2001	2005	2010	2015	2017	2019
Broadland				Conservative	Conservative	Conservative	Conservative
Great Yarmouth	Labour	Labour	Labour	Conservative	Conservative	Conservative	Conservative
Mid Norfolk	Conservative	Conservative	Conservative	Conservative	Conservative	Conservative	Conservative
North Norfolk	Conservative	Liberal Democrat	Liberal Democrat	Liberal Democrat	Liberal Democrat	Liberal Democrat	Conservative
North West Norfolk	Labour	Conservative	Conservative	Conservative	Conservative	Conservative	Conservative
Norwich North	Labour	Labour	Labour	Conservative	Conservative	Conservative	Conservative
Norwich South	Labour	Labour	Labour	Liberal Democrat	Labour	Labour	Labour
South Norfolk	Conservative	Conservative	Conservative	Conservative	Conservative	Conservative	Conservative
South West Norfolk	Conservative	Conservative	Conservative	Conservative	Conservative	Conservative	Conservative

==== Suffolk (7) ====
Constituency	1997	2001	2005	2010	2015	2017	2019
Bury St Edmunds	Conservative	Conservative	Conservative	Conservative	Conservative	Conservative	Conservative
Central Suffolk and North Ipswich	Conservative	Conservative	Conservative	Conservative	Conservative	Conservative	Conservative
Ipswich	Labour	Labour	Labour	Conservative	Conservative	Labour	Conservative
South Suffolk	Conservative	Conservative	Conservative	Conservative	Conservative	Conservative	Conservative
Suffolk Coastal	Conservative	Conservative	Conservative	Conservative	Conservative	Conservative	Conservative
Waveney	Labour	Labour	Labour	Conservative	Conservative	Conservative	Conservative
West Suffolk	Conservative	Conservative	Conservative	Conservative	Conservative	Conservative	Conservative

=== Greater London (74 then 73) ===
==== North East London Boroughs (23 then 22) ====
The boroughs of Enfield, Haringey, Islington, Hackney, Tower Hamlets, Newham, Waltham Forest, Redbridge, Barking & Dagenham and Havering.

Constituency	1997	2001	2005	2010	2015	2017	2019
Barking	Labour	Labour	Labour	Labour	Labour	Labour	Labour
Bethnal Green and Bow	Labour	Labour	Respect	Labour	Labour	Labour	Labour
Chingford and Woodford Green	Conservative	Conservative	Conservative	Conservative	Conservative	Conservative	Conservative
Dagenham / Dagenham and Rainham (from 2010)	Labour	Labour	Labour	Labour	Labour	Labour	Labour
East Ham	Labour	Labour	Labour	Labour	Labour	Labour	Labour
Edmonton	Labour	Labour	Labour	Labour	Labour	Labour	Labour
Enfield North	Labour	Labour	Labour	Conservative	Labour	Labour	Labour
Enfield Southgate	Labour	Labour	Conservative	Conservative	Conservative	Labour	Labour
Hackney North and Stoke Newington	Labour	Labour	Labour	Labour	Labour	Labour	Labour
Hackney South and Shoreditch	Labour	Labour	Labour	Labour	Labour	Labour	Labour
Hornchurch	Labour	Labour	Conservative				
Hornsey and Wood Green	Labour	Labour	Liberal Democrat	Liberal Democrat	Labour	Labour	Labour
Ilford North	Labour	Labour	Conservative	Conservative	Labour	Labour	Labour
Ilford South	Labour	Labour	Labour	Labour	Labour	Labour	Labour
Islington North	Labour	Labour	Labour	Labour	Labour	Labour	Labour
Islington South and Finsbury	Labour	Labour	Labour	Labour	Labour	Labour	Labour
Leyton and Wanstead	Labour	Labour	Labour	Labour	Labour	Labour	Labour
Poplar and Canning Town / Poplar and Limehouse (2010)	Labour	Labour	Labour	Labour	Labour	Labour	Labour
Romford	Labour	Conservative	Conservative	Conservative	Conservative	Conservative	Conservative
Tottenham	Labour	Labour	Labour	Labour	Labour	Labour	Labour
Upminster / Hornchurch and Upminster (2010)	Labour	Conservative	Conservative	Conservative	Conservative	Conservative	Conservative
Walthamstow	Labour	Labour	Labour	Labour	Labour	Labour	Labour
West Ham	Labour	Labour	Labour	Labour	Labour	Labour	Labour

==== North West London Boroughs (20) ====
The boroughs of Hillingdon, Harrow, Brent, Ealing, Barnet, Camden, Hammersmith & Fulham, Kensington & Chelsea and Westminster, and the City of London.

Constituency	1997	2001	2005	2010	2015	2017	2019
Brent East Brent Central (from 2010)	Labour	Labour^{1}	Liberal Democrat	Liberal Democrat	Labour	Labour	Labour
Brent North	Labour	Labour	Labour	Labour	Labour	Labour	Labour
Brent South	Labour	Labour	Labour				
Chipping Barnet	Conservative	Conservative	Conservative	Conservative	Conservative	Conservative	Conservative
Cities of London and Westminster	Conservative	Conservative	Conservative	Conservative	Conservative	Conservative	Conservative
Ealing, Acton and Shepherd's Bush Ealing Central and Acton (from 2010)	Labour	Labour	Labour	Conservative	Labour	Labour	Labour
Ealing North	Labour	Labour	Labour	Labour	Labour	Labour	Labour
Ealing Southall	Labour	Labour	Labour	Labour	Labour	Labour	Labour
Finchley and Golders Green	Labour	Labour	Labour	Conservative	Conservative	Conservative	Conservative
Hammersmith (from 2010)				Labour	Labour	Labour	Labour
Hammersmith and Fulham Chelsea and Fulham (from 2010)	Labour	Labour	Conservative	Conservative	Conservative	Conservative	Conservative
Hampstead and Highgate Hampstead and Kilburn (from 2010)	Labour	Labour	Labour	Labour	Labour	Labour	Labour
Harrow East	Labour	Labour	Labour	Conservative	Conservative	Conservative	Conservative
Harrow West	Labour	Labour	Labour	Labour	Labour	Labour	Labour
Hayes and Harlington	Labour	Labour	Labour	Labour	Labour	Labour	Labour
Hendon	Labour	Labour	Labour	Conservative	Conservative	Conservative	Conservative
Holborn and St. Pancras	Labour	Labour	Labour	Labour	Labour	Labour	Labour
Kensington and Chelsea Kensington (from 2010)	Conservative	Conservative	Conservative	Conservative	Conservative	Labour	Conservative
Regent's Park and Kensington North Westminster North (from 2010)	Labour	Labour	Labour	Labour	Labour	Labour	Labour
Ruislip-Northwood Ruislip Northwood and Pinner (from 2010)	Conservative	Conservative	Conservative	Conservative	Conservative	Conservative	Conservative
Uxbridge Uxbridge and South Ruislip (from 2010)	Conservative	Conservative	Conservative	Conservative	Conservative	Conservative	Conservative

==== South East London Boroughs (16) ====
The boroughs of Lambeth, Southwark, Lewisham, Bromley, Greenwich and Bexley.

Constituency	1997	2001	2005	2010	2015	2017	2019
Beckenham	Conservative	Conservative	Conservative	Conservative	Conservative	Conservative	Conservative
Bexleyheath and Crayford	Labour	Labour	Conservative	Conservative	Conservative	Conservative	Conservative
Bromley and Chislehurst	Conservative	Conservative	Conservative	Conservative	Conservative	Conservative	Conservative
Camberwell and Peckham	Labour	Labour	Labour	Labour	Labour	Labour	Labour
Dulwich and West Norwood	Labour	Labour	Labour	Labour	Labour	Labour	Labour
Eltham	Labour	Labour	Labour	Labour	Labour	Labour	Labour
Erith and Thamesmead	Labour	Labour	Labour	Labour	Labour	Labour	Labour
Greenwich and Woolwich	Labour	Labour	Labour	Labour	Labour	Labour	Labour
Lewisham Deptford	Labour	Labour	Labour	Labour	Labour	Labour	Labour
Lewisham East	Labour	Labour	Labour	Labour	Labour	Labour	Labour
Lewisham West Lewisham West and Penge (from 2010)	Labour	Labour	Labour	Labour	Labour	Labour	Labour
North Southwark and Bermondsey Bermondsey and Old Southwark (from 2010)	Liberal Democrat	Liberal Democrat	Liberal Democrat	Liberal Democrat	Labour	Labour	Labour
Old Bexley and Sidcup	Conservative	Conservative	Conservative^{1}	Conservative	Conservative	Conservative	Conservative
Orpington	Conservative	Conservative	Conservative	Conservative	Conservative	Conservative	Conservative
Streatham	Labour	Labour	Labour	Labour	Labour	Labour	Labour
Vauxhall	Labour	Labour	Labour	Labour	Labour	Labour	Labour

==== South West London Boroughs (15) ====
The boroughs of Hounslow, Richmond, Kingston, Wandsworth, Merton, Sutton and Croydon.

Constituency	1997	2001	2005	2010	2015	2017	2019
Battersea	Labour	Labour	Labour	Conservative	Conservative	Labour	Labour
Brentford and Isleworth	Labour	Labour	Labour	Conservative	Labour	Labour	Labour
Carshalton and Wallington	Liberal Democrat	Liberal Democrat	Liberal Democrat	Liberal Democrat	Liberal Democrat	Liberal Democrat	Conservative
Croydon Central	Labour	Labour	Conservative^{1}	Conservative	Conservative	Labour	Labour
Croydon North	Labour	Labour	Labour	Labour	Labour	Labour	Labour
Croydon South	Conservative	Conservative	Conservative	Conservative	Conservative	Conservative	Conservative
Feltham and Heston	Labour	Labour	Labour	Labour	Labour	Labour	Labour
Kingston and Surbiton	Liberal Democrat	Liberal Democrat	Liberal Democrat	Liberal Democrat	Conservative	Liberal Democrat	Liberal Democrat
Mitcham and Morden	Labour	Labour	Labour	Labour	Labour	Labour	Labour
Putney	Labour	Labour	Conservative	Conservative	Conservative	Conservative	Labour
Richmond Park	Liberal Democrat	Liberal Democrat	Liberal Democrat	Conservative	Conservative	Conservative	Liberal Democrat
Sutton and Cheam	Liberal Democrat	Liberal Democrat	Liberal Democrat	Liberal Democrat	Conservative	Conservative	Conservative
Tooting	Labour	Labour	Labour	Labour	Labour	Labour	Labour
Twickenham	Liberal Democrat	Liberal Democrat	Liberal Democrat	Liberal Democrat	Conservative	Liberal Democrat	Liberal Democrat
Wimbledon	Labour	Labour	Conservative	Conservative	Conservative	Conservative	Conservative

^{1}MP sat as an Independent Conservative from Sep 2007 and an independent from Oct 2008

Seats:

Party	1997	2001	2005	2010	2015	2017	2019
Labour	9	9	6	4	5	7	8
Conservative	1	1	4	7	9	5	4
Liberal Democrat	5	5	5	4	1	3	3

Votes:

Party	1997	2001	2005	2010	2015	2017	2019
Labour	300,106	232,364	207,143	202,056	253,924		
Conservative	270,881	209,871	238,704	303,548	332,273		
Liberal Democrat	165,082	167,615	187,408	215,302	113,576		
UKIP					57,308		
Green					29,867		

==== London total seats ====
Party	1997	2001	2005	2010	2015	2017	2019
Labour	57	55	44	38	45	49	49
Conservative	11	13	21	28	27	21	21
Liberal Democrat	6	6	8	7	1	3	3
Respect			1				

=== North East England (30 then 29) ===
==== Cleveland (6) ====
Constituency	1997	2001	2005	2010	2015	2017	2019
Hartlepool	Labour	Labour	Labour	Labour	Labour	Labour	Labour^{1}
Middlesbrough	Labour	Labour	Labour	Labour	Labour	Labour	Labour
Middlesbrough South and East Cleveland	Labour	Labour	Labour	Labour	Labour	Conservative	Conservative
Redcar	Labour	Labour	Labour	Liberal Democrat	Labour	Labour	Conservative
Stockton North	Labour	Labour	Labour	Labour	Labour	Labour	Labour
Stockton South	Labour	Labour	Labour	Conservative	Conservative	Labour	Conservative

^{1} Seat won by the Conservatives in a May 2021 by-election

==== Durham (7) ====
Constituency	1997	2001	2005	2010	2015	2017	2019
Bishop Auckland	Labour	Labour	Labour	Labour	Labour	Labour	Conservative
City of Durham	Labour	Labour	Labour	Labour	Labour	Labour	Labour
Darlington	Labour	Labour	Labour	Labour	Labour	Labour	Conservative
Easington	Labour	Labour	Labour	Labour	Labour	Labour	Labour
North Durham	Labour	Labour	Labour	Labour	Labour	Labour	Labour
North West Durham	Labour	Labour	Labour	Labour	Labour	Labour	Conservative
Sedgefield	Labour	Labour	Labour	Labour	Labour	Labour	Conservative

==== Northumberland (4) ====
Constituency	1997	2001	2005	2010	2015	2017	2019
Berwick-upon-Tweed	Liberal Democrat	Liberal Democrat	Liberal Democrat	Liberal Democrat	Conservative	Conservative	Conservative
Blyth Valley	Labour	Labour	Labour	Labour	Labour	Labour	Conservative
Hexham	Conservative	Conservative	Conservative	Conservative	Conservative	Conservative	Conservative
Wansbeck	Labour	Labour	Labour	Labour	Labour	Labour	Labour

==== Tyne and Wear (13 then 12) ====
Constituency	1997	2001	2005	2010	2015	2017	2019
Blaydon	Labour	Labour	Labour	Labour	Labour	Labour	Labour
Gateshead East and Washington West / Washington and Sunderland West (from 2010)	Labour	Labour	Labour	Labour	Labour	Labour	Labour
Houghton and Washington East / Houghton and Sunderland South (from 2010)	Labour	Labour	Labour	Labour	Labour	Labour	Labour
Jarrow	Labour	Labour	Labour	Labour	Labour	Labour	Labour
Newcastle upon Tyne Central	Labour	Labour	Labour	Labour	Labour	Labour	Labour
Newcastle upon Tyne East and Wallsend / Newcastle upon Tyne East (from 2010)	Labour	Labour	Labour	Labour	Labour	Labour	Labour
Newcastle upon Tyne North	Labour	Labour	Labour	Labour	Labour	Labour	Labour
North Tyneside	Labour	Labour	Labour	Labour	Labour	Labour	Labour
South Shields	Labour	Labour	Labour	Labour	Labour	Labour	Labour
Sunderland North / Sunderland Central (from 2010)	Labour	Labour	Labour	Labour	Labour	Labour	Labour
Sunderland South	Labour	Labour	Labour				
Tyne Bridge / Gateshead (from 2010)	Labour	Labour	Labour	Labour	Labour	Labour	Labour
Tynemouth	Labour	Labour	Labour	Labour	Labour	Labour	Labour

=== North West England (76 then 75) ===
==== Cheshire (11) ====
Constituency	1997	2001	2005	2010	2015	2017	2019
City of Chester	Labour	Labour	Labour	Conservative	Labour	Labour	Labour
Congleton	Conservative	Conservative	Conservative	Conservative	Conservative	Conservative	Conservative
Crewe and Nantwich	Labour	Labour	Labour^{1}	Conservative	Conservative	Labour	Conservative
Eddisbury	Conservative	Conservative	Conservative	Conservative	Conservative	Conservative	Conservative
Ellesmere Port and Neston	Labour	Labour	Labour	Labour	Labour	Labour	Labour
Halton	Labour	Labour	Labour	Labour	Labour	Labour	Labour
Macclesfield	Conservative	Conservative	Conservative	Conservative	Conservative	Conservative	Conservative
Tatton	Independent	Conservative	Conservative	Conservative	Conservative	Conservative	Conservative
Warrington North	Labour	Labour	Labour	Labour	Labour	Labour	Labour
Warrington South	Labour	Labour	Labour	Conservative	Conservative	Labour	Conservative
Weaver Vale	Labour	Labour	Labour	Conservative	Conservative	Labour	Labour

^{1}seat gained by the Conservatives in a May 2008 by-election

==== Cumbria (6) ====
Constituency	1997	2001	2005	2010	2015	2017	2019
Barrow and Furness	Labour	Labour	Labour	Labour	Labour	Labour	Conservative
Carlisle	Labour	Labour	Labour	Conservative	Conservative	Conservative	Conservative
Copeland	Labour	Labour	Labour	Labour	Labour	Conservative	Conservative
Penrith and The Border	Conservative	Conservative	Conservative	Conservative	Conservative	Conservative	Conservative
Westmorland and Lonsdale	Conservative	Conservative	Liberal Democrat	Liberal Democrat	Liberal Democrat	Liberal Democrat	Liberal Democrat
Workington	Labour	Labour	Labour	Labour	Labour	Labour	Conservative

==== Greater Manchester (28 then 27) ====
Constituency	1997	2001	2005	2010	2015	2017	2019
Altrincham and Sale West	Conservative	Conservative	Conservative	Conservative	Conservative	Conservative	Conservative
Ashton-under-Lyne	Labour	Labour	Labour	Labour	Labour	Labour	Labour
Bolton North East	Labour	Labour	Labour	Labour	Labour	Labour	Conservative
Bolton South East	Labour	Labour	Labour	Labour	Labour	Labour	Labour
Bolton West	Labour	Labour	Labour	Labour	Conservative	Conservative	Conservative
Bury North	Labour	Labour	Labour	Conservative	Conservative	Labour	Conservative
Bury South	Labour	Labour	Labour	Labour	Labour	Labour	Conservative
Cheadle	Conservative	Liberal Democrat	Liberal Democrat	Liberal Democrat	Conservative	Conservative	Conservative
Denton and Reddish	Labour	Labour	Labour	Labour	Labour	Labour	Labour
Eccles	Labour	Labour	Labour				
Hazel Grove	Liberal Democrat	Liberal Democrat	Liberal Democrat	Liberal Democrat	Conservative	Conservative	Conservative
Heywood and Middleton	Labour	Labour	Labour	Labour	Labour	Labour	Conservative
Leigh	Labour	Labour	Labour	Labour	Labour	Labour	Conservative
Makerfield	Labour	Labour	Labour	Labour	Labour	Labour	Labour
Manchester Blackley Blackley and Broughton (from 2010)	Labour	Labour	Labour	Labour	Labour	Labour	Labour
Manchester Central	Labour	Labour	Labour	Labour	Labour	Labour	Labour
Manchester Gorton	Labour	Labour	Labour	Labour	Labour	Labour	Labour
Manchester Withington	Labour	Labour	Liberal Democrat	Liberal Democrat	Labour	Labour	Labour
Oldham East and Saddleworth	Labour	Labour	Labour	Labour	Labour	Labour	Labour
Oldham West and Royton	Labour	Labour	Labour	Labour	Labour	Labour	Labour
Rochdale	Labour	Labour	Liberal Democrat	Labour	Labour^{1}	Labour	Labour
Salford Salford and Eccles (from 2010)	Labour	Labour	Labour	Labour	Labour	Labour	Labour
Stalybridge and Hyde	Labour	Labour	Labour	Labour	Labour	Labour	Labour
Stockport	Labour	Labour	Labour	Labour	Labour	Labour	Labour
Stretford and Urmston	Labour	Labour	Labour	Labour	Labour	Labour	Labour
Wigan	Labour	Labour	Labour	Labour	Labour	Labour	Labour
Worsley Worsley and Eccles South (from 2010)	Labour	Labour	Labour	Labour	Labour	Labour	Labour
Wythenshawe and Sale East	Labour	Labour	Labour	Labour	Labour	Labour	Labour

^{1}MP sat as an independent from Dec 2015

==== Lancashire (15 then 16) ====
Constituency	1997	2001	2005	2010	2015	2017	2019
Blackburn	Labour	Labour	Labour	Labour	Labour	Labour	Labour
Blackpool North and Fleetwood / Blackpool North and Cleveleys (2010)	Labour	Labour	Labour	Conservative	Conservative	Conservative	Conservative
Blackpool South	Labour	Labour	Labour	Labour	Labour	Labour	Conservative
Burnley	Labour	Labour	Labour	Liberal Democrat	Labour	Labour	Conservative
Chorley	Labour	Labour	Labour	Labour	Labour	Labour	Speaker (Lab)
Fylde	Conservative	Conservative	Conservative	Conservative	Conservative	Conservative	Conservative
Hyndburn	Labour	Labour	Labour	Labour	Labour	Labour	Conservative
Lancaster and Fleetwood (2010)				Conservative	Labour	Labour	Labour
Lancaster and Wyre / Wyre and Preston North (2010)	Labour	Labour	Conservative	Conservative	Conservative	Conservative	Conservative
Morecambe and Lunesdale	Labour	Labour	Labour	Conservative	Conservative	Conservative	Conservative
Pendle	Labour	Labour	Labour	Conservative	Conservative	Conservative	Conservative
Preston	Labour	Labour	Labour	Labour	Labour	Labour	Labour
Ribble Valley	Conservative	Conservative	Conservative	Conservative^{1}	Conservative	Conservative	Conservative
Rossendale and Darwen	Labour	Labour	Labour	Conservative	Conservative	Conservative	Conservative
South Ribble	Labour	Labour	Labour	Conservative	Conservative	Conservative	Conservative
West Lancashire	Labour	Labour	Labour	Labour	Labour	Labour	Labour

^{1}MP sat as an independent Sep 2013 - Apr 2014

==== Merseyside (16 then 15) ====
Constituency	1997	2001	2005	2010	2015	2017	2019
Birkenhead	Labour	Labour	Labour	Labour	Labour	Labour	Labour
Bootle	Labour	Labour	Labour	Labour	Labour	Labour	Labour
Crosby Sefton Central (from 2010)	Labour	Labour	Labour	Labour	Labour	Labour	Labour
Knowsley North and Sefton East	Labour	Labour	Labour				
Knowsley South Knowsley (from 2010)	Labour	Labour	Labour	Labour	Labour	Labour	Labour
Liverpool Garston Garston and Halewood (from 2010)	Labour	Labour	Labour	Labour	Labour	Labour	Labour
Liverpool Riverside	Labour	Labour	Labour	Labour	Labour	Labour	Labour
Liverpool Walton	Labour	Labour	Labour	Labour	Labour	Labour	Labour
Liverpool Wavertree	Labour	Labour	Labour	Labour	Labour	Labour	Labour
Liverpool West Derby	Labour	Labour	Labour^{1}	Labour	Labour	Labour	Labour
St Helens North	Labour	Labour	Labour	Labour	Labour	Labour	Labour
St Helens South St Helens South and Whiston (from 2010)	Labour	Labour	Labour	Labour	Labour	Labour	Labour
Southport	Liberal Democrat	Liberal Democrat	Liberal Democrat	Liberal Democrat	Liberal Democrat	Conservative	Conservative
Wallasey	Labour	Labour	Labour	Labour	Labour	Labour	Labour
Wirral South	Labour	Labour	Labour	Labour	Labour	Labour	Labour
Wirral West	Labour	Labour	Labour	Conservative	Labour	Labour	Labour

^{1}MP sat as an independent from Sep 2007

=== South East England (83 then 84) ===
==== Berkshire (8) ====
Constituency	1997	2001	2005	2010	2015	2017	2019
Bracknell	Conservative	Conservative	Conservative	Conservative	Conservative	Conservative	Conservative
Maidenhead	Conservative	Conservative	Conservative	Conservative	Conservative	Conservative	Conservative
Newbury	Liberal Democrat	Liberal Democrat	Conservative	Conservative	Conservative	Conservative	Conservative
Reading East	Labour	Labour	Conservative	Conservative	Conservative	Labour	Labour
Reading West	Labour	Labour	Labour	Conservative	Conservative	Conservative	Conservative
Slough	Labour	Labour	Labour	Labour	Labour	Labour	Labour
Windsor	Conservative	Conservative	Conservative	Conservative	Conservative	Conservative	Conservative
Wokingham	Conservative	Conservative	Conservative	Conservative	Conservative	Conservative	Conservative

==== Buckinghamshire (7) ====
Constituency	1997	2001	2005	2010	2015	2017	2019
Aylesbury	Conservative	Conservative	Conservative	Conservative	Conservative	Conservative	Conservative
Beaconsfield	Conservative	Conservative	Conservative	Conservative	Conservative	Conservative	Conservative
Buckingham	Conservative	Conservative	Conservative^{1}	Speaker (Con)	Speaker (Con)	Speaker (Con)	Conservative
Chesham and Amersham	Conservative	Conservative	Conservative	Conservative	Conservative	Conservative	Conservative
North East Milton Keynes Milton Keynes North (from 2010)	Labour	Labour	Conservative	Conservative	Conservative	Conservative	Conservative
Milton Keynes South West Milton Keynes South (from 2010)	Labour	Labour	Labour	Conservative	Conservative	Conservative	Conservative
Wycombe	Conservative	Conservative	Conservative	Conservative	Conservative	Conservative	Conservative

^{1}MP sat as Speaker from Jun 2009

==== East Sussex (8) ====
Constituency	1997	2001	2005	2010	2015	2017	2019
Bexhill and Battle	Conservative	Conservative	Conservative	Conservative	Conservative	Conservative	Conservative
Brighton Kemptown	Labour	Labour	Labour	Conservative	Conservative	Labour	Labour
Brighton Pavilion	Labour	Labour	Labour	Green	Green	Green	Green
Eastbourne	Conservative	Conservative	Conservative	Liberal Democrat	Conservative	Liberal Democrat	Conservative
Hastings and Rye	Labour	Labour	Labour	Conservative	Conservative	Conservative	Conservative
Hove	Labour	Labour	Labour	Conservative	Labour	Labour	Labour
Lewes	Liberal Democrat	Liberal Democrat	Liberal Democrat	Liberal Democrat	Conservative	Conservative	Conservative
Wealden	Conservative	Conservative	Conservative	Conservative	Conservative	Conservative	Conservative

==== Hampshire (17 then 18) ====
Constituency	1997	2001	2005	2010	2015	2017	2019
Aldershot	Conservative	Conservative	Conservative	Conservative	Conservative	Conservative	Conservative
Basingstoke	Conservative	Conservative^{2}	Conservative	Conservative	Conservative	Conservative	Conservative
East Hampshire	Conservative	Conservative	Conservative	Conservative	Conservative	Conservative	Conservative
Eastleigh	Liberal Democrat	Liberal Democrat	Liberal Democrat	Liberal Democrat	Conservative	Conservative	Conservative
Fareham	Conservative	Conservative	Conservative	Conservative	Conservative	Conservative	Conservative
Gosport	Conservative	Conservative	Conservative	Conservative	Conservative	Conservative	Conservative
Havant	Conservative	Conservative	Conservative	Conservative	Conservative	Conservative	Conservative
Meon Valley				Conservative	Conservative	Conservative	Conservative
New Forest East	Conservative	Conservative	Conservative	Conservative	Conservative	Conservative	Conservative
New Forest West	Conservative	Conservative	Conservative	Conservative	Conservative	Conservative	Conservative
North East Hampshire	Conservative	Conservative	Conservative	Conservative	Conservative	Conservative	Conservative
North West Hampshire	Conservative	Conservative	Conservative	Conservative	Conservative	Conservative	Conservative
Portsmouth North	Labour	Labour	Labour	Conservative	Conservative	Conservative	Conservative
Portsmouth South	Liberal Democrat	Liberal Democrat	Liberal Democrat	Liberal Democrat^{1}	Conservative	Labour	Labour
Romsey Romsey and Southampton North (from 2010)	Conservative	Liberal Democrat	Liberal Democrat	Conservative	Conservative	Conservative	Conservative
Southampton Itchen	Labour	Labour	Labour	Labour	Conservative	Conservative	Conservative
Southampton Test	Labour	Labour	Labour	Labour	Labour	Labour	Labour
Winchester	Liberal Democrat	Liberal Democrat	Liberal Democrat	Conservative	Conservative	Conservative	Conservative

^{1}MP sat as an independent from Jun 2013

^{2}MP sat as an independent from Oct 2002

==== Isle of Wight (1) ====
Constituency	1997	2001	2005	2010	2015	2017	2019
Isle of Wight	Liberal Democrat	Conservative	Conservative	Conservative	Conservative	Conservative	Conservative

==== Kent (17) ====
Constituency	1997	2001	2005	2010	2015	2017	2019
Ashford	Conservative	Conservative	Conservative	Conservative	Conservative	Conservative	Conservative
Canterbury	Conservative	Conservative	Conservative	Conservative	Conservative	Labour	Labour
Chatham and Aylesford	Labour	Labour	Labour	Conservative	Conservative	Conservative	Conservative
Dartford	Labour	Labour	Labour	Conservative	Conservative	Conservative	Conservative
Dover	Labour	Labour	Labour	Conservative	Conservative	Conservative	Conservative
Faversham and Mid Kent	Conservative	Conservative	Conservative	Conservative	Conservative	Conservative	Conservative
Folkestone and Hythe	Conservative	Conservative	Conservative	Conservative	Conservative	Conservative	Conservative
Gillingham / Gillingham and Rainham (from 2010)	Labour	Labour	Labour	Conservative	Conservative	Conservative	Conservative
Gravesham	Labour	Labour	Conservative	Conservative	Conservative	Conservative	Conservative
Maidstone and The Weald	Conservative	Conservative	Conservative	Conservative	Conservative	Conservative	Conservative
Medway / Rochester and Strood (from 2010)	Labour	Labour	Labour	Conservative	Conservative	Conservative	Conservative
North Thanet	Conservative	Conservative	Conservative	Conservative	Conservative	Conservative	Conservative
Sevenoaks	Conservative	Conservative	Conservative	Conservative	Conservative	Conservative	Conservative
Sittingbourne and Sheppey	Labour	Labour	Labour	Conservative	Conservative	Conservative	Conservative
South Thanet	Labour	Labour	Labour	Conservative	Conservative	Conservative	Conservative
Tonbridge and Malling	Conservative	Conservative	Conservative	Conservative	Conservative	Conservative	Conservative
Tunbridge Wells	Conservative	Conservative	Conservative	Conservative	Conservative	Conservative	Conservative

==== Oxfordshire (6) ====
Constituency	1997	2001	2005	2010	2015	2017	2019
Banbury	Conservative	Conservative	Conservative	Conservative	Conservative	Conservative	Conservative
Henley	Conservative	Conservative	Conservative	Conservative	Conservative	Conservative	Conservative
Oxford East	Labour	Labour	Labour	Labour	Labour	Labour	Labour
Oxford West and Abingdon	Liberal Democrat	Liberal Democrat	Liberal Democrat	Conservative	Conservative	Liberal Democrat	Liberal Democrat
Wantage	Conservative	Conservative	Conservative	Conservative	Conservative	Conservative	Conservative
Witney	Conservative	Conservative	Conservative	Conservative	Conservative	Conservative	Conservative

==== Surrey (11) ====
Constituency	1997	2001	2005	2010	2015	2017	2019
East Surrey	Conservative	Conservative	Conservative	Conservative	Conservative	Conservative	Conservative
Epsom and Ewell	Conservative	Conservative	Conservative	Conservative	Conservative	Conservative	Conservative
Esher and Walton	Conservative	Conservative	Conservative	Conservative	Conservative	Conservative	Conservative
Guildford	Conservative	Liberal Democrat	Conservative	Conservative	Conservative	Conservative	Conservative
Mole Valley	Conservative	Conservative	Conservative	Conservative	Conservative	Conservative	Conservative
Reigate	Conservative	Conservative	Conservative	Conservative	Conservative	Conservative	Conservative
Runnymede and Weybridge	Conservative	Conservative	Conservative	Conservative	Conservative	Conservative	Conservative
South West Surrey	Conservative	Conservative	Conservative	Conservative	Conservative	Conservative	Conservative
Spelthorne	Conservative	Conservative	Conservative	Conservative	Conservative	Conservative	Conservative
Surrey Heath	Conservative	Conservative	Conservative	Conservative	Conservative	Conservative	Conservative
Woking	Conservative	Conservative	Conservative	Conservative	Conservative	Conservative	Conservative

==== West Sussex (8) ====
Constituency	1997	2001	2005	2010	2015	2017	2019
Arundel and South Downs	Conservative	Conservative	Conservative	Conservative	Conservative	Conservative	Conservative
Bognor Regis and Littlehampton	Conservative	Conservative	Conservative	Conservative	Conservative	Conservative	Conservative
Chichester	Conservative	Conservative	Conservative	Conservative	Conservative	Conservative	Conservative
Crawley	Labour	Labour	Labour	Conservative	Conservative	Conservative	Conservative
East Worthing and Shoreham	Conservative	Conservative	Conservative	Conservative	Conservative	Conservative	Conservative
Horsham	Conservative	Conservative	Conservative	Conservative	Conservative	Conservative	Conservative
Mid Sussex	Conservative	Conservative	Conservative	Conservative	Conservative	Conservative	Conservative
Worthing West	Conservative	Conservative	Conservative	Conservative	Conservative	Conservative	Conservative

=== South West England (51 then 55) ===
==== Avon (10 then 11) ====
Constituency	1997	2001	2005	2010	2015	2017	2019
Bath	Liberal Democrat	Liberal Democrat	Liberal Democrat	Liberal Democrat	Conservative	Liberal Democrat	Liberal Democrat
Bristol East	Labour	Labour	Labour	Labour	Labour	Labour	Labour
Bristol North West	Labour	Labour	Labour	Conservative	Conservative	Labour	Labour
Bristol South	Labour	Labour	Labour	Labour	Labour	Labour	Labour
Bristol West	Labour	Labour	Liberal Democrat	Liberal Democrat	Labour	Labour	Labour
Filton and Bradley Stoke				Conservative	Conservative	Conservative	Conservative
Kingswood	Labour	Labour	Labour	Conservative	Conservative	Conservative	Conservative
Northavon / Thornbury and Yate (from 2010)	Liberal Democrat	Liberal Democrat	Liberal Democrat	Liberal Democrat	Conservative	Conservative	Conservative
Wansdyke / North East Somerset (from 2010)	Labour	Labour	Labour	Conservative	Conservative	Conservative	Conservative
Weston-Super-Mare	Liberal Democrat	Liberal Democrat	Conservative	Conservative	Conservative	Conservative	Conservative
Woodspring / North Somerset (from 2010)	Conservative	Conservative	Conservative	Conservative	Conservative	Conservative	Conservative

==== Cornwall (5 then 6) ====
Constituency	1997	2001	2005	2010	2015	2017	2019
Falmouth and Camborne / Camborne and Redruth (from 2010)	Labour	Labour	Liberal Democrat	Conservative	Conservative	Conservative	Conservative
North Cornwall	Liberal Democrat	Liberal Democrat	Liberal Democrat	Liberal Democrat	Conservative	Conservative	Conservative
St Ives	Liberal Democrat	Liberal Democrat	Liberal Democrat	Liberal Democrat	Conservative	Conservative	Conservative
South East Cornwall	Liberal Democrat	Liberal Democrat	Liberal Democrat	Conservative	Conservative	Conservative	Conservative
Truro and St Austell / St Austell and Newquay (from 2010)	Liberal Democrat	Liberal Democrat	Liberal Democrat	Liberal Democrat	Conservative	Conservative	Conservative
Truro and Falmouth				Conservative	Conservative	Conservative	Conservative

==== Devon (11 then 12) ====
Constituency	1997	2001	2005	2010	2015	2017	2019
Central Devon CC				Conservative	Conservative	Conservative	Conservative
East Devon	Conservative	Conservative	Conservative	Conservative	Conservative	Conservative	Conservative
Exeter	Labour	Labour	Labour	Labour	Labour	Labour	Labour
North Devon	Liberal Democrat	Liberal Democrat	Liberal Democrat	Liberal Democrat	Conservative	Conservative	Conservative
Plymouth Devonport / Plymouth, Moor View (from 2010)	Labour	Labour	Labour	Labour	Conservative	Conservative	Conservative
Plymouth Sutton / Plymouth, Sutton and Devonport (from 2010)	Labour	Labour	Labour	Conservative	Conservative	Labour	Labour
South West Devon	Conservative	Conservative	Conservative	Conservative	Conservative	Conservative	Conservative
Teignbridge / Newton Abbot (from 2010)	Conservative	Liberal Democrat	Liberal Democrat	Conservative	Conservative	Conservative	Conservative
Tiverton and Honiton	Conservative	Conservative	Conservative	Conservative	Conservative	Conservative	Conservative
Torbay	Liberal Democrat	Liberal Democrat	Liberal Democrat	Liberal Democrat	Conservative	Conservative	Conservative
Torridge and West Devon	Liberal Democrat	Liberal Democrat	Conservative	Conservative	Conservative	Conservative	Conservative
Totnes	Conservative	Conservative	Conservative	Conservative	Conservative	Conservative	Conservative

==== Dorset (8) ====
Constituency	1997	2001	2005	2010	2015	2017	2019
Bournemouth East	Conservative	Conservative	Conservative	Conservative	Conservative	Conservative	Conservative
Bournemouth West	Conservative	Conservative	Conservative	Conservative	Conservative	Conservative	Conservative
Christchurch	Conservative	Conservative	Conservative	Conservative	Conservative	Conservative	Conservative
Mid Dorset and North Poole	Conservative	Liberal Democrat	Liberal Democrat	Liberal Democrat	Conservative	Conservative	Conservative
North Dorset	Conservative	Conservative	Conservative	Conservative	Conservative	Conservative	Conservative
Poole	Conservative	Conservative	Conservative	Conservative	Conservative	Conservative	Conservative
South Dorset	Conservative	Labour	Labour	Conservative	Conservative	Conservative	Conservative
West Dorset	Conservative	Conservative	Conservative	Conservative	Conservative	Conservative	Conservative

==== Gloucestershire (6) ====
Constituency	1997	2001	2005	2010	2015	2017	2019
Cheltenham	Liberal Democrat	Liberal Democrat	Liberal Democrat	Liberal Democrat	Conservative	Conservative	Conservative
Cotswold The Cotswolds (from 2010)	Conservative	Conservative	Conservative	Conservative	Conservative	Conservative	Conservative
Forest of Dean	Labour	Labour	Conservative	Conservative	Conservative	Conservative	Conservative
Gloucester	Labour	Labour	Labour	Conservative	Conservative	Conservative	Conservative
Stroud	Labour	Labour	Labour	Conservative	Conservative	Labour	Conservative
Tewkesbury	Conservative	Conservative	Conservative	Conservative	Conservative	Conservative	Conservative

==== Somerset (5) ====
Constituency	1997	2001	2005	2010	2015	2017	2019
Bridgwater / Bridgwater and West Somerset	Conservative	Conservative	Conservative	Conservative	Conservative	Conservative	Conservative
Somerton and Frome	Liberal Democrat	Liberal Democrat	Liberal Democrat	Liberal Democrat	Conservative	Conservative	Conservative
Taunton / Taunton Deane (from 2010)	Liberal Democrat	Conservative	Liberal Democrat	Liberal Democrat	Conservative	Conservative	Conservative
Wells	Conservative	Conservative	Conservative	Liberal Democrat	Conservative	Conservative	Conservative
Yeovil	Liberal Democrat	Liberal Democrat	Liberal Democrat	Liberal Democrat	Conservative	Conservative	Conservative

==== Wiltshire (6 then 7) ====
Constituency	1997	2001	2005	2010	2015	2017	2019
Chippenham				Liberal Democrat	Conservative	Conservative	Conservative
Devizes	Conservative	Conservative	Conservative	Conservative	Conservative	Conservative	Conservative
North Swindon	Labour	Labour	Labour	Conservative	Conservative	Conservative	Conservative
North Wiltshire	Conservative	Conservative	Conservative	Conservative	Conservative	Conservative	Conservative
Salisbury	Conservative	Conservative	Conservative	Conservative	Conservative	Conservative	Conservative
South Swindon	Labour	Labour	Labour	Conservative	Conservative	Conservative	Conservative
Westbury South West Wiltshire (from 2010)	Conservative	Conservative	Conservative	Conservative	Conservative	Conservative	Conservative

=== West Midlands (59) ===
==== Hereford and Worcester (8) ====
Constituency	1997	2001	2005	2010	2015	2017	2019
Bromsgrove	Conservative	Conservative	Conservative	Conservative	Conservative	Conservative	Conservative
Hereford Hereford and South Herefordshire (from 2010)	Liberal Democrat	Liberal Democrat	Liberal Democrat	Conservative	Conservative	Conservative	Conservative
Leominster North Herefordshire (from 2010)	Conservative	Conservative	Conservative	Conservative	Conservative	Conservative	Conservative
Mid Worcestershire	Conservative	Conservative	Conservative	Conservative	Conservative	Conservative	Conservative
Redditch	Labour	Labour	Labour	Conservative	Conservative	Conservative	Conservative
West Worcestershire	Conservative	Conservative	Conservative	Conservative	Conservative	Conservative	Conservative
Worcester	Labour	Labour	Labour	Conservative	Conservative	Conservative	Conservative
Wyre Forest	Labour	Health Concern	Health Concern	Conservative	Conservative	Conservative	Conservative

==== Shropshire (5) ====
Constituency	1997	2001	2005	2010	2015	2017	2019
Ludlow	Conservative	Liberal Democrat	Conservative	Conservative	Conservative	Conservative	Conservative
North Shropshire	Conservative	Conservative	Conservative	Conservative	Conservative	Conservative	Conservative
Shrewsbury and Atcham	Labour	Labour^{1}	Conservative	Conservative	Conservative	Conservative	Conservative
Telford	Labour	Labour	Labour	Labour	Conservative	Conservative	Conservative
The Wrekin	Labour	Labour	Conservative	Conservative	Conservative	Conservative	Conservative

^{1}MP defected to the Liberal Democrats shortly after election

==== Staffordshire (12) ====
Constituency	1997	2001	2005	2010	2015	2017	2019
Burton	Labour	Labour	Labour	Conservative	Conservative	Conservative	Conservative
Cannock Chase	Labour	Labour	Labour	Conservative	Conservative	Conservative	Conservative
Lichfield	Conservative	Conservative	Conservative	Conservative	Conservative	Conservative	Conservative
Newcastle-under-Lyme	Labour	Labour	Labour	Labour	Labour	Labour	Conservative
South Staffordshire	Conservative	Conservative	Conservative	Conservative	Conservative	Conservative	Conservative
Stafford	Labour	Labour	Labour	Conservative	Conservative	Conservative	Conservative
Staffordshire Moorlands	Labour	Labour	Labour	Conservative	Conservative	Conservative	Conservative
Stoke-on-Trent Central	Labour	Labour	Labour	Labour	Labour	Labour	Conservative
Stoke-on-Trent North	Labour	Labour	Labour	Labour	Labour	Labour	Conservative
Stoke-on-Trent South	Labour	Labour	Labour	Labour	Labour	Conservative	Conservative
Stone	Conservative	Conservative	Conservative	Conservative	Conservative	Conservative	Conservative
Tamworth	Labour	Labour	Labour	Conservative	Conservative	Conservative	Conservative

==== Warwickshire (5 then 6) ====
Constituency	1997	2001	2005	2010	2015	2017	2019
Kenilworth and Southam				Conservative	Conservative	Conservative	Conservative
North Warwickshire	Labour	Labour	Labour	Conservative	Conservative	Conservative	Conservative
Nuneaton	Labour	Labour	Labour	Conservative	Conservative	Conservative	Conservative
Rugby and Kenilworth Rugby (from 2010)	Labour	Labour	Conservative	Conservative	Conservative	Conservative	Conservative
Stratford-on-Avon	Conservative	Conservative	Conservative	Conservative	Conservative	Conservative	Conservative
Warwick and Leamington	Labour	Labour	Labour	Conservative	Conservative	Labour	Labour

==== West Midlands (county) (29 then 28) ====
Constituency	1997	2001	2005	2010	2015	2017	2019
Aldridge-Brownhills	Conservative	Conservative	Conservative	Conservative	Conservative	Conservative	Conservative
Birmingham Edgbaston	Labour	Labour	Labour	Labour	Labour	Labour	Labour
Birmingham Erdington	Labour	Labour	Labour	Labour	Labour	Labour	Labour
Birmingham Hall Green	Labour	Labour	Labour	Labour	Labour	Labour	Labour
Birmingham Hodge Hill	Labour	Labour	Labour	Labour	Labour	Labour	Labour
Birmingham Ladywood	Labour	Labour	Labour^{1}	Labour	Labour	Labour	Labour
Birmingham Northfield	Labour	Labour	Labour	Labour	Labour	Labour	Conservative
Birmingham Perry Barr	Labour	Labour	Labour	Labour	Labour	Labour	Labour
Birmingham Selly Oak	Labour	Labour	Labour	Labour	Labour	Labour	Labour
Birmingham Sparkbrook and Small Heath	Labour	Labour	Labour				
Birmingham Yardley	Labour	Labour	Liberal Democrat	Liberal Democrat	Labour	Labour	Labour
Coventry North East	Labour	Labour	Labour	Labour	Labour	Labour	Labour
Coventry North West	Labour	Labour	Labour	Labour	Labour	Labour	Labour
Coventry South	Labour	Labour	Labour	Labour	Labour	Labour	Labour
Dudley North	Labour	Labour	Labour	Labour	Labour	Labour	Conservative
Dudley South	Labour	Labour	Labour	Conservative	Conservative	Conservative	Conservative
Halesowen and Rowley Regis	Labour	Labour	Labour	Conservative	Conservative	Conservative	Conservative
Meriden	Conservative	Conservative	Conservative	Conservative	Conservative	Conservative	Conservative
Solihull	Conservative	Conservative	Liberal Democrat	Liberal Democrat	Conservative	Conservative	Conservative
Stourbridge	Labour	Labour	Labour	Conservative	Conservative	Conservative	Conservative
Sutton Coldfield	Conservative	Conservative	Conservative	Conservative	Conservative	Conservative	Conservative
Walsall North	Labour	Labour	Labour	Labour	Labour	Conservative	Conservative
Walsall South	Labour	Labour	Labour	Labour	Labour	Labour	Labour
Warley	Labour	Labour	Labour	Labour	Labour	Labour	Labour
West Bromwich East	Labour	Labour	Labour	Labour	Labour	Labour	Conservative
West Bromwich West	Speaker (Lab)	Labour	Labour	Labour	Labour	Labour	Conservative
Wolverhampton North East	Labour	Labour	Labour	Labour	Labour	Labour	Conservative
Wolverhampton South East	Labour	Labour	Labour	Labour	Labour	Labour	Labour
Wolverhampton South West	Labour	Labour	Labour	Conservative	Labour	Labour	Conservative

^{1}MP sat as Independent Labour from Oct 2006

=== Yorkshire and the Humber (56 then 54) ===
==== Humberside (10) ====
Constituency	1997	2001	2005	2010	2015	2017	2019
Beverley and Holderness	Conservative	Conservative	Conservative	Conservative	Conservative	Conservative	Conservative
Brigg and Goole	Labour	Labour	Labour	Conservative	Conservative	Conservative	Conservative
Cleethorpes	Labour	Labour	Labour	Conservative	Conservative	Conservative	Conservative
East Yorkshire	Conservative	Conservative	Conservative	Conservative	Conservative	Conservative	Conservative
Great Grimsby	Labour	Labour	Labour	Labour	Labour	Labour	Conservative
Haltemprice and Howden	Conservative	Conservative	Conservative	Conservative	Conservative	Conservative	Conservative
Kingston upon Hull East	Labour	Labour	Labour	Labour	Labour	Labour	Labour
Kingston upon Hull North	Labour	Labour	Labour	Labour	Labour	Labour	Labour
Kingston upon Hull West and Hessle	Labour	Labour	Labour	Labour	Labour	Labour	Labour
Scunthorpe	Labour	Labour	Labour	Labour	Labour	Labour	Conservative

==== North Yorkshire (8) ====
Constituency	1997	2001	2005	2010	2015	2017	2019
City of York York Central (from 2010)	Labour	Labour	Labour	Labour	Labour	Labour	Labour
Harrogate and Knaresborough	Liberal Democrat	Liberal Democrat	Liberal Democrat	Conservative	Conservative	Conservative	Conservative
Richmond (Yorks)	Conservative	Conservative	Conservative	Conservative	Conservative	Conservative	Conservative
Ryedale Thirsk and Malton (from 2010)	Conservative	Conservative	Conservative	Conservative	Conservative	Conservative	Conservative
Scarborough and Whitby	Labour	Labour	Conservative	Conservative	Conservative	Conservative	Conservative
Selby Selby and Ainsty (from 2010)	Labour	Labour	Labour	Conservative	Conservative	Conservative	Conservative
Skipton and Ripon	Conservative	Conservative	Conservative	Conservative	Conservative	Conservative	Conservative
Vale of York / York Outer (2010)	Conservative	Conservative	Conservative	Conservative	Conservative	Conservative	Conservative

==== South Yorkshire (15 then 14) ====
Constituency	1997	2001	2005	2010	2015	2017	2019
Barnsley Central	Labour	Labour	Labour	Labour^{1}	Labour	Labour	Labour
Barnsley East and Mexborough Barnsley East (from 2010)	Labour	Labour	Labour	Labour	Labour	Labour	Labour
Barnsley West and Penistone Penistone and Stocksbridge (from 2010)	Labour	Labour	Labour	Labour	Labour	Labour	Conservative
Don Valley	Labour	Labour	Labour	Labour	Labour	Labour	Conservative
Doncaster Central	Labour	Labour	Labour	Labour	Labour	Labour	Labour
Doncaster North	Labour	Labour	Labour	Labour	Labour	Labour	Labour
Rother Valley	Labour	Labour	Labour	Labour	Labour	Labour	Conservative
Rotherham	Labour	Labour	Labour	Labour^{2}	Labour	Labour	Labour
Sheffield Attercliffe Sheffield South East (from 2010)	Labour	Labour	Labour	Labour	Labour	Labour	Labour
Sheffield Brightside Sheffield Brightside and Hillsborough (from 2010)	Labour	Labour	Labour	Labour	Labour	Labour	Labour
Sheffield Central	Labour	Labour	Labour	Labour	Labour	Labour	Labour
Sheffield Hallam	Liberal Democrat	Liberal Democrat	Liberal Democrat	Liberal Democrat	Liberal Democrat	Labour	Labour
Sheffield Heeley	Labour	Labour	Labour	Labour	Labour	Labour	Labour
Sheffield Hillsborough	Labour	Labour	Labour				
Wentworth Wentworth and Dearne (from 2010)	Labour	Labour	Labour	Labour	Labour	Labour	Labour

^{1}MP sat as an independent May 2010 - Feb 2011

^{2}MP sat as an independent Oct 2010 - Jul 2012

==== West Yorkshire (23 then 22) ====
Constituency	1997	2001	2005	2010	2015	2017	2019
Batley and Spen	Labour	Labour	Labour	Labour	Labour	Labour	Labour
Bradford North Bradford East (from 2010)	Labour	Labour	Labour	Liberal Democrat	Labour	Labour	Labour
Bradford South	Labour	Labour	Labour	Labour	Labour	Labour	Labour
Bradford West	Labour	Labour	Labour	Labour^{1}	Labour	Labour	Labour
Calder Valley	Labour	Labour	Labour	Conservative	Conservative	Conservative	Conservative
Colne Valley	Labour	Labour	Labour	Conservative	Conservative	Labour	Conservative
Dewsbury	Labour	Labour	Labour	Conservative	Labour	Labour	Conservative
Elmet Elmet and Rothwell (from 2010)	Labour	Labour	Labour	Conservative	Conservative	Conservative	Conservative
Halifax	Labour	Labour	Labour	Labour	Labour	Labour	Labour
Hemsworth	Labour	Labour	Labour	Labour	Labour	Labour	Labour
Huddersfield	Labour	Labour	Labour	Labour	Labour	Labour	Labour
Keighley	Labour	Labour	Labour	Conservative	Conservative	Labour	Conservative
Leeds Central	Labour	Labour	Labour	Labour	Labour	Labour	Labour
Leeds East	Labour	Labour	Labour	Labour	Labour	Labour	Labour
Leeds North East	Labour	Labour	Labour	Labour	Labour	Labour	Labour
Leeds North West	Labour	Labour	Liberal Democrat	Liberal Democrat	Liberal Democrat	Labour	Labour
Leeds West	Labour	Labour	Labour	Labour	Labour	Labour	Labour
Morley and Rothwell Morley and Outwood (from 2010)	Labour	Labour	Labour	Labour	Conservative	Conservative	Conservative
Normanton	Labour	Labour	Labour				
Pontefract and Castleford Normanton, Pontefract and Castleford (from 2010)	Labour	Labour	Labour	Labour	Labour	Labour	Labour
Pudsey	Labour	Labour	Labour	Conservative	Conservative	Conservative	Conservative
Shipley	Labour	Labour	Conservative	Conservative	Conservative	Conservative	Conservative
Wakefield	Labour	Labour	Labour	Labour	Labour	Labour	Conservative

^{1}seat won by Respect in a 2012 by-election

== Northern Ireland (18) ==
Constituency	1997	2001	2005	2010	2015	2017	2019
Belfast East	Democratic Unionist	Democratic Unionist	Democratic Unionist	Alliance	Democratic Unionist	Democratic Unionist	Democratic Unionist
Belfast North	Ulster Unionist	Democratic Unionist	Democratic Unionist	Democratic Unionist	Democratic Unionist	Democratic Unionist	Sinn Féin
Belfast South	Ulster Unionist	Ulster Unionist^{1}	SDLP	SDLP	SDLP	Democratic Unionist	SDLP
Belfast West	Sinn Féin	Sinn Féin	Sinn Féin	Sinn Féin	Sinn Féin	Sinn Féin	Sinn Féin
East Antrim	Ulster Unionist	Ulster Unionist	Democratic Unionist	Democratic Unionist	Democratic Unionist	Democratic Unionist	Democratic Unionist
East Londonderry	Ulster Unionist	Democratic Unionist	Democratic Unionist	Democratic Unionist	Democratic Unionist	Democratic Unionist	Democratic Unionist
Fermanagh & South Tyrone	Ulster Unionist	Sinn Féin	Sinn Féin	Sinn Féin	Ulster Unionist	Sinn Féin	Sinn Féin
Foyle	SDLP	SDLP	SDLP	SDLP	SDLP	Sinn Féin	SDLP
Lagan Valley	Ulster Unionist	Ulster Unionist^{3}	Democratic Unionist	Democratic Unionist	Democratic Unionist	Democratic Unionist	Democratic Unionist
Mid Ulster	Sinn Féin	Sinn Féin	Sinn Féin	Sinn Féin	Sinn Féin	Sinn Féin	Sinn Féin
Newry & Armagh	SDLP	SDLP	Sinn Féin	Sinn Féin	Sinn Féin	Sinn Féin	Sinn Féin
North Antrim	Democratic Unionist	Democratic Unionist	Democratic Unionist	Democratic Unionist	Democratic Unionist	Democratic Unionist	Democratic Unionist
North Down	UK Unionist	Ulster Unionist	Ulster Unionist	Independent	Independent	Independent	Alliance
South Antrim	Ulster Unionist	Ulster Unionist^{2}	Democratic Unionist	Democratic Unionist	Ulster Unionist	Democratic Unionist	Democratic Unionist
South Down	SDLP	SDLP	SDLP	SDLP	SDLP	Sinn Féin	Sinn Féin
Strangford	Ulster Unionist	Democratic Unionist	Democratic Unionist	Democratic Unionist	Democratic Unionist	Democratic Unionist	Democratic Unionist
Upper Bann	Ulster Unionist	Ulster Unionist	Democratic Unionist	Democratic Unionist	Democratic Unionist	Democratic Unionist	Democratic Unionist
West Tyrone	Ulster Unionist	Sinn Féin	Sinn Féin	Sinn Féin	Sinn Féin	Sinn Féin	Sinn Féin

^{1}MP sat as an independent from Jun 2003 - Jan 2004

^{2}MP sat as an independent from Jun 2003 - Jan 2004

^{3}MP sat as an independent from Jun 2003 and defected to the Democratic Unionists in Jan 2004

== Scotland ==
The Fifth Periodical Review of the Boundary Commission for Scotland related the boundaries of new constituencies to those of Scottish local government council areas and to local government wards. Apart from a few minor adjustments, the council area boundaries dated from 1996 and the ward boundaries dated from 1999. Some council areas were grouped to form larger areas and, within these larger areas, some constituencies straddle council area boundaries.

=== Dumfries and Galloway (2 then 1) ===
Constituency	1997	2001	2005	2010	2015	2017	2019
Dumfriesshire	Labour	Labour					
Galloway and Upper Nithsdale Dumfries and Galloway (from 2005)	SNP	Conservative	Labour	Labour	SNP	Conservative	Conservative

=== Scottish Borders (2) ===
Constituency		1997	2001	2005	2010	2015	2017	2019
Roxburgh and Berwickshire Berwickshire, Roxburgh and Selkirk (from 2005)		Liberal Democrat	Liberal Democrat	Liberal Democrat	Liberal Democrat	SNP	Conservative	Conservative
Dumfriesshire, Clydesdale and Tweeddale	partially in Borders and Strathclyde			Conservative	Conservative	Conservative	Conservative	Conservative
Tweeddale, Ettrick and Lauderdale	partially in Lothian 1997–2005	Liberal Democrat	Liberal Democrat					

=== Lothian (10 then 9) ===
Constituency	1997	2001	2005	2010	2015	2017	2019
Edinburgh Central	Labour	Labour					
Edinburgh East and Musselburgh Edinburgh East (from 2005)	Labour	Labour	Labour	Labour	SNP	SNP	SNP
Edinburgh North and Leith	Labour	Labour	Labour	Labour	SNP	SNP	SNP
Edinburgh Pentlands Edinburgh South West (from 2005)	Labour	Labour	Labour	Labour	SNP	SNP	SNP
Edinburgh South	Labour	Labour	Labour	Labour	Labour	Labour	Labour
Edinburgh West	Liberal Democrat	Liberal Democrat	Liberal Democrat	Liberal Democrat	SNP^{1}	Liberal Democrat	Liberal Democrat
East Lothian	Labour	Labour	Labour	Labour	SNP	Labour	SNP
Linlithgow Linlithgow and East Falkirk (partially in Central, 2005-)	Labour	Labour	Labour	Labour	SNP	SNP	SNP
Livingston	Labour	Labour	Labour	Labour	SNP	SNP	SNP
Midlothian	Labour	Labour	Labour	Labour	SNP	Labour	SNP

^{1}MP sat as an independent from Sep 2015

=== Strathclyde (32 then 25) ===
Constituency	1997	2001	2005	2010	2015	2017	2019
Airdrie and Shotts	Labour	Labour	Labour	Labour	SNP	SNP	SNP
Argyll and Bute	Liberal Democrat	Liberal Democrat	Liberal Democrat	Liberal Democrat	SNP	SNP	SNP
Ayr	Labour	Labour					
Carrick, Cumnock and Doon Valley Ayr, Carrick and Cumnock (from 2005)	Labour	Labour	Labour	Labour	SNP	Conservative	SNP
Clydebank and Milngavie	Labour	Labour					
Clydesdale Lanark and Hamilton East (from 2005)	Labour	Labour	Labour	Labour	SNP	SNP	SNP
Coatbridge and Chryston Coatbridge, Chryston and Bellshill (from 2005)	Labour	Labour	Labour	Labour	SNP	Labour	SNP
Cumbernauld and Kilsyth Cumbernauld, Kilsyth and Kirkintilloch East (from 2005)	Labour	Labour	Labour	Labour	SNP	SNP	SNP
Cunninghame North North Ayrshire and Arran (from 2005)	Labour	Labour	Labour	Labour	SNP	SNP	SNP
Cunninghame South Central Ayrshire (from 2005)	Labour	Labour	Labour	Labour	SNP	SNP	SNP
Dumbarton West Dunbartonshire (from 2005)	Labour	Labour	Labour	Labour	SNP	SNP	SNP
East Kilbride East Kilbride, Strathaven & Lesmahagow (from 2005)	Labour	Labour	Labour	Labour	SNP	SNP	SNP
Eastwood East Renfrewshire (from 2005)	Labour	Labour	Labour	Labour	SNP	Conservative	SNP
Glasgow Anniesland Glasgow North West (from 2005)	Labour	Labour	Labour	Labour	SNP	SNP	SNP
Glasgow Baillieston Glasgow East (from 2005)	Labour	Labour	Labour^{2}	Labour	SNP^{1}	SNP	SNP
Glasgow Cathcart Glasgow South (from 2005)	Labour	Labour	Labour	Labour	SNP	SNP	SNP
Glasgow Central			Labour	Labour	SNP	SNP	SNP
Glasgow Govan	Labour	Labour					
Glasgow Kelvin	Labour	Labour^{4}					
Glasgow Maryhill Glasgow North (from 2005)	Labour	Labour	Labour	Labour	SNP	SNP	SNP
Glasgow Pollok Glasgow South West (from 2005)	Labour	Labour	Labour	Labour	SNP	SNP	SNP
Glasgow Rutherglen Rutherglen and Hamilton West (from 2005)	Labour	Labour	Labour	Labour	SNP	Labour	SNP
Glasgow Shettleston	Labour	Labour					
Glasgow Springburn Glasgow North East (from 2005)	Labour	Speaker (Labour)	Speaker (Labour)^{3}	Labour	SNP	Labour	SNP
Greenock and Inverclyde Inverclyde (from 2005)	Labour	Labour	Labour	Labour	SNP	SNP	SNP
Hamilton North and Bellshill	Labour	Labour					
Hamilton South	Labour	Labour					
Kilmarnock and Loudoun	Labour	Labour	Labour	Labour	SNP	SNP	SNP
Motherwell and Wishaw	Labour	Labour	Labour	Labour	SNP	SNP	SNP
Paisley North Paisley and Renfrewshire North (from 2005)	Labour	Labour	Labour	Labour	SNP	SNP	SNP
Paisley South Paisley and Renfrewshire South (from 2005)	Labour	Labour	Labour	Labour	SNP	SNP	SNP
Strathkelvin and Bearsden East Dunbartonshire (from 2005)	Labour	Labour	Liberal Democrat	Liberal Democrat	SNP	Liberal Democrat	SNP
West Renfrewshire	Labour	Labour					

^{1}MP sat as an independent from Nov 2015

^{2}seat gained by the SNP in a Jul 2008 by-election

^{3}seat gained by Labour in a Nov 2009 by-election

^{4}MP defected to the Respect Party in Jan 2004

=== Tayside (6 then 7) ===
Constituency		1997	2001	2005	2010	2015	2017	2019
Angus		SNP	SNP	SNP	SNP	SNP	Conservative	SNP
Dundee East		Labour	Labour	SNP	SNP	SNP	SNP	SNP
Dundee West		Labour	Labour	Labour	Labour	SNP	SNP	SNP
North Tayside Perth and North Perthshire (from 2005)		SNP	SNP	SNP	SNP	SNP	SNP	SNP
Ochil and South Perthshire	partially in Central 2005-			Labour	Labour	SNP	Conservative	SNP
Perth		SNP	SNP					

=== Central (4 then 2) ===
Constituency		1997	2001	2005	2010	2015	2017	2019
Falkirk East		Labour	Labour					
Falkirk West Falkirk (from 2005)		Labour	Labour	Labour	Labour^{1}	SNP	SNP	SNP
Ochil	partially in Tayside 1997–2005	Labour	Labour					
Stirling		Labour	Labour	Labour	Labour	SNP	Conservative	SNP

^{1}MP sat as an independent from Feb 2012

=== Fife (5 then 4) ===
Constituency	1997	2001	2005	2010	2015	2017	2019
Central Fife Glenrothes (from 2005)	Labour	Labour	Labour	Labour	SNP	SNP	SNP
Dunfermline East	Labour	Labour					
Dunfermline West Dunfermline and West Fife (from 2005)	Labour	Labour	Labour^{1}	Labour	SNP	SNP	SNP
Kirkcaldy Kirkcaldy and Cowdenbeath (from 2005)	Labour	Labour	Labour	Labour	SNP	Labour	SNP
North East Fife	Liberal Democrat	Liberal Democrat	Liberal Democrat	Liberal Democrat	SNP	SNP	Liberal Democrat

^{1}seat gained by the Liberal Democrats in a Feb 2006 by-election

=== Grampian (7 then 6) ===
Constituency	1997	2001	2005	2010	2015	2017	2019
Aberdeen Central	Labour	Labour					
Aberdeen North	Labour	Labour	Labour	Labour	SNP	SNP	SNP
Aberdeen South	Labour	Labour	Labour	Labour	SNP	Conservative	SNP
Banff and Buchan	SNP	SNP	SNP	SNP	SNP	Conservative	Conservative
Gordon	Liberal Democrat	Liberal Democrat	Liberal Democrat	Liberal Democrat	SNP	Conservative	SNP
Moray	SNP	SNP	SNP	SNP	SNP	Conservative	Conservative
West Aberdeenshire and Kincardine	Liberal Democrat	Liberal Democrat	Liberal Democrat	Liberal Democrat	SNP	Conservative	Conservative

=== Highland (5) ===
Constituency	1997	2001	2005	2010	2015	2017	2019
Caithness, Sutherland and Easter Ross	Liberal Democrat	Liberal Democrat	Liberal Democrat	Liberal Democrat	SNP	Liberal Democrat	Liberal Democrat
Inverness East, Nairn and Lochaber Inverness, Nairn, Badenoch and Strathspey (from 2005)	Labour	Labour	Liberal Democrat	Liberal Democrat	SNP	SNP	SNP
Na h-Eileanan an Iar	Labour	Labour	SNP	SNP	SNP	SNP	SNP
Orkney and Shetland	Liberal Democrat	Liberal Democrat	Liberal Democrat	Liberal Democrat	Liberal Democrat	Liberal Democrat	Liberal Democrat
Ross, Skye and Inverness West Ross, Skye and Lochaber (from 2005)	Liberal Democrat	Liberal Democrat	Liberal Democrat	Liberal Democrat	SNP	SNP	SNP

== Wales (40) ==
=== Gwynedd (4 then 3) ===
Constituency	1997	2001	2005	2010	2015	2017	2019
Caernarfon Arfon (from 2010)	Plaid Cymru	Plaid Cymru	Plaid Cymru	Plaid Cymru	Plaid Cymru	Plaid Cymru	Plaid Cymru
Conwy (partially in Clwyd 2003–2010)	Labour	Labour	Labour				
Meirionnydd Nant Conwy (partially in Clwyd 2003–2010) Dwyfor Meirionnydd (from 2010)	Plaid Cymru	Plaid Cymru	Plaid Cymru	Plaid Cymru	Plaid Cymru	Plaid Cymru	Plaid Cymru
Ynys Môn	Plaid Cymru	Labour	Labour	Labour	Labour	Labour	Conservative

Votes:

Party	1997	2001	2005	2010	2015	2017	2019
Labour							
Conservative							
Liberal Democrat							
Plaid Cymru							
UKIP							
Green							

=== Clwyd (6 then 7) ===
Constituency	1997	2001	2005	2010	2015	2017	2019
Aberconwy				Conservative	Conservative	Conservative	Conservative
Alyn and Deeside	Labour	Labour	Labour	Labour	Labour	Labour	Labour
Clwyd South (partially in Powys until 2010)	Labour	Labour	Labour	Labour	Labour	Labour	Conservative
Clwyd West	Labour	Labour	Conservative	Conservative	Conservative	Conservative	Conservative
Delyn	Labour	Labour	Labour	Labour	Labour	Labour	Conservative
Vale of Clwyd	Labour	Labour	Labour	Labour	Conservative	Labour	Conservative
Wrexham	Labour	Labour	Labour	Labour	Labour	Labour	Conservative

In 2003 the border between Gwynedd and Clwyd was shifted. Conwy and Meirionydd Nant Conwy went from being entirely within Gwynedd to being split between Gwynedd and Clwyd.

=== Dyfed (5) ===
Constituency	1997	2001	2005	2010	2015	2017	2019
Carmarthen East and Dinefwr	Labour	Plaid Cymru	Plaid Cymru	Plaid Cymru	Plaid Cymru	Plaid Cymru	Plaid Cymru
Carmarthen West and South Pembrokeshire	Labour	Labour	Labour	Conservative	Conservative	Conservative	Conservative
Ceredigion	Plaid Cymru	Plaid Cymru	Liberal Democrat	Liberal Democrat	Liberal Democrat	Plaid Cymru	Plaid Cymru
Llanelli	Labour	Labour	Labour	Labour	Labour	Labour	Labour
Preseli Pembrokeshire	Labour	Labour	Conservative	Conservative	Conservative	Conservative	Conservative

Votes:

Party	1997	2001	2005	2010	2015	2017	2019
Labour	92,958	67,289	59,224	53,756	52,090		
Conservative	39,084	38,155	40,683	51,901	52,002		
Liberal Democrat	22,597	22,307	31,761	38,299	16,836		
Plaid Cymru	47,082	52,105	50,164	43,462	41,059		
UKIP					23,416		
Green					6,610		

=== Powys (2) ===
Constituency	1997	2001	2005	2010	2015	2017	2019
Brecon and Radnorshire	Liberal Democrat	Liberal Democrat	Liberal Democrat	Liberal Democrat	Conservative	Conservative	Conservative
Montgomeryshire	Liberal Democrat	Liberal Democrat	Liberal Democrat	Conservative	Conservative	Conservative	Conservative

=== West Glamorgan (5) ===
Constituency	1997	2001	2005	2010	2015	2017	2019
Aberavon	Labour	Labour	Labour	Labour	Labour	Labour	Labour
Gower	Labour	Labour	Labour	Labour	Conservative	Labour	Labour
Neath	Labour	Labour	Labour	Labour	Labour	Labour	Labour
Swansea East	Labour	Labour	Labour	Labour	Labour	Labour	Labour
Swansea West	Labour	Labour	Labour	Labour	Labour	Labour	Labour

=== Mid Glamorgan (6) ===
Constituency	1997	2001	2005	2010	2015	2017	2019
Bridgend (partly in South Glamorgan until 2010)	Labour	Labour	Labour	Labour	Labour	Labour	Conservative
Cynon Valley	Labour	Labour	Labour	Labour	Labour	Labour	Labour
Merthyr Tydfil and Rhymney (partly in Gwent)	Labour	Labour	Labour	Labour	Labour	Labour	Labour
Ogmore	Labour	Labour	Labour	Labour	Labour	Labour	Labour
Pontypridd (partly in South Glamorgan until 2010)	Labour	Labour	Labour	Labour	Labour	Labour	Labour
Rhondda	Labour	Labour	Labour	Labour	Labour	Labour	Labour

=== South Glamorgan (5) ===
Constituency	1997	2001	2005	2010	2015	2017	2019
Cardiff Central	Labour	Labour	Liberal Democrat	Liberal Democrat	Labour	Labour	Labour
Cardiff North	Labour	Labour	Labour	Conservative	Conservative	Labour	Labour
Cardiff South and Penarth	Labour	Labour	Labour	Labour	Labour	Labour	Labour
Cardiff West	Labour	Labour	Labour	Labour	Labour	Labour	Labour
Vale of Glamorgan	Labour	Labour	Labour	Conservative	Conservative	Conservative	Conservative

=== Gwent (7) ===
Constituency	1997	2001	2005	2010	2015	2017	2019
Blaenau Gwent	Labour	Labour	Independent	Labour	Labour	Labour	Labour
Caerphilly	Labour	Labour	Labour	Labour	Labour	Labour	Labour
Islwyn	Labour	Labour	Labour	Labour	Labour	Labour	Labour
Monmouth	Labour	Labour	Conservative	Conservative	Conservative	Conservative	Conservative
Newport East	Labour	Labour	Labour	Labour	Labour	Labour	Labour
Newport West	Labour	Labour	Labour	Labour	Labour	Labour	Labour
Torfaen	Labour	Labour	Labour	Labour	Labour	Labour	Labour

Seats:

Party	1997	2001	2005	2010	2015	2017	2019
Labour	34	34	29	26	25	28	22
Conservative			3	8	11	8	14
Liberal Democrat	2	2	4	3	1		
Plaid Cymru	4	4	3	3	3	4	4
Independent			1				
