= John Loveridge =

British politician (1925–2007)

Sir John Loveridge

Member of Parliament for Upminster
- In office 28 February 1974 – 9 June 1983
- Preceded by: Constituency established
- Succeeded by: Nicholas Bonsor

Member of Parliament for Hornchurch
- In office 18 June 1970 – 28 February 1974
- Preceded by: Alan Lee Williams
- Succeeded by: Alan Lee Williams

Personal details
- Born: John Warren Loveridge; 9 September 1925 Bowdon, Cheshire, UK
- Died: 13 November 2007 (aged 82) London, UK
- Party: Conservative
- Spouse: Jean Chivers
- Children: 5
- Education: St John's College, Cambridge

Sir John Warren Loveridge (9 September 1925 – 13 November 2007) was a British Conservative Party Member of Parliament (MP) for 13 years, from 1970 to 1983. He was also the owner of a London secretarial college, a farmer in the West Country, and a published poet and an abstract sculptor.

== Early life ==
Loveridge was born in Bowdon in Cheshire, the son of Claude W Loveridge and his wife, Emily (née Malone). His father was a civil engineer and businessman who had been wounded at the Battle of the Somme, and his mother founded St Godric's College, a secretarial college in Hampstead, in 1921. He was educated privately, and studied engineering at St John's College, Cambridge.

After graduating, he worked in aviation, developing fighter aircraft from 1945 to 1947, but soon became the Vice-Principal of St Godric's College. He became Principal in 1954, retaining that position until the college closed in 1990. Author John Fowles taught at the college for nearly 10 years. Loveridge assisted a son, Michael, in founding Devonshire House Preparatory School. He and his wife also ran Lyndhurst House Preparatory School, both in Hampstead.

== Political career ==
Loveridge fought several elections for the Liberal Party, but joined the Conservative Party in 1949. He contested Aberavon in the 1951 general election, a Labour Party safe seat, and stood unsuccessfully for the London County Council in Brixton in 1952. He served as a Conservative member of Hampstead Borough Council from 1953 to 1959. He became a magistrate in London in 1963, but also acquired farming interests in the West Country. He bought the 1,800-acre (7.3 km^{2}) Bindon Manor estate near Axmouth in Devon in 1962, and restored the house.

He fought Hornchurch at the 1970 general election, winning back a seat that the Conservative Party had lost in 1966 with a majority of 5,830. After boundary changes in 1974, Hornchurch became a notional Labour seat, as a result he fought the more marginal newly created seat of Upminster, winning the two elections in February and October 1974 by 1,008 and then 694 votes respectively (meanwhile, Labour regained Hornchurch). He built a larger majority of 9,065 in 1979, and served on several influential backbench committees in the House of Commons. He retained the seat until he retired from parliament in 1983 to concentrate on his business interests. He continued to work for local constituency and regional party committees, and was knighted in 1988. He was the founder of the Dinosaurs Club for former Conservative MPs, serving as its chairman and later president, and also a liveryman of the Girdlers' Company.

== After Parliament ==
He retired to his farm in Devon, where his artistic side flourished in later years. He exhibited his contemporary sculptures and paintings in Devon, and held one-man exhibitions at the Royal British Society of Sculptors in 2000 and at Norwich Cathedral in 2001. He was also a published poet, with works including God Save the Queen: sonnets of Elizabeth I (1981), Hunter of the Moon (1983) and Hunter of the Sun (1984). He also published two books on sculpture, New Sculpture in Stone, Metal, Wood and Glass (2000) and To Seek Is To Find (2005), and one on business matters.

== Family ==
He married Jean Chivers in 1954. They had three sons and two daughters. He died in London in 2007 aged 82.

Parliament of the United Kingdom
Preceded by Alan Lee Williams	Member of Parliament for Hornchurch; 1970–February 1974	Succeeded by Alan Lee Williams
New constituency	Member of Parliament for Upminster; February 1974–1983	Succeeded by Sir Nicholas Bonsor
