= Alan Lee Williams =

British politician (born 1930)

Alan Lee Williams OBE

Member of Parliament for Hornchurch
- In office March 1966 – June 1970
- Preceded by: Godfrey Lagden
- Succeeded by: John Loveridge
- In office February 1974 – May 1979
- Preceded by: John Loveridge
- Succeeded by: Robin Squire

Warden of Toynbee Hall
- In office 1987–1992
- Preceded by: Donald Piers Chesworth
- Succeeded by: Alan Prescott

Personal details
- Born: 29 November 1930 (age 95)
- Party: Labour
- Other political affiliations: SDP

Alan Lee Williams OBE (born 29 November 1930) is a former president of the Atlantic Treaty Association, a British Labour Party politician, writer and visiting professor of politics at Queen Mary University of London.

== Early life ==
Williams was educated at The John Roan School, Greenwich and worked as a journeyman freeman and craft-owning freeman of the Company of Watermen and Lightermen, between 1945 and 1952, before attending Ruskin College, Oxford. He was elected a borough councillor in Greenwich in 1952, at the age of twenty-one, serving until 1955. He worked as the national youth officer of the Labour Party between 1955 and 1962 and then as the National Youth Officer of the United Nations Association between 1962 and 1966. Williams was chairman of the British National Committee of the World Assembly of Youth for four years.

== Political career ==
He first contested the safe Conservative seat of Epsom in 1964. He was elected as Member of Parliament (MP) for the marginal seat of Hornchurch three times, first winning the seat in 1966. He lost to the Conservative John Loveridge in 1970, but regained the seat in February, and was re-elected in October 1974. He was appointed Parliamentary Private Secretary to Denis Healey in his role as Defence Secretary from 1967 to 1970. In 1974, Williams was again appointed as a PPS to the Roy Mason, Defence Secretary, remaining in the role when Mason was appointed Secretary of State for Northern Ireland.

In 1979, Williams again lost his seat to the Conservatives, this time to Robin Squire, and he has not returned to the House of Commons since.

== After Parliament ==
In 1979, he was appointed Director-General of the English Speaking Union. In the 1980s, he joined the Social Democratic Party and became Chairman of the SDP's Defence Committee for four years, later rejoining the Labour Party. He was a long serving member of the Trilateral Commission and served on the Foreign Office's Advisory Board on Arms Control, and on the Lord Chancellor's Advisory Board on Public Records.

Williams first served with the European Movement as Deputy Director from 1970 until 1972, and as Director of the British Atlantic Committee between 1972 and 1974. From 1972 to 1973, he was Director of the Labour Committee for Europe. During this time he was awarded the Order of the British Empire for services to Europe. In 1978, he was Chairman of Peace through NATO, during the question over the Pershing Cruise Missile Deployment. In 1986 he became Director of the Atlantic Council of the United Kingdom, a member of the Atlantic Treaty Association. He served in this capacity until 2007. He was elected President of the Atlantic Treaty Association in 2000, serving until 2003, and from 2007 held the title of Honorary Vice-President for Life at the Atlantic Council.

In 1986, he was made Warden and Chief Executive of Toynbee Hall, the university settlement. He is Chairman of a number of major charities, including the Transport on Water Association and the Sir William Beveridge Foundation.

Williams has written and contributed to several books and articles, including A Radical Future (1966), Europe and the Open Sea (1966), Crisis in European Defence (1979), and other works on defence with his brother, Professor Geoffrey Lee Williams.

== Bibliography ==
- Times Guide to the House of Commons 1979
- Leigh Rayment's Peerage Pages

Parliament of the United Kingdom
Preceded by Godfrey Lagden	Member of Parliament for Hornchurch; 1966–1970	Succeeded by John Loveridge
Preceded by John Loveridge	Member of Parliament for Hornchurch; February 1974–1979	Succeeded by Robin Squire
