= Robin Squire =

British Conservative politician

Member of Parliament for Hornchurch
- In office 3 May 1979 – 8 April 1997
- Preceded by: Alan Lee Williams
- Succeeded by: John Cryer

Personal details
- Born: 12 July 1944 (age 82) London, England
- Party: Conservative
- Spouse: Susan Fey
- Occupation: Accountant

Robin Clifford Squire (born 12 July 1944) is a British Conservative politician. He was Member of Parliament for Hornchurch from 1979 until 1997 when he lost the seat to John Cryer.

Squire was born and raised in South West London. After qualifying as an accountant he was employed by a finance company while being a Conservative Party activist. He became a member of Sutton Borough Council in 1968, and the Member of Parliament for Hornchurch in 1979. During Margaret Thatcher's years (1979 to 1990) in government, Squire was considered to be a prominent "wet", opposed to the Conservative government's economic and employment policies. After Thatcher left office in 1990, Squire's political position strengthened, and he held junior ministerial positions until the Conservative government fell in 1997.

Squire was described in The Guardian as "a user-friendly Tory wet" and in The Times as "a minister who wears pebble glasses and always looks as though he lives in a bedsit."

After losing his seat in the 1997 general election, Squire struggled initially to find a new career. His difficulties in this regard were widely reported on in the media. Since 2002, he has been the Trust Secretary/Chief Executive for the Veolia ES Cleanaway Trusts, based in Rainham, a group of several environmental charities operating in Havering, Basildon and Castle Point, Essex.

== Early career ==
Squire was educated at Tiffin Grammar School, Kingston upon Thames and then qualified as a Chartered Accountant while working in a small City practice. He joined the accounting department of Lombard Banking in 1968 (a finance company that became a member of the National Westminster Bank group in 1970) and was promoted to the position of Deputy Chief Accountant at Lombard North Central in 1972. He held this post until he was elected to Parliament in 1979.

During this period he was a Conservative activist. Notably, he held various positions in the Greater London Young Conservatives including that of chairman in 1973. He was elected a member of Sutton Borough Council in 1968. Squire was the Conservative candidate for Hornchurch in the October 1974 general election although he lost the election by a 7,000 vote margin. In 1976, he became the Leader of Sutton Council.

At an early stage, he demonstrated a political position on the left of the Conservative Party. At the Conservative Party Conference in 1973 he was booed when he opposed a motion calling on the Government to recognise the white minority regime in Rhodesia. At the Conservative Local Government Conference in 1977, Squire was one of five council leaders who spoke against plans advanced by Keith Speed (then Conservative local government spokesman) to abolish the domestic rating system. Squire warned that abolition of the rating system without a widely accepted alternative to put in its place might be highly damaging.

During the period 1970 to 1979, both Conservative and Labour administrations promoted the move to comprehensive education. As Leader of Sutton Council, Squire advocated a move to comprehensive education in the Borough that would be phased in by 1984. However, in 1978 Labour Education Secretary Shirley Williams pressed for an end to selective education in the Borough by 1980. This resulted in a stand-off and Squire threatened legal action against the government to prevent an earlier move to comprehensives. The advent of a new Conservative government in May 1979 allowed Sutton to remain as an isolated pocket of selective education and grammar schools. After the Liberal Democrats took control of the Council in 1986 selective education was retained.

Squire was elected to Parliament as the member for Hornchurch on 3 May 1979. Labour-held Hornchurch had not been a marginal seat and Squire had not expected to win it. However, he was elected with a 769-vote majority on a "freak" 8.5% swing. At this point, he stood down as leader of Sutton Borough Council and gave up his Council seat in 1982.

Squire married Susan Fey, a Labour Party activist, in 1981. Questioned about the marriage, Fey stated that she was on the right wing of the Labour Party and her husband was on the left of the Conservative Party. As such, she considered that there was no great political difference between them. The couple had two children (one son and one daughter) by Fey's previous marriage, and divorced in 2007.

== Parliamentary career ==
Upon entering Parliament, Squire was soon established as one of the "wet" group of Conservative MPs who opposed many aspects of the economic, employment and social policies of the Thatcher government. For example, in 1981 Squire was one of 18 Conservative rebels who opposed referendum provisions for local council rate increases. In 1987 he opposed the introduction of the community charge (or 'poll tax') and in 1988 he was one of 20 Conservative rebels to vote against the freezing of child benefits. During the 1980s, he sponsored a successful 'freedom of information' private members bill and participated in cross-party pressure groups involved with homeless people. In 1988 Squire was the only Conservative MP to vote against Section 28, legislation which sought to prevent local authorities from promoting awareness of gay issues. He became particularly well known for his regular contributions to Capital Radio's "Party Pieces" programme and he was described in The Times diary as being "pleasingly unsycophantic".

He appeared to be comfortable as a member of the 'Parliamentary club'. He was reported to be a prominent and popular member of the Guy Fawkes club – a dining club composed of Conservative MPs first elected in 1979. Other members of the Guy Fawkes club included John Major and Brian Mawhinney. He was rated as a highly capable member of the House of Commons bridge team and acquitted himself well in tournaments.

Squire consistently expressed misgivings over the personal leadership style of Margaret Thatcher, describing her as "a good wartime leader, but ...." This, combined with his status as a "dripping" or "oceanic" wet meant that promotion was slow in coming. The only significant office he held during the Thatcher governments was that of Parliamentary Private Secretary to Transport Secretary Lynda Chalker between 1983 and 1985. In 1980 he was ousted from the Secretaryship of the Conservative backbench European Committee by a Eurosceptic.

However, his prospects suddenly improved when Major became Prime Minister in 1990 and early in 1991, he became PPS to Chris Patten MP, the Chairman of the Conservative Party.

== Ministerial career ==
On 14 April 1992, in the immediate aftermath of the 1992 United Kingdom general election, Squire was appointed Under Secretary of State for the Environment. In this capacity he was variously described as the "inner cities minister" or the "local government minister". His background as a council leader made him an obvious choice for this role and he appeared to work harmoniously with Michael Howard, the then Secretary of State for the Environment.

However, on 28 May 1993 he was moved to the post of Under Secretary of State for Education, serving under Secretary of State John Patten and later Gillian Shephard. In this capacity he was generally known as the "schools minister" and occasionally as the "school discipline minister". He held this post until the Conservative government fell in May 1997. The official reason given for the move was that one of the other education ministers (Baroness Blatch) sat in the House of Lords and it was felt that an experienced House of Commons operator like Squire was needed to front government policy on schools.

During his four years as Schools Minister, Squire was involved in many high-profile issues. These included the introduction of the OFSTED schools inspection regime, published league tables for school performance, the ability of state sector schools to opt out of local authority control as "grant-maintained" schools, nursery education vouchers and the introduction of the first state funded Muslim schools. Many of these reforms survived the change of government in 1997 and became features of Labour education policy.

He is reported to have "barked down" some of the more extreme proposals to deal with the threat of school shootings after the Dunblane massacre in 1996, in which a crazed individual with a gun entered a primary school, shooting a number of pupils and teachers.

During the final months of the Major government, Squire was identified with the "Conservative Mainstream" group of MPs. This group was composed of centrist, one-nation members who sided with Major in his confrontations with Eurosceptics and right-wingers.

In the 1997 United Kingdom general election, Squire was defending a 9,165 majority in his constituency at Hornchurch. His personal popularity plus his prominence as a Minister led him to believe that he would hold the seat, saying "This was the one time when I thought my seat was safe...". However, he lost the seat to Labour's John Cryer with a 16% swing and a 5,680 majority for his opponent.

== After Parliament ==
Around 150 Conservative MPs lost their seats in the 1997 general election. Many of them struggled to find gainful employment and a new role in life for themselves. This was particularly difficult for former ministers who had become accustomed to the status, emoluments and perks that went with their old jobs.

Squire initially considered a return to accountancy but he had difficulty in this regard because he had not updated his skills since leaving the profession in 1979. For example, he was initially unable to use a computer spreadsheet or a scientific calculator – essential tools for an accountant by 1997. He applied for the post of general manager of the Dolphin Square residential complex in Pimlico, London at a salary of £30,000 but was turned down, albeit as the runner-up for the post. He applied for the position of bursar at several independent schools but was rejected by all of them. "His only independent income in the first four months of his enforced leisure came when he won 20 pounds on a Sunday Times brain-teaser competition"

He eventually "signed on" for Job Seeker's Allowance. He was given counselling and directed to courses on interview technique, assertiveness and IT skills. Squire gradually developed a portfolio of part-time appointments. In 1999, he served for a short period as a National Lottery Commissioner (salary £6,200) and he was later appointed as a schools adjudicator by the Department of Education. It is believed that he took up a number of other such posts in the voluntary and NGO sectors. He also acted, until March 2000, as a Parliamentary lobbyist.

Squire stood against John Cryer at Hornchurch in the 2001 general election, but lost again by a significant majority. He has not been politically active since that time.

Parliament of the United Kingdom
Preceded by Alan Lee Williams	Member of Parliament for Hornchurch; 1979–1997	Succeeded by John Cryer
