= Godfrey Lagden (politician) =

British politician

Godfrey William Lagden (12 April 1906 – 31 August 1989) was a British Conservative Party politician who was the Member of Parliament (MP) for Hornchurch from 1955 to 1966.

== Background ==
Lagden was born in Richmond, Surrey, where he was educated at Richmond Hill School. He worked for Sun Insurance from 1931 to 1934 and then for IBM. He was a special constable with the Essex County Constabulary during World War II.

== Politics ==
Lagden entered politics after the war; he was elected to the Hornchurch Urban District in 1948 and to the Essex County Council in 1949. He was the unsuccessful Conservative candidate for Thurrock at the 1951 election. In 1955, he was elected Member of Parliament (MP) for the marginal constituency of Hornchurch, winning the seat from Labour. The Daily Telegraph described him as a member of the party's right who "oppos[ed] Rhodesian sanctions and the abolition of capital punishment". Lagden held Hornchurch until his defeat at the 1966 general election by the Labour candidate Alan Lee Williams.

== Personal life and death ==
Lagden was married to the former Dorothy Blanche Wheeler from 1932 until her death in 1987. He died in the London Borough of Havering on 31 August 1989, at the age of 83.

Parliament of the United Kingdom
Preceded by Geoffrey Bing	Member of Parliament for Hornchurch; 1955–1966	Succeeded by Alan Lee Williams
