= Nicholas Bonsor =

British politician (1942–2023)

The Right Honourable Sir Nicholas Bonsor Bt DL

Minister of State for Foreign Affairs
- In office 5 July 1995 – 5 May 1997
- Prime Minister: John Major
- Preceded by: Douglas Hogg
- Succeeded by: Tony Lloyd

Member of Parliament for Upminster
- In office 9 June 1983 – 8 April 1997
- Preceded by: John Loveridge
- Succeeded by: Keith Darvill

Member of Parliament for Nantwich
- In office 3 May 1979 – 13 May 1983
- Preceded by: John Cockroft
- Succeeded by: Constituency abolished

Personal details
- Born: 9 December 1942 London, England
- Died: 21 March 2023 (aged 80)
- Party: Conservative
- Education: Eton College; Keble College, Oxford

Sir Nicholas Cosmo Bonsor, 4th Baronet, DL (9 December 1942 – 21 March 2023) was a British Conservative politician.

== Early life ==
Bonsor was educated at Eton College and Keble College, Oxford.

== Political career ==
Having unsuccessfully fought Newcastle-under-Lyme in both February and October 1974 elections, Bonsor was Member of Parliament for Nantwich from 1979 to 1983, then for Upminster from 1983 until he lost the seat to Labour's Keith Darvill in 1997. He was Minister of State for Foreign Affairs from 1995 to 1997 and practised as a barrister in London.

In 1994, just before he became a minister, Bonsor had challenged the incumbent Sir Marcus Fox for the chairmanship of the influential 1922 Committee, and narrowly lost by 129 votes to 116. Bonsor, a Eurosceptic, had previously rebelled against the government by voting several times against the ratification of the Maastricht Treaty in the 1992-93 parliamentary session.

== Post-Parliamentary career ==
Bonsor lived at Liscombe Park near Soulbury in Buckinghamshire and was a Deputy Lieutenant of Buckinghamshire.

Bonsor pledged support, by appearing together in a public meeting, to Nigel Farage MEP in his 2010 general election campaign for the Buckingham constituency, standing against the speaker of the House (standing for re-election), John Bercow.

Bonsor was a vice-president of the Standing Council of the Baronetage.

== Personal life and death ==
Sir Nicholas Bonsor was the elder son of Sir Bryan Bonsor (1916–1977) and his wife Elizabeth Hambro (1920–1995). In 1969, he married Hon. Nadine Marisa Lampson, now the Hon. Lady Bonsor, a daughter of Graham Curtis Lampson, 2nd Baron Killearn. They had five children, including Sir Alexander Cosmo Walrond Bonsor (b. 1976) and entrepreneur Mary Bonsor (b. 1987).

Bonsor died on 21 March 2023, at the age of 80. His eldest son Alexander succeeded to the baronetcy as the 5th Baronet.

== Notes ==
Parliament of the United Kingdom
Preceded by John Cockroft	Member of Parliament for Nantwich; 1979–1983	Constituency abolished
Preceded by John Loveridge	Member of Parliament for Upminster; 1983–1997	Succeeded by Keith Darvill
Baronetage of the United Kingdom
Preceded by Bryan Cosmo Bonsor	Baronet (of Kingswood); 1977–2023	Succeeded by Alexander Cosmo Walrond Bonsor
