= John Cockcroft (politician) =

British Conservative politician (1934–2023)

John Hoyle Cockcroft (6 July 1934 – 25 April 2023) was a British Conservative politician and journalist.

== Early life and education ==
Cockcroft was born on 6 July 1934 in Todmorden, Yorkshire, to Lionel Cockroft and Jenny Hoyle. He was educated at Oundle School, and attended St John's College, Cambridge, as a senior major scholar, graduating with a degree in History and Economics in 1958. That same year, he was elected president of the Cambridge Union Society. He served as a lieutenant in the British Army from 1953 to 1955.

== Career ==
Cockcroft worked as a journalist from 1959 to 1974, and again from 1981 through to 1986, writing for the Financial Times, Daily Telegraph, and Sunday Telegraph. He was member of parliament for Nantwich in Cheshire from February 1974 until his retirement in 1979. He served on numerous boards and commissions.

== Personal life and death ==
In 1971, Cockcroft married Tessa Shepley. They had three daughters. In retirement, Cockcroft lived in Chelmsford. He continued to write and read, despite failing eyesight. Cockcroft died on 25 April 2023, at the age of 88.

Cockcroft's uncle was the Nobel-prize winning physicist Sir John Cockcroft.

Parliament of the United Kingdom
Preceded by Robert Grant-Ferris	Member of Parliament for Nantwich; 1974–1979	Succeeded by Sir Nicholas Bonsor
