= Secretarial school =

Type of educational institution

A secretarial school or secretarial college is an educational institution that specializes in teaching its students to work as a secretary.

The entry requirements for the profession of secretary in the 19th and 20th centuries were low: having shorthand and typing skills were the only skills required for the position. After finishing high school or after reaching the allowed age for workforce entry, if needed it was possible take courses lasting several weeks, to learn how to write shorthand and typing, which advanced entry into a shorthand or writing pool secretary position; these schools or private schools offering courses in typing, for example, existed as early as the 1880s. "For example, a secretarial school might offer programs of training leading to positions as a clerk-typist, receptionist, secretary, stenographer, or typist". In turn, secretarial schools may influence perceptions of what tasks are appropriate to be performed by a secretary.

By the 1990s it was noted that "[t]he term 'secretarial school' itself has become antiquated in the United States; today most business and secretarial schools leave the word 'secretarial' out of their name".

== Institutions ==
In 1911, Katharine Gibbs and her sister Mary Ryan opened their first secretarial school, Gibbs College, in Providence, Rhode Island. Initially, the school was not marketed specifically to women, but labor shortages from World War I pushed more women into the work space and, by 1917, the school was advertising “Secretarial Training for Educated Women”. The Gibbs schools promoted a message of female empowerment, while focusing on the type of education that would be most valuable to women at the time. The Gibbs schools promoted the ideas that secretarial training was the path to a career for women. Capitalizing on gender-based restrictions of the time, Gibbs created an educational empire.

To set it apart from other secretarial schools of the era, the Gibbs school was marketed as selecting only women of a high socioeconomic status, making them highly appealing to young women from elite backgrounds. Gibbs distinguished her schools from her competitors, and she did so by offering courses in dressing appropriately, serving tea, and other societal refinements.

The Oxford & County Secretarial College (the "Ox and Cow") was a prestigious secretarial school for young women centrally located in the university City of Oxford. Founded in 1936 by the Hall family (Ernest and Irene Hall), it moved to its well-known central location at 34 St. Giles in 1952, where it was based until 1999.

Hagerstown Business College, founded in 1938 by Edward J. Hajek, offered programs in bookkeeping, general business and secretarial studies. In 1949, the school developed a specialized medical secretarial program ("Maryland Medical Secretarial School") becoming one of the first schools in the country to offer such a program. A specialized legal secretarial program was later added around 1961.

With the rise of feminism in the 1960s and 1970s secretarial schools began to fade. In 1968, the Gibbs family sold the schools to corporate buyers, who worked to transition the schools' identity over the years.
