= Nantwich (constituency) =

Parliamentary constituency in the United Kingdom, 1955–1983

- Former county constituency for the House of Commons
- Boundary of Nantwich in Cheshire, boundaries 1974–1983
- County: Cheshire

1955–1983
- Seats: One
- Created from: Crewe and Northwich
- Replaced by: Crewe & Nantwich, Eddisbury and Congleton

Nantwich was a parliamentary constituency in Cheshire which returned one Member of Parliament (MP) to the House of Commons of the Parliament of the United Kingdom, elected using the first-past-the-post voting system.

== History ==
Nantwich was created for the 1955 general election from parts of the Crewe and Northwich constituencies.

It was abolished following the reorganisation of local authorities in 1974 by the Third Periodic Review of Westminster constituencies for the 1983 general election, when it was divided between the re-established constituency of Eddisbury and the new constituencies of Crewe and Nantwich, and Congleton.

== Boundaries ==
1955–1974: The Urban Districts of Middlewich, Nantwich, and Winsford, and parts of the Rural Districts of Nantwich, Northwich, and Tarvin.

The Urban District and the bulk of the Rural District of Nantwich were transferred from Crewe. Middlewich, Winsford, the southern part of the Rural District of Tarvin (including Malpas) and a small part of the Rural District of Northwich were transferred from Northwich.

1974–1983: As prior, with very minor changes to the boundaries.

From 1 April 1974 until the constituency was abolished at the next boundary review which came into effect for the 1983 general election, the constituency comprised parts of the expanded City of Chester and newly formed Boroughs of Crewe and Nantwich, and Vale Royal, but its boundaries were unchanged.

On abolition, Nantwich and surrounding rural areas were included in Crewe and Nantwich; Malpas and Winsford in Eddisbury; and Middlewich in Congleton.

== Members of Parliament ==
Election	Member	Party
1955	Robert Grant-Ferris	Conservative
Feb 1974	John Cockcroft	Conservative
1979	Nicholas Bonsor	Conservative
1983	constituency abolished: see Eddisbury & Crewe and Nantwich	

== Elections ==
=== Elections in the 1950s ===
General election 1955: Nantwich
Party	Candidate	Votes	%	±%
Conservative	Robert Grant Grant-Ferris	20,250	61.1	
Labour	Leslie Knight	12,884	38.9	
Majority		7,366	22.2	
Turnout		33,134	77.6	
Conservative win (new seat)				

General election 1959: Nantwich
Party	Candidate	Votes	%	±%
Conservative	Robert Grant Grant-Ferris	17,613	48.3	−12.8
Labour	Leslie Knight	10,876	29.8	−9.1
Liberal	Guy Harvey	7,983	21.9	New
Majority		6,737	18.5	−3.7
Turnout		36,472	83.6	+6.0
Conservative hold		Swing	-1.8	

=== Elections in the 1960s ===
General election 1964: Nantwich
Party	Candidate	Votes	%	±%
Conservative	Robert Grant Grant-Ferris	17,171	43.4	−3.9
Labour	James Golding	11,254	30.4	+0.6
Liberal	David Anthony Ridgeway Green	8,613	23.3	+1.4
Majority		5,917	16.0	−2.5
Turnout		37,038	81.6	−2.0
Conservative hold		Swing	-2.2	

General election 1966: Nantwich
Party	Candidate	Votes	%	±%
Conservative	Robert Grant Grant-Ferris	16,543	43.8	+0.4
Labour	Donald Anthony Kean	14,310	37.9	+3.5
Liberal	David Anthony Ridgeway Green	6,950	18.4	−4.9
Majority		2,233	5.9	−11.1
Turnout		37,803	79.3	−2.3
Conservative hold		Swing	-1.5	

=== Elections in the 1970s ===
General election 1970: Nantwich
Party	Candidate	Votes	%	±%
Conservative	Robert Grant Grant-Ferris	20,397	46.2	+2.4
Labour	David Beetham	15,124	34.3	−4.6
Liberal	Roger Newell Cuss	8,595	19.5	+1.1
Majority		5,273	11.9	+6.0
Turnout		44,116	77.5	−1.8
Conservative hold		Swing	+3.5	

General election February 1974: Nantwich
Party	Candidate	Votes	%	±%
Conservative	John Hoyle Cockcroft	21,474	43.4	−2.8
Labour	Adrian Edward Bailey	16,306	33.0	−1.3
Liberal	Hilary Glidewell	11,668	23.6	+4.1
Majority		5,168	10.4	−1.5
Turnout		49,448	81.5	+4.0
Conservative hold		Swing	-0.7	

General election October 1974: Nantwich
Party	Candidate	Votes	%	±%
Conservative	John Hoyle Cockcroft	20,395	43.7	+0.3
Labour	Adrian Edward Bailey	17,021	36.5	+3.5
Liberal	Hilary Glidewell	9,209	19.8	−3.8
Majority		3,374	7.2	−3.2
Turnout		46,625	76.2	−5.3
Conservative hold		Swing	-1.6	

General election 1979: Nantwich
Party	Candidate	Votes	%	±%
Conservative	Nicholas Cosmo Bonsor	25,624	50.3	+6.6
Labour	Deric Shaw	17,919	35.2	−1.3
Liberal	C. Walsh	6,571	12.9	−6.9
National Front	John Edgar Lindsey Green	814	1.6	New
Majority		7,705	15.1	+7.9
Turnout		50,928	79.3	+3.1
Conservative hold		Swing	+4.0	

== See also ==
- History of parliamentary constituencies and boundaries in Cheshire
