= Angela Watkinson =

British politician (born 1941)

Dame Angela Watkinson DBE
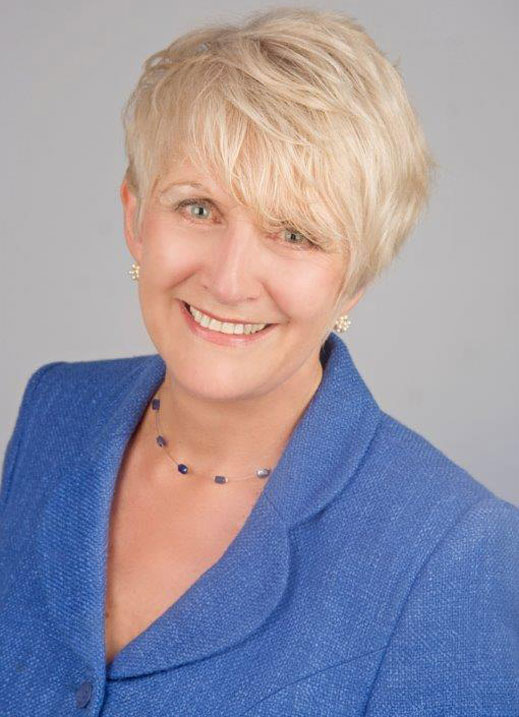

Lord Commissioner of the Treasury
- In office 11 May 2010 – 4 September 2012
- Prime Minister: David Cameron
- Preceded by: David Watts
- Succeeded by: Anne Milton

Member of Parliament for Hornchurch and Upminster Upminster (2001–2010)
- In office 7 June 2001 – 8 June 2017
- Preceded by: Keith Darvill
- Succeeded by: Julia Dockerill

Member of Essex County Council for Billericay North
- In office 1 May 1997 – 7 June 2001
- Preceded by: Lilian Greenfield
- Succeeded by: Anthony Hedley

Personal details
- Born: Angela Eileen Ellicott; 18 November 1941 (age 84) Leytonstone, Essex, England
- Party: Conservative
- Spouse: Roy Watkinson
- Website: Official website

Dame Angela Eileen Watkinson, DBE (née Ellicott; born 18 November 1941) is a British politician. She was Conservative Party Member of Parliament (MP) for Hornchurch and Upminster until 2017, and was first elected in 2001 to the earlier seat of Upminster, defeating Labour's Keith Darvill who had taken the seat from the Conservatives in 1997. She was re-elected with increased majorities in 2005 and 2010.

On 19 April 2017, Watkinson announced that she would not be standing for re-election at the 2017 general election.

== Early life ==
Born in Leytonstone, Essex, she attended Wanstead County High School (a grammar school, now Wanstead High School) on Redbridge Lane West in Wanstead. In 1989, she gained a Public Administration Higher National Certificate from Anglia Higher Education College. She worked for the Bank of New South Wales from 1958 to 1964 and became a secretary in 1976 of a Special School in Essex, which helps physically handicapped children with riding lessons.

In 1988, she became a clerk to a school governing body, then committee clerk to Barking and Dagenham London Borough Council from 1988 to 1989. From 1989 to 1994, she was a committee manager for Basildon District Council. She was a councillor for Havering London Borough Council from 1994 to 1998, and on Essex County Council (for the division of Billericay North, from 1997–2001. This was a rare example of a councillor serving simultaneously on first tier authorities in different counties.

== Parliamentary career ==
Watkinson was a member of the right-wing Conservative Monday Club, but resigned her membership in October 2001 when the newly elected Conservative leader Iain Duncan Smith suspended his party's links with the group. He declared that the club's views on race and immigration were incompatible with his plans to reform the party, and Watkinson was one of three Conservative MPs forced to leave the group. An opponent of abortion, she introduced a Private Member's Bill on 14 June 2006, which would have forced doctors offering abortion, or contraception advice to under-16s, to inform the child's parents. MPs voted by 159 to 87 to reject the bill.

At a press conference on 13 March 2007, Watkinson stated that "the whole premise of sex education was wrong". Watkinson is among a dozen or so MPs who hold the most firm record on sexual identity politics, disapproving of every piece of legislation supportive of homosexuality that has passed through the House of Commons. An exception was her vote in support of the second reading of the Marriage (Same Sex Couples) Bill on 5 February 2013.

She was appointed Dame Commander of the Order of the British Empire (DBE) in the 2013 New Year Honours for public and political service.

Watkinson has expressed opposition to the introduction of non-branded packaging for cigarettes; in a debate on this in 2014, Labour MP Diana Johnson pointed out that Watkinson had accepted hospitality and two tickets to the Chelsea Flower Show, worth £1,260, from Japan Tobacco, makers of Benson & Hedges cigarettes. She is a supporter of Israel and often spoke about that in the House of Commons.

In spite of her background as a right-wing "lifelong Eurosceptic", she supported the Remain campaign in 2016 and opposed Brexit prior to the 2016 European Union membership referendum.

On 19 April 2017, Watkinson announced that she would not be standing for re-election at the 2017 general election.

== Personal life ==
She lives in Essex and Westminster, and is a member and elder of the United Reformed Church. She is a member of the Conservative Christian Fellowship. She married Roy Watkinson, now a retired Metropolitan Police officer, in 1961 in Essex; the couple have a son and two daughters.

Parliament of the United Kingdom
Preceded by Keith Darvill	Member of Parliament for Upminster; 2001–2010	Constituency abolished
New constituency	Member of Parliament for Hornchurch and Upminster; 2010–2017	Succeeded by Julia Dockerill
