= Hornchurch (constituency) =

Parliamentary constituency in the United Kingdom, 1945–2010

Coordinates: 51.529°N 0.201°E

- Former borough constituency for the House of Commons
- Boundary of Hornchurch in Greater London for the 2005 general election
- County: Greater London

1945–2010
- Seats: One
- Created from: Romford
- Replaced by: Hornchurch and Upminster; Dagenham and Rainham
- During its existence contributed to new seat(s) of: Upminster

Hornchurch was a borough constituency represented in the House of Commons of the Parliament of the United Kingdom. It elected one Member of Parliament (MP) by the first past the post system of election. At the 2010 general election parts formed the new seats of Hornchurch and Upminster; and Dagenham and Rainham.

== Boundaries ==
Map of boundaries 1974–2005

Dates	Local authority	Maps	Wards
1945–1974	Hornchurch Urban District (before 1965); London Borough of Havering (after 1965)		Urban District of Hornchurch
1974–1983	Hornchurch Urban District (before 1965); London Borough of Havering (after 1965)		Elm Park, Hacton, Hylands, Rainham, St Andrew's, and South Hornchurch.
1983–2010	Hornchurch Urban District (before 1965); London Borough of Havering (after 1965)		Airfield, Elm Park, Hacton, Hylands, Rainham, St Andrew's, and South Hornchurch.

== History ==
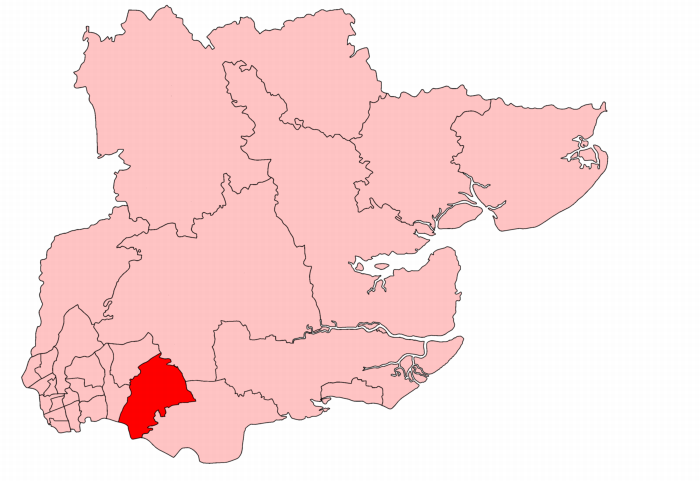
Hornchurch in Essex, showing boundaries used from 1945 to 1950.

The seat established in 1945 covered the Hornchurch Urban District, which had been enlarged in the 1930s to include the civil parishes of Cranham, Great Warley, Rainham, Upminster and Wennington in addition to the parish of Hornchurch, which included the neighbourhoods of Ardleigh Green, Elm Park, Emerson Park, South Hornchurch and Harold Wood. The population of the urban district in 1939 was 81,486. The most populous Hornchurch North West ward was very near to the town of Romford. The area became part of the London Borough of Havering in Greater London in 1965.

In 1974 the seat was redrawn, transferring Cranham, Emerson Park, Great Warley, Harold Wood and Upminster to the new Upminster constituency. The constituency shared boundaries with the Hornchurch electoral division for election of councillors to the Greater London Council at elections in 1973, 1977 and 1981. The electoral wards in Havering were redrawn in 1978, with the constituency defined in reference to the new wards from 1983. The new Airfield ward reflected the building of the Airfield Estate housing development on land that had been RAF Hornchurch.

The constituency was abolished for the 2010 election. The areas of the constituency covered by the Elm Park, South Hornchurch, and Rainham and Wennington wards in the London Borough of Havering were merged with Dagenham to form a cross-borough Dagenham and Rainham constituency. Hacton and St Andrews wards in Hornchurch merged with Upminster to form Hornchurch and Upminster. Hylands ward in Hornchurch merged with Romford. Prior to the change in boundaries the new seats were predicted to be marginal Labour and safe Conservative respectively if they followed the voting patterns of the previous Dagenham, Upminster and Romford constituencies.

== Constituency profile ==
The south of the constituency was the industrialised Hornchurch Marshes, which included the eastern part of the Ford Dagenham plant. The adjacent Rainham Marshes had been seen as a site for building large entertainment centres and was viewed as a potential site for the European Disneyland project, although it was considered much less suitable than the current position near Paris. There had been plans to build a casino but permission was not granted.

Hornchurch is a predominantly suburban and residential area. The constituency was a marginal seat due to Rainham and Elm Park's working class voters and because the wealthiest Emerson Park area of Hornchurch did not form part of the constituency after 1974.

== Members of Parliament ==
The Conservative Robin Squire was elected to Parliament as the member for Hornchurch on 3 May 1979, in one of the most surprising results of that election. Labour-held Hornchurch had not been a marginal seat and Squire had not expected to win it. However, he gained the seat from Alan Lee Williams with a majority of just 769 on a "freak" swing of 8.5% to his party. During the Thatcher years (1979 to 1990) Squire was considered to be a prominent "wet", opposed to the Conservative government's economic and employment policies. After Mrs Thatcher left office in 1990, Squire's political position strengthened and he held junior ministerial posts until the fall of the Major government in 1997. Squire was defending a majority of 9,165 – his personal popularity plus his prominence as a Minister led him to believe that he would hold the seat, but he lost to Labour's John Cryer with a 16% swing and a Labour majority of 5,680. Squire stood against Cryer again in the 2001 general election but was again defeated by a significant majority.

Election	Member	Party	Notes
1945	Geoffrey Bing	Labour	
1955	Godfrey Lagden	Conservative	
1966	Alan Lee Williams	Labour	
1970	John Loveridge	Conservative	Contested Upminster following redistribution
Feb 1974	Alan Lee Williams	Labour	
1979	Robin Squire	Conservative	
1997	John Cryer	Labour	
2005	James Brokenshire	Conservative	Contested Old Bexley and Sidcup following redistribution
2010	constituency abolished: see Hornchurch and Upminster, Dagenham and Rainham & Romford		

== Elections ==
=== Elections in the 1940s ===
General election 1945: Hornchurch
Party	Candidate	Votes	%
Labour	Geoffrey Bing	26,856	56.0
Conservative	John de Horne Vaizey	15,100	31.5
Liberal	Norman Jones	5,807	12.1
Independent	Violet Van der Elst	232	0.5
Majority		11,756	24.5
Turnout		47,995	72.3
Registered electors		66,421	
Labour win (new seat)			

=== Elections in the 1950s ===
General election 1950: Hornchurch
Party	Candidate	Votes	%	±%
Labour	Geoffrey Bing	28,463	46.1	−9.9
Conservative	James Wentworth−Day	26,696	43.2	+11.7
Liberal	Nancy Seear	6,653	10.8	−1.3
Majority		1,767	2.9	−21.6
Turnout		61,812	85.7	+13.4
Registered electors		72,146		
Labour hold		Swing	−10.8	

General election 1951: Hornchurch
Party	Candidate	Votes	%	±%
Labour	Geoffrey Bing	30,101	47.1	+1.1
Conservative	James Wentworth−Day	28,976	45.4	+2.2
Liberal	Nancy Seear	4,771	7.5	−3.3
Majority		1,125	1.8	–1.1
Turnout		63,848	86.7	+1.0
Registered electors		73,680		
Labour hold		Swing	−0.5	

General election 1955: Hornchurch
Party	Candidate	Votes	%	±%
Conservative	Godfrey Lagden	29,205	46.2	+0.9
Labour	Geoffrey Bing	27,833	44.1	−3.1
Liberal	Donald Paterson	6,117	9.7	+2.2
Majority		1,372	2.2	N/A
Turnout		63,155	82.0	−4.7
Registered electors		77,041		
Conservative gain from Labour		Swing	+2.0	

General election 1959: Hornchurch
Party	Candidate	Votes	%	±%
Conservative	Godfrey Lagden	34,852	47.5	+1.2
Labour	Jo Richardson	27,530	37.5	−6.6
Liberal	Lyndon Jones	11,056	15.1	+5.4
Majority		7,322	10.0	+7.8
Turnout		73,438	83.9	+1.9
Registered electors		87,544		
Conservative hold		Swing	+3.9	

=== Elections in the 1960s ===
General election 1964: Hornchurch
Party	Candidate	Votes	%	±%
Conservative	Godfrey Lagden	30,933	41.6	−5.9
Labour	Trevor Williams	30,699	41.3	+3.8
Liberal	Ralph Taylor	12,725	17.1	+2.1
Majority		234	0.3	–9.7
Turnout		74,357	81.9	−2.0
Registered electors		90,828		
Conservative hold		Swing	−4.8	

General election 1966: Hornchurch
Party	Candidate	Votes	%	±%
Labour	Alan Lee Williams	38,406	52.1	+10.8
Conservative	Godfrey Lagden	35,373	47.9	+6.3
Majority		3,033	4.1	N/A
Turnout		73,779	81.1	−0.8
Registered electors		90,969		
Labour gain from Conservative		Swing	+2.2	

=== Elections in the 1970s ===
General election 1970: Hornchurch
Party	Candidate	Votes	%	±%
Conservative	John Loveridge	36,124	49.7	+1.8
Labour	Alan Lee Williams	30,294	41.7	−10.4
Liberal	Bryan Sell	6,227	8.6	New
Majority		5,830	8.0	N/A
Turnout		72,645	72.8	−8.3
Registered electors		99,800		
Conservative gain from Labour		Swing	+6.1	

1970 notional result
Party	Vote	%
Labour	21,100	48.8
Conservative	18,400	42.6
Liberal	3,700	8.6
Turnout	43,200	72.6
Electorate	59,506	

General election February 1974: Hornchurch
Party	Candidate	Votes	%	±%
Labour	Alan Lee Williams	21,763	45.0	−3.8
Conservative	J. Jackson	15,567	32.2	−10.4
Liberal	Brian McCarthy	10,391	21.5	+12.9
PEOPLE	B. Percy−Davis	619	1.3	New
Majority		6,196	12.8	+6.6
Turnout		48,340	80.7	+8.1
Registered electors		59,866		
Labour hold		Swing	+3.3	

General election October 1974: Hornchurch
Party	Candidate	Votes	%	±%
Labour	Alan Lee Williams	21,336	48.5	+3.5
Conservative	Robin Squire	14,535	33.1	+0.9
Liberal	Brian McCarthy	7,284	16.6	−4.9
PEOPLE	B. Percy−Davis	797	1.8	+0.5
Majority		6,801	15.5	+2.7
Turnout		43,952	72.7	−8.0
Registered electors		60,423		
Labour hold		Swing	+1.3	

General election 1979: Hornchurch
Party	Candidate	Votes	%	±%
Conservative	Robin Squire	21,340	44.9	+11.8
Labour	Alan Lee Williams	20,571	43.3	−5.3
Liberal	Christopher Lewcock	4,657	9.8	−6.8
National Front	Audrey Harris	994	2.1	New
Majority		769	1.6	N/A
Turnout		47,562	78.1	+5.4
Registered electors		60,865		
Conservative gain from Labour		Swing	+8.5	

=== Elections in the 1980s ===
General election 1983: Hornchurch
Party	Candidate	Votes	%	±%
Conservative	Robin Squire	21,393	47.0	+2.2
Labour	Alan Williams	12,209	26.9	−16.4
SDP	John Martin	11,251	24.7	+15.0
National Front	A.M. Joyce	402	0.9	–1.2
Ecology	Michael Crowson	219	0.5	New
Majority		9,184	20.2	+18.6
Turnout		45,474	73.7	−4.5
Registered electors		61,741		
Conservative hold		Swing	+9.3	

General election 1987: Hornchurch
Party	Candidate	Votes	%	±%
Conservative	Robin Squire	24,039	51.2	+4.1
Labour	Alan Williams	13,345	28.4	+1.5
Liberal	Mark Long	9,609	20.4	−4.3
Majority		10,694	22.8	+2.6
Turnout		44,712	75.3	+1.7
Registered electors		62,397		
Conservative hold		Swing	+1.3	

=== Elections in the 1990s ===
General election 1992: Hornchurch
Party	Candidate	Votes	%	±%
Conservative	Robin Squire	25,817	53.5	+2.3
Labour	Leonie Cooper	16,652	34.5	+6.1
Liberal Democrats	Barry J. Oddy	5,366	11.1	–9.3
Ind. Social Democrat	Terrence F. Matthews	453	0.9	New
Majority		9,165	19.0	–3.8
Turnout		48,288	79.8	+4.5
Registered electors		60,522		
Conservative hold		Swing	–1.9	

General election 1997: Hornchurch
Party	Candidate	Votes	%	±%
Labour	John Cryer	22,066	50.2	+15.7
Conservative	Robin Squire	16,386	37.3	–16.2
Liberal Democrats	Rabi Martins	3,446	7.8	–3.3
Referendum	Rory E.B. Khilkoff-Bouldi	1,595	3.6	New
Independent	Jenny Trueman	259	0.6	New
ProLife Alliance	Joseph Sowerby	189	0.4	New
Majority		5,680	12.9	N/A
Turnout		43,941	72.8	–7.0
Registered electors		60,392		
Labour gain from Conservative		Swing	+16.0	

=== Elections in the 2000s ===
General election 2001: Hornchurch
Party	Candidate	Votes	%	±%
Labour	John Cryer	16,514	46.4	–3.8
Conservative	Robin Squire	15,032	42.3	+5.0
Liberal Democrats	Sarah E. Lea	2,928	8.2	+0.4
UKIP	Lawrence Webb	893	2.5	New
National Liberal	David Durant	190	0.5	New
Majority		1,482	4.2	–8.8
Turnout		35,557	58.3	–14.5
Registered electors		61,008		
Labour hold		Swing	–4.4	

General election 2005: Hornchurch
Party	Candidate	Votes	%	±%
Conservative	James Brokenshire	16,355	42.8	+0.6
Labour	John Cryer	15,875	41.6	–4.9
Liberal Democrats	Nathaniel Green	2,894	7.6	–0.7
BNP	Ian Moore	1,313	3.4	New
UKIP	Laurence Webb	1,033	2.7	+0.2
Residents	Malvin P. Brown	395	1.0	New
National Liberal	Graham K. Williamson	304	0.8	+0.3
Majority		480	1.3	N/A
Turnout		38,169	63.9	+5.6
Registered electors		59,773		
Conservative gain from Labour		Swing	+2.7	

== See also ==
- List of parliamentary constituencies in London
