= Upminster (constituency) =

UK Parliament constituency (1974–2010)

Coordinates: 51.573°N 0.264°E

- Former borough constituency for the House of Commons
- Boundary of Upminster in Greater London for the 2005 general election
- County: Greater London

February 1974–2010
- Seats: One
- Created from: Hornchurch
- Replaced by: Hornchurch and Upminster

Upminster was a constituency of the House of Commons in east London, which returned one Member of Parliament (MP) to the House of Commons of the Parliament of the United Kingdom, elected by the first-past-the-post voting system. It was created for the 1974 general election, and abolished for the 2010 general election.

== Boundaries ==
1974–1983: The London Borough of Havering wards of Cranham, Emerson Park, Gooshays, Harold Wood, Heaton, Hilldene, and Upminster.

1983–1997: The London Borough of Havering wards of Ardleigh Green, Cranham East, Cranham West, Emerson Park, Gooshays, Harold Wood, Heaton, Hilldene, and Upminster.

1997–2010: The London Borough of Havering wards of Cranham East, Cranham West, Emerson Park, Gooshays, Harold Wood, Heaton, Hilldene, and Upminster.

== History ==
The constituency shared boundaries with the Upminster electoral division for election of councillors to the Greater London Council at elections in 1973, 1977 and 1981.

This usually safe Conservative seat was won by Labour in the landslide of 1997. It became one of the few seats that Labour lost in the 2001 general election. The constituency was replaced by the new Hornchurch and Upminster constituency for the 2010 general election.

== Constituency profile ==
Upminster was the easternmost constituency of the London Borough of Havering, and of Greater London. The constituency was oddly shaped and covered both the wealthiest and the poorest parts of the borough while being London's least ethnically diverse constituency. The constituency included the Upminster suburb of Cranham. The boundary to the north extended beyond the A127 and A12 to include Harold Wood and Harold Hill. In the east the constituency was uniquely the only London constituency to form a protrusion to cross the M25 motorway and include North Ockendon. To the west the boundary also formed a protrusion to include the wealthy suburban area of Emerson Park which otherwise formed part of Hornchurch. The River Ingrebourne formed part of the constituency boundary to the west and the M25 Motorway formed much of the boundary to the east.

== Members of Parliament ==
Election	Member	Party
Feb 1974	John Loveridge	Conservative
1983	Sir Nicholas Bonsor	Conservative
1997	Keith Darvill	Labour
2001	Angela Watkinson	Conservative
2010	constituency abolished: see Hornchurch and Upminster	

== Elections ==
=== Elections in the 1970s ===
1970 notional result
Party	Vote	%
Conservative	20,700	45.7
Labour	20,700	45.7
Liberal	3,900	8.6
Turnout	45,300	70.3
Electorate	64,470	

General election February 1974: Upminster
Party	Candidate	Votes	%	±%
Conservative	John Loveridge	21,003	39.9	–5.8
Labour	John Whysall	19,995	38.0	–7.7
Liberal	Andrew Merton	11,596	22.0	+13.4
Majority		1,008	1.9	+1.9
Turnout		52,594	82.6	+12.3
Registered electors		63,686		
Conservative win (new seat)				

General election October 1974: Upminster
Party	Candidate	Votes	%	±%
Conservative	John Loveridge	20,966	42.7	+2.8
Labour	John Whysall	20,272	41.3	+3.3
Liberal	Andrew Merton	7,844	16.0	–6.1
Majority		694	1.4	–0.5
Turnout		49,082	76.2	–6.4
Registered electors		64,429		
Conservative hold		Swing	–0.3	

General election 1979: Upminster
Party	Candidate	Votes	%	±%
Conservative	John Loveridge	27,960	52.7	+10.0
Labour	John Kent Stephenson	18,895	35.6	–5.7
Liberal	David Harvey	5,216	9.8	–6.1
National Front	William Neary	965	1.8	New
Majority		9,065	17.1	+15.7
Turnout		53,036	80.4	+4.2
Registered electors		65,966		
Conservative hold		Swing	+7.8	

=== Elections in the 1980s ===
General election 1983: Upminster
Party	Candidate	Votes	%	±%
Conservative	Nicholas Bonsor	25,153	52.5	–0.2
SDP	David Osman	12,339	25.8	+15.9
Labour	Alan Hughes	9,829	20.5	–15.1
National Front	G Nobes-Pride	566	1.2	–0.6
Majority		12,814	26.8	+9.7
Turnout		47,887	72.1	–8.3
Registered electors		66,445		
Conservative hold		Swing	–8.1	

General election 1987: Upminster
Party	Candidate	Votes	%	±%
Conservative	Nicholas Bonsor	27,946	55.8	+3.3
SDP	John Martin	11,089	22.1	−3.6
Labour	Denis O'Flynn	11,069	22.1	+1.6
Majority		16,857	33.6	+6.9
Turnout		50,104	75.2	+3.1
Registered electors		66,613		
Conservative hold		Swing	+3.4	

=== Elections in the 1990s ===
General election 1992: Upminster
Party	Candidate	Votes	%	±%
Conservative	Nicholas Bonsor	28,791	55.8	+0.0
Labour	Terry Ward	14,970	29.0	+6.9
Liberal Democrats	Terry E. Hurlstone	7,848	15.2	–6.9
Majority		13,821	26.8	–6.9
Turnout		51,609	80.5	+5.2
Registered electors		64,138		
Conservative hold		Swing	–3.5	

1992 notional result
Party	Vote	%
Conservative	25,121	54.2
Labour	13,964	30.1
Liberal Democrats	7,300	15.7
Turnout	46,385	79.2
Electorate	58,553	

General election 1997: Upminster
Party	Candidate	Votes	%	±%
Labour	Keith Darvill	19,095	46.2	+16.1
Conservative	Nicholas Bonsor	16,315	39.5	−14.7
Liberal Democrats	Pamela G. Peskett	3,919	9.5	−6.3
Referendum	Terry Murray	2,000	4.8	New
Majority		2,770	6.7	N/A
Turnout		41,319	72.3	–6.9
Registered electors		57,149		
Labour gain from Conservative		Swing	+15.4	

=== Elections in the 2000s ===
General election 2001: Upminster
Party	Candidate	Votes	%	±%
Conservative	Angela Watkinson	15,410	45.5	+6.0
Labour	Keith Darvill	14,169	41.9	−4.3
Liberal Democrats	Peter Truesdale	3,183	9.4	−0.1
UKIP	Terry Murray	1,089	3.2	New
Majority		1,241	3.6	N/A
Turnout		33,851	59.6	−12.7
Registered electors		56,829		
Conservative gain from Labour		Swing	+5.2	

General election 2005: Upminster
Party	Candidate	Votes	%	±%
Conservative	Angela Watkinson	16,820	48.5	+3.0
Labour	Keith Darvill	10,778	31.1	−10.8
Liberal Democrats	Peter Truesdale	3,128	9.0	−0.4
Residents	Ron F.C. Ower	1,455	4.2	New
BNP	Chris Roberts	1,173	3.4	New
UKIP	Alan G. Hindle	701	2.0	−1.2
Green	Melanie J. Collins	543	1.6	New
National Liberal	David W. Durant	78	0.2	New
Majority		6,042	17.4	+14.8
Turnout		34,676	63.0	+3.4
Registered electors		55,075		
Conservative hold		Swing	+6.9	

== See also ==
- List of parliamentary constituencies in London
