= Oxford & County Secretarial College =

Secretarial School for Women at Oxford University

The Oxford and County Secretarial College (the "Ox and Cow") was a prestigious secretarial school for young women centrally located in the university city of Oxford. Founded in 1936 by the Hall family (Ernest and Irene Hall), it moved to its well-known central location at 34 St. Giles in 1952, where it was based until 1999. The college, run in the latter years by Peter Hall, accepted UK and international students with a minimum of 5 good GCE 'O' levels and most lived in college-owned shared houses in North Oxford. Courses were typically for twelve months, resulting in a Diploma. The college had strong links with top office recruitment agencies in London.

Two notable alumni were the flamboyant fashion designer Isabella Blow and veteran Hong Kong actress Teresa Mo.

The college was later known as The Oxford and County Business College, expanded its course offerings and became co-educational. It merged into the Oxford Media & Business School in 1999.
