= Hornchurch and Upminster =

UK Parliament constituency (since 2010)

Coordinates: 51.58°N 0.22°E

- Borough constituency for the House of Commons
- Interactive map of boundaries from 2024
- Location within Greater London
- County: Greater London
- Electorate: 76,938 (March 2020)

Current constituency
- Created: 2010
- Member of Parliament: Julia Lopez (Conservative)
- Seats: One
- Created from: Hornchurch, Upminster, Romford

Hornchurch and Upminster is a constituency (Note: A borough constituency (for the purposes of election expenses and type of returning officer)) in Greater London most recently represented in the House of Commons of the UK Parliament (Note: As with all constituencies, the constituency elects one Member of Parliament (MP) by the first past the post system of election at least every five years.) by Julia Lopez, a member of the Conservative Party, who succeeded Angela Watkinson in 2017. Watkinson had been elected in 2010 as the constituency's first MP.

A revision of the boundary in 2024 transferred part of Elm Park (including the London Underground station) to Dagenham and Rainham and a small area between Brentwood Road and The Ravensbourne to Romford.

== Boundaries ==
The constituency is composed of the London Borough of Havering wards of Cranham, Emerson Park, Gooshays, Hacton, Harold Wood, Heaton, St Andrew's and Upminster.

Further to the 2023 review of Westminster constituencies, which was based on the ward boundaries in place on 1 December 2020, the composition of the constituency from the 2024 general election was reduced slightly to bring it within the permitted electoral range. Parts of the Emerson Park ward, primarily that part of polling district EM2 to the west of the River Ravensbourne, were transferred to Romford; and parts of the St Andrew's and Hacton wards, mainly to the west of Abbs Cross Lane and South End Road, were transferred to Dagenham and Rainham. These minor changes largely reflected the revised ward boundaries following a local government boundary review which came into effect in May 2022.

== History ==
The seat was the proposal of the Boundary Commission's fifth periodic review of Westminster constituencies in 2008–9 and was after consultation accepted by Parliament. Hornchurch and Upminster is essentially an expansion of the old Upminster seat to include a chunk of the old Hornchurch seat, specifically Hornchurch itself. Most of the western wards of Hornchurch went to the new Dagenham and Rainham seat.

== Constituency profile ==
The easternmost seat in Greater London, it includes the suburbs of Cranham, Emerson Park, Harold Wood, Hornchurch, Upminster and part of Elm Park. The constituency includes the semi-rural Noak Hill and North Ockendon and the large Harold Hill estate, built by the London County Council and completed in 1958.

There are London Underground stations at Hornchurch, Upminster and Upminster Bridge. Harold Wood is served by a station on the Elizabeth line and there is a London Overground station at Emerson Park. Upminster is an interchange station with National Rail services on the Fenchurch Street line as well as London Underground and London Overground services.

Pockets of deprivation exist in the north of the constituency. Most output areas have high levels of retired constituents by Greater London standards, and the borough as a whole is similar to the London Borough of Bromley in that it has high levels of home ownership, on statistics compiled in the 2011 UK Census. The seat, like Havering, is the only one in London that extends beyond the M25 motorway.

The predecessor seats were lost by the Conservatives in Labour's landslide 1997 victory, but Upminster was one of the few Conservative gains in 2001 and Hornchurch was lost by Labour in 2005; this area was very safe territory for the Conservatives since it gained their strongest areas from Hornchurch in the boundary changes. The 2015 result made the seat the 146th safest of the Conservative Party's 331 seats by percentage of majority. At the 2015 general election, the constituency was one of five in Greater London where the UK Independence Party came in second place.

The constituency is unusual in that for local elections to Havering Council, the Havering Residents Association dominates the results rather than the Conservative Party who have held the seat since it was created.

== Members of Parliament ==
Election	Member	Party
2010	Dame Angela Watkinson	Conservative
2017	Julia Lopez	Conservative

== Election results ==
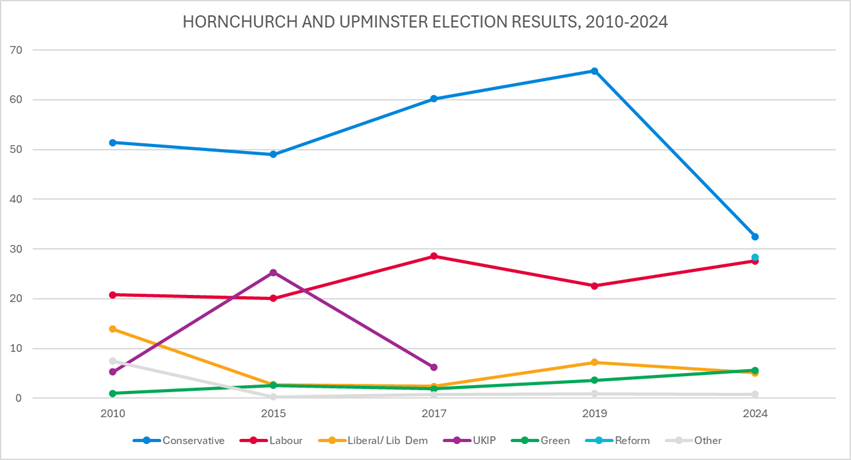
Election results 2010–2024

=== Elections in the 2020s ===
General election 2024: Hornchurch and Upminster
Party	Candidate	Votes	%	±%
Conservative	Julia Lopez	15,260	32.5	−32.9
Reform	Nicholas Palmer	13,317	28.4	N/A
Labour	Sunny Brar	12,939	27.6	+4.7
Green	Melanie Collins	2,620	5.6	+2.0
Liberal Democrats	Ian Sanderson	2,381	5.1	−2.0
Independent	David Durant	394	0.8	N/A
Majority		1,943	4.1	−39.1
Turnout		46,911	62.2	−4.2
Registered electors		75,438		
Conservative hold		Swing		

=== Elections in the 2010s ===
2019 notional result
Party	Vote	%
Conservative	33,404	65.4
Labour	11,669	22.9
Liberal Democrats	3,634	7.1
Green	1,836	3.6
Others	510	1.0
Turnout	51,053	66.4
Electorate	76,938	

General election 2019: Hornchurch and Upminster
Party	Candidate	Votes	%	±%
Conservative	Julia Lopez	35,495	65.8	+5.6
Labour	Tele Lawal	12,187	22.6	−6.0
Liberal Democrats	Thomas Clarke	3,862	7.2	+4.8
Green	Peter Caton	1,920	3.6	+1.7
BNP	David Furness	510	0.9	+0.2
Majority		23,308	43.2	+11.6
Turnout		53,974	66.8	−2.6
Registered electors		80,765		
Conservative hold		Swing	+5.8	

General election 2017: Hornchurch and Upminster
Party	Candidate	Votes	%	±%
Conservative	Julia Dockerill	33,750	60.2	+11.2
Labour	Rocky Gill	16,027	28.6	+8.5
UKIP	Lawrence Webb	3,502	6.2	−19.1
Liberal Democrats	Jonathan Mitchell	1,371	2.4	−0.3
Green	Peter Caton	1,077	1.9	−0.7
BNP	David Furness	380	0.7	+0.4
Majority		17,723	31.6	+7.9
Turnout		56,107	69.4	−0.2
Registered electors		80,802		
Conservative hold		Swing	+1.36	

General election 2015: Hornchurch & Upminster
Party	Candidate	Votes	%	±%
Conservative	Angela Watkinson	27,051	49.0	−2.4
UKIP	Lawrence Webb	13,977	25.3	+20.0
Labour	Paul McGeary	11,103	20.1	−0.7
Liberal Democrats	Jonathan Mitchell	1,501	2.7	−11.2
Green	Melanie Collins	1,411	2.6	+1.6
BNP	Paul Borg	193	0.3	−6.1
Majority		13,074	23.7	−6.9
Turnout		55,236	69.6	+1.6
Registered electors		79,331		
Conservative hold		Swing	−8.7	

General election 2010: Hornchurch & Upminster
Party	Candidate	Votes	%	±%
Conservative	Angela Watkinson*	27,469	51.4	+4.0
Labour	Kath McGuirk	11,098	20.8	−12.4
Liberal Democrats	Karen Chilvers	7,426	13.9	+5.1
BNP	William Whelpley	3,421	6.4	
UKIP	Lawrence Webb	2,848	5.3	
Green	Melanie Collins	542	1.0	
Independent	David Durant	305	0.6	
Christian	Johnson Olukotun	281	0.5	
Majority		16,371	30.7	+16.4
Turnout		53,390	68.0	+4.8
Registered electors		78,547		
Conservative hold		Swing	+8.2	

* Served as MP for Upminster in the 2005–2010 Parliament

2005 notional result
Party	Vote	%
Conservative	23,127	47.4
Labour	16,167	33.2
Liberal Democrats	4,290	8.8
Residents	1,455	3.0
Others	3,715	7.6
Turnout	48,754	63.2
Electorate	77,165	
