= 1997 Essex County Council election =

1997 UK local government election

← 1993	1 May 1997	2001 →

79 out of 98 seats to Essex County Council 50 seats needed for a majority
- Registered: 994,948
- Turnout: 72.6% (▲36.6%)

	First party	Second party	Third party
Leader	Paul White	Christopher Pearson (defeated)	Richard Boyd
Party	Conservative	Labour	Liberal Democrats
Leader since	20 January 1994	May 1996
Leader's seat	Stock	Tendring Rural West; Contested Maypole (Defeated)	Rayleigh North
Last election	32 seats, 35.3%	33 seats, 30.7%	32 seats, 31.9%
Seats before	26	25	27
Seats won	40	23	15
Seats after	45	32	20
Seat change	▲13	▼1	▼12
Popular vote	281,074	229,181	192,520
Percentage	38.9%	31.7%	26.6%
Swing	▲3.1%	▲1.3%	▼5.3%
	Fourth party
Party	Loughton Residents
Last election	did not stand
Seats before	0
Seats won	1
Seats after	1
Seat change	▲1
Popular vote	5,040
Percentage	0.7%
Swing	▲0.7%
- Results of the 1997 Essex County Council election.
Leader before election
Christopher Pearson
Labour
No overall control
Leader after election
Mervyn Juliff
Labour
No overall control

The 1997 Essex County Council election took place on 1 May 1997 to elect members of Essex County Council in Essex, England. This was held on the same day as other local elections and the 1997 general election.

79 councillors were elected from various electoral divisions, which returned either one or two county councillors each by first-past-the-post voting for a four-year term of office.

Due to the impending creation of the Southend-on-Sea Borough Council and Thurrock Council unitary authorities, the divisions covering these areas were not contested at this election and would ultimately be abolished in 1998. This would reduce the number of seats on Essex County Council by 19 to 79 seats. In 1993, the breakdown of the abolished seats were 9 Labour, 5 Conservative and 5 Liberal Democrats.

== Previous composition ==
=== 1993 election ===
Party	Seats
Labour	33
Conservative	32
Liberal Democrats	32
Independent	1
Total	79

=== Composition of council seats before election ===
Party	Seats
Labour	34
Liberal Democrats	32
Conservative	31
Independent	1
Total	79

== Summary ==
=== Election result ===
Results below exclude the 19 councillors from Southend and Thurrock whose divisions were not contested at this election and were ultimately abolished in 1998.

1997 Essex County Council election
Party	Candidates	Seats	Gains	Losses	Net gain/loss	Seats %	Votes %	Votes	+/−
Conservative	79	40	14	1	▲13	50.6	38.9	281,074	+3.6
Labour	79	23	2	3	▼1	29.1	31.7	229,181	+1.0
Liberal Democrats	78	15	1	13	▼12	19.0	26.6	192,520	–5.3
Loughton Residents	2	1	1	0	▲1	1.3	0.7	5,040	N/A
Green	23	0	0	0	Steady	0.0	1.1	7,907	+0.1
Independent	6	0	0	1	▼1	0.0	1.0	7,378	+0.2
Socialist Alliance (England)	2	0	0	0	Steady	0.0	<0.1	220	N/A

=== Election of Group Leaders ===
Paul White (Stock) was elected leader of the Conservative Group, Mervyn Juliff (Great Parndon) was elected leader of the Labour Group and Kenneth Jones (Park) was elected leader of the Liberal Democratic Group.

== Government Formation ==
Despite winning less than half the seats contested, the incumbent Labour-Liberal Democrat coalition continued in government because the members from Southend and Thurrock (whose seats had not been contested at the election) gave them a 52 to 45 majority over the Conservatives until April 1998 when those seats would be abolished.

After council leader Chris Pearson (Tendring Rural West), wasn't reelected in Maypole, Mervyn Juliff (Great Parndon) became council leader until the departure of the 19 Southend and Thurrock councilors, at which point Conservative group leader Paul White became leader.

However in May 1999 Alison Enkel (Brentwood Rural) resigned from the Conservatives. This following a by election loss to Labour a year before gave control of the council back to the Labour-Liberal Democrat coalition.

This proved unworkable as with further resignations leading to a power struggle before defeat in budget vote which caused the coalition to resign and the Conservatives to return.

== Division results by local authority ==
=== Basildon ===
Basildon District Summary
Party	Seats	+/-	Votes	%	+/-
Labour	5	Steady	35,336	39.9	–1.3
Conservative	5	▲1	33,144	37.4	+0.2
Liberal Democrats	0	▼1	20,021	22.6	+1.5
Socialist Alliance	0	Steady	120	0.1	N/A
Total	10	Steady	88,621	70.7	+32.9

Division results

Basildon Crouch
Party	Candidate	Votes	%	±%
Conservative	Donald Morris	3,586	44.0	+4.5
Liberal Democrats	Geoffrey Williams*	2,520	30.9	−13.2
Labour	Liv Roe	2,052	25.2	+8.7
Majority		1,066	13.1	
Turnout		8,158	73.3	+32.5
Conservative gain from Liberal Democrats		Swing	▲8.9	

Basildon Fryerns
Party	Candidate	Votes	%	±%
Labour	William Archibald*	4,427	66.4	−1.6
Conservative	Sandra Elliott	1,610	24.1	+1.6
Liberal Democrats	Terry Marsh	631	9.5	±0.0
Majority		2,817	42.2	+3.3
Turnout		6,668	68.6	+29.5
Labour hold		Swing	▼1.6	

Basildon Gloucester Park
Party	Candidate	Votes	%	±%
Labour	Anthony Wright	4,935	61.0	−4.3
Conservative	Andrew Elliott	2,105	26.0	+0.3
Liberal Democrats	Michael Dickinson	1,056	13.0	+4.0
Majority		2,830	35.0	−4.6
Turnout		8,096	71.9	+30.0
Labour hold		Swing	▼2.3	

Basildon Laindon
Party	Candidate	Votes	%	±%
Labour	Rachel Liebeschuetz*	3,679	56.1	−1.5
Conservative	David Walsh	1,930	29.4	−2.0
Liberal Democrats	Vivien Howard	950	14.5	+3.5
Majority		1,749	26.7	+0.5
Turnout		6,559	65.5	+29.4
Labour hold		Swing	▲0.3	

Basildon Pitsea
Party	Candidate	Votes	%	±%
Labour	Keith Bobbin	5,791	54.3	−3.2
Conservative	Jacqueline Blake	3,381	31.7	−1.4
Liberal Democrats	David Birch	1,369	12.8	+3.4
Socialist Alliance	David Murray	120	1.1	N/A
Majority		2,410	22.6	−1.8
Turnout		10,661	63.5	+29.1
Labour hold		Swing	▼0.9	

Basildon Vange
Party	Candidate	Votes	%	±%
Labour	Swatantra Nandanwar	4,668	57.2	−4.6
Conservative	Stephen Hillier	2,213	27.1	−0.9
Liberal Democrats	Mark Hersom	1,285	15.7	+5.5
Majority		2,455	30.1	−3.7
Turnout		8,166	64.6	+27.6
Labour hold		Swing	▼1.9	

Basildon Westley Heights
Party	Candidate	Votes	%	±%
Conservative	Brinley Jones*	3,958	40.8	+0.1
Labour	Susanna Caira-Neeson	3,458	35.7	−2.1
Liberal Democrats	Joseph White	2,275	23.5	+2.0
Majority		500	5.2	+2.3
Turnout		9,691	76.4	+32.7
Conservative hold		Swing	▲1.1	

Billericay North
Party	Candidate	Votes	%	±%
Conservative	Angela Watkinson	5,338	51.3	−10.5
Liberal Democrats	Ronald Dowden	3,598	34.6	+7.4
Labour	Margaret Viney	1,473	14.2	+3.2
Majority		1,740	16.7	−17.8
Turnout		10,409	75.5	+42.1
Conservative hold		Swing	▼9.0	

Billericay South
Party	Candidate	Votes	%	±%
Conservative	Kay Twitchen*	4,287	43.3	+2.8
Liberal Democrats	Geoffrey Taylor	3,694	37.3	−0.7
Labour	Geoffrey Viney	1,930	19.5	+3.4
Majority		593	6.0	+3.5
Turnout		9,911	75.7	+37.2
Conservative hold		Swing	▲1.8	

Wickford
Party	Candidate	Votes	%	±%
Conservative	Iris Pummell*	4,736	46.0	−2.6
Labour	Ian Hancock	2,923	28.4	+10.0
Liberal Democrats	Lesley Pattison	2,643	25.7	−7.3
Majority		1,813	17.6	+2.0
Turnout		10,302	72.3	+25.0
Conservative hold		Swing	▼6.3	

=== Braintree ===
District Summary
Party	Seats	+/-	Votes	%	+/-
Labour	4	Steady	26,705	37.2	–3.0
Conservative	2	Steady	26,812	37.3	+2.1
Liberal Democrats	1	Steady	15,388	21.4	–0.7
Green	0	Steady	2,909	4.1	+1.5
Total	7	Steady	71,814	74.6	+35.6

Division results

Bocking
Party	Candidate	Votes	%	±%
Labour	Frederick Card*	3,925	42.4	−1.9
Conservative	Simon Walsh	3,412	36.8	+2.0
Liberal Democrats	Anthony Meadows	1,584	17.1	−1.3
Green	Wendy Partridge	340	3.7	+1.2
Majority		513	5.5	−4.0
Turnout		9,261	70.1	+26.1
Labour hold		Swing	▼2.0	

Braintree East
Party	Candidate	Votes	%	±%
Labour	Elwyn Bishop*	4,682	40.6	−6.0
Conservative	Nigel Edey	4,553	39.5	+3.1
Liberal Democrats	Lesley Beckett	1,967	17.1	+3.1
Green	Susan Ransome	332	2.9	−0.1
Majority		129	1.1	−9.0
Turnout		11,534	79.3	+36.4
Labour hold		Swing	▼4.6	

Braintree West
Party	Candidate	Votes	%	±%
Liberal Democrats	Douglas Rice*	3,837	33.4	−11.8
Conservative	Roger Wacey	3,714	32.3	+4.6
Labour	Robert Miller	3,630	31.6	+7.2
Green	Nelson Brunton	318	2.8	±0.0
Majority		123	1.1	−16.4
Turnout		11,499	75.0	+34.6
Liberal Democrats hold		Swing	▼8.2	

Halstead
Party	Candidate	Votes	%	±%
Conservative	Joseph Pike*	4,153	40.2	+1.5
Labour	John Kotz	3,355	32.4	−5.9
Liberal Democrats	Oliver Forder	2,393	23.1	+0.1
Green	Lyn Peacock	442	4.3	N/A
Majority		798	7.7	+7.3
Turnout		10,343	73.6	+36.0
Conservative hold		Swing	▲3.7	

Hedingham
Party	Candidate	Votes	%	±%
Conservative	Geoffrey Waterer*	4,311	44.8	−1.4
Liberal Democrats	Trevor Ellis	2,529	26.3	+0.7
Labour	Edward Snarey	2,458	25.6	−2.6
Green	Kevin Peterson	319	3.3	N/A
Majority		1,782	18.5	+0.5
Turnout		9,617	77.1	+38.5
Conservative hold		Swing	▼1.1	

Witham Northern
Party	Candidate	Votes	%	±%
Labour	Joan Lyon*	4,845	47.3	−10.2
Conservative	Dennis Willetts	3,090	30.2	+5.3
Liberal Democrats	Roy Cavinder	1,503	14.7	+2.9
Green	James Abbott	802	7.8	+1.9
Majority		1,755	17.1	−15.5
Turnout		10,240	73.2	+38.7
Labour hold		Swing	▼7.8	

Witham Southern
Party	Candidate	Votes	%	±%
Labour	John Gyford*	3,810	40.9	−1.8
Conservative	Michael Lager	3,579	38.4	−0.6
Liberal Democrats	Christine May	1,575	16.9	+5.1
Green	Philip Hughes	356	3.8	−0.2
Majority		231	2.5	−1.3
Turnout		9,320	73.3	+38.3
Labour hold		Swing	▼0.6	

=== Brentwood ===
Brentwood District Summary
Party	Seats	+/-	Votes	%	+/-
Conservative	4	▲4	18,258	43.8	+7.9
Liberal Democrats	1	▼4	15,046	36.1	–15.5
Labour	0	Steady	7,965	19.1	+9.4
Green	0	Steady	400	1.0	–1.9
Total	5	Steady	41,669	74.9	+34.5

Division results

Brentwood Central
Party	Candidate	Votes	%	±%
Liberal Democrats	Edgar Davis*	2,941	42.8	−16.1
Conservative	Francis Kenny	2,532	36.9	+6.7
Labour	Martin Coule	1,393	20.3	+12.8
Majority		409	14.8	−13.9
Turnout		6,866	75.4	+33.2
Liberal Democrats hold		Swing	▼11.4	

Brentwood Hutton
Party	Candidate	Votes	%	±%
Conservative	John Roberts	4,511	48.7	+5.1
Liberal Democrats	Richard Davies	3,139	33.9	−10.0
Labour	Charles Bisson	1,611	17.4	+7.4
Majority		1,372	14.8	
Turnout		9,261	75.4	+40.5
Conservative gain from Liberal Democrats		Swing	▲7.6	

Brentwood North
Party	Candidate	Votes	%	±%
Conservative	Judith Gray	3,186	45.5	+7.3
Liberal Democrats	Norman Spencer	2,615	37.3	−15.4
Labour	Rosalind Brown	1,201	17.2	+10.1
Majority		571	8.2	
Turnout		7,002	74.7	+36.3
Conservative gain from Liberal Democrats		Swing	▲11.4	

Brentwood Rural
Party	Candidate	Votes	%	±%
Conservative	Alison Enkel	4,230	43.1	+10.5
Liberal Democrats	Derek Hardy*	3,879	39.5	−18.6
Labour	Paul Bartley	1,303	13.3	+7.0
Green	Carolyn Bartley	400	4.1	+1.1
Majority		351	3.6	
Turnout		9,812	76.8	+32.7
Conservative gain from Liberal Democrats		Swing	▲14.6	

Brentwood South
Party	Candidate	Votes	%	±%
Conservative	Lionel Lee*	3,799	43.5	+7.8
Liberal Democrats	Cyril Robins	2,472	28.3	−15.9
Labour	Deborah Richardson	2,457	28.2	+11.2
Majority		1,327	15.2	
Turnout		8,728	75.5	+33.0
Conservative gain from Liberal Democrats		Swing	▲11.9	

=== Castle Point ===
Castle Point District Summary
Party	Seats	+/-	Votes	%	+/-
Conservative	4	▲2	21,761	45.1	+11.8
Labour	2	▼1	19,413	40.3	+6.1
Liberal Democrats	0	▼1	6,957	14.4	–18.0
Socialist Alliance	0	Steady	100	0.2	N/A
Total	6	Steady	48,231	70.9	+33.2

Division results

Benfleet
Party	Candidate	Votes	%	±%
Conservative	Jillian Reeves*	3,483	48.0	+12.1
Labour	Brian Wilson	2,760	38.0	+8.7
Liberal Democrats	Stephen Howe	1,014	14.0	−20.8
Majority		723	10.0	+8.9
Turnout		7,257	73.8	+38.1
Conservative hold		Swing	▲1.7	

Canvey Island East
Party	Candidate	Votes	%	±%
Labour	Dennis Williams	4,682	48.1	+7.4
Conservative	Christopher Freeman	3,833	39.4	+5.8
Liberal Democrats	Barry Newman	1,218	12.5	−13.1
Majority		849	8.7	+1.6
Turnout		9,733	66.1	+30.6
Labour hold		Swing	▲0.8	

Canvey Island West
Party	Candidate	Votes	%	±%
Conservative	Raymond Howard*	4,778	51.5	+7.5
Labour	James David	3,725	40.2	+1.4
Liberal Democrats	Roger Terry	670	7.2	−10.0
Socialist Alliance	Robert Chapman	100	1.1	N/A
Majority		1,053	11.4	+6.2
Turnout		9,273	67.6	+31.4
Conservative hold		Swing	▲3.1	

Great Tarpots
Party	Candidate	Votes	%	±%
Labour	Alfred Goldsworthy	3,468	43.5	−2.6
Conservative	John Greenwood	3,301	41.4	+13.4
Liberal Democrats	Barry King	1,201	15.1	−10.9
Majority		167	2.1	−16.0
Turnout		7,970	73.0	+36.3
Labour hold		Swing	▼8.0	

Hadleigh
Party	Candidate	Votes	%	±%
Conservative	Ronald Williams	3,043	45.0	+16.5
Labour	Roy English	2,070	30.6	+19.6
Liberal Democrats	Michael Baker*	1,648	24.4	−36.2
Majority		973	14.4	
Turnout		6,761	74.6	+28.0
Conservative gain from Liberal Democrats		Swing	▼1.6	

Thundersley
Party	Candidate	Votes	%	±%
Conservative	William Dick*	3,323	45.9	+18.2
Labour	Guy Shearwood	2,708	37.4	+0.1
Liberal Democrats	Thomas Pile	1,206	16.7	−18.3
Majority		615	8.5	
Turnout		7,237	73.8	+35.4
Conservative gain from Labour		Swing	▲9.1	

=== Chelmsford ===
Chelmsford District Summary
Party	Seats	+/-	Votes	%	+/-
Conservative	4	▲1	35,355	39.0	+1.8
Liberal Democrats	4	▼1	31,366	34.6	–8.6
Labour	1	Steady	20,208	22.3	+3.5
Green	0	Steady	2,320	2.6	+1.8
Independent	0	Steady	1,383	1.5	N/A
Total	9	Steady	90,632	74.6	+34.4

Division results

Broomfield & Writtle
Party	Candidate	Votes	%	±%
Conservative	Wendy Cole	2,574	33.0	−5.3
Liberal Democrats	Phillip Evans*	2,417	31.0	−9.1
Labour	Barry Grainger	1,387	17.8	−1.1
Independent	Delmas Ashford	1,261	16.2	N/A
Green	Paulene Gaywood	168	2.2	−0.5
Majority		157	2.0	
Turnout		7,807	75.0	+33.5
Conservative gain from Liberal Democrats		Swing	▲1.9	

Chelmsford East
Party	Candidate	Votes	%	±%
Liberal Democrats	Ian Gale	3,727	39.6	−9.9
Conservative	John Candler	3,401	36.1	−2.2
Labour	Michael Bloomsbury	2,016	21.4	+9.2
Green	Nicholas Scales	156	1.7	N/A
Independent	Stephen Stratton	122	1.3	N/A
Majority		326	3.5	−7.8
Turnout		9,422	76.6	+31.2
Liberal Democrats hold		Swing	▼3.9	

Chelmsford North
Party	Candidate	Votes	%	±%
Liberal Democrats	Thomas Smith-Hughes*	3,429	38.2	−1.3
Conservative	Kathleen Pauley	2,716	30.3	+2.5
Labour	William Horslen	2,680	29.9	−2.9
Green	Angela Thomson	145	1.6	N/A
Majority		713	7.9	+1.2
Turnout		8,970	76.6	+25.6
Liberal Democrats hold		Swing	▼1.9	

Chelmsford South
Party	Candidate	Votes	%	±%
Liberal Democrats	George Allen*	4,000	45.4	−11.4
Conservative	Vernon Makin	2,926	33.2	+2.5
Labour	David Howell	1,674	19.0	+6.4
Green	Beryl Lankester	202	2.3	N/A
Majority		1,074	12.2	−13.9
Turnout		8,802	76.9	+32.5
Liberal Democrats hold		Swing	▼7.0	

Chelmsford West
Party	Candidate	Votes	%	±%
Labour	Neil Spurgeon*	2,573	35.5	−1.0
Liberal Democrats	John Hunnable	2,561	35.3	+5.2
Conservative	Duncan Lumley	2,120	29.2	−4.2
Majority		12	0.2	−2.9
Turnout		7,254	71.5	+21.4
Labour hold		Swing	▼3.1	

Great Baddow
Party	Candidate	Votes	%	±%
Liberal Democrats	Joan Beard*	3,761	47.6	−15.5
Conservative	Norman Hume	2,451	31.0	+6.2
Labour	Fredrick Burden	1,549	19.6	+7.5
Green	Joyce Shiner	146	1.8	N/A
Majority		1,310	16.6	−21.7
Turnout		7,907	75.3	+32.2
Liberal Democrats hold		Swing	▼10.9	

Springfield
Party	Candidate	Votes	%	±%
Conservative	Peter Martin*	6,646	43.4	+2.1
Liberal Democrats	Graham Pooley	5,256	34.3	−6.7
Labour	Roderick Essery	2,819	18.4	+4.8
Green	Eleanor Burgess	591	3.9	−0.2
Majority		1,390	9.1	+8.8
Turnout		15,312	74.6	+41.0
Conservative hold		Swing	▲4.4	

Stock
Party	Candidate	Votes	%	±%
Conservative	Paul White*	5,258	49.3	+0.5
Labour	Derek Rice	2,631	24.7	+5.2
Liberal Democrats	James Hutchon	2,404	22.5	−9.2
Green	Robert Kenney	368	3.5	N/A
Majority		2,627	24.6	+7.5
Turnout		10,661	74.9	+41.3
Conservative hold		Swing	▼2.4	

Woodham Ferrers & Danbury
Party	Candidate	Votes	%	±%
Conservative	Eileen Mickleborough*	7,263	50.1	+1.4
Liberal Democrats	Richard Phillips	3,811	26.3	−12.6
Labour	Carole Sampson	2,879	19.9	+7.5
Green	Colin Budgey	544	3.8	N/A
Majority		3,452	23.8	+14.0
Turnout		14,497	71.9	+39.8
Conservative hold		Swing	▲7.0	

=== Colchester ===
Colchester District Summary
Party	Seats	+/-	Votes	%	+/-
Liberal Democrats	5	Steady	27,697	33.7	–10.6
Conservative	3	Steady	28,144	34.2	+2.2
Labour	1	Steady	23,875	29.0	+6.7
Independent	0	Steady	2,147	2.6	N/A
Green	0	Steady	367	0.4	–1.0
Total	9	Steady	82,230	70.1	+35.2

Division results

Constable
Party	Candidate	Votes	%	±%
Conservative	Anthony Clover*	3,916	45.8	−2.3
Liberal Democrats	Andrew Phillips	2,844	33.3	−6.5
Labour	Julie Young	1,783	20.9	+8.8
Majority		1,072	12.5	+4.1
Turnout		8,543	76.8	+37.1
Conservative hold		Swing	+2.1	

Drury
Party	Candidate	Votes	%	±%
Liberal Democrats	Robert Yates*	3,945	39.8	−14.7
Conservative	Jeremy Lucas	3,865	38.9	+2.8
Labour	Roy Moules	2,115	21.3	+11.8
Majority		80	0.8	−17.5
Turnout		9,925	74.4	+29.5
Liberal Democrats hold		Swing	−8.7	

Maypole
Party	Candidate	Votes	%	±%
Liberal Democrats	Patricia Pascoe*	3,149	41.5	−14.8
Labour	Christopher Pearson*	2,654	35.0	+7.7
Conservative	Richard Lamberth	1,783	23.5	+7.1
Majority		495	6.5	−22.5
Turnout		7,586	63.9	+36.8
Liberal Democrats hold		Swing	−11.3	

Mersea and Stanway
Party	Candidate	Votes	%	±%
Conservative	Christopher Manning-Press*	5,193	44.3	+0.1
Liberal Democrats	Terence Brady	3,973	33.9	−6.5
Labour	Ian Yates	2,556	21.8	+9.2
Majority		1,220	10.4	+6.6
Turnout		11,722	74.7	+39.9
Conservative hold		Swing	+3.3	

No Green candidate as previous (−2.8).

Old Heath
Party	Candidate	Votes	%	±%
Liberal Democrats	Margaret Fisher*	3,806	43.4	−7.8
Labour	Sally Pygott	3,092	35.2	+1.0
Conservative	Ian McCord	1,879	21.4	+9.4
Majority		714	8.1	−8.8
Turnout		8,777	67.5	+29.4
Liberal Democrats hold		Swing	−4.4	

No Green candidate as previous (−2.6).

Park
Party	Candidate	Votes	%	±%
Liberal Democrats	Kenneth Jones*	3,141	36.4	−10.4
Conservative	Nigel Chapman	2,876	33.3	−1.0
Labour	Kim Naish	2,611	30.3	+11.4
Majority		265	3.1	−13.8
Turnout		8,628	66.6	+28.5
Liberal Democrats hold		Swing	−4.7	

Parsons Heath
Party	Candidate	Votes	%	±%
Liberal Democrats	Edward Crunden*	4,413	42.1	−11.1
Conservative	Derek Smith	3,062	29.2	+6.9
Labour	Anthony Constable	3,005	28.7	+4.2
Majority		1,351	12.9	−15.8
Turnout		10,480	69.3	+32.5
Liberal Democrats hold		Swing	−9.0	

Tiptree
Party	Candidate	Votes	%	±%
Conservative	Edmund Peel*	3,526	40.0	−4.0
Labour	Tania Rogers	2,783	31.5	+5.6
Independent	Stuart Beckwith	2,147	24.3	New
Green	Cheryl Gerrard	367	4.2	−0.5
Majority		743	8.5	−9.5
Turnout		8,823	73.1	+43.6
Conservative hold		Swing	−4.8	

No Liberal Democrat candidate as previous (−25.2).

Wivenhoe St Andrew
Party	Candidate	Votes	%	±%
Labour	Brian Stapleton*	3,276	42.3	−7.8
Liberal Democrats	John Gray	2,426	31.3	+14.0
Conservative	Jane Girdlestone	2,044	26.4	−2.5
Majority		850	11.0	−10.2
Turnout		7,746	63.4	+37.2
Labour hold		Swing	−10.9	

No Green candidate as previous (−3.7).

=== Epping Forest ===
Epping Forest District Summary
Party	Seats	+/-	Votes	%	+/-
Conservative	5	▲1	29,056	43.3	+2.2
Labour	1	▼1	19,769	29.4	–1.4
Liberal Democrats	1	Steady	13,296	19.8	–7.5
Loughton Residents	1	▲1	5,040	7.5	N/A
Total	8	Steady	67,161	72.1	+39.3

Division results

Buckhurst Hill
Party	Candidate	Votes	%	±%
Liberal Democrats	Stephen Robinson*	3,342	43.1	−16.7
Conservative	Richard Watts	2,850	36.7	+11.1
Labour	Alan Larner	1,571	20.2	+11.1
Majority		492	6.3	
Turnout		7,763	72.9	
Liberal Democrats hold		Swing	▼13.9	

Chigwell
Party	Candidate	Votes	%	±%
Conservative	Michael Tomkins	3,851	57.3	−1.3
Liberal Democrats	Jack Fuller	1,556	23.2	−5.6
Labour	Paul Bostock	1,309	19.5	+6.9
Majority		2,295	34.2	
Turnout		6,716	70.6	
Conservative hold		Swing	▲2.2	

Epping
Party	Candidate	Votes	%	±%
Conservative	Dennis Ramshaw*	4,042	45.8	+2.5
Liberal Democrats	Nicholas Macy	2,446	27.7	−7.0
Labour	Sidney Miller	2,340	26.5	+4.5
Majority		1,596	18.1	
Turnout		8,828	72.1	
Conservative hold		Swing	▲4.8	

Loughton St. Johns
Party	Candidate	Votes	%	±%
Labour	Gillian Huckle	2,570	37.0	−18.4
Loughton Residents	Dorothy Paddon	2,146	30.9	+30.9
Conservative	Stephen Metcalfe	1,772	25.5	−4.5
Liberal Democrats	Christopher Spence	452	6.5	−8.1
Majority		424	6.1	−19.2
Turnout		6,940	69.7	+41.6
Labour hold		Swing	▼24.7	

Loughton St. Marys
Party	Candidate	Votes	%	±%
Loughton Residents	Christopher Harper	2,894	36.9	+36.9
Labour	Stanley Goodwin*	2,552	32.5	−12.6
Conservative	James Brokenshire	1,952	24.9	−10.7
Liberal Democrats	Lucille Thompson	446	5.7	−13.6
Majority		342	4.4	
Turnout		7,844	73.6	+39.5
Loughton Residents gain from Labour		Swing	▲24.8	

North Weald & Nazeing
Party	Candidate	Votes	%	±%
Conservative	Ian Abbey*	4,645	56.6	−3.9
Labour	Graham Smith	2,292	27.9	+7.8
Liberal Democrats	Colin Bagnall	1,265	15.4	−4.0
Majority		2,443	28.7	
Turnout		8,202	74.9	
Conservative hold		Swing	▲5.9	

Ongar
Party	Candidate	Votes	%	±%
Conservative	Gerard McEwan*	4,941	47.7	+6.5
Labour	Ronald Barnes	2,887	27.9	+5.7
Liberal Democrats	Douglas Kelly	2,520	24.4	−12.1
Majority		2,054	19.8	
Turnout		10,348	75.5	
Conservative hold		Swing	▲0.4	

Waltham Abbey
Party	Candidate	Votes	%	±%
Conservative	Elizabeth Webster	5,003	47.6	+4.3
Labour	George Farren	4,248	40.4	−16.3
Liberal Democrats	Patricia Brooks	1,269	12.1	N/A
Majority		755	7.2	
Turnout		10,520	67.7	
Conservative gain from Labour		Swing	▲10.3	

=== Harlow ===
Harlow District Summary
Party	Seats	+/-	Votes	%	+/-
Labour	5	Steady	22,591	53.9	+2.0
Conservative	0	Steady	12,189	29.1	–2.0
Liberal Democrats	0	Steady	6,696	16.0	–1.0
Green	0	Steady	420	1.0	N/A
Total	5	Steady	41,896	73.9	+34.4

Division results

Great Parndon
Party	Candidate	Votes	%	±%
Labour	Mervyn Juliff*	4,631	51.5	+6.7
Conservative	Ronald Cross	3,133	34.8	−5.2
Liberal Democrats	Irene Lee	1,227	13.6	−1.6
Majority		1,498	16.7	
Turnout		8,991	72.8	
Labour hold		Swing	▲6.0	

Harlow & Mark Hall
Party	Candidate	Votes	%	±%
Labour	Paul Stzumpf*	3,969	51.3	+1.4
Conservative	Trevor McArdle	2,367	30.6	−6.3
Liberal Democrats	Gareth Higgins	1,196	15.5	+1.9
Green	Arthur Powell	203	2.3	N/A
Majority		1,602	20.7	
Turnout		7,749	74.7	
Labour hold		Swing	▲3.9	

Harlow Common
Party	Candidate	Votes	%	±%
Labour	Anthony Duncan	4,577	48.8	−3.1
Conservative	Simon Carter	2,706	28.8	+7.0
Liberal Democrats	Lorna Spenceley	1,886	20.1	−6.2
Green	Malcolm Powell	217	2.3	N/A
Majority		1,871	19.9	
Turnout		9,336	73.0	
Labour hold		Swing	▼5.1	

Little Parndon
Party	Candidate	Votes	%	±%
Labour	Edith Morris*	4,249	59.0	+5.2
Conservative	David Roberts	1,833	25.5	−3.7
Liberal Democrats	Stanley Ward	1,119	15.5	−1.5
Majority		2,416	33.6	
Turnout		7,201	73.6	
Labour hold		Swing	▲4.5	

Netteswellbury
Party	Candidate	Votes	%	±%
Labour	Paul Belfairs	5,165	60.2	−0.3
Conservative	Michael Garnett	2,150	25.0	−0.6
Liberal Democrats	Sheila Herbert	1,268	14.8	+0.5
Majority		3,015	35.1	
Turnout		8,583	75.3	
Labour hold		Swing	▲0.2	

=== Maldon ===
Maldon District Summary
Party	Seats	+/-	Votes	%	+/-
Conservative	3	Steady	13,532	42.5	–5.1
Labour	0	Steady	7,856	24.7	–1.4
Liberal Democrats	0	Steady	7,531	23.6	+12.9
Independent	0	Steady	1,597	5.0	+1.0
Green	0	Steady	1,351	4.2	–7.4
Total	3	Steady	31,867	74.0	+41.5

Division results

Maldon
Party	Candidate	Votes	%	±%
Conservative	Elizabeth Dines	3,847	36.8	−11.5
Labour	Alison Lamb	2,716	26.0	−4.6
Liberal Democrats	Graham Jones	1,992	19.0	N/A
Independent	Brian Mead	1,597	15.3	N/A
Green	Juliet Harpur	309	3.0	−6.0
Majority		1,131	10.8	
Turnout		10,461	75.0	
Conservative hold		Swing	▼3.5	

Southminster
Party	Candidate	Votes	%	±%
Conservative	Robert Boyce	5,100	46.6	−0.6
Labour	Terence Quinlan	3,307	30.2	−1.1
Liberal Democrats	Alan Weeks	2,004	18.3	N/A
Green	Michael Cole	523	4.8	−16.7
Majority		983	16.4	
Turnout		10,124	71.7	
Conservative hold		Swing	▲0.3	

Tollesbury
Party	Candidate	Votes	%	±%
Conservative	Rodney Bass	4,585	43.8	−3.4
Liberal Democrats	Patricia Mead	3,535	33.8	+3.4
Labour	Paul Rew	1,833	17.5	+0.4
Green	Jonathan King	519	5.0	−0.3
Majority		1,050	10.0	
Turnout		10,472	75.5	
Conservative hold		Swing	▼3.4	

=== Rochford ===
Rochford District Summary
Party	Seats	+/-	Votes	%	+/-
Conservative	2	▲1	18,023	40.8	+8.2
Liberal Democrats	2	▼1	13,756	31.1	–15.2
Labour	1	Steady	12,425	28.1	+7.1
Total	5	Steady	44,204	73.1	+37.3

Division results

Rayleigh North
Party	Candidate	Votes	%	±%
Liberal Democrats	Richard Boyd*	3,728	43.7	−27.2
Conservative	Terry Fawell	3,176	37.2	+15.2
Labour	David Sutton	1,625	19.1	+12.0
Majority		552	6.5	
Turnout		8,529	75.1	
Liberal Democrats hold		Swing	▼21.2	

Rayleigh South
Party	Candidate	Votes	%	±%
Liberal Democrats	James Gordon*	3,469	39.1	−22.8
Conservative	Peter Webster	3,364	37.9	+9.3
Labour	David Rossi	2,046	23.0	+13.5
Majority		105	1.2	
Turnout		8,879	73.0	
Liberal Democrats hold		Swing	▼16.1	

Rochford North
Party	Candidate	Votes	%	±%
Conservative	Tracey Chapman	3,794	39.9	+6.4
Liberal Democrats	Paula Smith*	3,265	34.3	−20.7
Labour	David Weir	2,447	25.7	+14.2
Majority		529	5.6	
Turnout		9,506	72.9	
Conservative gain from Liberal Democrats		Swing	▲13.6	

Rochford South
Party	Candidate	Votes	%	±%
Labour	Graham Fox*	3,315	42.1	−5.9
Conservative	Roy Pearson	3,248	41.2	+4.1
Liberal Democrats	Peter Stanton	1,311	16.6	+1.7
Majority		67	0.9	
Turnout		7,874	71.1	
Labour hold		Swing	▼5.0	

Rochford West
Party	Candidate	Votes	%	±%
Conservative	Elizabeth Hart*	4,441	47.2	+4.0
Labour	Christopher Morgan	2,992	31.8	−0.8
Liberal Democrats	Mary Nudd	1,983	21.1	−3.1
Majority		1,449	15.4	
Turnout		9,416	73.4	
Conservative hold		Swing	▲2.4	

=== Tendring ===
Tendring District Summary
Party	Seats	+/-	Votes	%	+/-
Conservative	4	Steady	26,250	35.7	+1.9
Labour	3	▲2	27,694	37.6	+5.2
Liberal Democrats	1	▼1	18,048	24.5	–2.1
Independent	0	▼1	1,598	2.2	–5.0
Total	8	Steady	73,590	70.5	+34.4

Division results

Brightlingsea
Party	Candidate	Votes	%	±%
Conservative	Derek Robinson	3,115	34.6	+13.3
Labour	Cornelius Olivier	2,954	32.8	−2.0
Liberal Democrats	Thomas Dale*	2,941	32.6	−11.3
Majority		161	1.8	
Turnout		9,010	73.2	
Conservative gain from Liberal Democrats		Swing	▲7.7	

Clacton East
Party	Candidate	Votes	%	±%
Conservative	Catherine Jessop*	3,960	44.1	−2.3
Labour	David Bolton	3,137	34.9	+6.4
Liberal Democrats	Derek Harper	1,886	21.9	−4.1
Majority		823	9.2	
Turnout		8,983	69.5	
Conservative hold		Swing	▼4.4	

Clacton North
Party	Candidate	Votes	%	±%
Labour	Clive Baker	3,606	36.8	+11.0
Liberal Democrats	Michael Bargent*	3,223	32.9	−16.3
Conservative	Audrey Owens	2,961	30.2	+5.3
Majority		383	3.9	
Turnout		9,790	67.2	
Labour gain from Liberal Democrats		Swing	▲13.7	

Clacton West
Party	Candidate	Votes	%	±%
Labour	Roy Smith*	5,008	54.8	−10.2
Conservative	Martyn Hughes	2,756	30.2	+5.5
Liberal Democrats	Peter Miller	1,375	15.0	+4.7
Majority		2,252	24.6	
Turnout		9,139	64.2	
Labour hold		Swing	▼7.9	

Frinton & Walton
Party	Candidate	Votes	%	±%
Conservative	David Rex*	6,042	54.5	−1.0
Labour	Brian Theadom	3,116	28.1	+3.2
Liberal Democrats	Jeffrey Bray	1,922	17.3	−2.3
Majority		2,926	26.4	
Turnout		11,080	72.4	
Conservative hold		Swing	▼2.1	

Harwich
Party	Candidate	Votes	%	±%
Labour	Leslie Double	4,645	53.7	+35.9
Conservative	Eric Yallop	2,338	27.0	+9.2
Liberal Democrats	Rosemary Smith	1,669	19.3	+11.5
Majority		2,307	26.7	
Turnout		8,652	71.1	
Labour gain from Independent		Swing	▲13.4	

Tendring Rural East
Party	Candidate	Votes	%	±%
Conservative	Charles Lumber*	3,232	40.3	−2.1
Labour	William Mixter	2,626	32.8	−0.9
Liberal Democrats	Mark De Roy	2,160	26.9	+3.0
Majority		606	7.6	
Turnout		8,018	73.0	
Conservative hold		Swing	▼0.6	

Tendring Rural West
Party	Candidate	Votes	%	±%
Liberal Democrats	Kevin Hawkins	2,872	32.2	−1.5
Labour	Gregory Morgan	2,602	29.2	−0.7
Conservative	Rosalind Tovell	1,846	20.7	−15.7
Independent	Douglas Pallett	1,598	17.9	N/A
Majority		270	3.0	
Turnout		8,918	74.8	
Liberal Democrats gain from Conservative		Swing	▼0.4	

=== Uttlesford ===
Uttlesford District Summary
Party	Seats	+/-	Votes	%	+/-
Conservative	4	▲3	17,507	43.8	+3.0
Liberal Democrats	0	▼3	13,380	33.5	–10.2
Labour	0	Steady	8,211	20.5	+4.9
Independent	0	Steady	653	1.6	N/A
Green	0	Steady	212	0.5	N/A
Total	4	Steady	39,963	75.5	+35.1

Division results

Dunmow
Party	Candidate	Votes	%	±%
Conservative	David Westcott*	4,604	50.2	+0.9
Liberal Democrats	Geoffrey Powers	2,805	30.6	−6.0
Labour	William McCarthy	1,766	19.2	+5.2
Majority		1,799	19.6	
Turnout		9,175	75.4	
Conservative hold		Swing	▲3.5	

Saffron Walden
Party	Candidate	Votes	%	±%
Conservative	Robert Chambers	4,290	35.9	+2.4
Labour	Russell Green	3,450	28.9	+1.6
Liberal Democrats	John Lefever*	3,334	27.9	−11.3
Independent	Raymond Tyler	653	5.5	N/A
Green	Gerald Lucy	212	1.8	N/A
Majority		840	7.0	
Turnout		11,939	76.4	
Conservative gain from Liberal Democrats		Swing	▲0.4	

Stansted
Party	Candidate	Votes	%	±%
Conservative	Richard Wallace	4,298	43.4	+3.9
Liberal Democrats	Melvin Caton*	4,020	40.6	−13.0
Labour	Adam Pounds	1,579	16.0	+9.1
Majority		278	2.8	
Turnout		9,897	75.0	
Conservative gain from Liberal Democrats		Swing	▲8.5	

Thaxted
Party	Candidate	Votes	%	±%
Conservative	John Whitehead	4,315	48.2	+4.1
Liberal Democrats	David Morgan	3,221	36.0	−8.8
Labour	Gordon Murray	1,416	15.8	+4.6
Majority		1,095	12.2	
Turnout		8,952	75.1	
Conservative gain from Liberal Democrats		Swing	▲6.5	

== By-elections ==
=== Southend ===
Thorpe
Party	Candidate	Votes	%	±%
Conservative	Daphne White	4,125	56.6	−4.6
Labour	Heather Searle	1,915	26.3	+6.5
Liberal Democrats	Derek Holliday	1,251	17.2	−2.0
Majority		2,210	30.3	−11.1
Turnout		7,291	63.8	+36.7
Conservative hold		Swing	▼5.5	
