= 2001 Essex County Council election =

2001 UK local government election

← 1997	7 June 2001	2005 →

All 79 seats to Essex County Council 40 seats needed for a majority

	First party	Second party	Third party
Leader	Paul White	Mervyn Juliff	Kenneth Jones
Party	Conservative	Labour	Liberal Democrats
Leader since		May 1997	May 1997
Leader's seat	Stock	Great Parndon	Park
Last election	40 seats, 38.9%	23 seats, 31.7%	15 seats, 26.6%
Seats before	37	24	13
Seats won	49	19	10
Seat change	▲9	▼4	▼5
Popular vote	257,991	189,122	150,224
Percentage	41.7%	30.6%	24.3%
Swing	▲2.8%	▼1.1%	▼2.3%
	Fourth party
Leader	Christopher Harper
Party	Loughton Residents
Leader since	May 1997
Leader's seat	Loughton St Marys (Retiring)
Last election	1 seats, 0.7%
Seats before	1
Seats won	1
Seat change	Steady
Popular vote	2,734
Percentage	0.4%
- Results of the 2001 Essex County Council election
Leader before election
Paul White
Conservative
No overall control
Leader after election
Paul White
Conservative

The 2001 Essex County Council election took place on 7 June 2001 to elect members of Essex County Council in Essex, England. This was on the same day as other local elections and the 2001 general election.

79 councillors were elected from various electoral divisions, which returned either one or two county councillors each by first-past-the-post voting for a four-year term of office. The electoral divisions were the same as those used at the previous election in 1997.

At the election, the Conservatives regained majority control of Essex County Council.

== Previous composition ==
=== 1997 election ===
Party	Seats
Conservative	40
Labour	23
Liberal Democrats	15
Loughton Residents	1
Total	79

=== Composition of council seats before election ===
Party	Seats
Conservative	37
Labour	24
Liberal Democrats	13
Independent	4
Loughton Residents	1
Total	79

== Summary ==
=== Election result ===
2001 Essex County Council election
Party	Candidates	Seats	Gains	Losses	Net gain/loss	Seats %	Votes %	Votes	+/−
Conservative	79	49	10	1	▲9	62.0	41.7	257,991	+2.8
Labour	79	19	1	5	▼4	24.1	30.6	189,122	−1.1
Liberal Democrats	79	10	1	6	▼5	12.7	24.3	150,224	−2.3
Loughton Residents	1	1			Steady	1.3	0.4	2,395	−0.3
Green	29	0			Steady		1.9	12,048	+0.8
Community Representatives	3	0			Steady		0.6	3,547	N/A
Independent	9	0			Steady		0.6	3,458	−0.4
Total	279	79						618,785	

=== Election of Group Leaders ===
Paul White (Stock) was re elected leader of the Conservative Group, Paul Sztumpf (Harlow North) was elected leader of the Labour Group and Kenneth Jones (Park) was re elected leader of the Liberal Democratic Group.

=== Election of Leader of the Council ===
Paul White the leader of the conservative group was duly elected leader of the council and formed a conservative administration.

== Results by Electoral Divisions ==
=== Basildon ===
District summary

Party	Seats	+/-	Votes	%	+/-
Conservative	5	Steady	29,975	43.0	+5.6
Labour	5	Steady	27,380	39.3	−0.6
Liberal Democrat	0	Steady	12,112	17.4	−5.2
Independent	0	Steady	206	0.3	+0.3

Division results

Basildon Fryerns
Party	Candidate	Votes	%	±%
Labour	William Archibald *	3,057	63.1	−3.3
Conservative	William Marck	1,151	23.8	−0.4
Liberal Democrats	John Lutton	637	13.2	+3.7
Majority		1,906	39.3	−2.9
Turnout		4,845	52.2	−16.4
Labour hold		Swing	−1.5	

Basildon Gloucester Park
Party	Candidate	Votes	%	±%
Labour	Paul Kirkman	3,555	58.4	−2.5
Conservative	Anthony Ball	1,763	29.0	+3.0
Liberal Democrats	Michael Dickinson	768	12.6	−0.4
Majority		1,792	29.4	−5.6
Turnout		6,086	55.5	−16.4
Labour hold		Swing	−2.8	

Basildon Laindon
Party	Candidate	Votes	%	±%
Labour	Rachel Liebeschuetz *	2,478	51.4	−4.7
Conservative	Victor York	1,691	35.1	+5.7
Liberal Democrats	Ronald Sargent	545	11.3	−3.2
Independent	Alfred Viccary	103	2.1	+2.1
Majority		787	16.3	−10.4
Turnout		4,817	49.2	−16.3
Labour hold		Swing	−5.2	

Basildon Vange
Party	Candidate	Votes	%	±%
Labour	Swatantra Nadanwar *	3,426	55.4	−0.7
Conservative	Tony Thomas	1,842	29.8	+0.3
Liberal Democrats	Mark Hersom	920	14.9	+0.4
Majority		1,584	25.6	−1.1
Turnout		6,188	48.7	−16.8
Labour hold		Swing	−0.5	

Basildon Westley Heights
Party	Candidate	Votes	%	±%
Conservative	David Walsh	3,318	41.5	+0.7
Labour	Robert Sears *	3,014	37.7	+2.0
Liberal Democrats	Linda Williams	1,658	20.8	−2.7
Majority		304	3.8	−1.4
Turnout		7,990	60.9	−15.5
Conservative hold		Swing	−0.7	

Between 1997 and 2001, the seat was won by Labour in a by-election, however it is shown as a Conservative hold as it is compared to the previous full council election.

Billericay North
Party	Candidate	Votes	%	±%
Conservative	Anthony Hedley	5,290	58.5	+7.2
Liberal Democrats	Francis Bellard	2,170	24.0	−10.6
Labour	Geoffrey Viney	1,584	17.5	+3.4
Majority		3,120	34.5	+17.8
Turnout		9,044	64.6	−10.9
Conservative hold		Swing	+8.9	

Billericay South
Party	Candidate	Votes	%	±%
Conservative	Kay Twitchen *	4,016	49.1	+5.8
Liberal Democrats	James Edwards	2,239	27.4	−9.9
Labour	Patricia Reid	1,928	23.6	+4.1
Majority		1,777	21.7	+15.7
Turnout		8,183	65.1	−10.6
Conservative hold		Swing	+7.9	

Crouch
Party	Candidate	Votes	%	±%
Conservative	Donald Morris *	3,575	52.1	+8.1
Labour	Andrew Manning	2,096	30.6	+5.4
Liberal Democrats	Jonathan Myall	1,195	17.4	−13.5
Majority		1,479	21.5	+8.4
Turnout		6,866	58.4	−14.9
Conservative hold		Swing	+1.4	

Pitsea
Party	Candidate	Votes	%	±%
Labour	Keith Bobbin *	4,256	52.9	−1.4
Conservative	Jacqueline Blake	2,914	36.2	+4.5
Liberal Democrats	Vivien Howard	878	10.9	−1.9
Majority		1,342	16.7	−5.9
Turnout		8,048	49.0	−14.5
Labour hold		Swing	−3.0	

Wickford
Party	Candidate	Votes	%	±%
Conservative	Iris Pummell *	4,566	50.9	+4.9
Labour	Christopher Wilson	2,934	32.7	+4.3
Liberal Democrats	Fane Cummings	1,477	16.5	−9.2
Majority		1,632	18.2	+0.6
Turnout		8,977	57.5	−14.8
Conservative hold		Swing	+0.3	

=== Braintree ===
District summary

Party	Seats	+/-	Votes	%	+/-
Conservative	6	▲4	26,044	40.1	+2.9
Labour	1	▼3	23,236	35.8	−1.5
Liberal Democrat	0	▼1	11,259	17.3	−4.1
Green	0	Steady	4,409	6.8	+2.7

Division results

Bocking
Party	Candidate	Votes	%	±%
Conservative	Simon Walsh	3,421	41.1	+4.3
Labour	Frederick Card *	3,301	39.7	−2.7
Liberal Democrats	Peter Braley	1,068	12.8	−4.3
Green	Duncan Stewart	531	6.4	+2.7
Majority		120	1.4	
Turnout		8,321	64.7	−5.4
Conservative gain from Labour		Swing	+3.5	

Braintree East
Party	Candidate	Votes	%	±%
Conservative	Nigel Edey	4,372	39.7	+2.8
Labour	Elwyn Bishop *	4,290	38.9	−3.5
Liberal Democrats	Terrence Brooks	1,672	15.2	−1.9
Green	Jeremy Smith	688	6.2	+2.6
Majority		82	0.7	
Turnout		11,022	64.1	−6.0
Conservative gain from Labour		Swing	+3.1	

Braintree West
Party	Candidate	Votes	%	±%
Conservative	Roger Walters	4,304	37.9	+5.6
Labour	Barbara Buchan	3,741	32.9	+1.4
Liberal Democrats	Anthony Meadows	2,843	25.0	−8.3
Green	Wendy Partridge	473	4.2	+1.4
Majority		563	5.0	
Turnout		11,361	63.6	−11.4
Conservative gain from Liberal Democrats		Swing	+7.0	

Halstead
Party	Candidate	Votes	%	±%
Conservative	Joseph Pike *	4,046	44.3	+4.2
Labour	Malcolm Fincken	3,021	33.1	+0.7
Liberal Democrats	Stephen Bolter	1,668	18.3	−4.9
Green	Philip Hughes	390	4.3	+0.0
Majority		1,025	11.2	+3.5
Turnout		9,125	62.3	−11.3
Conservative hold		Swing	+1.8	

Hedingham
Party	Candidate	Votes	%	±%
Conservative	David Finch	4,084	47.7	+2.8
Labour	John Kotz	2,166	25.3	−0.3
Liberal Democrats	Trevor Ellis	1,910	22.3	−4.0
Green	Nicholas Scales	409	4.8	+1.5
Majority		1,918	22.4	+3.9
Turnout		8,569	65.4	−11.7
Conservative hold		Swing	+1.6	

Witham Northern
Party	Candidate	Votes	%	±%
Labour	Phillp Barlow	3,626	42.0	−5.3
Conservative	Jennifer Jarvis	2,513	29.1	−1.1
Green	James Abbott	1,458	16.9	+9.1
Liberal Democrats	Barry Fleet	1,035	12.0	−2.7
Majority		1,113	12.9	−4.2
Turnout		8,632	61.2	−12.0
Labour hold		Swing	−2.1	

Witham Southern
Party	Candidate	Votes	%	±%
Conservative	Keith Bigden	3,304	41.7	+3.3
Labour	John Gyford *	3,091	39.0	−1.8
Liberal Democrats	Lesley Beckett	1,063	13.4	−3.5
Green	Nelson Brunton	460	5.8	+2.0
Majority		213	2.7	
Turnout		7,918	62.6	−10.7
Conservative gain from Labour		Swing	+2.6	

=== Brentwood ===
District summary

Party	Seats	+/-	Votes	%	+/-
Conservative	4	Steady	15,251	41.5	−2.3
Liberal Democrat	1	Steady	12,151	33.1	−2.8
Labour	0	Steady	5,983	16.3	-3.0
Independent	0	Steady	2,197	6.0	+6.0
Green	0	Steady	1,150	3.1	+2.2

Division results

Brentwood Central
Party	Candidate	Votes	%	±%
Liberal Democrats	Barry Aspinell	2,448	41.0	−1.8
Conservative	Francis Kenny	1,764	29.6	−7.3
Labour	Michele Wigram	1,014	17.0	−3.3
Green	Anthony Stokes	325	5.5	+5.5
Independent	Kathleen Galbraith	216	3.6	+3.6
Independent	Edgar Davis *	201	3.4	+3.4
Majority		684	11.5	+5.5
Turnout		5,968	63.1	−8.1
Liberal Democrats hold		Swing	+2.8	

Brentwood Hutton
Party	Candidate	Votes	%	±%
Conservative	John Roberts *	3,858	48.6	−0.1
Liberal Democrats	Geoffrey Taylor	2,100	26.5	−7.4
Labour	Charles Bisson	1,346	17.0	−0.4
Independent	Greta Taylor	367	4.6	+4.6
Green	Roy Upchurch	264	3.3	+3.3
Majority		1,758	22.2	+16.2
Turnout		7,935	67.1	−4.1
Conservative hold		Swing	+3.7	

Brentwood North
Party	Candidate	Votes	%	±%
Conservative	Philip Baker	2,244	35.7	−6.7
Liberal Democrats	Charles Myers	2,154	34.3	−0.5
Labour	Bernadette Pavitt	879	14.0	−3.4
Independent	Judith Gray *	807	12.9	+12.9
Green	Frank Seckleman	191	3.0	−2.3
Majority		90	1.4	−6.8
Turnout		6,275	68.9	−5.8
Conservative hold		Swing	−3.1	

Brentwood Rural
Party	Candidate	Votes	%	±%
Conservative	Roger Dyson	3,393	40.7	−2.4
Liberal Democrats	Derek Hardy	3,130	37.5	−2.0
Labour	Cornelius Maxey	934	11.2	−2.1
Independent	Alison Enkel *	401	4.8	+4.8
Green	Beryl Lankester	276	3.3	−0.8
Independent	Eileen Mickelborough	205	2.5	+2.5
Majority		263	3.2	−0.4
Turnout		8,339	67.9	−8.9
Conservative hold		Swing	−0.2	

Brentwood South
Party	Candidate	Votes	%	±%
Conservative	Lionel Lee *	2,843	38.8	−4.7
Liberal Democrats	Michael Taylor	2,319	31.6	+3.3
Labour	David Minns	1,810	24.7	−3.5
Green	Margaret Willis	358	4.9	+4.9
Majority		524	7.1	−8.1
Turnout		7,330	65.6	−9.9
Conservative hold		Swing	−4.0	

=== Castle Point ===
District summary

Party	Seats	+/-	Votes	%	+/-
Conservative	4	Steady	19,247	48.8	+3.6
Labour	2	Steady	15,715	39.9	−0.5
Liberal Democrat	0	Steady	4,126	10.5	−4.0
Green	0	Steady	320	0.8	+0.8

Division results

Benfleet
Party	Candidate	Votes	%	±%
Conservative	Jillian Reeves *	3,061	50.7	+2.7
Labour	Brian Wilson	2,314	38.3	+0.3
Liberal Democrats	Beryl Handford	668	11.1	−2.9
Majority		747	12.4	+2.4
Turnout		6,043	61.4	−12.4
Conservative hold		Swing	+1.2	

Canvey Island East
Party	Candidate	Votes	%	±%
Labour	Dennis Williams *	3,721	47.6	−0.5
Conservative	Jeanette Blissett	3,170	40.6	+1.2
Liberal Democrats	Peggy Pearse	604	7.7	−4.8
Green	Christopher Keene	320	4.1	+4.1
Majority		551	7.1	−1.6
Turnout		7,815	53.4	−12.7
Labour hold		Swing	−0.8	

Canvey Island West
Party	Candidate	Votes	%	±%
Conservative	Raymond Howard *	4,180	55.7	+4.2
Labour	Brian Weller	2,849	38.0	−2.2
Liberal Democrats	Dawn Giles	471	6.3	−1.0
Majority		7,500	17.7	+6.3
Turnout		1,331	53.1	−14.5
Conservative hold		Swing	+3.2	

Great Tarpots
Party	Candidate	Votes	%	±%
Labour	Alfred Goldsworth *	2,936	44.8	+1.2
Conservative	Jacqueline Govier	2,914	44.4	+3.0
Liberal Democrats	Joyce Giles	711	10.8	−4.2
Majority		22	0.3	−1.8
Turnout		6,561	60.2	−2.8
Labour hold		Swing	−0.9	

Hadleigh
Party	Candidate	Votes	%	±%
Conservative	Ronald Williams *	3,088	54.2	+9.2
Labour	John Trollope	1,683	29.5	−1.1
Liberal Democrats	Michael Handford	931	16.3	−8.1
Majority		1,405	24.6	+10.2
Turnout		5,702	63.3	−11.3
Conservative hold		Swing	+5.1	

Thundersley
Party	Candidate	Votes	%	±%
Conservative	William Dick *	2,834	49.0	+3.1
Labour	Roy English	2,212	38.2	+0.8
Liberal Democrats	Marie Crouch	741	12.8	−3.9
Majority		622	10.7	+2.2
Turnout		5,787	59.5	−14.3
Conservative hold		Swing	+1.1	

=== Chelmsford ===
District summary

Party	Seats	+/-	Votes	%	+/-
Conservative	4	Steady	30,166	40.2	+1.2
Liberal Democrat	4	Steady	23,531	31.3	−3.3
Labour	1	Steady	18,464	24.6	+2.3
Green	0	Steady	2,941	3.9	+1.4

Division results

Broomfield & Writtle
Party	Candidate	Votes	%	±%
Conservative	Wendy Cole *	2,900	43.7	+10.7
Liberal Democrats	Angela Robinson	2,031	30.6	−0.4
Labour	Simon Barke	1,458	22.0	+4.2
Green	Carolyn Hobbs-Waller	243	3.7	+1.5
Majority		869	13.1	+11.1
Turnout		6,632	64.5	−10.5
Conservative hold		Swing	+5.6	

Chelmsford East
Party	Candidate	Votes	%	±%
Liberal Democrats	Ian Gale *	3,295	41.4	+1.8
Conservative	David Lee	2,691	33.8	−2.3
Labour	Robert Miller	1,734	21.8	+0.4
Green	John Mudd	233	2.9	+1.2
Majority		604	7.6	+4.1
Turnout		7,953	63.3	−13.2
Liberal Democrats hold		Swing	+2.1	

Chelmsford North
Party	Candidate	Votes	%	±%
Liberal Democrats	Tom Smith-Hughes *	2,796	38.6	+0.4
Labour	Joan Bliss	2,185	30.2	+0.3
Conservative	Kathleen Pauley	2,076	28.7	−1.6
Green	Angela Thomson	187	2.6	+1.0
Majority		611	8.4	+0.5
Turnout		7,244	61.3	−15.3
Liberal Democrats hold		Swing	+0.1	

Chelmsford South
Party	Candidate	Votes	%	±%
Liberal Democrats	George Allen *	2,935	39.4	−6.0
Conservative	Neil Gulliver	2,480	33.3	+0.1
Labour	Robert Jones	1,801	24.2	+5.2
Green	Joyce Shiner	239	3.2	+0.9
Majority		455	6.1	−1.8
Turnout		7,455	64.4	−12.2
Liberal Democrats hold		Swing	−3.1	

Chelmsford West
Party	Candidate	Votes	%	±%
Labour	Neil Spurgeon *	2,242	38.1	+2.6
Liberal Democrats	Stephen Robinson	1,910	32.4	−2.9
Conservative	Alastair Tween	1,544	26.2	−3.0
Green	Sheila Patrick	194	3.3	+3.3
Majority		332	5.6	+5.4
Turnout		5,890	56.0	−15.5
Labour hold		Swing	+2.7	

Great Baddow
Party	Candidate	Votes	%	±%
Liberal Democrats	Maureen Miller	2,735	42.9	−4.7
Conservative	David Sismey	2,068	32.4	+1.4
Labour	Norman Hunt	1,350	21.2	+1.6
Green	James Cross	228	3.6	+1.8
Majority		667	10.5	−6.1
Turnout		6,381	61.8	−13.5
Liberal Democrats hold		Swing	−3.1	

Springfield
Party	Candidate	Votes	%	±%
Conservative	Peter Martin *	5,682	44.7	+1.3
Liberal Democrats	Michael Mackrory	3,526	27.8	−6.6
Labour	William Horslen	2,913	22.9	+4.5
Green	Eleanor Burgess	584	4.6	+0.7
Majority		2,156	17.0	+7.9
Turnout		12,705	60.7	−13.9
Conservative hold		Swing	+3.9	

Stock
Party	Candidate	Votes	%	±%
Conservative	Paul White *	4,712	53.0	+3.7
Labour	David Howell	2,395	26.9	+2.2
Liberal Democrats	Margaret Hutchon	1,380	15.5	−7.0
Green	Robert Kenney	405	4.6	+1.1
Majority		2,317	26.1	+1.5
Turnout		8,892	63.5	−11.4
Conservative hold		Swing	+0.7	

Woodham Ferrers & Danbury
Party	Candidate	Votes	%	±%
Conservative	Norman Hume	6,013	50.3	+0.2
Liberal Democrats	Ian Roberts	2,923	24.5	−1.8
Labour	Madeline Diamond	2,386	20.0	+0.1
Green	Colin Budgey	628	5.3	+1.5
Majority		3,090	25.9	+1.3
Turnout		11,950	59.5	−15.4
Conservative hold		Swing	+1.0	

=== Colchester ===
District summary

Party	Seats	+/-	Votes	%	+/-
Conservative	4	▲1	27,089	38.4	+4.2
Liberal Democrat	3	▼2	22,542	31.9	−1.7
Labour	2	▲1	20,076	28.4	−0.6
Green	0	Steady	874	1.2	+0.8

Division results

Constable
Party	Candidate	Votes	%	±%
Conservative	Anthony Clover *	3,954	52.0	+6.2
Liberal Democrats	Andrew Phillips	2,021	26.6	−6.7
Labour	Geraldine Harris	1,624	21.4	+0.5
Majority		1,933	25.4	+12.9
Turnout		7,599	67.4	−9.4
Conservative hold		Swing	+6.4	

Drury
Party	Candidate	Votes	%	±%
Conservative	Jeremy Lucas	3,564	41.3	+2.3
Liberal Democrats	Una Jones	3,304	38.2	−1.5
Labour	David Harris	1,773	20.5	−0.8
Majority		260	3.0	+2.2
Turnout		8,641	65.4	−9.0
Conservative gain from Liberal Democrats		Swing	+1.9	

Maypole
Party	Candidate	Votes	%	±%
Labour	Richard Bourne	2,321	36.9	+1.9
Liberal Democrats	Irene Brady	2,270	36.1	−5.4
Conservative	Sonia Lewis	1,694	27.0	+3.5
Majority		51	0.8	
Turnout		6,285	49.0	−14.9
Labour gain from Liberal Democrats		Swing	+3.7	

Mersea and Stanway
Party	Candidate	Votes	%	±%
Conservative	Christopher Manning-Press *	4,707	45.4	+1.1
Liberal Democrats	Gwendoline Ilott	2,984	28.8	−5.1
Labour	Edna Salmon	2,181	21.0	−0.8
Green	Walter Schwartz	504	4.9	New
Majority		1,723	16.6	+6.2
Turnout		10,376	64.8	−9.9
Conservative hold		Swing	+3.1	

Old Heath
Party	Candidate	Votes	%	±%
Liberal Democrats	Margaret Fisher *	3,026	43.6	+0.3
Labour	Kim Naish	2,336	33.7	−1.6
Conservative	Nicholas Taylor	1,574	22.7	+1.3
Majority		690	9.9	+1.8
Turnout		6,936	52.3	−15.2
Liberal Democrats hold		Swing	+0.9	

Park
Party	Candidate	Votes	%	±%
Liberal Democrats	Kenneth Jones *	3,052	38.6	+2.2
Conservative	Neil Stock	2,596	32.8	−0.5
Labour	Richard Bartholomew	2,267	28.6	−1.6
Majority		456	5.8	+2.7
Turnout		7,915	54.6	−12.0
Liberal Democrats hold		Swing	+1.3	

Parsons Heath
Party	Candidate	Votes	%	±%
Liberal Democrats	Theresa Higgins	3,225	38.1	−4.0
Conservative	Derek Smith	2,780	32.9	+3.6
Labour	Edmund Chinnery	2,457	29.0	+0.4
Majority		445	5.3	−7.6
Turnout		8,462	57.4	−11.9
Liberal Democrats hold		Swing	−3.8	

Tiptree
Party	Candidate	Votes	%	±%
Conservative	Edmund Peel *	3,718	47.2	+7.3
Labour	Marion Williams	2,315	29.4	−2.1
Liberal Democrats	Craig Sutton	1471	18.7	New
Green	Cheryl Gerrard	370	4.7	+0.5
Majority		1,403	17.8	+9.3
Turnout		7,874	62.1	−11.0
Conservative hold		Swing	+4.7	

No Independent candidate as previous (−24.3).

Wivenhoe St Andrew
Party	Candidate	Votes	%	±%
Labour	Julie Young	2,802	43.2	+0.9
Conservative	Kenneth Rogers	1,926	29.7	+3.3
Liberal Democrats	Stephen Lancaster	1,765	27.2	−4.1
Majority		876	13.5	+2.5
Turnout		6,493	49.0	−14.4
Labour hold		Swing	−1.2	

=== Epping Forest ===
District summary

Party	Seats	+/-	Votes	%	+/-
Conservative	5	Steady	25,480	46.1	+2.9
Liberal Democrat	2	▲1	13,506	24.5	+4.7
Loughton Residents	1	Steady	2,395	4.3	−3.2
Labour	0	▼1	13,837	25.1	−4.4

Division results

Buckhurst Hill
Party	Candidate	Votes	%	±%
Liberal Democrats	Ann Haigh	3,037	47.4	+4.3
Conservative	James Brokenshire	2,365	36.9	+0.2
Labour	Ronald Rodwell	1,011	15.8	−4.4
Majority		672	10.5	+4.3
Turnout		6,413	61.3	−11.6
Liberal Democrats hold		Swing	+2.1	

Chigwell
Party	Candidate	Votes	%	±%
Conservative	Michael Tomkins *	3,016	54.3	−3.0
Liberal Democrats	Patricia Brooks	1,515	27.3	+4.1
Labour	David Tetlow	1,024	18.4	−1.1
Majority		1,501	27.0	−7.2
Turnout		5,555	58.2	−12.4
Conservative hold		Swing	−3.5	

Epping
Party	Candidate	Votes	%	±%
Liberal Democrats	Janet Whitehouse	3,299	43.8	+16.1
Conservative	Dennis Ramshaw *	3,005	39.9	−5.9
Labour	Anne Baldwin	1,224	16.3	−10.2
Majority		294	3.9	−14.2
Turnout		7,528	63.3	−8.8
Liberal Democrats gain from Conservative		Swing	+11.0	

Loughton St Johns
Party	Candidate	Votes	%	±%
Conservative	Colin Finn	2,271	42.5	+17.0
Labour	Stanley Goodwin *	2,227	41.6	+4.6
Liberal Democrats	Niall De Lacy	851	15.9	+9.4
Majority		44	0.8	−5.3
Turnout		5,349	54.6	−15.1
Conservative gain from Labour		Swing	+6.2	

Loughton St. Marys
Party	Candidate	Votes	%	±%
Loughton Residents	David Linnell	2,395	37.2	+0.3
Conservative	Stephen Metcalfe	1,973	30.7	+5.8
Labour	Colin Huckle	1,644	25.6	−6.9
Liberal Democrats	Christopher Spence	421	6.5	+0.8
Majority		422	6.6	+2.2
Turnout		6,433	60.2	−13.4
Loughton Residents hold		Swing	−2.7	

North Weald & Nazeing
Party	Candidate	Votes	%	±%
Conservative	Anthony Jackson	4,111	59.3	+2.7
Labour	Barry Johns	1,856	26.8	−1.1
Liberal Democrats	Monica Richardson	970	14.0	−1.4
Majority		2,255	32.5	−3.8
Turnout		6,937	62.9	−12.0
Conservative hold		Swing	+1.9	

Ongar
Party	Candidate	Votes	%	±%
Conservative	Gerard McEwen *	4,423	49.7	+2.1
Liberal Democrats	Douglas Kelly	2,494	28.1	+3.7
Labour	Keith Tait	1,974	22.2	−5.7
Majority		1,929	21.7	−1.9
Turnout		8,891	65.5	−10.0
Conservative hold		Swing	−0.8	

Waltham Abbey
Party	Candidate	Votes	%	±%
Conservative	Elizabeth Webster *	4,316	53.2	+5.6
Labour	Albert Farren	2,877	35.5	−4.9
Liberal Democrats	Olive Dunseath	919	11.3	−0.8
Majority		1,439	17.7	+10.5
Turnout		8,112	52.8	−14.9
Conservative hold		Swing	+5.3	

=== Harlow ===
District summary

Party	Seats	+/-	Votes	%	+/-
Labour	5	Steady	15,621	44.9	−9.0
Conservative	0	Steady	11,100	31.9	+2.8
Liberal Democrat	0	Steady	8,084	23.2	+7.3

Division results

Great Parndon
Party	Candidate	Votes	%	±%
Labour	Rob Eschle	3,109	44.2	−7.3
Conservative	Guy Mitchinson	2,790	39.7	+4.8
Liberal Democrats	Ian Jackson	1,131	16.1	+2.4
Majority		319	4.5	−12.2
Turnout		7,030	58.6	−14.2
Labour hold		Swing	−6.1	

Harlow & Mark Hall
Party	Candidate	Votes	%	±%
Labour	Paul Sztumpf *	2,668	41.4	−10.2
Conservative	Simon Carter	1,948	30.2	−4.7
Liberal Democrats	Robert Thurston	1,836	28.5	+14.8
Majority		720	11.2	−5.5
Turnout		6,452	62.7	−10.1
Labour hold		Swing	−2.8	

Harlow Common
Party	Candidate	Votes	%	±%
Labour	Anthony Durcan *	3,633	41.0	−10.3
Conservative	Anthony Hall	3,395	38.3	+7.7
Liberal Democrats	Lorna Spenceley	1,836	20.7	+5.3
Majority		238	11.2	−8.7
Turnout		8,864	62.7	−10.3
Labour hold		Swing	−9.0	

Little Parndon and Town Centre
Party	Candidate	Votes	%	±%
Labour	Edith Morris *	3,062	52.6	−4.8
Conservative	Andrew Shannon	1,621	27.9	+3.1
Liberal Democrats	Paul Lawton	1,135	19.5	+4.4
Majority		1,441	24.8	−8.8
Turnout		5,818	58.0	−15.6
Labour hold		Swing	−3.9	

Netteswellbury
Party	Candidate	Votes	%	±%
Labour	Jenny Holland	3,149	47.4	−12.8
Liberal Democrats	Nicholas Macy	2,146	32.3	+17.5
Conservative	Joshua Jolles	1,346	20.3	−4.8
Majority		1,003	15.1	−18.5
Turnout		6,641	59.1	−14.5
Labour hold		Swing	−15.2	

=== Maldon ===
District summary

Party	Seats	+/-	Votes	%	+/-
Conservative	3	Steady	13,960	48.5	+6.1
Labour	0	Steady	8,303	28.9	+4.2
Liberal Democrat	0	Steady	4,645	16.2	−7.5
Green	0	Steady	1,862	6.5	+2.2

Division results

Maldon
Party	Candidate	Votes	%	±%
Conservative	Brian Mead	4,409	46.8	+10.0
Labour	Peter Roberts	3,070	32.6	+6.6
Liberal Democrats	Janetta Sosin	1,313	13.9	−5.1
Green	Michael Cole	633	6.7	+6.7
Majority		1,339	14.2	+3.4
Turnout		9,425	63.4	−11.6
Conservative hold		Swing	+1.7	

Southminster
Party	Candidate	Votes	%	±%
Conservative	Robert Boyce *	4,886	49.4	+2.8
Labour	Terence Quinlan	2,917	29.5	−0.7
Liberal Democrats	Alan Weeks	1,467	14.8	−3.5
Green	Mark Ellis	617	6.2	+1.5
Majority		1,969	19.9	+3.5
Turnout		9,887	60.3	−11.4
Conservative hold		Swing	+1.8	

Tollesbury
Party	Candidate	Votes	%	±%
Conservative	Rodney Bass *	4,665	49.3	+5.5
Labour	Michael Bentley	2,316	24.5	+7.0
Liberal Democrats	Jane Jackson	1,865	19.7	−14.0
Green	Jonathan King	612	6.5	+1.5
Majority		2,349	24.8	+14.8
Turnout		9,458	63.9	−11.7
Conservative hold		Swing	−0.7	

=== Rochford ===
District summary

Party	Seats	+/-	Votes	%	+/-
Conservative	5	▲3	17,719	47.1	+6.4
Labour	0	▼1	10,316	27.4	−0.7
Liberal Democrat	0	▼2	8,400	22.3	−8.8
Independent	0	Steady	1,158	3.1	+3.1

Division results

Rayleigh North
Party	Candidate	Votes	%	±%
Conservative	Stephen Castle	3,444	47.9	+10.6
Liberal Democrats	Geoffrey Williams	2,315	32.2	−11.5
Labour	David Husk	1,438	20.0	+0.9
Majority		1,129	15.7	+
Turnout		7,197	61.4	−13.7
Conservative gain from Liberal Democrats		Swing	+11.1	

Rayleigh South
Party	Candidate	Votes	%	±%
Conservative	Mavis Webster	3,555	44.7	+6.8
Liberal Democrats	Nicholas Harris	2,560	32.2	−6.9
Labour	Mary Stevenson	1,839	23.1	+0.1
Majority		995	12.5	
Turnout		7,954	59.8	−13.2
Conservative gain from Liberal Democrats		Swing	+6.9	

Rochford North
Party	Candidate	Votes	%	±%
Conservative	Tracey Chapman *	3,512	43.1	+3.2
Labour	David Ford	2,041	25.1	−0.7
Liberal Democrats	Peter Lock	1,430	17.6	−16.8
Independent	John Mason	1,158	14.2	+14.2
Majority		1,471	18.1	+12.5
Turnout		8,141	60.9	−12.0
Conservative hold		Swing	+2.0	

Rochford South
Party	Candidate	Votes	%	±%
Conservative	Roy Pearson	3,180	47.0	+5.8
Labour	Graham Fox *	2,776	41.0	−1.1
Liberal Democrats	Mary Beckers	809	12.0	−4.7
Majority		404	6.0	+
Turnout		6,765	57.4	−13.7
Conservative gain from Labour		Swing	+3.4	

Rochford West
Party	Candidate	Votes	%	±%
Conservative	Elizabeth Hart *	4,028	53.5	+6.3
Labour	Peter Stebbing	2,222	29.5	−2.3
Liberal Democrats	Paul Beckers	1,286	17.1	−4.0
Majority		1,806	24.0	+8.6
Turnout		7,536	59.1	−14.3
Conservative hold		Swing	+4.3	

=== Tendring ===
District summary

Party	Seats	+/-	Votes	%	+/-
Conservative	5	▲1	24,737	37.5	+1.8
Labour	3	Steady	24,146	36.6	−1.0
Liberal Democrat	0	▼1	13,021	19.7	−4.8
Community Representatives	0	Steady	3,547	5.4	+5.4
Independent	0	Steady	286	0.4	−1.7
Green	0	Steady	255	0.4	+0.4

Division results

Brightlingsea
Party	Candidate	Votes	%	±%
Conservative	Derek Robinson *	3,278	41.2	+6.6
Labour	Paul Bishop	2,388	30.0	−2.8
Liberal Democrats	Thomas Dale	2,038	25.6	−7.0
Green	Derek Skinner	255	3.2	+3.2
Majority		890	11.2	+4.1
Turnout		7,959	64.0	−1.6
Conservative hold		Swing	+4.7	

Clacton East
Party	Candidate	Votes	%	±%
Conservative	Catherine Jessop *	3,253	40.1	−4.0
Labour	Louise Armstrong	2,679	33.0	−1.9
Community Representative	Agnes Duffus	1,140	14.0	+14.0
Liberal Democrats	Peter Miller	1,046	12.9	−8.1
Majority		574	7.1	−2.1
Turnout		8,118	62.6	−6.9
Conservative hold		Swing	−1.1	

Clacton North
Party	Candidate	Votes	%	±%
Labour	Clive Baker *	3,339	38.4	+1.6
Liberal Democrats	Harold Shearing	2,747	31.6	−1.3
Conservative	Jeffrey Bray	2,601	29.9	−0.3
Majority		592	6.8	+2.9
Turnout		8,687	58.0	−9.2
Labour hold		Swing	+1.5	

Clacton West
Party	Candidate	Votes	%	±%
Labour	Roy Smith *	4,934	60.8	+6.0
Conservative	William Stone	2,348	28.9	−1.2
Liberal Democrats	John Candler	832	10.3	−4.8
Majority		2,586	31.9	+7.3
Turnout		8,114	55.8	−8.4
Labour hold		Swing	+3.6	

Frinton and Walton
Party	Candidate	Votes	%	±%
Conservative	Michael Page	5,763	55.6	+1.0
Labour	Kenneth Aldis	2,937	28.3	+0.2
Liberal Democrats	Charles Harrison	1,672	16.1	−1.2
Majority		2,826	27.2	+0.8
Turnout		10,372	68.0	−4.4
Conservative hold		Swing	+0.4	

Harwich
Party	Candidate	Votes	%	±%
Labour	Leslie Double *	3,593	45.1	−8.6
Community Representative	Steven Henderson	1,994	25.0	+25.0
Conservative	Mark Cossens	1,670	21.0	−6.1
Liberal Democrats	David Cattrell	710	8.9	−10.4
Majority		1,599	20.1	−6.6
Turnout		7,967	63.9	−7.2
Labour hold		Swing	−16.8	

Tendring Rural East
Party	Candidate	Votes	%	±%
Conservative	Charles Lumber *	2,879	40.3	−0.0
Labour	Ann Evander	2,277	31.9	−0.9
Liberal Democrats	Mark de Roy	1,576	22.1	−4.9
Community Representative	John Brown	413	5.8	+5.8
Majority		602	8.4	+0.8
Turnout		7,145	63.8	−9.2
Conservative hold		Swing	+0.4	

Tendring Rural West
Party	Candidate	Votes	%	±%
Conservative	Sarah Candy	2,945	38.6	+17.9
Liberal Democrats	Kevin Hawkins *	2,400	31.5	−0.8
Labour	Gregory Morgan	1,999	26.2	−3.0
Independent	Harry Bird	286	3.8	−14.2
Majority		545	7.1	+4.1
Turnout		7,630	63.9	−10.9
Conservative gain from Liberal Democrats		Swing	+	

=== Uttlesford ===
District summary

Party	Seats	+/-	Votes	%	+/-
Conservative	4	Steady	16,775	47.9	+4.1
Liberal Democrat	0	Steady	11,323	32.3	−1.2
Labour	0	Steady	6,449	18.4	−2.1
Green	0	Steady	477	1.4	+0.8

Division results

Dunmow
Party	Candidate	Votes	%	±%
Conservative	Susan Flack	4,259	53.1	+2.9
Liberal Democrats	Rodney Copping	1,997	24.9	−5.7
Labour	Harold Wright	1,761	22.0	+2.7
Majority		2,262	28.2	+8.6
Turnout		8,017	63.4	−12.0
Conservative hold		Swing	+4.3	

Saffron Walden
Party	Candidate	Votes	%	±%
Conservative	Robert Chambers *	4,683	45.0	+9.1
Liberal Democrats	Joan Dawson	3,452	33.2	+5.3
Labour	Yvonne Morton	2,267	21.8	−7.1
Majority		1,231	11.8	+4.8
Turnout		10,402	64.6	−11.8
Conservative hold		Swing	+1.9	

Stansted
Party	Candidate	Votes	%	±%
Conservative	Richard Wallace *	3,858	44.0	+0.6
Liberal Democrats	Peter Wilcock	3,837	43.8	+3.2
Labour	Michael Powell	1,072	12.2	−3.7
Majority		21	0.2	−2.6
Turnout		8,767	65.4	−9.6
Conservative hold		Swing	−1.3	

Thaxted
Party	Candidate	Votes	%	±%
Conservative	John Whitehead *	3,975	50.7	+2.5
Liberal Democrats	Alan Thawley	2,037	26.0	−10.0
Labour	Gordon Murray	1,349	17.2	+1.4
Green	Daniel Brett	477	6.1	+6.1
Majority		1,938	24.7	+12.5
Turnout		7,838	64.6	−10.5
Conservative hold		Swing	+6.3	
