= Alan Davies (charity executive) =

Richard Alan Michael Davies, known as Alan Davies, was Chief Executive of mental health charity 'Mind' and a Liberal Democrat politician.

Davies was a Civil Servant with the Immigration Service, Head of the Conveyancing Department at Essex County Council and a member of the legal department of Brentwood District Council having moved down from Clwyd County Council where he was also involved with property matters following his promotion from Slough Borough Council's legal department.

Prior to 1974 Davies had worked in various law firms as a Legal Executive in Muswell Hill, Barnet and Neasden.

Davies is married to Vicky Cook and has two grown-up daughters. His interests include squash, cricket and hockey.

Davies was the first elected Liberal Democrat Member for Hutton East Ward in Brentwood in May 1990. During the period of Liberal Democrat control of the council, he was Chairman of the Planning Committee for six years and later was chairman of the Policy Committee. He was also a member of the Environment and Technical, Housing, and Planning Panels.
