= Results of the 2019 European Parliament election in the United Kingdom by Westminster constituency =

Map of estimated results for Westminster constituencies

Estimated equivalent results for House of Commons constituencies in England, Scotland and Wales were produced by Professor Chris Hanretty of Royal Holloway, University of London. Hanretty warned that "These figures on their own tell us almost nothing about future general elections" and "These figures remain estimates, and so they are subject to error." Martin Baxter of Electoral Calculus returned a slightly different set of seat estimates based on these results. Similarly, he noted that the estimates were not useful at predicting the results of general election, comparing UKIP's vote share in the 2014 EU election (27%) to its share in the 2015 UK general election (13%). Hanretty's estimates are shown in the map and the tables here.

Parties	Seats
Brexit Party	414
Liberal Democrats	74
Labour Party	67
Scottish National Party	54
Plaid Cymru	10
Green Party	10
Conservative Party	1
Others	18
Brexit Party majority of 180

Constituency Name	Winner in 2017	Brexit Party		Change UK		Conservative		Green		Labour		Liberal Democrats		Other		Plaid Cymru		SNP		UKIP		Total Votes
Constituency Name	Winner in 2017	Votes	%	Votes	%	Votes	%	Votes	%	Votes	%	Votes	%	Votes	%	Votes	%	Votes	%	Votes	%	Total Votes
Aberavon	Labour	5661	31.0%	567	3.1%	608	3.3%	704	3.9%	4332	23.8%	1292	7.1%			4295	23.5%			782	4.3%	18240
Aberconwy	Conservative	5582	41.9%	479	3.6%	1383	10.4%	1101	8.3%	1556	11.7%	2564	19.2%			134	1.0%			530	4.0%	13329
Aberdeen North	SNP	6253	22.1%	646	2.3%	5446	19.2%	1755	6.2%	2938	10.4%	2455	8.7%	124	0.4%			8160	28.8%	574	2.0%	28350
Aberdeen South	Conservative	2351	10.0%	575	2.4%	1765	7.5%	1939	8.2%	1560	6.6%	6233	26.5%	122	0.5%			8682	36.9%	331	1.4%	23559
Airdrie and Shotts	SNP	2847	12.9%	345	1.6%	2812	12.8%	1003	4.5%	3300	15.0%	1227	5.6%	89	0.4%			9973	45.2%	455	2.1%	22052
Aldershot	Conservative	9432	38.0%	950	3.8%	2750	11.1%	2801	11.3%	2458	9.9%	5382	21.7%	244	1.0%					822	3.3%	24839
Aldridge-Brownhills	Conservative	9426	50.9%	583	3.1%	2448	13.2%	1068	5.8%	1617	8.7%	2060	11.1%							1314	7.1%	18516
Altrincham and Sale West	Conservative	6587	21.6%	1073	3.5%	3136	10.3%	5502	18.1%	3624	11.9%	9297	30.5%	564	1.9%					696	2.3%	30480
Alyn and Deeside	Labour	8494	47.8%	723	4.1%	1747	9.8%	1252	7.1%	1365	7.7%	2816	15.9%			544	3.1%			818	4.6%	17758
Amber Valley	Conservative	10425	44.5%	670	2.9%	2487	10.6%	2222	9.5%	3482	14.9%	2415	10.3%	209	0.9%					1492	6.4%	23402
Angus	Conservative	4496	18.9%	417	1.8%	4503	18.9%	1589	6.7%	1326	5.6%	1909	8.0%	179	0.8%			8872	37.3%	485	2.0%	23775
Arfon	Plaid	3382	27.9%	262	2.2%	523	4.3%	1123	9.3%	1578	13.0%	1281	10.6%			3509	29.0%			449	3.7%	12108
Argyll and Bute	SNP	5450	17.9%	505	1.7%	3985	13.1%	2255	7.4%	1197	3.9%	5019	16.4%	184	0.6%			11366	37.2%	568	1.9%	30529
Arundel and South Downs	Conservative	12231	35.8%	1537	4.5%	3324	9.7%	4735	13.9%	842	2.5%	10598	31.0%	233	0.7%					635	1.9%	34136
Ashfield	Labour	12157	49.9%	1080	4.4%	1530	6.3%	1607	6.6%	3209	13.2%	2223	9.1%	664	2.7%					1892	7.8%	24363
Ashford	Conservative	14959	45.7%	1320	4.0%	3255	10.0%	3958	12.1%	2101	6.4%	6068	18.6%	228	0.7%					810	2.5%	32699
Ashton-under-Lyne	Labour	7011	35.9%	432	2.2%	1080	5.5%	1885	9.7%	5415	27.8%	1634	8.4%	980	5.0%					1075	5.5%	19513
Aylesbury	Conservative	10931	33.2%	1575	4.8%	3400	10.3%	4643	14.1%	3479	10.6%	7838	23.8%	290	0.9%					744	2.3%	32901
Ayr, Carrick and Cumnock	Conservative	4861	17.8%	523	1.9%	5013	18.4%	1566	5.7%	2782	10.2%	2672	9.8%	162	0.6%			9110	33.4%	604	2.2%	27293
Banbury	Conservative	11413	33.2%	1580	4.6%	3771	11.0%	4675	13.6%	2789	8.1%	9017	26.2%	289	0.8%					824	2.4%	34359
Banff and Buchan	Conservative	5259	23.6%	412	1.9%	3227	14.5%	1611	7.2%	1306	5.9%	2203	9.9%	138	0.6%			7397	33.2%	703	3.2%	22256
Barking	Labour	6338	25.8%	604	2.5%	1125	4.6%	1305	5.3%	10915	44.5%	2089	8.5%	1015	4.1%					1139	4.6%	24530
Barnsley Central	Labour	8333	46.6%	425	2.4%	598	3.3%	1502	8.4%	3191	17.9%	1554	8.7%	1227	6.9%					1036	5.8%	17865
Barnsley East	Labour	9310	49.2%	410	2.2%	770	4.1%	1381	7.3%	3085	16.3%	1347	7.1%	1391	7.4%					1216	6.4%	18910
Barrow and Furness	Labour	7647	38.4%	473	2.4%	1920	9.6%	1940	9.7%	2818	14.1%	3572	17.9%	702	3.5%					862	4.3%	19934
Basildon and Billericay	Conservative	10467	49.3%	680	3.2%	2104	9.9%	1733	8.2%	1782	8.4%	3282	15.5%	181	0.9%					1007	4.7%	21237
Basingstoke	Conservative	10593	36.8%	1275	4.4%	3549	12.3%	3311	11.5%	2673	9.3%	6282	21.8%	361	1.3%					767	2.7%	28811
Bassetlaw	Labour	11888	47.4%	686	2.7%	2060	8.2%	1819	7.3%	3749	14.9%	2827	11.3%	219	0.9%					1842	7.3%	25088
Bath	Lib Dem	6209	18.6%	919	2.7%	1602	4.8%	8768	26.2%	1849	5.5%	13167	39.3%	318	1.0%					636	1.9%	33468
Batley and Spen	Labour	9321	36.1%	457	1.8%	1600	6.2%	1994	7.7%	7908	30.6%	2520	9.8%	928	3.6%					1111	4.3%	25838
Battersea	Labour	3416	10.8%	2922	9.3%	957	3.0%	4544	14.4%	5353	17.0%	13155	41.7%	919	2.9%					288	0.9%	31555
Beaconsfield	Conservative	10633	33.7%	1683	5.3%	4290	13.6%	3723	11.8%	1622	5.1%	8834	28.0%	236	0.7%					549	1.7%	31570
Beckenham	Conservative	9448	30.5%	1573	5.1%	3641	11.8%	3624	11.7%	1998	6.5%	9001	29.1%	915	3.0%					743	2.4%	30943
Bedford	Labour	7496	30.4%	882	3.6%	2448	9.9%	3007	12.2%	4419	17.9%	5341	21.7%	275	1.1%					766	3.1%	24633
Bermondsey and Old Southwark	Labour	3742	10.6%	2339	6.6%	1264	3.6%	6032	17.1%	8582	24.4%	11497	32.7%	1202	3.4%					534	1.5%	35192
Berwick-upon-Tweed	Conservative	7839	39.6%	804	4.1%	1950	9.8%	1529	7.7%	2324	11.7%	4430	22.4%							932	4.7%	19808
Berwickshire, Roxburgh and Selkirk	Conservative	6237	19.9%	575	1.8%	6703	21.4%	2435	7.8%	978	3.1%	4586	14.7%	347	1.1%			8854	28.3%	576	1.8%	31292
Bethnal Green and Bow	Labour	3519	9.7%	1603	4.4%	865	2.4%	6568	18.1%	13741	37.8%	8393	23.1%	1126	3.1%					539	1.5%	36353
Beverley and Holderness	Conservative	12576	43.0%	764	2.6%	4708	16.1%	3077	10.5%	1602	5.5%	4828	16.5%	567	1.9%					1102	3.8%	29224
Bexhill and Battle	Conservative	15856	47.3%	1317	3.9%	3211	9.6%	4005	12.0%	1485	4.4%	6474	19.3%	269	0.8%					890	2.7%	33508
Bexleyheath and Crayford	Conservative	10241	42.7%	869	3.6%	2666	11.1%	1853	7.7%	3141	13.1%	3227	13.4%	802	3.3%					1198	5.0%	23996
Birkenhead	Labour	5538	27.7%	480	2.4%	1116	5.6%	2915	14.6%	6407	32.1%	2298	11.5%	548	2.7%					663	3.3%	19965
Birmingham, Edgbaston	Labour	5675	25.1%	784	3.5%	2077	9.2%	3017	13.3%	3729	16.5%	6133	27.1%							1201	5.3%	22617
Birmingham, Erdington	Labour	5253	32.8%	436	2.7%	1225	7.7%	1464	9.1%	5069	31.7%	1784	11.1%							776	4.8%	16006
Birmingham, Hall Green	Labour	3250	12.5%	614	2.4%	1293	5.0%	2613	10.1%	14358	55.4%	3348	12.9%							430	1.7%	25906
Birmingham, Hodge Hill	Labour	3770	16.5%	328	1.4%	620	2.7%	1286	5.6%	14370	63.0%	1753	7.7%							671	2.9%	22797
Birmingham, Ladywood	Labour	2807	10.7%	696	2.6%	838	3.2%	3201	12.2%	14576	55.4%	3561	13.5%							630	2.4%	26308
Birmingham, Northfield	Labour	6930	37.5%	583	3.2%	1479	8.0%	2078	11.2%	3600	19.5%	2916	15.8%							889	4.8%	18475
Birmingham, Perry Barr	Labour	4871	23.0%	450	2.1%	1503	7.1%	1409	6.6%	10169	47.9%	2122	10.0%							698	3.3%	21223
Birmingham, Selly Oak	Labour	6280	25.3%	698	2.8%	1724	7.0%	5474	22.1%	3669	14.8%	5768	23.3%							1184	4.8%	24797
Birmingham, Yardley	Labour	5898	32.7%	457	2.5%	1294	7.2%	1325	7.3%	6291	34.9%	1901	10.5%							883	4.9%	18049
Bishop Auckland	Labour	8521	33.9%	819	3.3%	1305	5.2%	1252	5.0%	9186	36.6%	2819	11.2%							1223	4.9%	25124
Blackburn	Labour	5752	21.3%	345	1.3%	1468	5.4%	1365	5.1%	14430	53.5%	1858	6.9%	1027	3.8%					750	2.8%	26995
Blackley and Broughton	Labour	3530	17.8%	382	1.9%	690	3.5%	1624	8.2%	9945	50.1%	2696	13.6%	455	2.3%					542	2.7%	19864
Blackpool North and Cleveleys	Conservative	9257	46.2%	486	2.4%	2358	11.8%	1584	7.9%	2617	13.1%	1816	9.1%	858	4.3%					1071	5.3%	20047
Blackpool South	Labour	6999	42.1%	398	2.4%	1486	8.9%	1398	8.4%	3213	19.3%	1455	8.8%	820	4.9%					855	5.1%	16625
Blaenau Gwent	Labour	5995	39.5%	475	3.1%	454	3.0%	646	4.3%	3679	24.2%	1058	7.0%			2072	13.6%			806	5.3%	15185
Blaydon	Labour	8517	54.3%	756	4.8%	766	4.9%	12	0.1%	4	0.0%	4377	27.9%							1263	8.0%	15694
Blyth Valley	Labour	8172	43.5%	671	3.6%	1554	8.3%	1000	5.3%	4196	22.3%	2121	11.3%							1066	5.7%	18781
Bognor Regis and Littlehampton	Conservative	13745	50.6%	839	3.1%	2596	9.6%	2850	10.5%	1627	6.0%	4367	16.1%	221	0.8%					939	3.5%	27183
Bolsover	Labour	9751	48.1%	694	3.4%	1329	6.6%	1472	7.3%	3283	16.2%	1995	9.8%	335	1.7%					1418	7.0%	20277
Bolton North East	Labour	7560	32.8%	519	2.3%	1690	7.3%	1969	8.5%	6556	28.4%	2895	12.6%	907	3.9%					967	4.2%	23062
Bolton South East	Labour	7752	33.4%	408	1.8%	1587	6.8%	1194	5.1%	8348	36.0%	1739	7.5%	1029	4.4%					1134	4.9%	23191
Bolton West	Conservative	8945	38.5%	676	2.9%	2413	10.4%	2106	9.1%	3180	13.7%	3984	17.2%	880	3.8%					1023	4.4%	23206
Bootle	Labour	6076	28.1%	459	2.1%	683	3.2%	2133	9.8%	8733	40.3%	2271	10.5%	520	2.4%					780	3.6%	21656
Boston and Skegness	Conservative	13173	56.4%	508	2.2%	2918	12.5%	1185	5.1%	1725	7.4%	1756	7.5%	311	1.3%					1790	7.7%	23368
Bosworth	Conservative	11731	43.5%	683	2.5%	2874	10.7%	2206	8.2%	1609	6.0%	6292	23.3%	167	0.6%					1421	5.3%	26984
Bournemouth East	Conservative	9025	36.4%	884	3.6%	1888	7.6%	4659	18.8%	1944	7.9%	5505	22.2%	64	0.3%					792	3.2%	24761
Bournemouth West	Conservative	10752	42.4%	757	3.0%	1874	7.4%	4280	16.9%	1516	6.0%	4813	19.0%	211	0.8%					1184	4.7%	25388
Bracknell	Conservative	9996	34.9%	1239	4.3%	3964	13.9%	3187	11.1%	1992	7.0%	7380	25.8%	225	0.8%					626	2.2%	28608
Bradford East	Labour	5597	26.3%	287	1.3%	1002	4.7%	1624	7.6%	9303	43.7%	1767	8.3%	866	4.1%					820	3.9%	21266
Bradford South	Labour	7575	40.0%	317	1.7%	1214	6.4%	1627	8.6%	4620	24.4%	1636	8.6%	911	4.8%					1052	5.6%	18953
Bradford West	Labour	4110	16.8%	277	1.1%	1576	6.4%	2083	8.5%	12747	52.1%	2065	8.4%	970	4.0%					617	2.5%	24446
Braintree	Conservative	10556	44.8%	805	3.4%	2087	8.9%	3378	14.3%	1398	5.9%	4236	18.0%	249	1.1%					837	3.6%	23546
Brecon and Radnorshire	Conservative	7765	30.7%	451	1.8%	2009	7.9%	1755	6.9%	1534	6.1%	5929	23.4%			5163	20.4%			688	2.7%	25293
Brent Central	Labour	3388	12.0%	1130	4.0%	2411	8.6%	2344	8.3%	11110	39.5%	5975	21.2%	1180	4.2%					614	2.2%	28152
Brent North	Labour	3552	11.7%	1034	3.4%	3760	12.4%	2432	8.0%	11597	38.2%	6407	21.1%	990	3.3%					577	1.9%	30350
Brentford and Isleworth	Labour	5678	15.8%	2000	5.6%	3295	9.2%	3916	10.9%	8102	22.5%	10980	30.5%	1313	3.7%					669	1.9%	35954
Brentwood and Ongar	Conservative	12488	45.2%	892	3.2%	3208	11.6%	2608	9.4%	1225	4.4%	6108	22.1%	220	0.8%					886	3.2%	27635
Bridgend	Labour	7114	32.1%	818	3.7%	1432	6.5%	1360	6.1%	3264	14.7%	3077	13.9%			4433	20.0%			656	3.0%	22154
Bridgwater and West Somerset	Conservative	13228	45.6%	692	2.4%	2207	7.6%	3636	12.5%	1526	5.3%	6254	21.6%	271	0.9%					1202	4.1%	29017
Brigg and Goole	Conservative	9927	50.0%	552	2.8%	2082	10.5%	1570	7.9%	1935	9.7%	2097	10.6%	549	2.8%					1141	5.7%	19852
Brighton, Kemptown	Labour	7156	25.9%	1104	4.0%	2277	8.3%	7842	28.4%	3580	13.0%	5003	18.1%	180	0.7%					439	1.6%	27580
Brighton, Pavilion	Green	5573	14.1%	1816	4.6%	1365	3.5%	16302	41.2%	4513	11.4%	9244	23.4%	326	0.8%					383	1.0%	39521
Bristol East	Labour	6883	32.1%	531	2.5%	968	4.5%	4658	21.7%	4391	20.5%	3133	14.6%	72	0.3%					783	3.7%	21419
Bristol North West	Labour	6635	19.6%	752	2.2%	1414	4.2%	9845	29.1%	3387	10.0%	10515	31.0%	511	1.5%					821	2.4%	33881
Bristol South	Labour	7870	25.4%	745	2.4%	1143	3.7%	10470	33.8%	4889	15.8%	4812	15.5%	68	0.2%					1007	3.2%	31004
Bristol West	Labour	4682	8.7%	1230	2.3%	3097	5.8%	24154	44.9%	6764	12.6%	13049	24.3%	174	0.3%					586	1.1%	53736
Broadland	Conservative	10823	38.5%	894	3.2%	2736	9.7%	3697	13.2%	1548	5.5%	7156	25.5%	219	0.8%					1023	3.6%	28095
Bromley and Chislehurst	Conservative	8230	29.7%	1407	5.1%	3169	11.4%	3129	11.3%	2478	8.9%	7720	27.8%	881	3.2%					727	2.6%	27741
Bromsgrove	Conservative	10700	39.2%	1146	4.2%	3483	12.8%	3110	11.4%	1849	6.8%	5857	21.5%							1152	4.2%	27297
Broxbourne	Conservative	10551	44.6%	802	3.4%	3134	13.3%	1909	8.1%	2592	11.0%	3550	15.0%	216	0.9%					877	3.7%	23631
Broxtowe	Conservative	9894	34.0%	1413	4.8%	2621	9.0%	4133	14.2%	3278	11.2%	6511	22.3%	210	0.7%					1079	3.7%	29138
Buckingham	Speaker	12484	34.4%	1700	4.7%	4580	12.6%	4780	13.2%	866	2.4%	10841	29.9%	273	0.8%					743	2.0%	36266
Burnley	Labour	8282	39.4%	343	1.6%	983	4.7%	1725	8.2%	5396	25.6%	2046	9.7%	1745	8.3%					521	2.5%	21041
Burton	Conservative	10072	42.2%	904	3.8%	3260	13.7%	1887	7.9%	3277	13.7%	3178	13.3%							1295	5.4%	23873
Bury North	Labour	7277	31.1%	755	3.2%	2306	9.9%	2516	10.8%	5141	22.0%	3870	16.5%	778	3.3%					753	3.2%	23395
Bury South	Labour	8113	31.6%	808	3.1%	2416	9.4%	3042	11.9%	5278	20.6%	4066	15.9%	976	3.8%					951	3.7%	25651
Bury St Edmunds	Conservative	12829	38.4%	1047	3.1%	4413	13.2%	5982	17.9%	1757	5.3%	6152	18.4%	182	0.5%					1037	3.1%	33399
Caerphilly	Labour	7591	44.1%	624	3.6%	783	4.6%	1253	7.3%	3899	22.7%	2156	12.5%			81	0.5%			820	4.8%	17206
Caithness, Sutherland and Easter Ross	Lib Dem	4211	23.0%	275	1.5%	2419	13.2%	1162	6.3%	555	3.0%	2342	12.8%	107	0.6%			6778	37.0%	479	2.6%	18326
Calder Valley	Conservative	10337	36.1%	693	2.4%	2550	8.9%	4734	16.5%	2994	10.4%	5097	17.8%	1303	4.5%					958	3.3%	28666
Camberwell and Peckham	Labour	3855	11.6%	1672	5.0%	1057	3.2%	6318	19.0%	10123	30.5%	8780	26.4%	941	2.8%					495	1.5%	33242
Camborne and Redruth	Conservative	11303	43.2%	588	2.2%	1724	6.6%	4212	16.1%	2094	8.0%	4549	17.4%	562	2.2%					1108	4.2%	26139
Cambridge	Labour	4623	12.6%	1202	3.3%	1317	3.6%	8959	24.3%	4338	11.8%	15802	42.9%	137	0.4%					448	1.2%	36826
Cannock Chase	Conservative	10538	50.3%	605	2.9%	2111	10.1%	1912	9.1%	2373	11.3%	1951	9.3%							1468	7.0%	20958
Canterbury	Labour	11447	32.0%	1386	3.9%	2984	8.3%	5680	15.9%	3093	8.6%	10285	28.7%	238	0.7%					677	1.9%	35790
Cardiff Central	Labour	4947	22.9%	679	3.1%	1364	6.3%	3650	16.9%	3903	18.1%	6327	29.3%							712	3.3%	21582
Cardiff North	Labour	6857	31.0%	991	4.5%	2389	10.8%	1799	8.1%	2539	11.5%	6513	29.5%			414	1.9%			588	2.7%	22090
Cardiff South and Penarth	Labour	6426	15.0%	1039	2.4%	1692	3.9%	2291	5.3%	6731	15.7%	4439	10.4%			19633	45.8%			600	1.4%	42850
Cardiff West	Labour	5409	25.9%	904	4.3%	1686	8.1%	1689	8.1%	4975	23.8%	5736	27.5%							467	2.2%	20866
Carlisle	Conservative	8122	38.4%	544	2.6%	2274	10.8%	2475	11.7%	2892	13.7%	3027	14.3%	838	4.0%					964	4.6%	21137
Carmarthen East and Dinefwr	Plaid	8007	50.1%	582	3.6%	1251	7.8%	1188	7.4%	2215	13.9%	1991	12.5%							740	4.6%	15974
Carmarthen West and Pembrokeshire South	Conservative	8750	45.5%	573	3.0%	2075	10.8%	1433	7.5%	2359	12.3%	2552	13.3%			671	3.5%			799	4.2%	19211
Carshalton and Wallington	Lib Dem	8509	31.5%	957	3.5%	2102	7.8%	2329	8.6%	2916	10.8%	8223	30.5%	982	3.6%					972	3.6%	26990
Castle Point	Conservative	12821	58.7%	662	3.0%	2122	9.7%	1517	6.9%	1237	5.7%	2123	9.7%	183	0.8%					1194	5.5%	21859
Central Ayrshire	SNP	4301	17.6%	495	2.0%	4295	17.6%	1338	5.5%	2046	8.4%	1820	7.4%	166	0.7%			9477	38.7%	526	2.2%	24463
Central Devon	Conservative	12364	38.4%	915	2.8%	2626	8.1%	6214	19.3%	1117	3.5%	7798	24.2%	270	0.8%					935	2.9%	32239
Central Suffolk and North Ipswich	Conservative	11351	39.6%	894	3.1%	3035	10.6%	4726	16.5%	1580	5.5%	5877	20.5%	250	0.9%					955	3.3%	28668
Ceredigion	Plaid	6471	27.0%	328	1.4%	896	3.7%	1638	6.8%	1231	5.1%	3915	16.3%			8908	37.2%			578	2.4%	23965
Charnwood	Conservative	12541	41.2%	937	3.1%	6678	22.0%	2263	7.4%	2496	8.2%	4416	14.5%	79	0.3%					996	3.3%	30406
Chatham and Aylesford	Conservative	11350	51.8%	790	3.6%	2094	9.6%	2258	10.3%	1295	5.9%	3166	14.5%	156	0.7%					793	3.6%	21902
Cheadle	Conservative	7259	26.0%	982	3.5%	2163	7.8%	3770	13.5%	2398	8.6%	10100	36.2%	594	2.1%					631	2.3%	27897
Chelmsford	Conservative	10597	37.5%	970	3.4%	2512	8.9%	3150	11.2%	1642	5.8%	8413	29.8%	162	0.6%					781	2.8%	28228
Chelsea and Fulham	Conservative	4604	16.0%	1918	6.7%	3597	12.5%	2679	9.3%	4119	14.3%	10665	37.0%	816	2.8%					400	1.4%	28799
Cheltenham	Conservative	9070	26.5%	1039	3.0%	3358	9.8%	5919	17.3%	1514	4.4%	12378	36.2%	231	0.7%					696	2.0%	34206
Chesham and Amersham	Conservative	10319	30.0%	1881	5.5%	4381	12.8%	4597	13.4%	1496	4.4%	10942	31.9%	241	0.7%					496	1.4%	34353
Chesterfield	Labour	8742	38.7%	745	3.3%	1313	5.8%	2338	10.4%	3716	16.5%	4316	19.1%	192	0.9%					1226	5.4%	22588
Chichester	Conservative	12715	37.4%	1292	3.8%	3928	11.6%	4846	14.3%	1082	3.2%	9195	27.0%	221	0.7%					720	2.1%	34000
Chingford and Woodford Green	Conservative	6600	27.9%	1268	5.4%	2359	10.0%	2765	11.7%	3622	15.3%	5582	23.6%	833	3.5%					649	2.7%	23678
Chippenham	Conservative	10888	34.1%	990	3.1%	2132	6.7%	6065	19.0%	1613	5.1%	8918	28.0%	267	0.8%					1016	3.2%	31888
Chipping Barnet	Conservative	6762	21.8%	2365	7.6%	4911	15.8%	2978	9.6%	4169	13.4%	8297	26.7%	980	3.2%					573	1.8%	31036
Chorley	Labour	10278	37.4%	890	3.2%	2955	10.8%	3042	11.1%	4483	16.3%	4073	14.8%	767	2.8%					976	3.6%	27464
Christchurch	Conservative	13998	51.7%	677	2.5%	2571	9.5%	2808	10.4%	823	3.0%	4865	18.0%	167	0.6%					1149	4.2%	27059
Cities of London and Westminster	Conservative	4149	14.6%	1942	6.8%	3144	11.0%	3126	11.0%	3894	13.7%	10537	37.0%	1301	4.6%					375	1.3%	28467
City of Chester	Labour	7470	25.9%	887	3.1%	2465	8.5%	5463	18.9%	3623	12.5%	7284	25.2%	943	3.3%					745	2.6%	28881
City of Durham	Labour	7963	29.3%	1167	4.3%	1353	5.0%	4237	15.6%	2920	10.8%	7874	29.0%							1631	6.0%	27144
Clacton	Conservative	15016	57.5%	590	2.3%	2341	9.0%	2012	7.7%	1746	6.7%	2498	9.6%	310	1.2%					1585	6.1%	26098
Cleethorpes	Conservative	11704	53.7%	612	2.8%	2582	11.8%	1489	6.8%	1544	7.1%	2005	9.2%	437	2.0%					1425	6.5%	21798
Clwyd South	Labour	6667	44.7%	674	4.5%	1312	8.8%	993	6.7%	2499	16.8%	2168	14.5%							606	4.1%	14918
Clwyd West	Conservative	7998	27.3%	622	2.1%	2139	7.3%	1266	4.3%	2216	7.6%	2808	9.6%			11536	39.3%			763	2.6%	29347
Coatbridge, Chryston and Bellshill	Labour	3309	15.6%	411	1.9%	1358	6.4%	1005	4.7%	2956	14.0%	1577	7.4%	107	0.5%			9945	47.0%	500	2.4%	21168
Colchester	Conservative	9046	33.3%	998	3.7%	2418	8.9%	4631	17.0%	2673	9.8%	6481	23.8%	168	0.6%					768	2.8%	27184
Colne Valley	Labour	9786	34.8%	680	2.4%	2086	7.4%	3856	13.7%	4600	16.4%	5366	19.1%	754	2.7%					962	3.4%	28089
Congleton	Conservative	9579	38.1%	971	3.9%	2871	11.4%	3123	12.4%	2083	8.3%	5122	20.4%	546	2.2%					828	3.3%	25122
Copeland	Conservative	7569	36.7%	738	3.6%	2184	10.6%	1916	9.3%	2965	14.4%	3728	18.1%	704	3.4%					815	4.0%	20619
Corby	Conservative	13943	40.4%	1177	3.4%	4622	13.4%	2923	8.5%	4347	12.6%	5759	16.7%	267	0.8%					1504	4.4%	34543
The Cotswolds	Conservative	11743	33.4%	1075	3.1%	4264	12.1%	5640	16.1%	1033	2.9%	10306	29.3%	244	0.7%					827	2.4%	35132
Coventry North East	Labour	6194	29.5%	589	2.8%	1296	6.2%	1702	8.1%	8039	38.3%	2216	10.5%							969	4.6%	21005
Coventry North West	Labour	7906	37.3%	683	3.2%	1849	8.7%	2369	11.2%	4533	21.4%	2817	13.3%							1041	4.9%	21197
Coventry South	Labour	7160	29.4%	746	3.1%	1937	8.0%	3749	15.4%	4419	18.2%	5048	20.8%							1259	5.2%	24318
Crawley	Conservative	9493	37.7%	887	3.5%	2721	10.8%	2367	9.4%	4728	18.8%	4128	16.4%	234	0.9%					628	2.5%	25186
Crewe and Nantwich	Labour	11072	39.3%	906	3.2%	3026	10.7%	3017	10.7%	3675	13.0%	4378	15.5%	916	3.2%					1213	4.3%	28203
Croydon Central	Labour	6895	23.8%	1426	4.9%	3163	10.9%	3187	11.0%	5850	20.2%	6360	21.9%	1222	4.2%					895	3.1%	28997
Croydon North	Labour	5329	15.3%	1438	4.1%	3225	9.2%	3939	11.3%	12807	36.7%	6069	17.4%	1383	4.0%					739	2.1%	34930
Croydon South	Conservative	8504	26.5%	1772	5.5%	3751	11.7%	3503	10.9%	3717	11.6%	8860	27.6%	1196	3.7%					846	2.6%	32149
Cumbernauld, Kilsyth and Kirkintilloch East	SNP	3365	13.4%	425	1.7%	1475	5.9%	1713	6.8%	5116	20.4%	2151	8.6%	105	0.4%			10230	40.9%	455	1.8%	25035
Cynon Valley	Labour	5263	43.9%	391	3.3%	506	4.2%	674	5.6%	3548	29.6%	1019	8.5%			13	0.1%			585	4.9%	11999
Dagenham and Rainham	Labour	10008	41.7%	608	2.5%	1826	7.6%	1272	5.3%	5829	24.3%	2020	8.4%	972	4.1%					1453	6.1%	23988
Darlington	Labour	8264	40.5%	692	3.4%	2082	10.2%	1936	9.5%	3224	15.8%	3208	15.7%							1003	4.9%	20409
Dartford	Conservative	12837	47.2%	1017	3.7%	2883	10.6%	2270	8.4%	3295	12.1%	3737	13.7%	213	0.8%					931	3.4%	27183
Daventry	Conservative	12595	39.8%	1396	4.4%	4368	13.8%	3539	11.2%	1745	5.5%	6442	20.4%	254	0.8%					1274	4.0%	31614
Delyn	Labour	7119	36.8%	663	3.4%	1513	7.8%	1327	6.9%	1063	5.5%	3128	16.2%			3852	19.9%			665	3.4%	19331
Denton and Reddish	Labour	7620	38.3%	506	2.5%	1446	7.3%	2165	10.9%	4030	20.3%	2190	11.0%	837	4.2%					1078	5.4%	19873
Derby North	Labour	7702	33.4%	677	2.9%	2273	9.9%	2711	11.8%	2604	11.3%	5149	22.3%	196	0.9%					1737	7.5%	23050
Derby South	Labour	6404	30.8%	508	2.4%	1560	7.5%	1293	6.2%	6594	31.7%	2749	13.2%	146	0.7%					1555	7.5%	20810
Derbyshire Dales	Conservative	9597	33.8%	1016	3.6%	3613	12.7%	4216	14.8%	1789	6.3%	6974	24.6%	163	0.6%					1027	3.6%	28395
Devizes	Conservative	13944	35.3%	1164	2.9%	9240	23.4%	4840	12.2%	1155	2.9%	7733	19.6%	363	0.9%					1093	2.8%	39532
Dewsbury	Labour	9945	34.4%	555	1.9%	1793	6.2%	2388	8.3%	7004	24.2%	3885	13.4%	2200	7.6%					1167	4.0%	28936
Don Valley	Labour	10219	44.4%	534	2.3%	1376	6.0%	1760	7.6%	4028	17.5%	2261	9.8%	1603	7.0%					1255	5.4%	23037
Doncaster Central	Labour	9525	42.7%	555	2.5%	1423	6.4%	1669	7.5%	4187	18.8%	1982	8.9%	1774	7.9%					1209	5.4%	22324
Doncaster North	Labour	10271	48.2%	476	2.2%	1323	6.2%	1469	6.9%	3178	14.9%	1665	7.8%	1539	7.2%					1398	6.6%	21320
Dover	Conservative	13742	47.5%	983	3.4%	2541	8.8%	3338	11.5%	2849	9.8%	4589	15.8%	234	0.8%					684	2.4%	28960
Dudley North	Labour	8613	48.6%	432	2.4%	1919	10.8%	1039	5.9%	2941	16.6%	1568	8.8%							1208	6.8%	17722
Dudley South	Conservative	8776	48.5%	443	2.4%	1736	9.6%	1215	6.7%	3001	16.6%	1741	9.6%							1182	6.5%	18094
Dulwich and West Norwood	Labour	3461	9.9%	2336	6.7%	1386	4.0%	6737	19.3%	6564	18.8%	13214	37.9%	862	2.5%					332	1.0%	34894
Dumfries and Galloway	Conservative	6142	20.7%	581	2.0%	5547	18.7%	2280	7.7%	2484	8.4%	3089	10.4%	194	0.7%			8632	29.1%	741	2.5%	29690
Dumfriesshire, Clydesdale and Tweeddale	Conservative	5903	21.2%	571	2.0%	6466	23.2%	1611	5.8%	1050	3.8%	4268	15.3%	195	0.7%			7143	25.6%	685	2.5%	27891
Dundee East	SNP	1585	6.9%	342	1.5%	1068	4.7%	1654	7.2%	2216	9.7%	3312	14.5%	141	0.6%			12270	53.6%	306	1.3%	22893
Dundee West	SNP	5380	22.5%	428	1.8%	3191	13.4%	1461	6.1%	2116	8.9%	1764	7.4%	125	0.5%			8931	37.4%	464	1.9%	23860
Dunfermline and West Fife	SNP	894	3.7%	437	1.8%	2	0.0%	2783	11.4%	4495	18.4%	2897	11.9%	154	0.6%			12294	50.4%	454	1.9%	24410
Dwyfor Meirionnydd	Plaid	4504	19.3%	251	1.1%	812	3.5%	703	3.0%	1183	5.1%	963	4.1%			14500	62.1%			417	1.8%	23332
Ealing Central and Acton	Labour	4209	11.0%	2548	6.7%	3010	7.9%	4950	13.0%	7566	19.9%	13960	36.6%	1374	3.6%					477	1.3%	38094
Ealing North	Labour	5451	17.7%	1325	4.3%	2761	9.0%	2234	7.3%	10364	33.7%	6282	20.4%	1561	5.1%					795	2.6%	30773
Ealing, Southall	Labour	3198	10.5%	1088	3.6%	1645	5.4%	3335	11.0%	13951	46.0%	5633	18.6%	993	3.3%					473	1.6%	30316
Easington	Labour	8857	47.6%	682	3.7%	1422	7.6%	864	4.6%	3504	18.8%	1720	9.3%							1545	8.3%	18594
East Devon	Conservative	13106	36.6%	1177	3.3%	3109	8.7%	7117	19.9%	1491	4.2%	8439	23.6%	373	1.0%					956	2.7%	35768
East Dunbartonshire	Lib Dem	3917	12.5%	599	1.9%	3643	11.6%	2371	7.5%	1239	3.9%	8965	28.5%	158	0.5%			10171	32.4%	343	1.1%	31407
East Ham	Labour	3462	10.2%	928	2.7%	1550	4.6%	2614	7.7%	19426	57.4%	4192	12.4%	1048	3.1%					628	1.9%	33847
East Hampshire	Conservative	11609	35.2%	1321	4.0%	4080	12.4%	4539	13.8%	1063	3.2%	9539	28.9%	237	0.7%					615	1.9%	33003
East Kilbride, Strathaven and Lesmahagow	SNP	4211	15.6%	609	2.3%	1278	4.7%	1603	5.9%	3226	12.0%	3419	12.7%	162	0.6%			11954	44.3%	534	2.0%	26995
East Lothian	Labour	4481	13.3%	679	2.0%	4635	13.8%	3095	9.2%	3986	11.9%	5079	15.1%	133	0.4%			10992	32.7%	532	1.6%	33612
East Renfrewshire	Conservative	4016	11.9%	995	2.9%	5898	17.4%	2560	7.6%	2834	8.4%	5487	16.2%	234	0.7%			11366	33.6%	416	1.2%	33806
East Surrey	Conservative	12700	39.8%	1546	4.8%	3699	11.6%	3573	11.2%	1341	4.2%	7992	25.1%	237	0.7%					816	2.6%	31903
East Worthing and Shoreham	Conservative	10572	36.1%	1291	4.4%	2901	9.9%	4883	16.7%	2771	9.5%	5917	20.2%	211	0.7%					713	2.4%	29259
East Yorkshire	Conservative	12013	50.1%	615	2.6%	2030	8.5%	2230	9.3%	1946	8.1%	3169	13.2%	720	3.0%					1257	5.2%	23979
Eastbourne	Lib Dem	13184	42.8%	842	2.7%	2859	9.3%	3474	11.3%	1605	5.2%	7920	25.7%	224	0.7%					726	2.4%	30833
Eastleigh	Conservative	11568	41.1%	1046	3.7%	2351	8.4%	3058	10.9%	1395	5.0%	7705	27.4%	210	0.7%					779	2.8%	28113
Eddisbury	Conservative	8632	35.1%	805	3.3%	2728	11.1%	3047	12.4%	2814	11.4%	5392	21.9%	433	1.8%					751	3.1%	24602
Edinburgh East	SNP	13842	24.5%	778	1.4%	16937	29.9%	8252	14.6%	1950	3.4%	2632	4.7%	102	0.2%			11539	20.4%	552	1.0%	56583
Edinburgh North and Leith	SNP	193	0.6%	723	2.1%	1	0.0%	6596	18.9%	2457	7.1%	7445	21.4%	88	0.3%			17071	49.0%	276	0.8%	34850
Edinburgh South	Labour	1427	4.2%	754	2.2%	273	0.8%	2848	8.5%	1611	4.8%	18322	54.6%	87	0.3%			7929	23.6%	336	1.0%	33586
Edinburgh South West	SNP	486	1.8%	586	2.2%	11	0.0%	4164	15.6%	4779	17.9%	4729	17.7%	123	0.5%			11481	43.0%	362	1.4%	26720
Edinburgh West	Lib Dem	214	1.0%	428	2.1%			2008	9.8%	1454	7.1%	6482	31.7%	125	0.6%			9412	46.0%	339	1.7%	20462
Edmonton	Labour	4109	17.1%	843	3.5%	1612	6.7%	1834	7.6%	10844	45.1%	3306	13.7%	916	3.8%					593	2.5%	24057
Ellesmere Port and Neston	Labour	8676	38.5%	644	2.9%	2452	10.9%	2276	10.1%	3465	15.4%	3847	17.1%	366	1.6%					807	3.6%	22532
Elmet and Rothwell	Conservative	9710	39.0%	721	2.9%	2683	10.8%	1913	7.7%	4023	16.2%	4740	19.1%	254	1.0%					825	3.3%	24870
Eltham	Labour	8112	30.2%	1283	4.8%	1709	6.4%	2711	10.1%	4505	16.8%	5624	20.9%	1851	6.9%					1089	4.1%	26883
Enfield North	Labour	5431	22.2%	1102	4.5%	1817	7.4%	2806	11.5%	7111	29.1%	4608	18.9%	856	3.5%					683	2.8%	24415
Enfield, Southgate	Labour	5111	19.0%	1542	5.7%	3072	11.4%	3124	11.6%	4887	18.2%	7802	29.0%	872	3.2%					510	1.9%	26919
Epping Forest	Conservative	11450	42.6%	944	3.5%	3279	12.2%	2967	11.0%	1948	7.2%	5239	19.5%	188	0.7%					854	3.2%	26869
Epsom and Ewell	Conservative	10936	33.0%	1781	5.4%	3257	9.8%	3738	11.3%	1677	5.1%	10921	33.0%	243	0.7%					551	1.7%	33104
Erewash	Conservative	9758	41.3%	717	3.0%	2741	11.6%	2311	9.8%	3357	14.2%	3245	13.7%	203	0.9%					1282	5.4%	23614
Erith and Thamesmead	Labour	7071	26.3%	1053	3.9%	2049	7.6%	2549	9.5%	8282	30.8%	4188	15.6%	804	3.0%					931	3.5%	26928
Esher and Walton	Conservative	9956	28.4%	1829	5.2%	4233	12.1%	3669	10.4%	1302	3.7%	13377	38.1%	281	0.8%					469	1.3%	35115
Exeter	Labour	8805	27.9%	940	3.0%	1790	5.7%	8934	28.3%	3972	12.6%	6060	19.2%	207	0.7%					879	2.8%	31587
Falkirk	SNP	5266	20.2%	759	2.9%	3486	13.4%	1101	4.2%	153	0.6%	2916	11.2%	212	0.8%			11551	44.3%	648	2.5%	26092
Fareham	Conservative	13470	43.3%	1187	3.8%	3464	11.1%	3538	11.4%	1316	4.2%	7087	22.8%	271	0.9%					776	2.5%	31109
Faversham and Mid Kent	Conservative	12039	44.6%	959	3.6%	2595	9.6%	3110	11.5%	1322	4.9%	6108	22.6%	183	0.7%					683	2.5%	26999
Feltham and Heston	Labour	6303	21.4%	965	3.3%	2349	8.0%	1946	6.6%	11657	39.5%	4115	13.9%	1179	4.0%					995	3.4%	29508
Filton and Bradley Stoke	Conservative	9165	33.6%	801	2.9%	2729	10.0%	4286	15.7%	2008	7.4%	6965	25.5%	430	1.6%					895	3.3%	27278
Finchley and Golders Green	Conservative	4940	13.8%	3048	8.5%	4625	12.9%	4289	12.0%	5290	14.8%	12056	33.7%	1094	3.1%					461	1.3%	35803
Folkestone and Hythe	Conservative	16456	48.0%	1111	3.2%	2770	8.1%	5236	15.3%	1976	5.8%	5535	16.1%	262	0.8%					934	2.7%	34280
Forest of Dean	Conservative	11054	41.3%	739	2.8%	2492	9.3%	4706	17.6%	1857	6.9%	4703	17.6%	262	1.0%					934	3.5%	26746
Fylde	Conservative	9872	41.4%	874	3.7%	3101	13.0%	2646	11.1%	1745	7.3%	4106	17.2%	665	2.8%					815	3.4%	23825
Gainsborough	Conservative	11736	45.5%	764	3.0%	3333	12.9%	2271	8.8%	1552	6.0%	4663	18.1%	315	1.2%					1164	4.5%	25798
Garston and Halewood	Labour	4402	25.1%	529	3.0%	576	3.3%	2181	12.4%	5881	33.5%	3272	18.6%	277	1.6%					446	2.5%	17564
Gateshead	Labour	7540	25.3%	728	2.4%	1423	4.8%	3882	13.0%	11307	37.9%	3642	12.2%							1276	4.3%	29798
Gedling	Labour	9413	37.2%	912	3.6%	2171	8.6%	3117	12.3%	4208	16.6%	4054	16.0%	205	0.8%					1243	4.9%	25322
Gillingham and Rainham	Conservative	11813	53.1%	733	3.3%	2151	9.7%	2159	9.7%	878	3.9%	3374	15.2%	269	1.2%					872	3.9%	22250
Glasgow Central	SNP	1418	6.5%	626	2.9%	49	0.2%	6875	31.7%	2963	13.6%	1831	8.4%	65	0.3%			7503	34.6%	380	1.8%	21709
Glasgow East	SNP	96	0.5%	172	0.9%	5	0.0%	1416	7.5%	3860	20.5%	596	3.2%	110	0.6%			12162	64.6%	419	2.2%	18834
Glasgow North	SNP	13482	36.1%	711	1.9%	9651	25.8%	1822	4.9%	1497	4.0%	3764	10.1%	47	0.1%			6065	16.2%	350	0.9%	37389
Glasgow North East	Labour	75	0.4%	182	1.0%			1629	8.8%	3912	21.2%	681	3.7%	93	0.5%			11468	62.2%	391	2.1%	18431
Glasgow North West	SNP	87	0.4%	329	1.4%			2736	11.3%	3887	16.0%	4450	18.3%	95	0.4%			12400	51.0%	322	1.3%	24305
Glasgow South	SNP	64	0.3%	333	1.7%			2493	13.1%	2966	15.6%	2371	12.5%	85	0.4%			10436	54.8%	281	1.5%	19029
Glasgow South West	SNP	68	0.4%	163	1.0%			1896	11.9%	4346	27.4%	686	4.3%	98	0.6%			8266	52.1%	354	2.2%	15878
Glenrothes	SNP	824	5.6%	266	1.8%	1	0.0%	1030	7.0%	2387	16.1%	1848	12.5%	115	0.8%			7868	53.1%	478	3.2%	14817
Gloucester	Conservative	10244	38.1%	711	2.6%	2647	9.8%	3465	12.9%	3434	12.8%	5109	19.0%	276	1.0%					1026	3.8%	26911
Gordon	Conservative	4674	17.6%	608	2.3%	4756	17.9%	1418	5.3%	697	2.6%	4105	15.4%	156	0.6%			9658	36.3%	548	2.1%	26619
Gosport	Conservative	13096	48.9%	846	3.2%	3021	11.3%	2747	10.3%	1362	5.1%	4607	17.2%	222	0.8%					866	3.2%	26767
Gower	Labour	7065	38.7%	777	4.3%	1550	8.5%	1368	7.5%	2620	14.4%	4348	23.8%			9	0.0%			518	2.8%	18255
Grantham and Stamford	Conservative	12387	42.4%	1119	3.8%	3975	13.6%	2829	9.7%	1914	6.5%	5064	17.3%	545	1.9%					1409	4.8%	29244
Gravesham	Conservative	11491	45.4%	829	3.3%	2512	9.9%	2234	8.8%	3881	15.3%	3228	12.8%	224	0.9%					913	3.6%	25312
Great Grimsby	Labour	7929	49.0%	413	2.6%	1263	7.8%	1349	8.3%	2341	14.5%	1463	9.0%	289	1.8%					1124	7.0%	16171
Great Yarmouth	Conservative	11552	53.0%	562	2.6%	2114	9.7%	1748	8.0%	2236	10.3%	2079	9.5%	230	1.1%					1267	5.8%	21788
Greenwich and Woolwich	Labour	4091	13.3%	2140	6.9%	1594	5.2%	5009	16.3%	7879	25.6%	8946	29.1%	623	2.0%					511	1.7%	30794
Guildford	Conservative	8789	26.4%	1724	5.2%	2896	8.7%	5078	15.2%	1291	3.9%	12771	38.3%	293	0.9%					468	1.4%	33310
Hackney North and Stoke Newington	Labour	2090	5.7%	1940	5.3%	983	2.7%	8503	23.2%	12422	33.9%	9192	25.1%	1159	3.2%					352	1.0%	36641
Hackney South and Shoreditch	Labour	2007	6.4%	1729	5.5%	1126	3.6%	7200	22.9%	11403	36.3%	6774	21.6%	813	2.6%					334	1.1%	31386
Halesowen and Rowley Regis	Conservative	9066	46.5%	513	2.6%	1870	9.6%	1529	7.8%	3249	16.7%	2072	10.6%							1203	6.2%	19501
Halifax	Labour	8501	35.0%	418	1.7%	1711	7.1%	2168	8.9%	6730	27.7%	2396	9.9%	1380	5.7%					950	3.9%	24254
Haltemprice and Howden	Conservative	10071	38.7%	739	2.8%	2074	8.0%	2537	9.8%	1301	5.0%	4899	18.8%	3367	13.0%					1010	3.9%	25998
Halton	Labour	6686	34.9%	472	2.5%	799	4.2%	2022	10.6%	5216	27.2%	2419	12.6%	689	3.6%					843	4.4%	19146
Hammersmith	Labour	4395	13.9%	2005	6.3%	2636	8.3%	3971	12.5%	6843	21.6%	10261	32.4%	1075	3.4%					502	1.6%	31687
Hampstead and Kilburn	Labour	3470	9.6%	2636	7.3%	2339	6.5%	4991	13.8%	7798	21.6%	13946	38.6%	658	1.8%					334	0.9%	36173
Harborough	Conservative	9654	34.0%	928	3.3%	3646	12.8%	3120	11.0%	2747	9.7%	7066	24.9%	178	0.6%					1075	3.8%	28414
Harlow	Conservative	9303	44.8%	609	2.9%	1987	9.6%	1824	8.8%	3183	15.3%	2670	12.9%	190	0.9%					1005	4.8%	20771
Harrogate and Knaresborough	Conservative	9820	30.0%	1091	3.3%	3901	11.9%	4579	14.0%	1691	5.2%	9209	28.2%	1485	4.5%					918	2.8%	32693
Harrow East	Conservative	5266	20.1%	1153	4.4%	4083	15.6%	1639	6.2%	7455	28.4%	4688	17.9%	1313	5.0%					648	2.5%	26244
Harrow West	Labour	4689	16.5%	1430	5.0%	3893	13.7%	2764	9.8%	7859	27.7%	5939	21.0%	1211	4.3%					556	2.0%	28342
Hartlepool	Labour	9446	52.7%	793	4.4%	910	5.1%	980	5.5%	2465	13.8%	1729	9.7%							1586	8.9%	17909
Harwich and North Essex	Conservative	10824	43.6%	893	3.6%	1966	7.9%	2938	11.8%	1172	4.7%	5855	23.6%	237	1.0%					945	3.8%	24829
Hastings and Rye	Conservative	11768	38.8%	953	3.1%	2110	7.0%	5167	17.0%	3680	12.1%	5657	18.7%	230	0.8%					752	2.5%	30315
Havant	Conservative	11026	45.6%	719	3.0%	2683	11.1%	2587	10.7%	1145	4.7%	4934	20.4%	188	0.8%					902	3.7%	24184
Hayes and Harlington	Labour	5043	20.7%	798	3.3%	2086	8.6%	1624	6.7%	10573	43.5%	2911	12.0%	515	2.1%					778	3.2%	24326
Hazel Grove	Conservative	7400	33.5%	727	3.3%	1547	7.0%	2685	12.1%	2096	9.5%	6325	28.6%	579	2.6%					747	3.4%	22106
Hemel Hempstead	Conservative	9056	36.5%	835	3.4%	2911	11.7%	2478	10.0%	2285	9.2%	6249	25.2%	191	0.8%					829	3.3%	24833
Hemsworth	Labour	9629	44.0%	454	2.1%	1132	5.2%	1727	7.9%	3477	15.9%	2615	11.9%	1573	7.2%					1280	5.8%	21887
Hendon	Conservative	5387	18.1%	2078	7.0%	4332	14.6%	2494	8.4%	6521	21.9%	7070	23.8%	1239	4.2%					589	2.0%	29710
Henley	Conservative	9942	27.9%	1729	4.9%	3895	10.9%	5390	15.1%	1042	2.9%	12802	36.0%	248	0.7%					533	1.5%	35581
Hereford and South Herefordshire	Conservative	10936	40.8%	1095	4.1%	2805	10.5%	4158	15.5%	1517	5.7%	4911	18.3%							1353	5.1%	26775
Hertford and Stortford	Conservative	10752	32.7%	1278	3.9%	3955	12.0%	5368	16.3%	1903	5.8%	8632	26.2%	237	0.7%					805	2.4%	32929
Hertsmere	Conservative	8145	30.9%	1575	6.0%	4673	17.7%	2559	9.7%	2443	9.3%	6062	23.0%	213	0.8%					724	2.7%	26394
Hexham	Conservative	7572	31.6%	1071	4.5%	2468	10.3%	2226	9.3%	1492	6.2%	8321	34.8%							789	3.3%	23939
Heywood and Middleton	Labour	8952	38.3%	483	2.1%	1584	6.8%	2037	8.7%	4600	19.7%	2945	12.6%	1335	5.7%					1417	6.1%	23352
High Peak	Labour	8946	31.9%	911	3.2%	2310	8.2%	4616	16.4%	3981	14.2%	6058	21.6%	164	0.6%					1089	3.9%	28075
Hitchin and Harpenden	Conservative	8151	22.8%	1543	4.3%	3568	10.0%	4935	13.8%	2086	5.8%	14686	41.0%	224	0.6%					593	1.7%	35784
Holborn and St Pancras	Labour	3954	11.1%	1992	5.6%	1517	4.3%	6213	17.5%	8623	24.3%	11448	32.3%	1268	3.6%					477	1.3%	35492
Hornchurch and Upminster	Conservative	14586	48.6%	929	3.1%	3101	10.3%	2011	6.7%	2833	9.4%	3869	12.9%	1090	3.6%					1587	5.3%	30006
Hornsey and Wood Green	Labour	2983	6.4%	2842	6.1%	1500	3.2%	10914	23.5%	9122	19.6%	17891	38.5%	891	1.9%					315	0.7%	46458
Horsham	Conservative	12805	35.9%	1778	5.0%	5491	15.4%	4397	12.3%	1423	4.0%	8866	24.8%	244	0.7%					677	1.9%	35681
Houghton and Sunderland South	Labour	9108	44.7%	744	3.7%	1511	7.4%	1239	6.1%	3571	17.5%	2124	10.4%							2076	10.2%	20374
Hove	Labour	5961	19.7%	1770	5.9%	1823	6.0%	9133	30.2%	4269	14.1%	6911	22.9%	73	0.2%					286	0.9%	30227
Huddersfield	Labour	6792	30.8%	412	1.9%	1341	6.1%	2697	12.2%	5923	26.9%	3075	14.0%	957	4.3%					836	3.8%	22032
Huntingdon	Conservative	11770	36.0%	1505	4.6%	3849	11.8%	4308	13.2%	2113	6.5%	7777	23.8%	267	0.8%					1086	3.3%	32674
Hyndburn	Labour	8495	38.7%	438	2.0%	1823	8.3%	1722	7.8%	5491	25.0%	1866	8.5%	972	4.4%					1162	5.3%	21969
Ilford North	Labour	6316	26.0%	1070	4.4%	2877	11.8%	1809	7.4%	6132	25.2%	4278	17.6%	1079	4.4%					724	3.0%	24286
Ilford South	Labour	4300	13.5%	1042	3.3%	2234	7.0%	2383	7.5%	15890	49.8%	4516	14.2%	955	3.0%					575	1.8%	31895
Inverclyde	SNP	3207	14.6%	425	1.9%	2054	9.3%	1136	5.2%	3236	14.7%	2225	10.1%	127	0.6%			9237	41.9%	384	1.7%	22031
Inverness, Nairn, Badenoch and Strathspey	SNP	5451	15.6%	531	1.5%	3169	9.1%	3913	11.2%	2121	6.1%	5588	16.0%	171	0.5%			13337	38.2%	659	1.9%	34939
Ipswich	Labour	8929	34.7%	696	2.7%	2223	8.6%	3595	14.0%	4451	17.3%	4660	18.1%	216	0.8%					940	3.7%	25710
Isle of Wight	Conservative	19392	46.7%	1107	2.7%	3577	8.6%	6855	16.5%	2481	6.0%	6557	15.8%	290	0.7%					1292	3.1%	41551
Islington North	Labour	3131	9.3%	1960	5.8%	725	2.1%	6943	20.5%	10470	30.9%	9450	27.9%	759	2.2%					407	1.2%	33846
Islington South and Finsbury	Labour	3377	10.3%	1811	5.5%	907	2.8%	6104	18.6%	8547	26.0%	10440	31.8%	1120	3.4%					506	1.5%	32811
Islwyn	Labour	6782	30.8%	485	2.2%	663	3.0%	932	4.2%	3409	15.5%	1485	6.7%			7467	33.9%			812	3.7%	22035
Jarrow	Labour	8501	44.1%	828	4.3%	989	5.1%	1813	9.4%	3290	17.1%	2470	12.8%							1364	7.1%	19255
Keighley	Labour	8002	33.2%	475	2.0%	1773	7.4%	3177	13.2%	3739	15.5%	5159	21.4%	921	3.8%					863	3.6%	24108
Kenilworth and Southam	Conservative	8638	30.5%	1254	4.4%	2891	10.2%	4254	15.0%	1194	4.2%	9252	32.6%							856	3.0%	28338
Kensington	Labour	3901	16.5%	1605	6.8%	2779	11.7%	2203	9.3%	3606	15.2%	8489	35.8%	778	3.3%					326	1.4%	23686
Kettering	Conservative	10987	41.1%	961	3.6%	3228	12.1%	2787	10.4%	2769	10.3%	4473	16.7%	254	0.9%					1302	4.9%	26761
Kilmarnock and Loudoun	SNP	3890	15.5%	503	2.0%	2985	11.9%	1406	5.6%	3134	12.5%	2106	8.4%	139	0.6%			10478	41.7%	502	2.0%	25141
Kingston and Surbiton	Lib Dem	7938	21.3%	1496	4.0%	2948	7.9%	3494	9.4%	3091	8.3%	16343	43.8%	1175	3.1%					826	2.2%	37311
Kingston upon Hull East	Labour	7696	50.7%	233	1.5%	534	3.5%	903	5.9%	2798	18.4%	1459	9.6%	460	3.0%					1100	7.2%	15182
Kingston upon Hull North	Labour	5840	35.3%	283	1.7%	362	2.2%	2405	14.5%	2746	16.6%	3226	19.5%	786	4.7%					901	5.4%	16548
Kingston upon Hull West and Hessle	Labour	6605	47.6%	270	1.9%	631	4.5%	934	6.7%	2572	18.5%	1536	11.1%	450	3.2%					888	6.4%	13886
Kingswood	Conservative	9461	41.3%	637	2.8%	2261	9.9%	3246	14.2%	1959	8.5%	4413	19.2%	107	0.5%					844	3.7%	22928
Kirkcaldy and Cowdenbeath	Labour	1013	5.0%	384	1.9%	2	0.0%	1251	6.2%	2210	10.9%	3284	16.2%	142	0.7%			11539	56.8%	487	2.4%	20312
Knowsley	Labour	4826	25.1%	447	2.3%	329	1.7%	2564	13.3%	8068	42.0%	1566	8.2%	811	4.2%					598	3.1%	19209
Lanark and Hamilton East	SNP	3982	13.1%	602	2.0%	4607	15.2%	1684	5.6%	2772	9.1%	3437	11.3%	156	0.5%			12615	41.6%	480	1.6%	30335
Lancaster and Fleetwood	Labour	7724	27.4%	604	2.1%	3098	11.0%	5884	20.9%	3833	13.6%	4776	17.0%	1109	3.9%					1133	4.0%	28162
Leeds Central	Labour	7368	21.7%	656	1.9%	962	2.8%	7537	22.2%	9313	27.4%	4734	14.0%	1943	5.7%					1418	4.2%	33929
Leeds East	Labour	6298	35.2%	383	2.1%	1322	7.4%	1323	7.4%	5786	32.3%	1847	10.3%	191	1.1%					745	4.2%	17894
Leeds North East	Labour	4591	20.7%	801	3.6%	2108	9.5%	2991	13.5%	5001	22.5%	6178	27.8%	141	0.6%					374	1.7%	22184
Leeds North West	Labour	6713	21.5%	613	2.0%	1524	4.9%	7716	24.7%	1893	6.1%	7392	23.7%	4265	13.7%					1093	3.5%	31209
Leeds West	Labour	5912	27.5%	476	2.2%	982	4.6%	4360	20.3%	5741	26.7%	2589	12.1%	660	3.1%					761	3.5%	21483
Leicester East	Labour	3327	13.6%	429	1.8%	2061	8.4%	872	3.6%	15150	62.0%	1921	7.9%	83	0.3%					601	2.5%	24442
Leicester South	Labour	4179	14.8%	640	2.3%	1701	6.0%	3688	13.0%	11475	40.6%	5550	19.6%	193	0.7%					869	3.1%	28295
Leicester West	Labour	3961	21.5%	540	2.9%	1509	8.2%	1943	10.5%	6824	37.0%	2859	15.5%	77	0.4%					731	4.0%	18444
Leigh	Labour	8893	42.7%	676	3.2%	1179	5.7%	1866	9.0%	3731	17.9%	2273	10.9%	1069	5.1%					1120	5.4%	20807
Lewes	Conservative	9847	30.6%	1254	3.9%	2539	7.9%	6757	21.0%	1599	5.0%	9469	29.4%	178	0.6%					540	1.7%	32184
Lewisham, Deptford	Labour	2884	8.3%	2008	5.8%	899	2.6%	8725	25.2%	9274	26.8%	9368	27.1%	1051	3.0%					360	1.0%	34569
Lewisham East	Labour	4015	15.4%	1515	5.8%	1095	4.2%	3720	14.3%	6784	26.0%	7504	28.8%	930	3.6%					481	1.8%	26043
Lewisham West and Penge	Labour	4815	16.3%	1767	6.0%	1735	5.9%	5402	18.2%	6195	20.9%	8271	27.9%	945	3.2%					489	1.7%	29619
Leyton and Wanstead	Labour	3578	12.0%	1533	5.2%	1808	6.1%	5060	17.0%	8705	29.3%	7830	26.3%	843	2.8%					403	1.4%	29760
Lichfield	Conservative	11178	43.1%	989	3.8%	3160	12.2%	2971	11.5%	1055	4.1%	5320	20.5%							1236	4.8%	25909
Lincoln	Labour	9078	39.4%	660	2.9%	2071	9.0%	2763	12.0%	3202	13.9%	3890	16.9%	364	1.6%					1040	4.5%	23069
Linlithgow and East Falkirk	SNP	4248	12.3%	764	2.2%	1449	4.2%	2902	8.4%	5492	15.9%	4152	12.0%	205	0.6%			14579	42.3%	678	2.0%	34468
Liverpool, Riverside	Labour	3444	12.1%	665	2.3%	357	1.3%	6922	24.3%	8492	29.8%	6089	21.3%	1961	6.9%					612	2.1%	28542
Liverpool, Walton	Labour	3566	21.9%	305	1.9%	262	1.6%	1334	8.2%	9045	55.5%	1237	7.6%	117	0.7%					426	2.6%	16292
Liverpool, Wavertree	Labour	3025	14.8%	493	2.4%	397	1.9%	3128	15.3%	9029	44.2%	3860	18.9%	192	0.9%					315	1.5%	20440
Liverpool, West Derby	Labour	3961	25.7%	384	2.5%	429	2.8%	1497	9.7%	6813	44.2%	1764	11.5%	132	0.9%					418	2.7%	15398
Livingston	SNP	3924	13.1%	651	2.2%	3587	12.0%	2226	7.4%	4313	14.4%	2278	7.6%	170	0.6%			12105	40.3%	749	2.5%	30004
Llanelli	Labour	7737	22.6%	533	1.6%	1086	3.2%	1012	2.9%	3948	11.5%	1564	4.6%			17622	51.4%			804	2.3%	34306
Loughborough	Conservative	5830	27.9%	888	4.2%	148	0.7%	4083	19.5%	3067	14.7%	5552	26.5%	258	1.2%					1090	5.2%	20916
Louth and Horncastle	Conservative	14502	52.8%	707	2.6%	3296	12.0%	1978	7.2%	1548	5.6%	3394	12.4%	318	1.2%					1712	6.2%	27454
Ludlow	Conservative	9926	41.8%	938	4.0%	830	3.5%	3518	14.8%	1066	4.5%	6325	26.7%							1127	4.7%	23730
Luton North	Labour	5537	31.9%	563	3.2%	1559	9.0%	1113	6.4%	5396	31.1%	2422	14.0%	140	0.8%					622	3.6%	17351
Luton South	Labour	5353	26.6%	639	3.2%	1243	6.2%	1655	8.2%	7557	37.5%	2867	14.2%	163	0.8%					665	3.3%	20142
Macclesfield	Conservative	8764	30.8%	1069	3.8%	3112	10.9%	4454	15.6%	2361	8.3%	7492	26.3%	486	1.7%					744	2.6%	28482
Maidenhead	Conservative	8433	30.1%	1485	5.3%	2189	7.8%	3542	12.6%	1376	4.9%	10393	37.1%	185	0.7%					410	1.5%	28014
Maidstone and The Weald	Conservative	13044	43.2%	1097	3.6%	3810	12.6%	3121	10.3%	1614	5.4%	6639	22.0%	193	0.6%					642	2.1%	30160
Makerfield	Labour	9057	43.0%	638	3.0%	1111	5.3%	1794	8.5%	4042	19.2%	2136	10.2%	1100	5.2%					1163	5.5%	21040
Maldon	Conservative	12333	47.4%	889	3.4%	2723	10.5%	2437	9.4%	1043	4.0%	5419	20.8%	205	0.8%					947	3.6%	25996
Manchester Central	Labour	4133	12.7%	714	2.2%	1301	4.0%	7898	24.4%	11015	34.0%	6018	18.6%	539	1.7%					799	2.5%	32417
Manchester, Gorton	Labour	3000	11.8%	337	1.3%	445	1.8%	3940	15.5%	10656	42.0%	3882	15.3%	2406	9.5%					705	2.8%	25372
Manchester, Withington	Labour	2566	10.3%	824	3.3%	790	3.2%	6075	24.4%	5570	22.4%	8308	33.4%	357	1.4%					376	1.5%	24866
Mansfield	Conservative	11108	50.2%	743	3.4%	1660	7.5%	1313	5.9%	3425	15.5%	1964	8.9%	385	1.7%					1519	6.9%	22117
Meon Valley	Conservative	10549	41.9%	1028	4.1%	1980	7.9%	2642	10.5%	861	3.4%	7334	29.1%	171	0.7%					605	2.4%	25169
Meriden	Conservative	10557	38.7%	961	3.5%	3070	11.3%	3558	13.0%	2261	8.3%	5751	21.1%							1129	4.1%	27286
Merthyr Tydfil and Rhymney	Labour	5842	37.1%	554	3.5%	479	3.0%	507	3.2%	4282	27.2%	1244	7.9%			2023	12.8%			825	5.2%	15756
Mid Bedfordshire	Conservative	11376	34.9%	1554	4.8%	4303	13.2%	4900	15.1%	1553	4.8%	7499	23.0%	256	0.8%					1111	3.4%	32552
Mid Derbyshire	Conservative	8938	35.1%	867	3.4%	2957	11.6%	3343	13.1%	1762	6.9%	6264	24.6%	145	0.6%					1195	4.7%	25471
Mid Dorset and North Poole	Conservative	10342	44.7%	686	3.0%	1822	7.9%	3093	13.4%	954	4.1%	5246	22.7%	134	0.6%					869	3.8%	23145
Mid Norfolk	Conservative	12560	43.2%	877	3.0%	3763	12.9%	3780	13.0%	1508	5.2%	5076	17.5%	287	1.0%					1233	4.2%	29081
Mid Sussex	Conservative	10567	33.2%	1714	5.4%	2439	7.7%	4836	15.2%	1491	4.7%	10021	31.5%	226	0.7%					521	1.6%	31816
Mid Worcestershire	Conservative	12283	41.8%	1228	4.2%	4311	14.7%	3162	10.8%	1529	5.2%	5513	18.7%							1386	4.7%	29412
Middlesbrough	Labour	6443	41.9%	790	5.1%	639	4.2%	908	5.9%	4084	26.5%	1525	9.9%							997	6.5%	15386
Middlesbrough South and East Cleveland	Conservative	9562	47.5%	1125	5.6%	1353	6.7%	1278	6.3%	2088	10.4%	3452	17.2%							1268	6.3%	20126
Midlothian	Labour	3709	14.1%	596	2.3%	2405	9.1%	2379	9.0%	3261	12.4%	3463	13.2%	152	0.6%			9773	37.2%	550	2.1%	26288
Milton Keynes North	Conservative	9910	31.8%	1258	4.0%	2641	8.5%	3724	12.0%	4729	15.2%	7891	25.3%	246	0.8%					757	2.4%	31155
Milton Keynes South	Conservative	10707	35.4%	1219	4.0%	3034	10.0%	3078	10.2%	3978	13.1%	7105	23.5%	279	0.9%					869	2.9%	30270
Mitcham and Morden	Labour	5425	20.9%	1094	4.2%	1938	7.5%	2389	9.2%	8622	33.3%	4606	17.8%	1112	4.3%					725	2.8%	25911
Mole Valley	Conservative	10929	33.1%	1425	4.3%	3662	11.1%	3388	10.3%	861	2.6%	11952	36.3%	185	0.6%					567	1.7%	32969
Monmouth	Conservative	9040	31.8%	1063	3.7%	3102	10.9%	2745	9.7%	2321	8.2%	6137	21.6%			3264	11.5%			715	2.5%	28387
Montgomeryshire	Conservative	7167	42.2%	371	2.2%	1809	10.6%	1207	7.1%	1585	9.3%	4140	24.4%			14	0.1%			696	4.1%	16990
Moray	Conservative	5807	21.9%	585	2.2%	4648	17.5%	1910	7.2%	958	3.6%	2686	10.1%	210	0.8%			9027	34.1%	656	2.5%	26487
Morecambe and Lunesdale	Conservative	8004	42.6%	573	3.0%	800	4.3%	2665	14.2%	2431	12.9%	3550	18.9%	99	0.5%					685	3.6%	18807
Morley and Outwood	Conservative	9404	45.9%	599	2.9%	1810	8.8%	1701	8.3%	2876	14.0%	2564	12.5%	625	3.0%					917	4.5%	20494
Motherwell and Wishaw	SNP	3125	13.5%	406	1.7%	1194	5.1%	1344	5.8%	3818	16.4%	1519	6.5%	125	0.5%			11243	48.4%	445	1.9%	23219
Na h-Eileanan an Iar	SNP	1640	20.0%	130	1.6%	611	7.4%	581	7.1%	814	9.9%	611	7.4%	28	0.3%			3606	43.9%	189	2.3%	8210
Neath	Labour	6414	33.8%	733	3.9%	782	4.1%	1053	5.5%	4444	23.4%	1970	10.4%			2829	14.9%			778	4.1%	19004
New Forest East	Conservative	12096	46.6%	951	3.7%	3139	12.1%	2719	10.5%	1047	4.0%	5079	19.6%	180	0.7%					719	2.8%	25930
New Forest West	Conservative	11758	41.6%	866	3.1%	3327	11.8%	3586	12.7%	793	2.8%	7074	25.0%	205	0.7%					632	2.2%	28241
Newark	Conservative	10845	37.5%	1105	3.8%	3703	12.8%	3295	11.4%	2670	9.2%	5860	20.3%	281	1.0%					1169	4.0%	28928
Newbury	Conservative	10920	32.9%	1360	4.1%	4652	14.0%	4263	12.9%	1081	3.3%	10068	30.4%	210	0.6%					605	1.8%	33158
Newcastle upon Tyne Central	Labour	5021	22.0%	824	3.6%	1201	5.3%	1956	8.6%	8227	36.1%	4456	19.6%							1088	4.8%	22774
Newcastle upon Tyne East	Labour	5754	24.6%	864	3.7%	860	3.7%	3584	15.3%	4488	19.2%	6518	27.9%							1304	5.6%	23371
Newcastle upon Tyne North	Labour	7553	35.4%	1058	5.0%	1572	7.4%	1088	5.1%	3868	18.1%	5175	24.3%							1003	4.7%	21317
Newcastle-under-Lyme	Labour	9352	42.2%	689	3.1%	1964	8.9%	2303	10.4%	3187	14.4%	3301	14.9%							1353	6.1%	22149
Newport East	Labour	6928	34.9%	540	2.7%	1402	7.1%	1033	5.2%	4050	20.4%	1950	9.8%			3254	16.4%			716	3.6%	19872
Newport West	Labour	7439	39.0%	716	3.8%	1915	10.0%	1419	7.4%	3431	18.0%	3448	18.1%			23	0.1%			673	3.5%	19065
Newton Abbot	Conservative	12685	43.8%	711	2.5%	2122	7.3%	4688	16.2%	1346	4.6%	6285	21.7%	247	0.9%					900	3.1%	28985
Normanton, Pontefract and Castleford	Labour	11541	47.9%	446	1.9%	1421	5.9%	1609	6.7%	3966	16.5%	1857	7.7%	1628	6.8%					1610	6.7%	24079
North Ayrshire and Arran	SNP	4715	17.5%	548	2.0%	3167	11.8%	1525	5.7%	2380	8.9%	2539	9.4%	153	0.6%			11299	42.0%	553	2.1%	26879
North Cornwall	Conservative	12578	45.4%	650	2.3%	2340	8.5%	4272	15.4%	1803	6.5%	4728	17.1%	225	0.8%					1096	4.0%	27692
North Devon	Conservative	12077	42.7%	563	2.0%	2408	8.5%	4261	15.1%	1101	3.9%	6587	23.3%	266	0.9%					1046	3.7%	28309
North Dorset	Conservative	14332	41.6%	833	2.4%	6374	18.5%	3985	11.6%	1174	3.4%	6381	18.5%	250	0.7%					1126	3.3%	34454
North Durham	Labour	8834	45.6%	861	4.4%	1387	7.2%	1184	6.1%	3127	16.2%	2713	14.0%							1248	6.4%	19354
North East Bedfordshire	Conservative	10975	37.1%	1401	4.7%	3299	11.2%	3276	11.1%	1685	5.7%	7668	25.9%	212	0.7%					1042	3.5%	29560
North East Cambridgeshire	Conservative	13190	50.2%	838	3.2%	3317	12.6%	2288	8.7%	1534	5.8%	3417	13.0%	270	1.0%					1413	5.4%	26265
North East Derbyshire	Conservative	10195	42.4%	718	3.0%	2492	10.4%	2350	9.8%	3051	12.7%	3817	15.9%	180	0.7%					1234	5.1%	24036
North East Fife	SNP	14006	30.8%	712	1.6%	9911	21.8%	1996	4.4%	1124	2.5%	9240	20.3%	133	0.3%			7744	17.1%	543	1.2%	45409
North East Hampshire	Conservative	10486	33.4%	1590	5.1%	3962	12.6%	3570	11.4%	817	2.6%	10170	32.4%	254	0.8%					534	1.7%	31383
North East Hertfordshire	Conservative	9247	32.3%	1094	3.8%	3145	11.0%	3916	13.7%	1945	6.8%	8182	28.6%	279	1.0%					785	2.7%	28592
North East Somerset	Conservative	9529	36.7%	780	3.0%	2428	9.4%	3462	13.3%	1333	5.1%	7620	29.4%	62	0.2%					731	2.8%	25945
North Herefordshire	Conservative	10940	38.5%	1194	4.2%	3137	11.0%	4601	16.2%	865	3.0%	6463	22.7%							1221	4.3%	28421
North Norfolk	Lib Dem	11398	41.4%	642	2.3%	2488	9.0%	2851	10.4%	1020	3.7%	7780	28.2%	265	1.0%					1100	4.0%	27544
North Shropshire	Conservative	11443	43.0%	1039	3.9%	906	3.4%	3279	12.3%	3394	12.8%	5125	19.3%							1396	5.3%	26583
North Somerset	Conservative	11055	33.3%	1249	3.8%	2605	7.8%	6185	18.6%	1177	3.5%	9894	29.8%	262	0.8%					799	2.4%	33225
North Swindon	Conservative	10936	39.4%	1012	3.6%	3005	10.8%	3374	12.2%	3434	12.4%	4471	16.1%	285	1.0%					1221	4.4%	27736
North Thanet	Conservative	12389	53.8%	836	3.6%	1671	7.3%	2239	9.7%	1891	8.2%	3144	13.7%	97	0.4%					759	3.3%	23026
North Tyneside	Labour	9182	36.3%	922	3.6%	1799	7.1%	1703	6.7%	7022	27.7%	3055	12.1%							1624	6.4%	25306
North Warwickshire	Conservative	11507	49.3%	687	2.9%	2608	11.2%	1848	7.9%	2575	11.0%	2543	10.9%							1585	6.8%	23353
North West Cambridgeshire	Conservative	13813	40.8%	1391	4.1%	3985	11.8%	4106	12.1%	2372	7.0%	6777	20.0%	281	0.8%					1167	3.4%	33891
North West Durham	Labour	8746	41.5%	999	4.7%	1356	6.4%	1809	8.6%	3130	14.8%	3883	18.4%							1165	5.5%	21088
North West Hampshire	Conservative	12062	39.7%	1265	4.2%	3748	12.3%	3424	11.3%	1376	4.5%	7512	24.7%	280	0.9%					753	2.5%	30419
North West Leicestershire	Conservative	11019	43.3%	999	3.9%	2873	11.3%	2520	9.9%	2350	9.2%	4168	16.4%	218	0.9%					1292	5.1%	25439
North West Norfolk	Conservative	10716	44.9%	877	3.7%	2631	11.0%	2867	12.0%	1802	7.6%	3703	15.5%	223	0.9%					1047	4.4%	23866
North Wiltshire	Conservative	10470	36.9%	1027	3.6%	2419	8.5%	4403	15.5%	1032	3.6%	7826	27.6%	290	1.0%					896	3.2%	28364
Northampton North	Conservative	8545	38.5%	873	3.9%	2125	9.6%	2481	11.2%	3478	15.7%	3335	15.0%	217	1.0%					1142	5.1%	22196
Northampton South	Conservative	8075	36.6%	1002	4.5%	2247	10.2%	2204	10.0%	3944	17.9%	3406	15.4%	158	0.7%					1029	4.7%	22066
Norwich North	Conservative	8575	38.4%	684	3.1%	2054	9.2%	2845	12.7%	3247	14.5%	3914	17.5%	148	0.7%					876	3.9%	22344
Norwich South	Labour	5988	20.0%	949	3.2%	1677	5.6%	8342	27.9%	4155	13.9%	7824	26.2%	240	0.8%					727	2.4%	29902
Nottingham East	Labour	3894	19.6%	790	4.0%	900	4.5%	2942	14.8%	7565	38.2%	3029	15.3%	65	0.3%					632	3.2%	19818
Nottingham North	Labour	5512	34.4%	557	3.5%	1079	6.7%	978	6.1%	5858	36.5%	1276	8.0%	16	0.1%					765	4.8%	16040
Nottingham South	Labour	6392	25.2%	835	3.3%	1670	6.6%	4794	18.9%	4771	18.8%	5143	20.3%	394	1.6%					1373	5.4%	25373
Nuneaton	Conservative	9582	43.6%	710	3.2%	1805	8.2%	2128	9.7%	3543	16.1%	2895	13.2%							1293	5.9%	21956
Ochil and South Perthshire	Conservative	4974	15.3%	561	1.7%	3844	11.8%	2078	6.4%	1764	5.4%	4274	13.1%	161	0.5%			14394	44.2%	527	1.6%	32578
Ogmore	Labour	6305	41.8%	525	3.5%	807	5.3%	728	4.8%	3920	26.0%	1290	8.5%			786	5.2%			725	4.8%	15088
Old Bexley and Sidcup	Conservative	11227	44.1%	979	3.8%	2981	11.7%	1948	7.6%	2283	9.0%	3982	15.6%	885	3.5%					1190	4.7%	25476
Oldham East and Saddleworth	Labour	7076	29.1%	522	2.1%	1197	4.9%	2266	9.3%	7607	31.2%	3601	14.8%	1091	4.5%					993	4.1%	24354
Oldham West and Royton	Labour	6587	28.8%	387	1.7%	1055	4.6%	1489	6.5%	9083	39.7%	2145	9.4%	1042	4.6%					1087	4.8%	22874
Orkney and Shetland	Lib Dem	2365	18.0%	157	1.2%	841	6.4%	1480	11.2%	509	3.9%	4145	31.5%	53	0.4%			3299	25.1%	308	2.3%	13157
Orpington	Conservative	11016	38.7%	1275	4.5%	3153	11.1%	2680	9.4%	1865	6.5%	6631	23.3%	975	3.4%					883	3.1%	28478
Oxford East	Labour	4429	15.4%	1154	4.0%	474	1.6%	6174	21.4%	5666	19.7%	10262	35.6%	220	0.8%					443	1.5%	28822
Oxford West and Abingdon	Lib Dem	9526	21.3%	1666	3.7%	5089	11.4%	7549	16.9%	1962	4.4%	18280	40.8%	159	0.4%					535	1.2%	44768
Paisley and Renfrewshire North	SNP	3601	14.0%	576	2.2%	3160	12.2%	1299	5.0%	2097	8.1%	3172	12.3%	167	0.6%			11251	43.6%	473	1.8%	25796
Paisley and Renfrewshire South	SNP	3588	13.4%	514	1.9%	1781	6.6%	2246	8.4%	4879	18.2%	2488	9.3%	163	0.6%			10619	39.6%	518	1.9%	26796
Pendle	Conservative	7609	34.4%	353	1.6%	2786	12.6%	1629	7.4%	5765	26.1%	2325	10.5%	742	3.4%					896	4.1%	22105
Penistone and Stocksbridge	Labour	9406	48.8%	530	2.7%	1069	5.5%	2106	10.9%	1802	9.3%	2844	14.7%	642	3.3%					885	4.6%	19284
Penrith and The Border	Conservative	9049	37.3%	668	2.7%	3085	12.7%	3450	14.2%	1427	5.9%	5144	21.2%	660	2.7%					807	3.3%	24291
Perth and North Perthshire	SNP	5396	16.9%	561	1.8%	7689	24.0%	2593	8.1%	1340	4.2%	4439	13.9%	165	0.5%			9303	29.1%	521	1.6%	32006
Peterborough	Labour	9107	37.0%	663	2.7%	2450	9.9%	2463	10.0%	5525	22.4%	3280	13.3%	220	0.9%					936	3.8%	24644
Plymouth, Moor View	Conservative	10464	49.7%	573	2.7%	1860	8.8%	1696	8.1%	3111	14.8%	2080	9.9%	110	0.5%					1142	5.4%	21036
Plymouth, Sutton and Devonport	Labour	9560	33.7%	833	2.9%	1669	5.9%	5887	20.7%	3807	13.4%	4987	17.6%	446	1.6%					1199	4.2%	28389
Pontypridd	Labour	6376	23.2%	675	2.5%	860	3.1%	1374	5.0%	3193	11.6%	2483	9.0%			11870	43.2%			651	2.4%	27483
Poole	Conservative	10728	42.1%	860	3.4%	2072	8.1%	3472	13.6%	1303	5.1%	6049	23.7%	69	0.3%					955	3.7%	25507
Poplar and Limehouse	Labour	3304	10.6%	1747	5.6%	1660	5.3%	2864	9.2%	11861	38.1%	8490	27.3%	730	2.3%					472	1.5%	31129
Portsmouth North	Conservative	10287	49.2%	704	3.4%	1848	8.8%	1629	7.8%	1893	9.1%	3771	18.0%	70	0.3%					708	3.4%	20911
Portsmouth South	Labour	8028	31.5%	763	3.0%	1520	6.0%	4240	16.6%	3056	12.0%	6830	26.8%	274	1.1%					795	3.1%	25505
Preseli Pembrokeshire	Conservative	8279	33.9%	551	2.3%	2042	8.4%	1763	7.2%	2777	11.4%	2899	11.9%			5378	22.0%			734	3.0%	24422
Preston	Labour	5308	24.1%	328	1.5%	973	4.4%	1920	8.7%	9054	41.1%	2570	11.7%	1003	4.6%					856	3.9%	22013
Pudsey	Conservative	6994	34.0%	743	3.6%	1932	9.4%	2710	13.2%	2557	12.4%	4851	23.6%	160	0.8%					611	3.0%	20558
Putney	Conservative	3906	14.1%	2104	7.6%	899	3.2%	3660	13.2%	3766	13.6%	11741	42.3%	1268	4.6%					392	1.4%	27737
Rayleigh and Wickford	Conservative	15153	54.6%	880	3.2%	2770	10.0%	2423	8.7%	1318	4.8%	3659	13.2%	319	1.1%					1218	4.4%	27740
Reading East	Labour	6757	21.7%	1497	4.8%	2377	7.6%	5772	18.5%	4116	13.2%	9789	31.4%	371	1.2%					499	1.6%	31178
Reading West	Conservative	8024	32.7%	1081	4.4%	2295	9.4%	3211	13.1%	3766	15.4%	5477	22.3%	127	0.5%					531	2.2%	24512
Redcar	Labour	9599	50.6%	697	3.7%	1280	6.7%	910	4.8%	3038	16.0%	1970	10.4%							1485	7.8%	18978
Redditch	Conservative	8871	42.3%	876	4.2%	2518	12.0%	1897	9.0%	2371	11.3%	3217	15.3%							1220	5.8%	20971
Reigate	Conservative	10263	33.1%	1479	4.8%	3515	11.4%	4475	14.5%	1655	5.3%	8733	28.2%	231	0.7%					617	2.0%	30968
Rhondda	Labour	5583	46.4%	318	2.6%	427	3.6%	495	4.1%	3858	32.1%	697	5.8%							648	5.4%	12027
Ribble Valley	Conservative	11272	41.0%	743	2.7%	3356	12.2%	2991	10.9%	2565	9.3%	4836	17.6%	696	2.5%					1011	3.7%	27472
Richmond	Conservative	11897	37.7%	1031	3.3%	4313	13.7%	3868	12.3%	1493	4.7%	6036	19.1%	1814	5.7%					1097	3.5%	31549
Richmond Park	Conservative	6264	13.4%	2182	4.7%	3778	8.1%	4621	9.9%	2192	4.7%	26153	56.1%	949	2.0%					496	1.1%	46635
Rochdale	Labour	6516	26.6%	412	1.7%	1165	4.8%	1865	7.6%	9736	39.7%	2533	10.3%	1231	5.0%					1038	4.2%	24497
Rochester and Strood	Conservative	12981	43.0%	889	2.9%	3118	10.3%	2532	8.4%	5871	19.4%	3691	12.2%	185	0.6%					923	3.1%	30190
Rochford and Southend East	Conservative	9786	41.7%	750	3.2%	2033	8.7%	3033	12.9%	2683	11.4%	4014	17.1%	227	1.0%					936	4.0%	23462
Romford	Conservative	12247	45.3%	875	3.2%	2604	9.6%	2141	7.9%	3421	12.7%	3385	12.5%	938	3.5%					1395	5.2%	27008
Romsey and Southampton North	Conservative	9205	31.0%	1171	3.9%	3405	11.5%	4211	14.2%	1164	3.9%	9685	32.6%	302	1.0%					584	2.0%	29728
Ross, Skye and Lochaber	SNP	4192	17.7%	394	1.7%	1989	8.4%	1977	8.4%	433	1.8%	5487	23.2%	132	0.6%			8566	36.2%	481	2.0%	23652
Rossendale and Darwen	Conservative	9212	38.0%	639	2.6%	2254	9.3%	2809	11.6%	3952	16.3%	3311	13.7%	1056	4.4%					1017	4.2%	24249
Rother Valley	Labour	11019	45.8%	606	2.5%	1468	6.1%	2229	9.3%	3130	13.0%	2587	10.8%	1582	6.6%					1437	6.0%	24057
Rotherham	Labour	7599	38.0%	385	1.9%	796	4.0%	1643	8.2%	5561	27.8%	1433	7.2%	1349	6.7%					1228	6.1%	19994
Rugby	Conservative	11254	40.3%	998	3.6%	3616	12.9%	2767	9.9%	2921	10.4%	5161	18.5%							1238	4.4%	27956
Ruislip, Northwood and Pinner	Conservative	7816	27.2%	1454	5.1%	5196	18.1%	2113	7.4%	2655	9.2%	8076	28.1%	723	2.5%					670	2.3%	28704
Runnymede and Weybridge	Conservative	9572	34.0%	1429	5.1%	3389	12.0%	3275	11.6%	1583	5.6%	8047	28.6%	253	0.9%					628	2.2%	28177
Rushcliffe	Conservative	8871	26.3%	1602	4.8%	4437	13.2%	5314	15.8%	2848	8.5%	9428	28.0%	272	0.8%					900	2.7%	33673
Rutherglen and Hamilton West	Labour	4510	15.2%	525	1.8%	2040	6.9%	2340	7.9%	5300	17.9%	2397	8.1%	133	0.4%			11785	39.8%	571	1.9%	29600
Rutland and Melton	Conservative	11722	38.4%	1115	3.6%	4244	13.9%	3916	12.8%	1420	4.6%	6661	21.8%	297	1.0%					1174	3.8%	30548
Saffron Walden	Conservative	13019	38.6%	1289	3.8%	3715	11.0%	3987	11.8%	1078	3.2%	9600	28.5%	239	0.7%					770	2.3%	33698
Salford and Eccles	Labour	6554	26.3%	733	2.9%	1404	5.6%	4589	18.4%	5960	24.0%	3227	13.0%	1355	5.4%					1058	4.3%	24880
Salisbury	Conservative	9995	32.9%	1012	3.3%	2168	7.1%	5828	19.2%	1113	3.7%	9114	30.0%	285	0.9%					898	3.0%	30412
Scarborough and Whitby	Conservative	10848	42.1%	706	2.7%	2189	8.5%	2980	11.6%	2626	10.2%	3736	14.5%	1444	5.6%					1239	4.8%	25768
Scunthorpe	Labour	8880	44.6%	465	2.3%	2207	11.1%	1528	7.7%	3425	17.2%	1746	8.8%	466	2.3%					1182	5.9%	19899
Sedgefield	Labour	8230	44.9%	815	4.4%	1447	7.9%	1260	6.9%	2571	14.0%	2875	15.7%							1146	6.2%	18343
Sefton Central	Labour	6910	31.0%	694	3.1%	1389	6.2%	2838	12.7%	3843	17.3%	5505	24.7%	497	2.2%					588	2.6%	22264
Selby and Ainsty	Conservative	11027	38.8%	874	3.1%	3061	10.8%	2924	10.3%	2125	7.5%	5210	18.4%	2057	7.2%					1111	3.9%	28389
Sevenoaks	Conservative	11594	38.7%	1400	4.7%	3897	13.0%	3339	11.1%	1236	4.1%	7780	26.0%	182	0.6%					530	1.8%	29958
Sheffield, Brightside and Hillsborough	Labour	6021	31.5%	301	1.6%	515	2.7%	2407	12.6%	7249	37.9%	1710	8.9%	84	0.4%					844	4.4%	19132
Sheffield Central	Labour	5215	13.2%	515	1.3%	466	1.2%	17344	43.9%	5959	15.1%	7388	18.7%	1393	3.5%					1250	3.2%	39530
Sheffield, Hallam	Labour	7140	21.8%	711	2.2%	1386	4.2%	8189	25.0%	1460	4.5%	10560	32.3%	2380	7.3%					916	2.8%	32743
Sheffield, Heeley	Labour	7022	35.5%	397	2.0%	769	3.9%	4074	20.6%	3846	19.5%	2765	14.0%	85	0.4%					815	4.1%	19773
Sheffield South East	Labour	8378	46.1%	317	1.7%	1033	5.7%	1615	8.9%	4169	22.9%	1564	8.6%	91	0.5%					1024	5.6%	18191
Sherwood	Conservative	11220	45.0%	971	3.9%	2409	9.7%	2322	9.3%	2483	10.0%	3591	14.4%	396	1.6%					1516	6.1%	24909
Shipley	Conservative	8283	35.0%	591	2.5%	1956	8.3%	3891	16.4%	1989	8.4%	5255	22.2%	894	3.8%					817	3.5%	23676
Shrewsbury and Atcham	Conservative	11440	33.1%	1155	3.3%	6635	19.2%	4986	14.4%	2039	5.9%	7178	20.7%							1161	3.4%	34594
Sittingbourne and Sheppey	Conservative	14379	53.1%	866	3.2%	2256	8.3%	2417	8.9%	2040	7.5%	3795	14.0%	245	0.9%					1068	3.9%	27067
Skipton and Ripon	Conservative	11227	35.2%	958	3.0%	3923	12.3%	4525	14.2%	1657	5.2%	6769	21.2%	1723	5.4%					1095	3.4%	31875
Sleaford and North Hykeham	Conservative	14701	46.4%	1113	3.5%	3805	12.0%	2577	8.1%	1585	5.0%	5124	16.2%	1318	4.2%					1450	4.6%	31675
Slough	Labour	5647	24.9%	776	3.4%	2034	9.0%	1462	6.4%	8656	38.2%	3264	14.4%	304	1.3%					525	2.3%	22668
Solihull	Conservative	10814	40.1%	969	3.6%	3998	14.8%	3217	11.9%	1371	5.1%	5636	20.9%							995	3.7%	27001
Somerton and Frome	Conservative	11788	36.4%	836	2.6%	1519	4.7%	6364	19.7%	1155	3.6%	9452	29.2%	274	0.8%					953	2.9%	32341
South Basildon and East Thurrock	Conservative	12121	54.3%	650	2.9%	1818	8.1%	1717	7.7%	2328	10.4%	2141	9.6%	270	1.2%					1288	5.8%	22333
South Cambridgeshire	Conservative	9349	22.5%	2812	6.8%	3244	7.8%	6392	15.4%	1872	4.5%	16822	40.6%	257	0.6%					729	1.8%	41477
South Derbyshire	Conservative	9976	40.5%	1112	4.5%	3114	12.6%	2318	9.4%	2509	10.2%	3971	16.1%	192	0.8%					1430	5.8%	24622
South Dorset	Conservative	10713	43.4%	649	2.6%	1162	4.7%	3974	16.1%	1671	6.8%	5284	21.4%	196	0.8%					1029	4.2%	24678
South East Cambridgeshire	Conservative	10619	29.2%	2001	5.5%	3735	10.3%	5295	14.6%	1856	5.1%	11816	32.5%	210	0.6%					837	2.3%	36369
South East Cornwall	Conservative	11980	42.2%	732	2.6%	2377	8.4%	4838	17.0%	1606	5.7%	5667	20.0%	236	0.8%					946	3.3%	28382
South Holland and The Deepings	Conservative	13019	53.5%	739	3.0%	3245	13.3%	1700	7.0%	1143	4.7%	2547	10.5%	308	1.3%					1655	6.8%	24355
South Leicestershire	Conservative	11168	40.5%	972	3.5%	3549	12.9%	2957	10.7%	2688	9.7%	4832	17.5%	209	0.8%					1196	4.3%	27570
South Norfolk	Conservative	10860	34.8%	1122	3.6%	3266	10.5%	5385	17.3%	1815	5.8%	7532	24.1%	282	0.9%					951	3.0%	31212
South Northamptonshire	Conservative	12573	35.6%	1716	4.9%	4937	14.0%	4399	12.5%	2198	6.2%	8003	22.7%	291	0.8%					1167	3.3%	35284
South Ribble	Conservative	10392	38.8%	832	3.1%	2826	10.5%	2908	10.9%	3565	13.3%	4593	17.1%	722	2.7%					961	3.6%	26800
South Shields	Labour	8143	40.8%	772	3.9%	988	4.9%	2093	10.5%	4850	24.3%	1791	9.0%							1338	6.7%	19975
South Staffordshire	Conservative	12244	50.2%	896	3.7%	3249	13.3%	2061	8.5%	1567	6.4%	2992	12.3%							1369	5.6%	24378
South Suffolk	Conservative	11771	41.3%	935	3.3%	2824	9.9%	4697	16.5%	1376	4.8%	5807	20.4%	220	0.8%					902	3.2%	28531
South Swindon	Conservative	8190	31.7%	1014	3.9%	2545	9.9%	3487	13.5%	4404	17.1%	5040	19.5%	239	0.9%					894	3.5%	25815
South Thanet	Conservative	12297	46.7%	880	3.3%	2303	8.8%	3309	12.6%	2134	8.1%	4319	16.4%	163	0.6%					898	3.4%	26304
South West Bedfordshire	Conservative	10260	38.0%	1232	4.6%	3076	11.4%	3285	12.2%	2735	10.1%	4957	18.4%	239	0.9%					1184	4.4%	26968
South West Devon	Conservative	12775	45.0%	936	3.3%	3285	11.6%	3611	12.7%	1740	6.1%	4877	17.2%	157	0.6%					1009	3.6%	28392
South West Hertfordshire	Conservative	9785	27.9%	1245	3.6%	3665	10.5%	4627	13.2%	1905	5.4%	12872	36.8%	176	0.5%					743	2.1%	35018
South West Norfolk	Conservative	12741	48.4%	902	3.4%	3302	12.6%	2657	10.1%	1678	6.4%	3378	12.8%	295	1.1%					1356	5.2%	26310
South West Surrey	Conservative	9684	27.9%	1788	5.2%	4519	13.0%	4956	14.3%	889	2.6%	12045	34.7%	307	0.9%					499	1.4%	34685
South West Wiltshire	Conservative	11317	40.2%	879	3.1%	1917	6.8%	4615	16.4%	1766	6.3%	6220	22.1%	317	1.1%					1107	3.9%	28139
Southampton, Itchen	Conservative	9186	41.6%	827	3.7%	1750	7.9%	2398	10.9%	3335	15.1%	3775	17.1%	141	0.6%					686	3.1%	22098
Southampton, Test	Labour	6618	27.9%	927	3.9%	1940	8.2%	3787	16.0%	4224	17.8%	5504	23.2%	132	0.6%					570	2.4%	23701
Southend West	Conservative	10233	43.7%	842	3.6%	2161	9.2%	2728	11.7%	1809	7.7%	4584	19.6%	214	0.9%					828	3.5%	23400
Southport	Conservative	6862	30.3%	608	2.7%	1536	6.8%	2747	12.1%	5005	22.1%	4662	20.6%	554	2.5%					638	2.8%	22612
Spelthorne	Conservative	10860	40.4%	1034	3.8%	2858	10.6%	2842	10.6%	2287	8.5%	5913	22.0%	224	0.8%					849	3.2%	26867
St Albans	Conservative	7070	22.1%	1489	4.7%	2933	9.2%	4089	12.8%	2230	7.0%	13461	42.1%	169	0.5%					501	1.6%	31941
St Austell and Newquay	Conservative	14411	49.3%	704	2.4%	2398	8.2%	3883	13.3%	1926	6.6%	4317	14.8%	262	0.9%					1351	4.6%	29252
St Helens North	Labour	7449	36.0%	657	3.2%	914	4.4%	2908	14.0%	4402	21.3%	2591	12.5%	950	4.6%					834	4.0%	20705
St Helens South and Whiston	Labour	7416	33.1%	645	2.9%	983	4.4%	3185	14.2%	5608	25.1%	2812	12.6%	886	4.0%					838	3.7%	22372
St Ives	Conservative	11689	38.9%	747	2.5%	2645	8.8%	6214	20.7%	1494	5.0%	6097	20.3%	219	0.7%					932	3.1%	30037
Stafford	Conservative	10326	41.1%	1113	4.4%	2815	11.2%	2867	11.4%	2462	9.8%	4173	16.6%							1347	5.4%	25102
Staffordshire Moorlands	Conservative	9682	47.1%	783	3.8%	2282	11.1%	1989	9.7%	1725	8.4%	3015	14.7%							1103	5.4%	20578
Stalybridge and Hyde	Labour	7084	34.4%	585	2.8%	1266	6.1%	2981	14.5%	4272	20.7%	2549	12.4%	879	4.3%					984	4.8%	20601
Stevenage	Conservative	8901	34.7%	996	3.9%	2776	10.8%	2867	11.2%	4044	15.8%	5004	19.5%	228	0.9%					835	3.3%	25650
Stirling	Conservative	3774	12.3%	558	1.8%	4643	15.1%	2937	9.6%	1915	6.2%	4645	15.1%	93	0.3%			11780	38.3%	401	1.3%	30746
Stockport	Labour	5380	24.4%	703	3.2%	1093	5.0%	3400	15.4%	4639	21.0%	5648	25.6%	536	2.4%					647	2.9%	22046
Stockton North	Labour	9198	44.3%	705	3.4%	1674	8.1%	1174	5.7%	4417	21.3%	2181	10.5%							1419	6.8%	20768
Stockton South	Labour	10088	42.4%	1090	4.6%	2439	10.3%	1669	7.0%	3060	12.9%	4112	17.3%							1317	5.5%	23775
Stoke-on-Trent Central	Labour	6235	40.5%	539	3.5%	1108	7.2%	1478	9.6%	3374	21.9%	1644	10.7%							1030	6.7%	15408
Stoke-on-Trent North	Labour	8762	48.2%	585	3.2%	1476	8.1%	948	5.2%	3644	20.0%	1342	7.4%							1419	7.8%	18176
Stoke-on-Trent South	Conservative	7925	49.4%	628	3.9%	1293	8.1%	871	5.4%	2734	17.0%	1479	9.2%							1123	7.0%	16052
Stone	Conservative	9854	42.7%	1051	4.6%	2699	11.7%	2492	10.8%	1637	7.1%	4241	18.4%							1121	4.9%	23095
Stourbridge	Conservative	9659	45.3%	600	2.8%	2164	10.1%	1949	9.1%	2724	12.8%	3026	14.2%							1210	5.7%	21333
Stratford-on-Avon	Conservative	10872	34.3%	1346	4.2%	4327	13.6%	4053	12.8%	1218	3.8%	8766	27.6%							1128	3.6%	31711
Streatham	Labour	2992	9.2%	2675	8.3%	1391	4.3%	6199	19.2%	6935	21.4%	10936	33.8%	930	2.9%					305	0.9%	32363
Stretford and Urmston	Labour	6436	24.0%	675	2.5%	2009	7.5%	3853	14.4%	8734	32.6%	3598	13.4%	656	2.4%					822	3.1%	26783
Stroud	Labour	11033	29.2%	1053	2.8%	3218	8.5%	10720	28.4%	2681	7.1%	7895	20.9%	257	0.7%					891	2.4%	37748
Suffolk Coastal	Conservative	11482	34.3%	989	3.0%	3666	11.0%	6210	18.6%	1654	4.9%	8329	24.9%	270	0.8%					859	2.6%	33460
Sunderland Central	Labour	8543	34.9%	916	3.7%	1462	6.0%	2779	11.4%	5462	22.3%	3426	14.0%							1894	7.7%	24482
Surrey Heath	Conservative	11689	39.5%	1272	4.3%	3727	12.6%	3180	10.7%	1415	4.8%	7514	25.4%	262	0.9%					562	1.9%	29619
Sutton and Cheam	Conservative	8798	29.4%	1105	3.7%	2761	9.2%	2334	7.8%	2647	8.8%	10483	35.0%	953	3.2%					873	2.9%	29954
Sutton Coldfield	Conservative	8220	34.1%	1029	4.3%	3079	12.8%	2746	11.4%	1720	7.1%	6595	27.4%							712	3.0%	24101
Swansea East	Labour	6352	39.9%	490	3.1%	1058	6.6%	712	4.5%	4861	30.5%	1440	9.0%			345	2.2%			673	4.2%	15931
Swansea West	Labour	6233	22.3%	591	2.1%	1219	4.4%	2081	7.5%	3982	14.3%	4120	14.8%			8927	32.0%			737	2.6%	27892
Tamworth	Conservative	10424	45.2%	745	3.2%	2925	12.7%	1708	7.4%	2824	12.2%	2969	12.9%							1479	6.4%	23073
Tatton	Conservative	7734	29.6%	987	3.8%	3118	11.9%	3531	13.5%	2078	8.0%	7592	29.1%	442	1.7%					638	2.4%	26119
Taunton Deane	Conservative	13787	38.6%	1012	2.8%	3602	10.1%	5112	14.3%	1497	4.2%	9281	26.0%	330	0.9%					1110	3.1%	35731
Telford	Conservative	8753	41.5%	755	3.6%	2139	10.2%	1673	7.9%	3994	19.0%	2449	11.6%							1310	6.2%	21073
Tewkesbury	Conservative	11691	37.9%	1000	3.2%	3412	11.1%	4264	13.8%	1240	4.0%	7999	25.9%	266	0.9%					994	3.2%	30866
Thirsk and Malton	Conservative	11964	39.5%	886	2.9%	3919	13.0%	3661	12.1%	1493	4.9%	5318	17.6%	1863	6.2%					1149	3.8%	30253
Thornbury and Yate	Conservative	9213	36.3%	739	2.9%	2643	10.4%	3617	14.2%	1495	5.9%	6867	27.0%	91	0.4%					742	2.9%	25406
Thurrock	Conservative	11083	47.3%	787	3.4%	1762	7.5%	1641	7.0%	4305	18.4%	2126	9.1%	422	1.8%					1289	5.5%	23414
Tiverton and Honiton	Conservative	13689	45.4%	951	3.2%	2868	9.5%	4640	15.4%	1239	4.1%	5141	17.1%	404	1.3%					1210	4.0%	30141
Tonbridge and Malling	Conservative	12125	39.4%	1332	4.3%	3523	11.4%	4233	13.7%	1146	3.7%	7701	25.0%	181	0.6%					569	1.8%	30811
Tooting	Labour	4837	12.4%	2254	5.8%	7539	19.4%	5492	14.1%	6368	16.4%	11115	28.6%	913	2.3%					377	1.0%	38895
Torbay	Conservative	13383	50.6%	724	2.7%	1973	7.5%	2787	10.5%	1260	4.8%	5093	19.3%	215	0.8%					1013	3.8%	26448
Torfaen	Labour	7929	38.5%	682	3.3%	1225	6.0%	1107	5.4%	4030	19.6%	2170	10.5%			2533	12.3%			900	4.4%	20576
Torridge and West Devon	Conservative	15079	44.7%	872	2.6%	2752	8.2%	5626	16.7%	1329	3.9%	6449	19.1%	374	1.1%					1242	3.7%	33722
Totnes	Conservative	12205	40.7%	859	2.9%	2481	8.3%	5664	18.9%	1036	3.5%	6685	22.3%	216	0.7%					818	2.7%	29965
Tottenham	Labour	2504	9.5%	1021	3.9%	807	3.1%	2519	9.5%	13036	49.4%	4974	18.8%	1122	4.3%					411	1.6%	26394
Truro and Falmouth	Conservative	9958	29.5%	801	2.4%	2093	6.2%	8336	24.7%	1908	5.6%	9693	28.7%	188	0.6%					795	2.4%	33773
Tunbridge Wells	Conservative	9834	32.8%	1571	5.2%	2417	8.1%	4267	14.2%	1428	4.8%	9712	32.4%	197	0.7%					576	1.9%	30003
Twickenham	Lib Dem	7694	18.5%	1889	4.5%	3177	7.6%	4579	11.0%	2127	5.1%	20511	49.2%	1111	2.7%					585	1.4%	41672
Tynemouth	Labour	8762	31.5%	1298	4.7%	2231	8.0%	2843	10.2%	4674	16.8%	6743	24.3%							1241	4.5%	27793
Uxbridge and South Ruislip	Conservative	8313	29.5%	1081	3.8%	3368	12.0%	2996	10.6%	4558	16.2%	4874	17.3%	1853	6.6%					1093	3.9%	28135
Vale of Clwyd	Labour	6927	42.5%	475	2.9%	1792	11.0%	1108	6.8%	3188	19.5%	2040	12.5%			24	0.1%			758	4.6%	16312
Vale of Glamorgan	Conservative	10011	31.4%	1072	3.4%	3219	10.1%	2255	7.1%	3726	11.7%	4583	14.4%			6086	19.1%			942	3.0%	31895
Vauxhall	Labour	2350	6.8%	2962	8.6%	1144	3.3%	7916	22.9%	7866	22.8%	11037	31.9%	1014	2.9%					259	0.7%	34547
Wakefield	Labour	8614	40.5%	469	2.2%	1215	5.7%	1940	9.1%	4406	20.7%	2180	10.3%	1375	6.5%					1063	5.0%	21263
Wallasey	Labour	6729	31.6%	519	2.4%	1422	6.7%	3210	15.1%	5764	27.1%	2259	10.6%	600	2.8%					759	3.6%	21261
Walsall North	Conservative	7821	44.9%	430	2.5%	1453	8.3%	970	5.6%	3976	22.8%	1293	7.4%							1473	8.5%	17415
Walsall South	Labour	6284	32.8%	501	2.6%	1942	10.1%	1088	5.7%	6245	32.6%	2000	10.5%							1079	5.6%	19138
Walthamstow	Labour	3268	11.2%	1349	4.6%	1171	4.0%	5299	18.1%	10356	35.4%	6510	22.2%	902	3.1%					427	1.5%	29281
Wansbeck	Labour	7832	39.4%	751	3.8%	1546	7.8%	1463	7.4%	3751	18.9%	3517	17.7%							1024	5.1%	19884
Wantage	Conservative	9785	31.5%	1451	4.7%	1621	5.2%	4166	13.4%	1560	5.0%	11527	37.2%	250	0.8%					661	2.1%	31021
Warley	Labour	5449	28.6%	431	2.3%	968	5.1%	1400	7.3%	8447	44.3%	1499	7.9%							872	4.6%	19067
Warrington North	Labour	8356	33.6%	726	2.9%	1842	7.4%	2822	11.3%	5282	21.2%	3897	15.7%	885	3.6%					1086	4.4%	24896
Warrington South	Labour	9474	30.6%	1108	3.6%	2792	9.0%	3807	12.3%	4252	13.7%	7575	24.5%	927	3.0%					1025	3.3%	30960
Warwick and Leamington	Labour	7314	24.9%	1275	4.3%	2961	10.1%	5633	19.2%	3558	12.1%	7833	26.7%							798	2.7%	29371
Washington and Sunderland West	Labour	8267	40.7%	725	3.6%	1428	7.0%	1234	6.1%	4592	22.6%	2103	10.4%							1955	9.6%	20305
Watford	Conservative	8761	30.2%	914	3.1%	2306	7.9%	2788	9.6%	4086	14.1%	9269	31.9%	158	0.5%					763	2.6%	29045
Waveney	Conservative	12047	47.6%	683	2.7%	2707	10.7%	3081	12.2%	2645	10.4%	2772	10.9%	289	1.1%					1109	4.4%	25332
Wealden	Conservative	13148	39.4%	1444	4.3%	3781	11.3%	5120	15.3%	1163	3.5%	7841	23.5%	217	0.7%					663	2.0%	33377
Weaver Vale	Labour	7067	32.5%	705	3.2%	1817	8.4%	2797	12.9%	3568	16.4%	4607	21.2%	479	2.2%					680	3.1%	21720
Wellingborough	Conservative	10245	40.6%	921	3.6%	2260	9.0%	2600	10.3%	3511	13.9%	3959	15.7%	241	1.0%					1500	5.9%	25237
Wells	Conservative	13377	37.3%	778	2.2%	4054	11.3%	6366	17.8%	1221	3.4%	8709	24.3%	259	0.7%					1060	3.0%	35824
Welwyn Hatfield	Conservative	8936	32.7%	961	3.5%	3044	11.2%	2911	10.7%	2790	10.2%	7716	28.3%	197	0.7%					740	2.7%	27295
Wentworth and Dearne	Labour	10502	46.6%	496	2.2%	1043	4.6%	1848	8.2%	3538	15.7%	1710	7.6%	1829	8.1%					1556	6.9%	22523
West Aberdeenshire and Kincardine	Conservative	4963	16.7%	644	2.2%	5317	17.9%	1775	6.0%	483	1.6%	7075	23.8%	132	0.4%			8900	29.9%	491	1.6%	29780
West Bromwich East	Labour	6380	37.8%	396	2.3%	1175	7.0%	996	5.9%	5705	33.8%	1208	7.2%							1007	6.0%	16866
West Bromwich West	Labour	6730	39.8%	369	2.2%	956	5.7%	1101	6.5%	5527	32.7%	1082	6.4%							1134	6.7%	16899
West Dorset	Conservative	12452	35.4%	843	2.4%	2868	8.2%	6778	19.3%	933	2.7%	10036	28.6%	219	0.6%					1012	2.9%	35141
West Dunbartonshire	SNP	3240	13.8%	417	1.8%	1484	6.3%	1554	6.6%	3748	16.0%	1706	7.3%	138	0.6%			10670	45.5%	486	2.1%	23443
West Ham	Labour	4268	13.5%	1306	4.1%	2206	7.0%	2739	8.7%	13953	44.2%	5000	15.8%	1393	4.4%					708	2.2%	31574
West Lancashire	Labour	8376	33.6%	750	3.0%	2113	8.5%	3172	12.7%	5000	20.1%	3873	15.5%	711	2.9%					913	3.7%	24907
West Suffolk	Conservative	10948	42.0%	1169	4.5%	2863	11.0%	3028	11.6%	1920	7.4%	4657	17.8%	433	1.7%					1074	4.1%	26092
West Worcestershire	Conservative	11673	36.7%	1371	4.3%	3763	11.8%	4591	14.4%	1221	3.8%	7920	24.9%							1254	3.9%	31794
Westminster North	Labour	3512	16.0%	1421	6.5%	2250	10.3%	1928	8.8%	5646	25.8%	6566	30.0%	254	1.2%					333	1.5%	21911
Westmorland and Lonsdale	Lib Dem	8864	29.4%	537	1.8%	2856	9.5%	4220	14.0%	1438	4.8%	10985	36.5%	437	1.5%					765	2.5%	30102
Weston-Super-Mare	Conservative	12333	43.1%	899	3.1%	2431	8.5%	4627	16.2%	1903	6.7%	4959	17.3%	343	1.2%					1092	3.8%	28588
Wigan	Labour	7836	37.0%	642	3.0%	984	4.6%	2322	11.0%	4655	22.0%	2582	12.2%	1060	5.0%					1086	5.1%	21166
Wimbledon	Conservative	4707	13.3%	2476	7.0%	2870	8.1%	4395	12.4%	4113	11.6%	15415	43.6%	955	2.7%					431	1.2%	35362
Winchester	Conservative	10823	27.8%	1359	3.5%	4816	12.4%	4503	11.6%	873	2.2%	15834	40.7%	201	0.5%					498	1.3%	38907
Windsor	Conservative	10431	34.0%	1502	4.9%	4694	15.3%	3181	10.4%	1445	4.7%	8706	28.4%	240	0.8%					480	1.6%	30679
Wirral South	Labour	5942	28.2%	631	3.0%	1819	8.6%	3715	17.6%	2443	11.6%	5455	25.9%	506	2.4%					545	2.6%	21056
Wirral West	Labour	5719	28.9%	634	3.2%	1769	8.9%	3715	18.8%	2293	11.6%	4611	23.3%	516	2.6%					518	2.6%	19775
Witham	Conservative	11330	46.0%	813	3.3%	3126	12.7%	2751	11.2%	1256	5.1%	4293	17.4%	198	0.8%					880	3.6%	24646
Witney	Conservative	10501	31.3%	1355	4.0%	3683	11.0%	4782	14.2%	1812	5.4%	10604	31.6%	225	0.7%					638	1.9%	33600
Woking	Conservative	8432	29.0%	1454	5.0%	3317	11.4%	3050	10.5%	1770	6.1%	10283	35.4%	231	0.8%					537	1.8%	29074
Wokingham	Conservative	9574	29.2%	1742	5.3%	4682	14.3%	3667	11.2%	1586	4.8%	10845	33.1%	219	0.7%					491	1.5%	32807
Wolverhampton North East	Labour	7030	42.5%	370	2.2%	1292	7.8%	1040	6.3%	4384	26.5%	1238	7.5%							1200	7.2%	16555
Wolverhampton South East	Labour	6172	38.2%	320	2.0%	1253	7.8%	772	4.8%	5527	34.2%	999	6.2%							1106	6.8%	16151
Wolverhampton South West	Labour	6308	33.4%	602	3.2%	2132	11.3%	1856	9.8%	4155	22.0%	3040	16.1%							779	4.1%	18872
Worcester	Conservative	8364	32.9%	973	3.8%	2478	9.8%	4293	16.9%	3109	12.2%	5018	19.8%							1172	4.6%	25407
Workington	Labour	7749	41.5%	727	3.9%	1767	9.5%	1799	9.6%	2795	15.0%	2368	12.7%	663	3.5%					823	4.4%	18691
Worsley and Eccles South	Labour	7150	36.3%	567	2.9%	1695	8.6%	1615	8.2%	4160	21.1%	2574	13.1%	896	4.6%					1025	5.2%	19681
Worthing West	Conservative	12390	40.6%	1138	3.7%	3080	10.1%	4149	13.6%	2155	7.1%	6632	21.7%	217	0.7%					742	2.4%	30503
The Wrekin	Conservative	11579	41.7%	1001	3.6%	4649	16.8%	2231	8.0%	2947	10.6%	4055	14.6%							1281	4.6%	27742
Wrexham	Labour	6203	31.7%	705	3.6%	1417	7.2%	972	5.0%	2650	13.5%	2541	13.0%			4572	23.3%			525	2.7%	19585
Wycombe	Conservative	8445	29.9%	1242	4.4%	3318	11.7%	3755	13.3%	4190	14.8%	6554	23.2%	220	0.8%					544	1.9%	28269
Wyre and Preston North	Conservative	9283	38.4%	725	3.0%	3302	13.7%	2562	10.6%	2054	8.5%	4787	19.8%	519	2.1%					939	3.9%	24171
Wyre Forest	Conservative	11238	46.0%	1093	4.5%	2482	10.2%	2621	10.7%	1855	7.6%	3722	15.2%							1423	5.8%	24434
Wythenshawe and Sale East	Labour	5077	24.5%	635	3.1%	1477	7.1%	2961	14.3%	5547	26.7%	4172	20.1%	252	1.2%					626	3.0%	20746
Yeovil	Conservative	14751	44.5%	754	2.3%	3749	11.3%	3847	11.6%	1161	3.5%	7361	22.2%	305	0.9%					1207	3.6%	33135
Ynys Môn	Labour	6791	33.0%	382	1.9%	1157	5.6%	941	4.6%	1890	9.2%	1603	7.8%			7144	34.7%			668	3.2%	20576
York Central	Labour	6234	22.2%	770	2.7%	1177	4.2%	7341	26.1%	4163	14.8%	7315	26.0%	419	1.5%					671	2.4%	28090
York Outer	Conservative	9113	31.1%	718	2.4%	2180	7.4%	4082	13.9%	2078	7.1%	9025	30.8%	1361	4.6%					769	2.6%	29326

== Best and worst results for each party ==
		Brexit		Liberal Democrat		Labour		Green		Conservative		SNP	
		Constituency	%	Constituency	%	Constituency	%	Constituency	%	Constituency	%	Constituency	%
Best	1	Castle Point	58.7	Richmond Park	56.1	Birmingham, Hodge Hill	63.0	Bristol West	44.9	Edinburgh East	29.9	Glasgow East	64.6
Best	2	Clacton	57.5	Edinburgh South	54.6	Leicester East	62.0	Sheffield Central	43.9	Glasgow North	25.8	Glasgow North East	62.2
Best	3	Boston and Skegness	56.4	Twickenham	49.2	East Ham	57.4	Brighton, Pavilion	41.2	Perth and North Perthshire	24.0	Kirkcaldy and Cowdenbeath	56.8
Best	4	Rayleigh and Wickford	54.6	Kingston and Surbiton	43.8	Liverpool, Walton	55.5	Bristol South	33.8	Devizes	23.4	Glasgow South	54.8
Best	5	Blaydon	54.3	Wimbledon	43.6	Birmingham, Hall Green	55.4	Glasgow Central	31.7	Dumfriesshire, Clydesdale and Tweeddale	23.2	Dundee East	53.6
Best	6	South Basildon and East Thurrock	54.3	Cambridge	42.9	Birmingham, Ladywood	55.4	Hove	30.2	Charnwood	22.0	Glenrothes	53.1
Best	7	North Thanet	53.8	Putney	42.3	Blackburn	53.5	Bristol North West	29.1	North East Fife	21.8	Glasgow South West	52.1
Best	8	Cleethorpes	53.7	St Albans	42.1	Bradford West	52.1	Brighton, Kemptown	28.4	Berwickshire, Roxburgh and Selkirk	21.4	Glasgow North West	51.0
Best	9	South Holland and The Deepings	53.5	Battersea	41.7	Blackley and Broughton	50.1	Stroud	28.4	Tooting	19.4	Dunfermline and West Fife	50.4
Best	10	Gillingham and Rainham	53.1	Hitchin and Harpenden	41.0	Ilford South	49.8	Exeter	28.3	Aberdeen North	19.2	Edinburgh North and Leith	49.0
Worst	1	Glasgow South	0.3	Glasgow East	3.2	Blaydon	0.0	Blaydon	0.1	Edinburgh West		Glasgow North	16.2
Worst	2	Glasgow North East	0.4	Glasgow North East	3.7	Falkirk	0.6	Llanelli	2.9	Glasgow South		North East Fife	17.1
Worst	3	Glasgow North West	0.4	Dwyfor Meirionnydd	4.1	West Aberdeenshire and Kincardine	1.6	Dwyfor Meirionnydd	3.0	Glasgow South West		Edinburgh East	20.4
Worst	4	Glasgow South West	0.4	Glasgow South West	4.3	Ross, Skye and Lochaber	1.8	Merthyr Tydfil and Rhymney	3.2	Glasgow North West		Edinburgh South	23.6
Worst	5	Glasgow East	0.5	Llanelli	4.6	Winchester	2.2	Leicester East	3.6	Glasgow North East		Orkney and Shetland	25.1
Worst	6	Edinburgh North and Leith	0.6	Edinburgh East	4.7	Buckingham	2.4	Aberavon	3.9	Dunfermline and West Fife	0.0	Dumfriesshire, Clydesdale and Tweeddale	25.6
Worst	7	Edinburgh West	1.0	Airdrie and Shotts	5.6	Arundel and South Downs	2.5	Rhondda	4.1	Edinburgh North and Leith	0.0	Berwickshire, Roxburgh and Selkirk	28.3
Worst	8	Edinburgh South West	1.8	Rhondda	5.8	North East Fife	2.5	Falkirk	4.2	Edinburgh South West	0.0	Aberdeen North	28.8
Worst	9	Dunfermline and West Fife	3.7	Wolverhampton South East	6.2	Gordon	2.6	Islwyn	4.2	Glasgow East	0.0	Dumfries and Galloway	29.1
Worst	10	Edinburgh South	4.2	West Bromwich West	6.4	Mole Valley	2.6	Blaenau Gwent	4.3	Glenrothes	0.0	Perth and North Perthshire	29.1

		Plaid Cymru		Change UK		UKIP	
		Constituency	%	Constituency	%	Constituency	%
Best	1	Dwyfor Meirionnydd	62.1	Battersea	9.3	Houghton and Sunderland South	10.2
Best	2	Llanelli	51.4	Vauxhall	8.6	Washington and Sunderland West	9.6
Best	3	Cardiff South and Penarth	45.8	Finchley and Golders Green	8.5	Hartlepool	8.9
Best	4	Pontypridd	43.2	Streatham	8.3	Walsall North	8.5
Best	5	Clwyd West	39.3	Chipping Barnet	7.6	Easington	8.3
Best	6	Ceredigion	37.2	Putney	7.6	Blaydon	8.0
Best	7	Ynys Môn	34.7	Hampstead and Kilburn	7.3	Ashfield	7.8
Best	8	Islwyn	33.9	Hendon	7.0	Redcar	7.8
Best	9	Swansea West	32.0	Wimbledon	7.0	Stoke-on-Trent North	7.8
Best	10	Arfon	29.0	Greenwich and Woolwich	6.9	Boston and Skegness	7.7
Worst	1	Gower	0.0	Glasgow East	0.9	Vauxhall	0.7
Worst	2	Cynon Valley	0.1	Glasgow North East	1.0	Hornsey and Wood Green	0.7
Worst	3	Montgomeryshire	0.1	Glasgow South West	1.0	Edinburgh North and Leith	0.8
Worst	4	Newport West	0.1	Bradford West	1.1	Battersea	0.9
Worst	5	Vale of Clwyd	0.1	Dwyfor Meirionnydd	1.1	Glasgow North	0.9
Worst	6	Caerphilly	0.5	Orkney and Shetland	1.2	Hampstead and Kilburn	0.9
Worst	7	Aberconwy	1.0	Blackburn	1.3	Hove	0.9
Worst	8	Cardiff North	1.9	Bradford East	1.3	Streatham	0.9
Worst	9	Swansea East	2.2	Manchester, Gorton	1.3	Brighton, Pavilion	1.0
Worst	10	Alyn and Deeside	3.1	Sheffield Central	1.3	Dulwich and West Norwood	1.0
