= 2006 Dunfermline and West Fife by-election =

UK parliamentary by-election

- 9 February 2006

Dunfermline and West Fife parliamentary seat
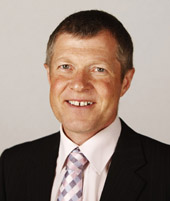

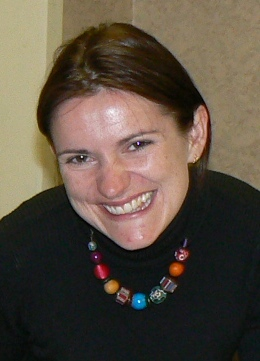

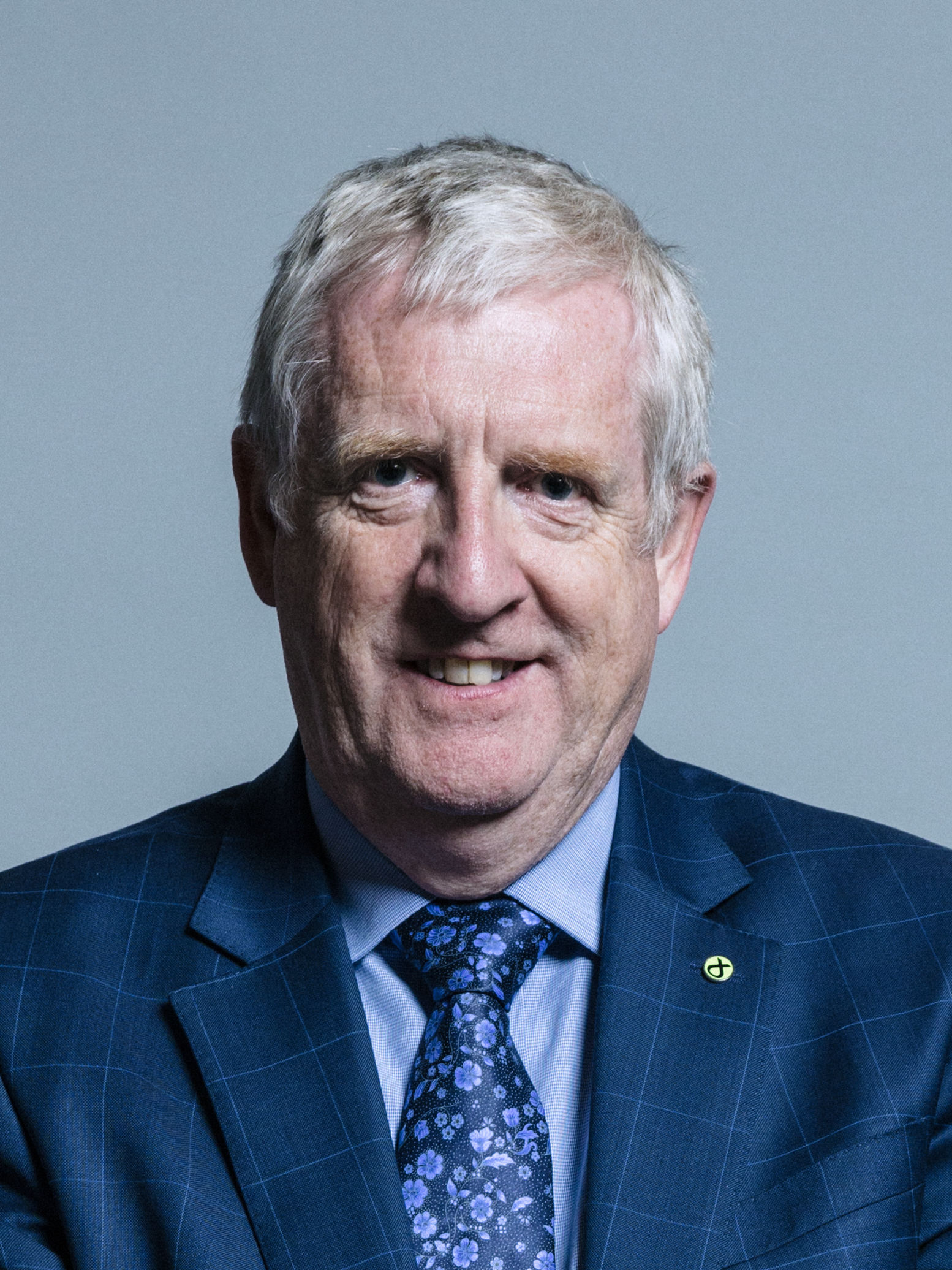
	First party	Second party
Candidate	Willie Rennie	Catherine Stihler
Party	Liberal Democrats	Labour
Popular vote	12,391	10,591
Percentage	35.8%	30.6%
Swing	▲15.6%	▼16.8%
	Third party	Fourth party
Candidate	Douglas Chapman	Carrie Ruxton
Party	SNP	Conservative
Popular vote	7,261	2,702
Percentage	21.0%	7.8%
Swing	▲2.1%	▼2.5%
MP before election
Rachel Squire
Labour
Elected MP
Willie Rennie
Liberal Democrats

A by-election for the United Kingdom parliamentary constituency of Dunfermline and West Fife was held on 9 February 2006, following the death of the incumbent Labour Party MP Rachel Squire. It was won by Willie Rennie of the Scottish Liberal Democrats, who gained the seat from Labour on a large swing of 16.2%.

It was the first time Labour had lost a seat at a Westminster by-election in Scotland since the 1988 Glasgow Govan by-election, and the first time Labour had ever lost to the Liberal Democrats, or their predecessors the Liberal Party, in a Scottish Westminster by-election. The by-election took place in the middle of a leadership election for the Liberal Democrats, and the party was perceived in the media to be declining in the polls as a result of negative publicity surrounding the resignation of former leader Charles Kennedy, as well as revelations about the private lives of Mark Oaten and Simon Hughes.

The constituency of Dunfermline and West Fife was first created for the United Kingdom Parliament at the 2005 general election and saw a comfortable Labour win at that election.

Labour gained the seat back at the 2010 general election, with the Liberal Democrats in second place.

== Campaign ==
Sitting Labour MP Rachel Squire died on 5 January 2006; she had served as an MP since 1992, mostly for Dunfermline and West Fife's predecessor seat until the 2005 general election. A by-election was subsequently called.

The Courier reported on 23 January that leaked minutes of a meeting on 11 January at Westminster revealed that "senior Scottish Liberal Democrats do not believe their party has any chance of winning the Dunfermline and West Fife by-election", and that "their aim is to beat the SNP rather than topple Labour". This suggestion was backed up on 27 January by a poll in The Daily Telegraph that put the Lib Dems at 13% UK-wide (down 9% on Election 2005), their worst position since the 2001 general election.

The Sunday Herald reported on 29 January that they had "evidence of a high-level "fix" to select (the Labour) candidate", because "party bosses sent out a leaflet on behalf of Catherine Stihler’s campaign hours before she was selected to fight the seat." This story followed earlier reports of a similar row over the selection of the Conservative and Unionist candidate: Fife Tory leader Stuart Randall's claim that he was left off the shortlist for being "far too old and middle-aged to fit the bill". Randall, who stood as Conservative candidate against Gordon Brown in Dunfermline East at the 2001 and 2005 general elections and fought Dunfermline East at the 2003 Scottish Parliament election, was aged only 43. Local Conservative activists were reported to be furious that such a high-profile local figure was left off the shortlist of candidates for the by-election.

The by-election electorate for the constituency was 72,225, a slight increase (of 2.04%) on the general election in May 2005.

== Implications (for UK and Scottish elections) ==
The constituency neighbours Kirkcaldy and Cowdenbeath, the seat of Gordon Brown, former Leader of the Labour Party and Prime Minister. Brown actually lived in the Dunfermline and West Fife constituency; he was Chancellor of the Exchequer at the time. The constituency is also near to North East Fife, then the constituency of Sir Menzies Campbell, Acting Leader of the Liberal Democrats at the time. Prior to the election, it was speculated that a poor showing for either party in the vicinity of Brown and/or Campbell's political bases could impact upon their chances of winning their respective parties' leaderships.

The result of this Westminster by-election were seen as a litmus test of the parties' standing prior to the 2007 Scottish Parliament election; the Liberal Democrats proceeded to win the Dunfermline West seat, which comprises the bulk of Dunfermline and West Fife, from Labour in the 2007 Holyrood election. The results of all by-elections in Scotland have been particularly highly valued by psephologists and political commentators since the demise of the last regular, monthly Scottish voting-intention poll (by The Herald and Taylor Nelson Sofres System 3) at the end of 2003. The result was also notable as it came at a time when Labour's national opinion poll ratings were very high.

Immediately following the election, the Liberal Democrats claimed that the result showed they were the challengers to the Labour Party, and that the Conservatives had failed their first electoral test under their new leader, David Cameron.

== Result ==
United Kingdom Parliament: Dunfermline and West Fife by-election 2006
Party	Candidate	Votes	%	±%
Liberal Democrats	Willie Rennie	12,391	35.8	+15.6
Labour	Catherine Stihler	10,591	30.6	−16.8
SNP	Douglas Chapman	7,261	21.0	+2.1
Conservative	Carrie Ruxton	2,702	7.8	−2.5
Scottish Socialist	John McAllion	537	1.6	0.0
Scottish Christian	George Hargreaves	411	1.2	New
Abolish Forth Bridge Tolls Party	Tom Minogue	374	1.1	New
UKIP	Ian Borland	208	0.6	−0.9
Common Good	Dick Rodgers	103	0.3	New
Majority		1,800	5.2	N/A
Turnout		34,578	47.9	−12.0
Liberal Democrats gain from Labour		Swing	+16.2	

== Previous result ==
General election 2005: Dunfermline and West Fife
Party	Candidate	Votes	%	±%
Labour	Rachel Squire	20,111	47.4	−7.1
Liberal Democrats	David Herbert	8,549	20.2	+5.9
SNP	Douglas Chapman	8,026	18.9	+1.1
Conservative	Roger Smillie	4,376	10.3	+0.6
Scottish Socialist	Susan Archibald	689	1.6	−0.8
UKIP	Ian Borland	643	1.5	+0.1
Majority		11,562	27.2	−12.9
Turnout		42,394	59.9	+2.3
Labour hold		Swing	-6.5	

== See also ==
- Elections in Scotland
- Politics of Scotland
