= Thomas Docherty (politician) =

British Labour Party politician

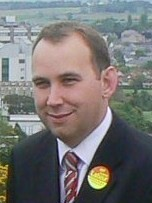
- Docherty in 2010

Shadow Deputy Leader of the House of Commons
- In office 15 April 2014 – 8 May 2015
- Leader: Ed Miliband
- Preceded by: Angela Smith
- Succeeded by: Nic Dakin

Member of Parliament for Dunfermline and West Fife
- In office 6 May 2010 – 30 March 2015
- Preceded by: Willie Rennie
- Succeeded by: Douglas Chapman

Personal details
- Born: 28 January 1975 (age 51)
- Party: Labour
- Spouse: Katie Docherty

Thomas Docherty (born 28 January 1975) is a British Labour Party politician who served as Member of Parliament (MP) for Dunfermline and West Fife from 2010 until 2015.

== Early life ==
Before becoming an MP, Docherty was an Account Director with a communications consultancy, having previously worked for Network Rail, BNFL and as a research assistant to Dunfermline West MSP Scott Barrie.

== Parliamentary career ==
Docherty was elected as the Member of Parliament for Dunfermline and West Fife in the May 2010 general election with a 5,470 majority. In 2011, he was a member of the special Select Committee set up to scrutinise the Bill that became the Armed Forces Act 2011. He was also a member of the Public Bill Committee for the Defence Reform Act 2014. Docherty proposed a Private Member's Bill aimed at banning discrimination against members of the Armed Forces and their families in 2014. The proposal was backed by shadow defence secretary Vernon Coaker but failed to progress Ed Miliband later suggested that a Labour government might introduce legislation along similar lines

Docherty also sat on the Administration Committee, Procedure Committee and the Environment, Food and Rural Affairs Committee at various times during the 2010-15 Parliament He was a shadow minister with responsibility for environment, food and rural affairs between 2013 and 2014, and in 2014 was appointed Shadow Deputy Leader of the House of Commons.

Having previously worked in political lobbying, he proposed a private member's bill in early 2013 which would have required lobbyists to sign a public register and code of conduct He criticised the government's own plans when they were unveiled later that year for excluding law firms. After the government's Transparency of Lobbying, Non-party Campaigning and Trade Union Administration Bill passed, Docherty introduced a private member's bill aiming at repealing it.

In January 2015, Docherty wrote to Culture Secretary Sajid Javid on Holocaust Memorial Day, suggesting a debate over banning Mein Kampf by Adolf Hitler. Docherty advocated for a national debate to put "limits on the freedom of expression." He said he didn't necessarily think it should be banned but thought it was important that such a debate took place.

Docherty was defeated at the 2015 general election, losing to Douglas Chapman, the Scottish National Party (SNP) candidate.

== Post parliamentary career ==
In January 2017, after Jamie Reed announced his resignation as MP for Copeland, Docherty put his name forward to stand in the following by-election, but was not selected.

In 2023, he was shortlisted to be the Labour prospective parliamentary candidate for Whitehaven and Workington in the 2024 general election, again failing to be selected.

== Personal life ==
Docherty has lived in Dunfermline with his wife Katie and their children and been a member of Dunfermline Round Table and supporter of Dunfermline Athletic F.C. He is a Roman Catholic.

Parliament of the United Kingdom
Preceded by Willie Rennie	Member of Parliament for Dunfermline and West Fife; 2010–2015	Succeeded by Douglas Chapman
