= Douglas Chapman (politician) =

Scottish SNP politician

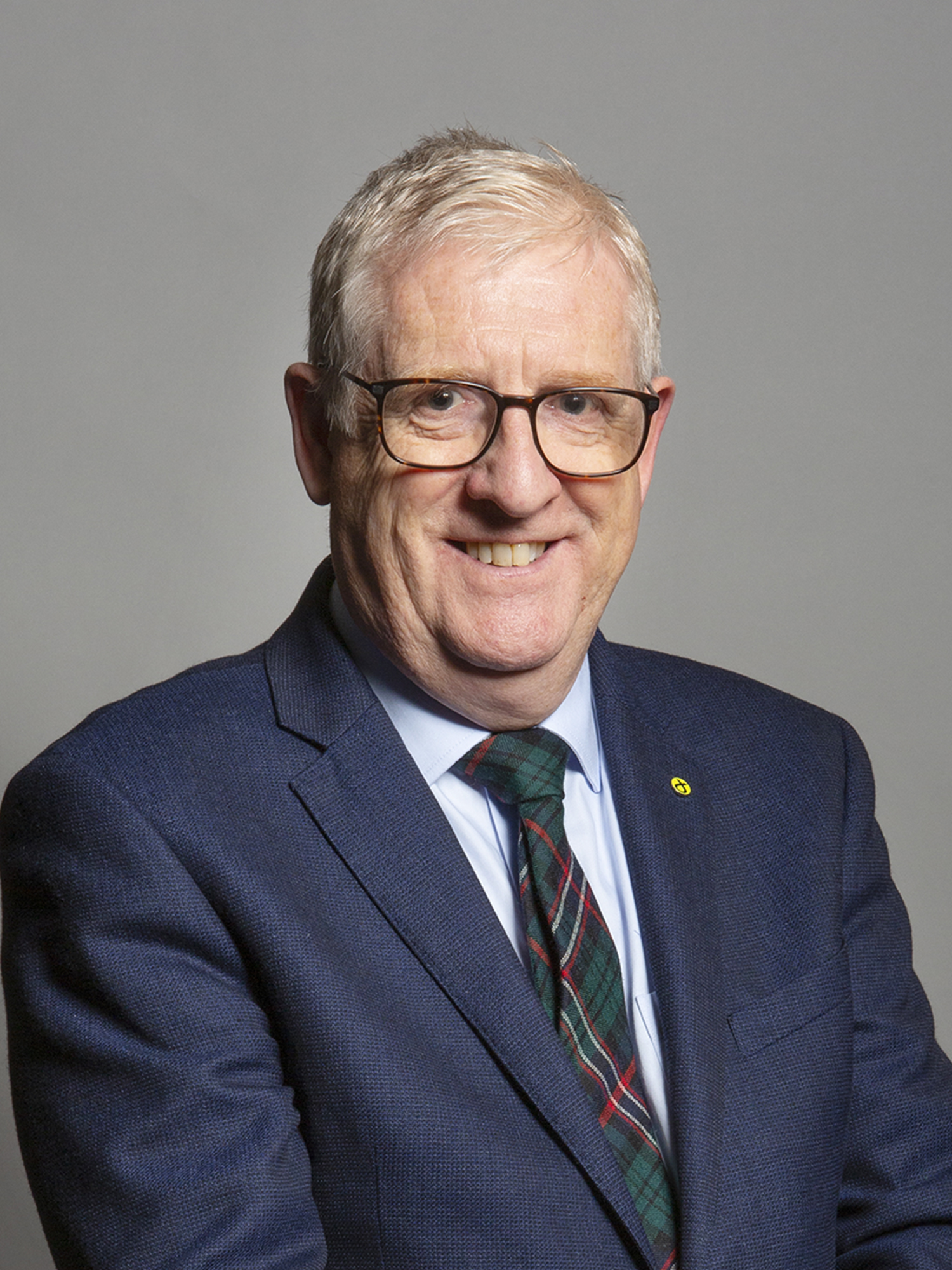
- Official portrait, 2019

Member of Parliament for Dunfermline and West Fife
- In office 7 May 2015 – 30 May 2024
- Preceded by: Thomas Docherty
- Succeeded by: Constituency abolished

Personal details
- Born: 5 January 1955 (age 71) Edinburgh, Scotland
- Party: Scottish National Party
- Education: Edinburgh Napier University

Douglas Chapman (born 5 January 1955) is a Scottish National Party (SNP) politician. He served as the Member of Parliament (MP) for Dunfermline and West Fife from the 2015 general election until he stood down at the 2024 general election. He served as the SNP's Small Business, Enterprise and Innovation spokesperson whilst in Parliament.

== Early life ==
Chapman was born in Edinburgh and grew up in Livingston and West Calder. He attended West Calder High School and has lived in the Dunfermline area since 1990, serving as a councillor for Rosyth and North Queensferry ward on Fife Council for nine years before becoming an MP.

== Political career ==
At the 2010 general election Chapman contested the Kirkcaldy and Cowdenbeath seat, but was defeated by the Labour Prime Minister Gordon Brown by over 23,000 votes. Five years later in Dunfermline and West Fife, however, he took 50.3% of the overall vote with a 39.6% swing from his Labour predecessor Thomas Docherty. It was his third attempt to take the seat, having been defeated in 2005 (coming third of six with 18.9%) and in a by-election in 2006 (coming third of nine with 21%). He retained his seat at the 2017 general election with a 35.5% share of the vote but a much reduced majority of only 844.

In the 2019 general election, Chapman held his seat, securing 23,727 votes. His nearest rival was Labour candidate Cara Hilton (who nearly defeated Chapman in 2017), who secured 13,028 votes.

In the 2020 SNP internal elections, Chapman was elected as SNP National Treasurer replacing Colin Beattie who had served for 16 years.

In May 2021 he resigned as SNP National Treasurer stating that he "had not received the support or financial information required to carry out the fiduciary duties of National Treasurer."

Between July 2018 and November 2019, Chapman was a member of the Public Accounts Committee, which examines the value for money of government projects, programmes, and service delivery.

Chapman was a member of the UK Delegation to the NATO Parliamentary Assembly from 2017 to 2020. For a period, he was the only Scottish MP on the assembly.

On 27 June 2023, he announced he would stand down at the 2024 general election.

=== West Fife rail line ===
Chapman is an active and long-standing campaigner for the reopening of the West Fife railway line to passenger trains. The stretch of line between Alloa and Dunfermline was previously used for freight but has been lying largely unused since the closure of Longannet Power Station in 2016. Chapman has repeatedly urged Scotland's transport ministers to reopen the line, citing the benefits it could bring to communities in West Fife and further afield.

=== Nordic/Arctic Councils/Regions ===
Douglas is a supporter of efforts to forge greater relations between Scotland and the Nordic countries. Following the first coronavirus lockdown in June 2020, he wrote an article highlighting the Scottish Government's efforts to foster relations with its Nordic neighbours, which said: "Now that the world has been turned upside down by the horror of this pandemic, connections with these smaller northern nations seem all the more important in terms of what we can learn from their individual responses to the crisis."

In 2021, Chapman established the All-Party Parliamentary Group for the Arctic and Nordic Councils. Chapman said the purpose of the group was to help elected members in both the House of Commons and the House of Lords to better understand both bodies and the vital work they do in the High North. In an article for the National, he also said: "There’s never been a more important time for Scotland and the UK to cement our alliances with these Councils as we grapple with the major challenges of the COVID-19 pandemic, Brexit and the enormity of the climate crisis."

== Controversies ==
In August 2019, as the SNP's Spokesperson on Defence Procurement, Peace & Nuclear Disarmament, Chapman claimed without presenting any evidence, that the British Army's 77th Brigade was involved in "attacking and undermining [the] democratic choices" of the Scottish people. It was claimed that this tweet itself could have been the product of Russian propaganda, with Chapman either being intentionally or unwittingly involved.

== Personal life ==
He is married with two children, and supports Hibernian FC.

Parliament of the United Kingdom
| Preceded by Thomas Docherty | Member of Parliament for Dunfermline and West Fife; 2015–2024 | Constituency abolished |
