= Dunfermline and West Fife =

UK Parliament constituency (2005–2024)

Coordinates: 56.057°N 3.430°W

- Former county constituency for the House of Commons
- Boundary of Dunfermline and West Fife in Scotland
- Major settlements: Dunfermline, Inverkeithing, North Queensferry, Rosyth

2005–2024
- Created from: Dunfermline West and Dunfermline East

Dunfermline and West Fife was a county constituency represented in the House of Commons of the Parliament of the United Kingdom. It was created for the 2005 general election from all of the old Dunfermline West and parts of the old Dunfermline East constituencies. Its last MP was Douglas Chapman of the Scottish National Party (SNP).

The Dunfermline and West Fife by-election was held in early 2006, due to the death of the sitting MP, Rachel Squire. Willie Rennie of the Liberal Democrats was the surprise winner, by some 1,800 votes, in what was seen as a safe Labour seat. However, he lost the seat to Labour's Thomas Docherty at the 2010 general election. Chapman then won the seat in the SNP's Scottish landslide in the 2015 general election.

Further to the completion of the 2023 periodic review of Westminster constituencies, the seat was subject to boundary changes which will include the small town of Dollar in Clackmannanshire. As a consequence, it was renamed Dunfermline and Dollar, first contested at the 2024 general election. Graeme Downie, of The Scottish Labour Party successfully was elected as the Member of Parliament for Dunfermline and Dollar on Thursday 4th July 2024.

== Boundaries ==
Map of boundaries 2005–2024

This constituency was formed in 2005 from all of the old Dunfermline West and parts of the old Dunfermline East constituencies.

Rosyth and Inverkeithing in the southeast are the only large population centres on the coast. To the north and west of Dunfermline is more rugged and robust Fife countryside. The whole seat was up against the Firth of Forth.

== Places in Dunfermline and West Fife constituency ==
=== Royal burghs ===
- Dunfermline - Population: 55,000
- Inverkeithing - Population: 4,820
- Culross - Population: 395 (2006)

=== Burghs, towns, and large villages (Over 1,000 population) ===
- Rosyth - Population: 13,570
- Kincardine on Forth - Population: 2,940
- Crossgates - Population: 2,830
- Cairneyhill - Population: 2,510
- Crossford - Population: 2,320
- Valleyfield - Population: 2,280
- Oakley - Population: 2,240
- Limekilns - Population: 1,450
- Saline - Population: 1,370
- Townhill - Population: 1,160
- North Queensferry - Population: 1,050
- Torryburn - Population: 1,030

=== Electoral wards of Dunfermline and small, outlying villages ===
- Baldridgeburn (Ward of Dunfermline)
- Bellyeoman (Ward of Dunfermline)
- Brucefield (Ward of Dunfermline)
- Carnegie (Ward of Dunfermline)
- Garvock (Ward of Dunfermline
- Halbeath (Ward of Dunfermline)
- Headwell (Ward of Dunfermline)
- Linburn (Ward of Dunfermline)
- Milesmark (Ward of Dunfermline)
- Mossside (Ward of Dunfermline)
- Netherton (Ward of Dunfermline)
- Pitcorthie (Ward of Dunfermline)
- Pitreavie (Ward of Dunfermline)
- Woodmill (Ward of Dunfermline)
- Blairhall - Population: 930
- Hill of Beath - Population: 875
- Kingseat - Population: 860
- Comrie - Population: 830
- Carnock - Population: 790
- Wellwood - Population: 608
- Crombie - Population: 374
- Steelend - Population: 320
- Gowkhall - Population: 220

== Members of Parliament ==
Rachel Squire (Labour) was the MP for Dunfermline West constituency from 1992 until the major revision of the composition of Scottish parliamentary constituencies for the 2005 general election. Gordon Brown was MP for the neighbouring Dunfermline East constituency from which some territory was given to Dunfermline and West Fife.

Squire won the new seat in the 2005 general election and held it until her death on 5 January 2006. The subsequent by-election was held on 9 February 2006, which Liberal Democrat Willie Rennie won in a shock defeat for Labour. The Liberal Democrats also gained the Dunfermline West Scottish Parliamentary constituency from Labour in the 2007 Holyrood Parliament elections.

In the 2010 general election, the Labour candidate Thomas Docherty won the seat back. In the 2015 general election the seat was won by the SNP's Douglas Chapman.

Election	Member	Party
2005	Rachel Squire	Labour
2006 by-election	Willie Rennie	Liberal Democrat
2010	Thomas Docherty	Labour
2015	Douglas Chapman	SNP

== Election results ==
=== Elections in the 2010s ===
2019 general election: Dunfermline and West Fife
Party	Candidate	Votes	%	±%
SNP	Douglas Chapman	23,727	44.4	+8.9
Labour Co-op	Cara Hilton	13,028	24.4	−9.5
Conservative	Moira Benny	11,207	21.0	−3.7
Liberal Democrats	Rebecca Bell	4,262	8.0	+2.1
Green	Mags Hall	1,258	2.4	New
Majority		10,699	20.0	+18.4
Turnout		53,482	69.8	+2.4
SNP hold		Swing	+9.2	

2017 general election: Dunfermline and West Fife
Party	Candidate	Votes	%	±%
SNP	Douglas Chapman	18,121	35.5	−14.8
Labour Co-op	Cara Hilton	17,277	33.9	+2.2
Conservative	Belinda Hacking	12,593	24.7	+12.8
Liberal Democrats	James Calder	3,019	5.9	+1.9
Majority		844	1.6	−17.0
Turnout		51,010	67.4	−4.2
SNP hold		Swing	-8.4	

2015 general election: Dunfermline and West Fife
Party	Candidate	Votes	%	±%
SNP	Douglas Chapman	28,096	50.3	+39.7
Labour	Thomas Docherty	17,744	31.7	−14.6
Conservative	James Reekie	6,623	11.9	+5.1
Liberal Democrats	Gillian Cole-Hamilton	2,232	4.0	−31.1
Green	Lewis Campbell	1,195	2.1	New
Majority		10,352	18.6	N/A
Turnout		55,890	71.6	+5.2
SNP gain from Labour		Swing	+27.1	

2010 general election: Dunfermline and West Fife
Party	Candidate	Votes	%	±%
Labour	Thomas Docherty	22,639	46.3	−1.1
Liberal Democrats	Willie Rennie	17,169	35.1	+14.9
SNP	Joe McCall	5,201	10.6	−8.3
Conservative	Belinda Hacking	3,305	6.8	−3.5
UKIP	Otto Inglis	633	1.3	−0.2
Majority		5,470	11.2	−16.0
Turnout		48,947	66.4	+6.5
Labour hold		Swing		

=== Elections in the 2000s ===
2006 by-election: Dunfermline and West Fife
Party	Candidate	Votes	%	±%
Liberal Democrats	Willie Rennie	12,391	35.8	+15.6
Labour	Catherine Stihler	10,591	30.6	−16.8
SNP	Douglas Chapman	7,261	21.0	+2.1
Conservative	Carrie Ruxton	2,702	7.8	−2.5
Scottish Socialist	John McAllion	537	1.6	0.0
Scottish Christian	George Hargreaves	411	1.2	New
Abolish Forth Bridge Tolls Party	Tom Minogue	374	1.1	New
UKIP	Ian Borland	208	0.6	−0.9
Common Good	Dick Rodgers	103	0.3	New
Majority		1,800	5.2	N/A
Turnout		34,578	47.9	−12.0
Liberal Democrats gain from Labour		Swing	+16.24	

2005 general election: Dunfermline and Fife West
Party	Candidate	Votes	%	±%
Labour	Rachel Squire	20,111	47.4	−7.1
Liberal Democrats	David Herbert	8,549	20.2	+5.9
SNP	Douglas Chapman	8,026	18.9	+1.1
Conservative	Roger Smillie	4,376	10.3	+0.6
Scottish Socialist	Susan Archibald	689	1.6	−0.8
UKIP	Ian Borland	643	1.5	+0.1
Majority		11,562	27.2	−13.0
Turnout		42,394	59.9	+2.3
Labour hold		Swing	-6.5	
