= List of MPs for constituencies in Scotland (1955–1959) =

- Colours on map indicate the party allegiance of each constituency's MP.

This is a list of the 71 members of Parliament (MPs) elected to the House of Commons of the United Kingdom by Scottish constituencies for the Forty-first parliament of the United Kingdom (1955–1959) at the 1955 United Kingdom general election.

As of 2024, this was the last election in which the Conservative and Unionist Party won the largest number of votes in Scotland and the most seats in the country.

== Composition ==
Affiliation	Members
Scottish Labour Party	34
Unionist Party	30
National Liberal	6
Scottish Liberal Party	1
Total	71

== List ==
MP	Constituency	Party	In constituency since
Hector Hughes	Aberdeen North	Labour Party	1945
Priscilla Buchan	Aberdeen South	Unionist Party	1946 by-election
Robert Boothby	Aberdeenshire East	Unionist Party	1950
Henry Spence	Aberdeenshire West	Unionist Party	1950
Colin Thornton-Kemsley	Angus North and Mearns	National Liberal	1950
James Duncan	Angus South	National Liberal	1950
Duncan McCallum	Argyll	Unionist Party	1950
Thomas Moore	Ayr	Unionist Party	1950
Douglas Spencer-Nairn	Ayrshire Central	Unionist Party	1955
Charles MacAndrew	Ayrshire North and Bute	Unionist Party	1935
Emrys Hughes	Ayrshire South	Labour Party	1946 by-election
William Duthie	Banffshire	Unionist Party	1945
Antony Lambton, Viscount Lambton	Berwick and East Lothian	Unionist Party	1951
John Timmons	Bothwell	Labour Party	1945
David Robertson	Caithness and Sutherland	Unionist Party	1950
Jean Mann	Coatbridge and Airdrie	Labour Party	1950
Niall Macpherson	Dumfriesshire	National Liberal	1945
Cyril Bence	Dunbartonshire East	Labour Party	1951
Tom Steele	Dunbartonshire West	Labour Party	1950 by-election
George Thomson	Dundee East	Labour Party	1952 by-election
John Strachey	Dundee West	Labour Party	1950
James Clunie	Dunfermline Burghs	Labour Party	1950
Tom Oswald	Edinburgh Central	Labour Party	1951
George Willis (politician)	Edinburgh East	Labour Party	1954 by-election
James Hoy	Edinburgh Leith	Labour Party	1950
William Milligan	Edinburgh North	Unionist Party	1955
John Hope	Edinburgh Pentlands	Unionist Party	1950
William Darling	Edinburgh South	Unionist Party	1945
Ian Clark Hutchison	Edinburgh West	Unionist Party	1941 by-election
James Henderson-Stewart	Fife East	National Liberal	1933 by-election
Willie Hamilton	Fife West	Labour Party	1950
John Mackie	Galloway	Unionist Party	1931
James Carmichael	Glasgow Bridgeton	Labour Party	1946 by-election
John Henderson	Glasgow Cathcart	Unionist Party	1946 by-election
James McInnes	Glasgow Central	Labour Party	1950
Jack Browne	Glasgow Craigton	Unionist Party	1955
Alice Cullen	Glasgow Gorbals	Labour Party	1948 by-election
John Rankin	Glasgow Govan	Labour Party	1955
Tam Galbraith	Glasgow Hillhead	Unionist Party	1948 by-election
Walter Elliot	Glasgow Kelvingrove	Unionist Party	1950
William Hannan	Glasgow Maryhill	Labour Party	1945
John George	Glasgow Pollok	Unionist Party	1955
William Reid	Glasgow Provan	Labour Party	1955
James Hutchison	Glasgow Scotstoun	Unionist Party	1950
John McGovern	Glasgow Shettleston	Labour Party	1930 by-election
John Forman	Glasgow Springburn	Labour Party	1945
William Grant	Glasgow Woodside	Unionist Party	1955
Hector McNeil	Greenock	Labour Party	1941 by-election
Tom Fraser	Hamilton	Labour Party	1943 by-election
Billy McLean	Inverness	Unionist Party	1954 by-election
William Ross	Kilmarnock	Labour Party	1946 by-election
Gilmour Leburn	Kinross and Western Perthshire	Unionist Party	1955
Thomas Hubbard	Kirkcaldy Burghs	Labour Party	1944 by-election
Patrick Maitland	Lanark	Unionist Party	1951
Peggy Herbison	Lanarkshire North	Labour Party	1945
David Pryde	Midlothian	Labour Party	1955
James Stuart	Moray and Nairn	Unionist Party	1923
George Lawson	Motherwell	Labour Party	1954 by-election
Jo Grimond	Orkney and Shetland	Liberal Party	1950
Douglas Johnston	Paisley	Labour Party	1948 by-election
Alan Gomme-Duncan	Perth and East Perthshire	Unionist Party	1950
Guy Lloyd	Renfrewshire East	Unionist Party	1940 by-election
John Maclay	Renfrewshire West	National Liberal	1950
John MacLeod	Ross and Cromarty	National Liberal	1945
Charles Donaldson	Roxburgh, Selkirk and Peebles	Unionist Party	1951
Richard Brooman-White	Rutherglen	Unionist Party	1951
Malcolm MacPherson	Stirling and Falkirk	Labour Party	1948 by-election
Arthur Woodburn	Stirlingshire East and Clackmannan	Labour Party	1939 by-election
Alfred Balfour	Stirlingshire West	Labour Party	1945
John Taylor	West Lothian	Labour Party	1951
Malcolm Macmillan	Western Isles	Labour Party	1935

== By-elections ==
There were six by-elections during this period:

By-election	Date	Incumbent	Party	Winner	Party	Cause
Greenock	8 December 1955	Hector McNeil	Labour	Dickson Mabon	Labour	Death
Edinburgh South	29 May 1957	William Darling	Unionist	Michael Hutchison	Unionist	Resignation
Glasgow Kelvingrove	13 March 1958	Walter Elliot	Unionist	Mary McAlister	Labour	Death
Argyll	12 June 1958	Duncan McCallum	Unionist	Michael Noble	Unionist	Death
East Aberdeenshire	20 November 1958	Robert Boothby	Unionist	Patrick Wolrige-Gordon	Unionist	Elevation to a life peerage
Galloway	9 April 1959	John Mackie	Unionist	John Brewis	Unionist	Death

== See also ==
- 1955 United Kingdom general election
