= List of MPs elected in the 1955 United Kingdom general election =

1955–1959 Parliament of the United Kingdom
←	1951–1955 Parliament	1959–1964 Parliament	→
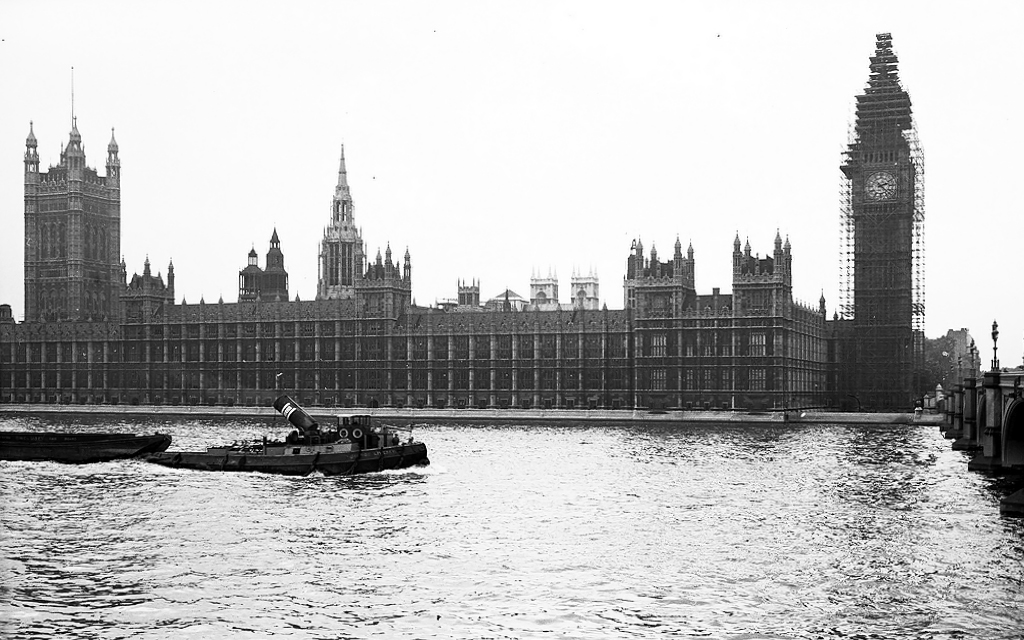
- Palace of Westminster in 1955

Overview
- Legislative body: Parliament of the United Kingdom
- Term: 26 May 1955 – 16 October 1959
- Election: 1955 United Kingdom general election
- Government: Eden ministry First Macmillan ministry

House of Commons
- Members: 630
- Speaker: William Morrison
- Leader: Harry Crookshank; R. A. Butler
- Prime Minister: Anthony Eden; Harold Macmillan
- Leader of the Opposition: Herbert Morrison; Hugh Gaitskell
- Third-party leader: Clement Davies; Jo Grimond

House of Lords
- Lord Chancellor: Viscount Kilmuir

Crown-in-Parliament Elizabeth II

Sessions
- 1st: 7 June 1955 – 5 November 1956
- 2nd: 6 November 1956 – 1 November 1957
- 3rd: 5 November 1957 – 23 October 1958
- 4th: 28 October 1958 – 18 September 1959

This is a list of members of Parliament elected to the Parliament of the United Kingdom at the 1955 general election, held on 26 May 1955. A total of 630 MPs were elected.

Notable newcomers to the House of Commons included William Whitelaw and Geoffrey Rippon.

== By nation ==
- List of MPs for constituencies in Scotland (1955–1959)
- List of MPs for constituencies in Wales (1955–1959)

== Composition ==
These representative diagrams show the composition of the parties in the 1955 general election.

Note: This is not the official seating plan of the House of Commons, which has five rows of benches on each side, with the government party to the right of the speaker and opposition parties to the left, but with room for only around two-thirds of MPs to sit at any one time.

This table shows the number of MPs in each party:

Affiliation		Members	
Affiliation		At 1955 election	At dissolution
●	Conservative Party	325	325
	Unionist Party	30	29
	Ulster Unionist Party	10	12
	Labour Party	277	281
●	National Liberal Party	19	17
	Liberal Party	6	6
	Sinn Féin	2	0
	Speaker	1	1
Total		630	630
Effective government majority		62	60

== List of MPs ==
Constituency	MP	Party
Aberavon	William Cove	Labour (Wales)
Aberdare	Arthur Probert	Labour (Wales)
Aberdeen North	Hector Hughes	Labour (Scotland)
Aberdeen South	Lady Tweedsmuir	Conservative (Unionist Party)
Aberdeenshire East	Robert Boothby	Conservative (Unionist Party)
Aberdeenshire West	Henry Spence	Conservative (Unionist Party)
Abertillery	Llywelyn Williams	Labour (Wales)
Abingdon	Airey Neave	Conservative
Accrington	Harry Hynd	Labour
Acton	Joseph Sparks	Labour
Aldershot	Eric Errington	Conservative
Altrincham and Sale	Frederick Erroll	Conservative
Anglesey	Cledwyn Hughes	Labour (Wales)
Angus North and Mearns	Colin Thornton-Kemsley	National Liberal
Angus South	James Duncan	National Liberal
Antrim North	Hon. Phelim O'Neill	Conservative (Ulster Unionist Party)
Antrim South	Knox Cunningham	Conservative (Ulster Unionist Party)
Argyll	Duncan McCallum	Conservative (Unionist Party)
Armagh	C. W. Armstrong	Conservative (Ulster Unionist Party)
Arundel and Shoreham	Henry Kerby	Conservative
Ashfield	William Warbey	Labour
Ashford	Bill Deedes	Conservative
Ashton-under-Lyne	Hervey Rhodes	Labour
Aylesbury	Spencer Summers	Conservative
Ayr	Thomas Moore	Conservative (Unionist Party)
Ayrshire Central	Douglas Spencer-Nairn	Conservative (Unionist Party)
Ayrshire North and Bute	Charles MacAndrew, PC	Conservative (Unionist Party)
Ayrshire South	Emrys Hughes	Labour (Scotland)
Banbury	Douglas Dodds-Parker	Conservative
Banffshire	William Duthie	Conservative (Unionist Party)
Barking	Somerville Hastings	Labour
Barkston Ash	Leonard Ropner	Conservative
Barnet	Reginald Maudling	Conservative
Barnsley	Roy Mason	Labour
Barons Court	Thomas Williams	Labour
Barrow-in-Furness	Walter Monslow	Labour
Barry	Raymond Gower	Conservative (Wales)
Basingstoke	Denzil Freeth	Conservative
Bassetlaw	Fred Bellenger	Labour
Bath	James Pitman	Conservative
Batley and Morley	Alfred Broughton	Labour
Battersea North	Douglas Jay	Labour
Battersea South	Ernest Partridge	Conservative
Bebington	Hendrie Oakshott	Conservative
Beckenham	Patrick Buchan-Hepburn	Conservative
Bedford	Christopher Soames	Conservative
Bedfordshire, Mid	Alan Lennox-Boyd	Conservative
Bedfordshire South	Norman Cole	National Liberal
Bedwellty	Harold Finch	Labour (Wales)
Belfast East	Alan McKibbin	Conservative (Ulster Unionist Party)
Belfast North	Montgomery Hyde	Conservative (Ulster Unionist Party)
Belfast South	David Campbell	Conservative (Ulster Unionist Party)
Belfast West	Patricia McLaughlin	Conservative (Ulster Unionist Party)
Belper	George Brown	Labour
Bermondsey	Bob Mellish	Labour
Berwick and East Lothian	William Anstruther-Gray	Conservative
Berwick upon Tweed	Viscount Lambton	Conservative (Unionist Party)
Bethnal Green	Percy Holman	Labour
Bexley	Edward Heath	Conservative
Billericay	Richard Body	Conservative
Bilston	Robert Edwards	Labour
Birkenhead	Percy Collick	Labour
Birmingham All Saints	Denis Howell	Labour
Birmingham Aston	Julius Silverman	Labour
Birmingham Edgbaston	Edith Pitt	Conservative
Birmingham Hall Green	Aubrey Jones	Conservative
Birmingham Handsworth	Edward Boyle	Conservative
Birmingham Ladywood	Victor Yates	Labour
Birmingham Northfield	Donald Chapman	Labour
Birmingham Perry Barr	Charles Howell	Labour
Birmingham Selly Oak	Harold Gurden	Conservative
Birmingham Small Heath	William Wheeldon	Labour
Birmingham Sparkbrook	Percy Shurmer	Labour
Birmingham Stechford	Roy Jenkins	Labour
Birmingham Yardley	Henry Usborne	Labour
Bishop Auckland	Hugh Dalton	Labour
Blackburn	Barbara Castle	Labour
Blackpool North	Toby Low	Conservative
Blackpool South	Roland Robinson	Conservative
Blaydon	William Whiteley	Labour
Blyth	Alfred Robens	Labour
Bodmin	Douglas Marshall	Conservative
Bolsover	Harold Neal	Labour
Bolton East	Philip Bell	Conservative
Bolton West	Arthur Holt	Liberal
Bootle	Simon Mahon	Labour
Bosworth	Arthur Allen	Labour
Bothwell	John Timmons	Labour (Scotland)
Bournemouth East and Christchurch	Nigel Nicolson	Conservative
Bournemouth West	John Eden	Conservative
Bradford East	Frank McLeavy	Labour
Bradford North	William Taylor	National Liberal
Bradford South	George Craddock	Labour
Bradford West	Arthur Tiley	National Liberal
Brecon and Radnor	Tudor Watkins	Labour (Wales)
Brentford and Chiswick	Percy Lucas	Conservative
Bridgwater	Gerald Wills	Conservative
Bridlington	Hon. Richard Wood	Conservative
Brierley Hill	Charles Simmons	Labour
Brigg	Lance Mallalieu	Labour
Brighouse and Spenborough	John Edwards	Labour
Brighton Kemptown	Howard Johnson	Conservative
Brighton Pavilion	William Teeling	Conservative
Bristol Central	Stan Awbery	Labour
Bristol North East	William Coldrick	Labour
Bristol North West	Thomas Christopher Boyd	Labour
Bristol South	William A. Wilkins	Labour
Bristol South East	Tony Benn	Labour
Bristol West	Walter Monckton	Conservative
Brixton	Marcus Lipton	Labour
Bromley	Harold Macmillan	Conservative
Bromsgrove	James Dance	Conservative
Buckingham	Frank Markham	Conservative
Buckinghamshire South	Ronald Bell	Conservative
Burnley	Wilfrid Burke	Labour
Burton	John Jennings	Conservative
Bury and Radcliffe	John Bidgood	Conservative
Bury St Edmunds	William Aitken	Conservative
Caernarfon	Goronwy Roberts	Labour (Wales)
Caerphilly	Ness Edwards	Labour (Wales)
Caithness and Sutherland	David Robertson	Conservative (Unionist Party)
Cambridge	Hamilton Kerr	Conservative
Cambridgeshire	Gerald Howard	Conservative
Cannock	Jennie Lee	Labour
Canterbury	Leslie Thomas	Conservative
Cardiff North	David Llewellyn	Conservative (Wales)
Cardiff South East	James Callaghan	Labour (Wales)
Cardiff West	George Thomas	Labour (Wales)
Cardiganshire	Roderic Bowen	Liberal
Carlisle	Donald Johnson	Conservative
Carlton	Kenneth Pickthorn	Conservative
Carmarthen	Rhys Hopkin Morris	Liberal
Carshalton	Antony Head	Conservative
Cheadle	William Shepherd	Conservative
Chelmsford	Hubert Ashton	Conservative
Chelsea	Allan Noble	Conservative
Cheltenham	William W. Hicks Beach	Conservative
Chertsey	Lionel Heald	Conservative
Chester, City of	Basil Nield	Conservative
Chesterfield	George Benson	Labour
Chester-le-Street	Patrick Bartley	Labour
Chichester	Lancelot Joynson-Hicks	Conservative
Chigwell	John Biggs-Davison	Conservative
Chippenham	David Eccles	Conservative
Chislehurst	Patricia Hornsby-Smith	Conservative
Chorley	Clifford Kenyon	Labour
Cirencester and Tewkesbury	William Morrison	Speaker
Cities of London and Westminster	H. Webbe	Conservative
Clapham	Charles Gibson	Labour
Cleveland	Arthur Palmer	Labour
Clitheroe	Richard Fort	Conservative
Coatbridge and Airdrie	Jean Mann	Labour (Scotland)
Colchester	Cuthbert Alport	Conservative
Colne Valley	Glenvil Hall	Labour
Consett	William Stones	Labour
Conway	Peter Thomas	Conservative (Wales)
Cornwall, North	Harold Roper	Conservative
Coventry East	Richard Crossman	Labour
Coventry North	Maurice Edelman	Labour
Coventry South	Elaine Burton	Labour
Crewe	Scholefield Allen	Labour
Crosby	Graham Page	Conservative
Croydon North-East	John Hughes-Hallett	Conservative
Croydon North-West	Fred Harris	Conservative
Croydon South	Richard Thompson	Conservative
Dagenham	John Parker	Labour
Darlington	Fergus Graham	Conservative
Dartford	Sydney Irving	Labour
Darwen	Charles Fletcher-Cooke	Conservative
Dearne Valley	Wilfred Paling	Labour
Denbigh	Emlyn Garner Evans	National Liberal
Deptford	Leslie Plummer	Labour
Derby North	Clifford Wilcock	Labour
Derby South	Philip Noel-Baker	Labour
Derbyshire North East	Henry White	Labour
Derbyshire South East	Arthur Champion	Labour
Derbyshire West	Edward Wakefield	Conservative
Devizes	H. Percivall Pott	Conservative
Devon, North	Hon. James Lindsay	Conservative
Dewsbury	William Paling	Labour
Don Valley	Tom Williams	Labour
Doncaster	Anthony Barber	Conservative
Dorking	Gordon Touche	Conservative
Dorset North	Robert Crouch	Conservative
Dorset South	Victor Montagu	Conservative
Dorset West	Simon Wingfield Digby	Conservative
Dover	John Arbuthnot	Conservative
Down North	George Currie	Conservative (Ulster Unionist Party)
Down South	Lawrence Orr	Conservative (Ulster Unionist Party)
Dudley	George Wigg	Labour
Dulwich	Robert Jenkins	Conservative
Dumfriesshire	Niall Macpherson	National Liberal
Dunbartonshire East	Cyril Bence	Labour (Scotland)
Dunbartonshire West	Tom Steele	Labour (Scotland)
Dundee East	George Thomson	Labour (Scotland)
Dundee West	John Strachey	Labour (Scotland)
Dunfermline Burghs	James Clunie	Labour
Durham	Charles Grey	Labour
Durham North West	William Ainsley	Labour
Ealing North	John Barter	Conservative
Ealing South	Angus Maude	Conservative
Easington	Manny Shinwell	Labour
East Grinstead	Evelyn Emmet	Conservative
East Ham North	Percy Daines	Labour
East Ham South	Albert Oram	Labour
Eastbourne	Charles Taylor	Conservative
Eastleigh	David Price	Conservative
Ebbw Vale	Aneurin Bevan	Labour (Wales)
Eccles	William Proctor	Labour
Edinburgh Central	Thomas Oswald	Labour (Scotland)
Edinburgh East	George Willis	Labour (Scotland)
Edinburgh Leith	James Hoy	Labour (Scotland)
Edinburgh North	William Rankine Milligan	Conservative (Unionist Party)
Edinburgh Pentlands	Lord John Hope	Conservative (Unionist Party)
Edinburgh South	William Darling	Conservative (Unionist Party)
Edinburgh West	Ian Hutchison	Conservative (Unionist Party)
Edmonton	Austen Albu	Labour
Enfield East	Ernest Davies	Labour
Enfield West	Iain Macleod	Conservative
Epping	Graeme Finlay	Conservative
Epsom	Peter Rawlinson	Conservative
Erith and Crayford	Norman Dodds	Labour
Esher	William Robson Brown	Conservative
Essex South East	Bernard Braine	Conservative
Eton and Slough	Fenner Brockway	Labour
Exeter	Rolf Dudley-Williams	Conservative
Eye	Harwood Harrison	Conservative
Falmouth and Camborne	Frank Hayman	Labour
Farnham	Godfrey Nicholson	Conservative
Farnworth	Ernest Thornton	Labour
Faversham	Percy Wells	Labour
Feltham	Albert Hunter	Labour
Fermanagh and South Tyrone	Philip Clarke	Sinn Féin
Fife East	James Henderson-Stewart	National Liberal
Fife West	Willie Hamilton	Labour (Scotland)
Finchley	John Crowder	Conservative
Flint East	Eirene White	Labour (Wales)
Flint West	Nigel Birch	Conservative (Wales)
Folkestone and Hythe	Harry Mackeson	Conservative
Fulham	Michael Stewart	Labour
Fylde North	Hon. Richard Stanley	Conservative
Fylde South	Claude Lancaster	Conservative
Gainsborough	Harry Crookshank	Conservative
Galloway	John Mackie	Conservative (Unionist Party)
Gateshead East	Arthur Moody	Labour
Gateshead West	John Hall	Labour
Gillingham	Frederick Burden	Conservative
Glasgow Bridgeton	James Carmichael	Labour (Scotland)
Glasgow Cathcart	John Henderson	Conservative (Unionist Party)
Glasgow Central	James McInnes	Labour (Scotland)
Glasgow Craigton	Jack Browne	Conservative (Unionist Party)
Glasgow Gorbals	Alice Cullen	Labour (Scotland)
Glasgow Govan	John Rankin	Labour (Scotland)
Glasgow Hillhead	Hon. Tam Galbraith	Conservative (Unionist Party)
Glasgow Kelvingrove	Walter Elliot	Conservative (Unionist Party)
Glasgow Maryhill	William Hannan	Labour (Scotland)
Glasgow Pollok	John George	Conservative (Unionist Party)
Glasgow Provan	William Reid	Labour (Scotland)
Glasgow Scotstoun	James Hutchison	Conservative (Unionist Party)
Glasgow Shettleston	John McGovern	Labour (Scotland)
Glasgow Springburn	John Forman	Labour (Scotland)
Glasgow Woodside	William Grant	Conservative (Unionist Party)
Gloucester	Moss Turner-Samuels	Labour
Gloucestershire South	Frederick Corfield	Conservative
Gloucestershire West	M. Philips Price	Labour
Goole	George Jeger	Labour
Gosport and Fareham	Reginald Bennett	Conservative
Gower	David Grenfell	Labour (Wales)
Grantham	Joseph Godber	Conservative
Gravesend	Peter Kirk	Conservative
Greenock	Hector McNeil	Labour (Scotland)
Greenwich	Joseph Reeves	Labour
Grimsby	Kenneth Younger	Labour
Guildford	Richard Nugent	Conservative
Hackney Central	Herbert Butler	Labour
Hackney North and Stoke Newington	David Weitzman	Labour
Halifax	Maurice Macmillan	Conservative
Haltemprice	Patrick Wall	Conservative
Hamilton	Tom Fraser	Labour (Scotland)
Hammersmith North	Frank Tomney	Labour
Hampstead	Henry Brooke	Conservative
Harborough	John Baldock	Conservative
Harrogate	James Ramsden	Conservative
Harrow Central	Patrick Bishop	Conservative
Harrow East	Ian Harvey	Conservative
Harrow West	Albert Braithwaite	Conservative
The Hartlepools	D. T. Jones	Labour
Harwich	Julian Ridsdale	National Liberal
Hastings	Neill Cooper-Key	Conservative
Hayes and Harlington	Arthur Skeffington	Labour
Hemel Hempstead	Viscountess Davidson	Conservative
Hemsworth	Horace Holmes	Labour
Hendon North	Ian Orr-Ewing	Conservative
Hendon South	Hugh Lucas-Tooth	Conservative
Henley	John Hay	Conservative
Hereford	James Thomas	Conservative
Hertford	Lord Balniel	Conservative
Hertfordshire East	Derek Walker-Smith	Conservative
Hertfordshire South West	Gilbert Longden	Conservative
Heston and Isleworth	Reader Harris	Conservative
Hexham	Rupert Speir	Conservative
Heywood and Royton	Tony Leavey	Conservative
High Peak	High Molson	Conservative
Hitchin	Martin Maddan	Conservative
Holborn and St Pancras South	Lena Jeger	Labour
Holland with Boston	Herbert Butcher	National Liberal
Honiton	Robert Mathew	Conservative
Horncastle	John Maitland	Conservative
Hornchurch	Godfrey Lagden	Conservative
Hornsey	David Gammans	Conservative
Horsham	Frederick Gough	Conservative
Houghton-le-Spring	Billy Blyton	Labour
Hove	Anthony Marlowe	Conservative
Howden	Paul Bryan	Conservative
Huddersfield East	Joseph Mallalieu	Labour
Huddersfield West	Donald Wade	Liberal
Huntingdonshire	David Renton	National Liberal
Huyton	Harold Wilson	Labour
Ilford North	Tom Iremonger	Conservative
Ilford South	Albert Cooper	Conservative
Ilkeston	George Oliver	Labour
Ince	Tom Brown	Labour
Inverness	Neil McLean	Conservative (Unionist Party)
Ipswich	Richard Stokes	Labour
Isle of Ely	Harry Legge-Bourke	Conservative
Isle of Thanet	William Rees-Davies	Conservative
Isle of Wight	Peter Macdonald	Conservative
Islington East	Eric Fletcher	Labour
Islington North	Wilfred Fienburgh	Labour
Islington South West	Albert Evans	Labour
Jarrow	Ernest Fernyhough	Labour
Keighley	Charles Hobson	Labour
Kensington North	George Rogers	Labour
Kensington South	Patrick Spens	Conservative
Kettering	Gilbert Mitchison	Labour
Kidderminster	Gerald Nabarro	Conservative
Kilmarnock	William Ross	Labour (Scotland)
King's Lynn	Ronald Scott-Miller	Conservative
Kingston upon Hull East	Harry Pursey	Labour
Kingston upon Hull North	Austen Hudson	Conservative
Kingston upon Hull West	Mark Hewitson	Labour
Kingston-upon-Thames	John Boyd-Carpenter	Conservative
Kinross and West Perthshire	Gilmour Leburn	Conservative (Unionist Party)
Kirkcaldy Burghs	Thomas Hubbard	Labour (Scotland)
Knutsford	Walter Bromley-Davenport	Conservative
Lanark	Hon. Patrick Maitland	Conservative (Unionist Party)
Lanarkshire North	Margaret Herbison	Labour (Scotland)
Lancaster	Fitzroy Maclean	Conservative
Leeds East	Denis Healey	Labour
Leeds North East	Osbert Peake	Conservative
Leeds North West	Donald Kaberry	Conservative
Leeds South	Hugh Gaitskell	Labour
Leeds South East	Alice Bacon	Labour
Leeds West	Charles Pannell	Labour
Leek	Harold Davies	Labour
Leicester North East	Lynn Ungoed-Thomas	Labour
Leicester North West	Barnett Janner	Labour
Leicester South East	Charles Waterhouse	Conservative
Leicester South West	Herbert Bowden	Labour
Leigh	Harold Boardman	Labour
Leominster	Archer Baldwin	Conservative
Lewes	Tufton Beamish	Conservative
Lewisham North	Austin Hudson	Conservative
Lewisham South	Herbert Morrison	Labour
Lewisham West	Henry Price	Conservative
Leyton	Reginald Sorensen	Labour
Lichfield and Tamworth	Julian Snow	Labour
Lincoln	Geoffrey de Freitas	Labour
Liverpool Edge Hill	Arthur Irvine	Labour
Liverpool Exchange	Bessie Braddock	Labour
Liverpool Garston	Victor Raikes	Conservative
Liverpool Kirkdale	Norman Pannell	Conservative
Liverpool Scotland	David Logan	Labour
Liverpool Toxteth	Reginald Bevins	Conservative
Liverpool Walton	Kenneth Thompson	Conservative
Liverpool Wavertree	John Tilney	Conservative
Liverpool West Derby	John Woollam	Conservative
Llanelli	Jim Griffiths	Labour (Wales)
Londonderry	Robin Chichester-Clark	Conservative (Ulster Unionist Party)
Loughborough	John Cronin	Labour
Louth	Cyril Osborne	Conservative
Lowestoft	Edward Evans	Labour
Ludlow	Christopher Holland-Martin	Conservative
Luton	Charles Hill	National Liberal
Macclesfield	Arthur Vere Harvey	Conservative
Maidstone	Alfred Bossom	Conservative
Maldon	Alastair Harrison	Conservative
Manchester Ardwick	Leslie Lever	Labour
Manchester Blackley	Eric Johnson	Conservative
Manchester Cheetham	Harold Lever	Labour
Manchester Exchange	Will Griffiths	Labour
Manchester Gorton	Konni Zilliacus	Labour
Manchester Moss Side	Florence Horsbrugh	Conservative
Manchester Openshaw	William Williams	Labour
Manchester Withington	Robert Cary	Conservative
Manchester Wythenshawe	Eveline Hill	Conservative
Mansfield	Bernard Taylor	Labour
Melton	Anthony Nutting	Conservative
Meriden	Reginald Moss	Labour
Merioneth	Thomas Jones	Labour (Wales)
Merthyr Tydfil	S.O. Davies	Labour (Wales)
Merton and Morden	Humphrey Atkins	Conservative
Middlesbrough East	Hilary Marquand	Labour
Middlesbrough West	Jocelyn Simon	Conservative
Middleton and Prestwich	John Barlow	Conservative
Midlothian	David Pryde	Labour (Scotland)
Mitcham	Robert Carr	Conservative
Monmouth	Peter Thorneycroft	Conservative (Wales)
Montgomery	Clement Davies	Liberal
Moray and Nairn	Hon. James Stuart	Conservative (Unionist Party)
Morecambe and Lonsdale	Ian Fraser	Conservative
Morpeth	Will Owen	Labour
Motherwell	George Lawson	Labour (Scotland)
Nantwich	Robert Grant-Ferris	Conservative
Neath	D. J. Williams	Labour (Wales)
Nelson and Colne	Sydney Silverman	Labour
New Forest	Oliver Crosthwaite-Eyre	Conservative
Newark	George Deer	Labour
Newbury	Anthony Hurd	Conservative
Newcastle-under-Lyme	Stephen Swingler	Labour
Newcastle upon Tyne Central	Ted Short	Labour
Newcastle upon Tyne East	Arthur Blenkinsop	Labour
Newcastle upon Tyne North	Hon. Gwilym Lloyd George	National Liberal
Newcastle upon Tyne West	Ernest Popplewell	Labour
Newport	Peter Freeman	Labour (Wales)
Newton	Frederick Lee	Labour
Norfolk Central	Frank Medlicott	National Liberal
Norfolk North	Edwin Gooch	Labour
Norfolk South	John Hill	Conservative
Norfolk, South West	Sidney Dye	Labour
Normanton	Albert Roberts	Labour
Northampton	Reginald Paget	Labour
Northamptonshire South	Reginald Manningham-Buller	Conservative
Northwich	John Foster	Conservative
Norwich North	John Paton	Labour
Norwich South	Geoffrey Rippon	Conservative
Norwood	John Smyth	Conservative
Nottingham Central	John Cordeaux	Conservative
Nottingham North	James Harrison	Labour
Nottingham South	Denis Keegan	Conservative
Nottingham West	Tom O'Brien	Labour
Nuneaton	Frank Bowles	Labour
Ogmore	Walter Padley	Labour (Wales)
Oldbury and Halesowen	Arthur Moyle	Labour
Oldham East	Ian Horobin	Conservative
Oldham West	Leslie Hale	Labour
Orkney and Shetland	Jo Grimond	Liberal
Ormskirk	Douglas Glover	Conservative
Orpington	Donald Sumner	Conservative
Oswestry	Hon. David Ormsby-Gore	Conservative
Oxford	Lawrence Turner	Conservative
Paddington North	Ben Parkin	Labour
Paddington South	Robert Allan	Conservative
Paisley	Douglas Johnston	Labour (Scotland)
Peckham	Freda Corbet	Labour
Pembrokeshire	Desmond Donnelly	Labour (Wales)
Penistone	Henry McGhee	Labour
Penrith and the Border	William Whitelaw	Conservative
Perth and East Perthshire	Alan Gomme-Duncan	Conservative (Unionist Party)
Peterborough	Harmar Nicholls	Conservative
Petersfield	Hon. Peter Legh	Conservative
Plymouth Devonport	Joan Vickers	National Liberal
Plymouth Sutton	Hon. Jakie Astor	Conservative
Pontefract	George Sylvester	Labour
Pontypool	Granville West	Labour (Wales)
Pontypridd	Arthur Pearson	Labour (Wales)
Poole	Richard Pilkington	Conservative
Poplar	Charles Key	Labour
Portsmouth Langstone	Geoffrey Stevens	Conservative
Portsmouth South	Jocelyn Lucas	Conservative
Portsmouth West	Terence Clarke	Conservative
Preston North	Julian Amery	Conservative
Preston South	Alan Green	Conservative
Pudsey	Cyril Banks	Conservative
Putney	Hugh Linstead	Conservative
Reading	Ian Mikardo	Labour
Reigate	John Vaughan-Morgan	Conservative
Renfrewshire East	Guy Lloyd	Conservative (Unionist Party)
Renfrewshire West	Hon. John Maclay	National Liberal
Rhondda East	William Mainwaring	Labour (Wales)
Rhondda West	Iorwerth Thomas	Labour (Wales)
Richmond (Surrey)	George Harvie-Watt	Conservative
Richmond (Yorks)	Thomas Dugdale	Conservative
Ripon	Malcolm Stoddart-Scott	Conservative
Rochdale	Wentworth Schofield	Conservative
Rochester and Chatham	Arthur Bottomley	Labour
Romford	Ron Ledger	Labour
Ross and Cromarty	John MacLeod	National Liberal
Rossendale	Tony Greenwood	Labour
Rother Valley	David Griffiths	Labour
Rotherham	Jack Jones	Labour
Rowley Regis and Tipton	Arthur Henderson	Labour
Roxburgh, Selkirk and Peebles	Charles Donaldson	Conservative (Unionist Party)
Rugby	James Johnson	Labour
Ruislip-Northwood	Petre Crowder	Conservative
Runcorn	Dennis Vosper	Conservative
Rushcliffe	Martin Redmayne	Conservative
Rutherglen	Richard Brooman-White	Conservative (Unionist Party)
Rutland and Stamford	Roger Conant	Conservative
Rye	Godman Irvine	Conservative
Saffron Walden	Rab Butler	Conservative
St Albans	Hon. John Grimston	Conservative
St Helens	Hartley Shawcross	Labour
St Ives	Hon. Greville Howard	National Liberal
St Marylebone	Wavell Wakefield	Conservative
St Pancras North	Kenneth Robinson	Labour
Salford East	Frank Allaun	Labour
Salford West	Charles Royle	Labour
Salisbury	John Morrison	Conservative
Scarborough and Whitby	Alexander Spearman	Conservative
Sedgefield	Joseph Slater	Labour
Sevenoaks	John Rodgers	Conservative
Sheffield Attercliffe	John Hynd	Labour
Sheffield Brightside	Richard Winterbottom	Labour
Sheffield Hallam	Roland Jennings	Conservative
Sheffield Heeley	Peter Roberts	Conservative
Sheffield Hillsborough	George Darling	Labour
Sheffield, Park	Fred Mulley	Labour
Shipley	Geoffrey Hirst	Conservative
Shoreditch and Finsbury	Victor Collins	Labour
Shrewsbury	John Langford-Holt	Conservative
Skipton	Burnaby Drayson	Conservative
Smethwick	Patrick Gordon Walker	Labour
Solihull	Martin Lindsay	Conservative
Somerset North	Edwin Leather	Conservative
South Shields	James Chuter Ede	Labour
Southall	George Pargiter	Labour
Southampton Itchen	Horace King	Labour
Southampton Test	John Howard	Conservative
Southend East	Stephen McAdden	Conservative
Southend West	Henry Channon	Conservative
Southgate	Beverley Baxter	Conservative
Southport	Roger Fleetwood-Hesketh	Conservative
Southwark	George Isaacs	Labour
Sowerby	Douglas Houghton	Labour
Spelthorne	Beresford Craddock	Conservative
Stafford and Stone	Hugh Fraser	Conservative
Stalybridge and Hyde	Fred Blackburn	Labour
Stepney	Walter Edwards	Labour
Stirling and Falkirk	Malcolm MacPherson	Labour (Scotland)
Stirlingshire East and Clackmannan	Arthur Woodburn	Labour (Scotland)
Stirlingshire West	Alfred Balfour	Labour (Scotland)
Stockport North	Norman Hulbert	Conservative
Stockport South	Harold Steward	Conservative
Stockton-on-Tees	George Chetwynd	Labour
Stoke-on-Trent Central	Barnett Stross	Labour
Stoke-on-Trent North	Harriet Slater	Labour
Stoke-on-Trent South	Ellis Smith	Labour
Stratford-on-Avon	John Profumo	Conservative
Streatham	Duncan Sandys	Conservative
Stretford	Samuel Storey	Conservative
Stroud	Anthony Kershaw	Conservative
Sudbury and Woodbridge	John Hare	Conservative
Sunderland North	Fred Willey	Labour
Sunderland South	Paul Williams	Conservative
Surbiton	Nigel Fisher	Conservative
Surrey East	Charles Doughty	Conservative
Sutton and Cheam	Richard Sharples	Conservative
Sutton Coldfield	Geoffrey Lloyd	Conservative
Swansea East	David Mort	Labour (Wales)
Swansea West	Percy Morris	Labour (Wales)
Swindon	Francis Noel-Baker	Labour
Taunton	Henry Hopkinson	Conservative
Tavistock	Henry Studholme	Conservative
Thirsk and Malton	Robin Turton	Conservative
Thurrock	Hugh Delargy	Labour
Tiverton	Derick Heathcoat-Amory	Conservative
Tonbridge	Gerald Williams	Conservative
Torquay	Charles Williams	Conservative
Torrington	Hon. George Lambert	National Liberal
Totnes	Ray Mawby	Conservative
Tottenham	Frederick Messer	Labour
Truro	Geoffrey Wilson	Conservative
Twickenham	Roger Gresham Cooke	Conservative
Tynemouth	Irene Ward	Conservative
Ulster, Mid	Tom Mitchell	Sinn Féin
Uxbridge	Frank Beswick	Labour
Vauxhall	George Strauss	Labour
Wakefield	Arthur Creech Jones	Labour
Wallasey	Ernest Marples	Conservative
Wallsend	John McKay	Labour
Walsall North	William Wells	Labour
Walsall South	Henry d'Avigdor-Goldsmid	Conservative
Walthamstow East	John Harvey	Conservative
Walthamstow West	Clement Attlee	Labour
Wandsworth Central	Michael Hughes-Young	Conservative
Warrington	Edith Summerskill	Labour
Warwick and Leamington	Anthony Eden	Conservative
Watford	Frederick Farey-Jones	Conservative
Wednesbury	Stanley Evans	Labour
Wellingborough	George Lindgren	Labour
Wells	Lynch Maydon	Conservative
Wembley North	Eric Bullus	Conservative
Wembley South	Ronald Russell	Conservative
West Bromwich	John Dugdale	Labour
West Ham North	Arthur Lewis	Labour
West Ham South	Elwyn Jones	Labour
West Lothian	John Taylor	Labour (Scotland)
Westbury	Robert Grimston	Conservative
Western Isles	Malcolm Macmillan	Labour (Scotland)
Westhoughton	Tom Price	Labour
Westmorland	William Fletcher-Vane	Conservative
Weston-super-Mare	Ian Orr-Ewing	Conservative
Whitehaven	Frank Anderson	Labour
Widnes	James MacColl	Labour
Wigan	Ronald Williams	Labour
Willesden East	Maurice Orbach	Labour
Willesden West	Samuel Viant	Labour
Wimbledon	Cyril Black	Conservative
Winchester	Peter Smithers	Conservative
Windsor	Charles Mott-Radclyffe	Conservative
Wirral	Selwyn Lloyd	Conservative
Woking	Harold Watkinson	Conservative
Wokingham	Peter Remnant	Conservative
Wolverhampton North East	John Baird	Labour
Wolverhampton South West	Enoch Powell	Conservative
Wood Green	Joyce Butler	Labour
Woodford	Winston Churchill	Conservative
Woolwich East	Christopher Mayhew	Labour
Woolwich West	William Steward	Conservative
Worcester	Hon. George Ward	Conservative
Worcestershire, South	Peter Agnew	Conservative
Workington	Fred Peart	Labour
Worthing	Otho Prior-Palmer	Conservative
The Wrekin	William Yates	Conservative
Wrexham	James Idwal Jones	Labour (Wales)
Wycombe	John Hall	Conservative
Yarmouth	Anthony Fell	Conservative
Yeovil	John Peyton	Conservative
York	Harry Hylton-Foster	Conservative

== By-elections ==
See the list of United Kingdom by-elections.

== See also ==
- List of parliaments of the United Kingdom
- UK general election, 1955
- Category:UK MPs 1955–1959
