= McMillan Hall, Newton Stewart =

Municipal building in Newton Stewart, Scotland

McMillan Hall
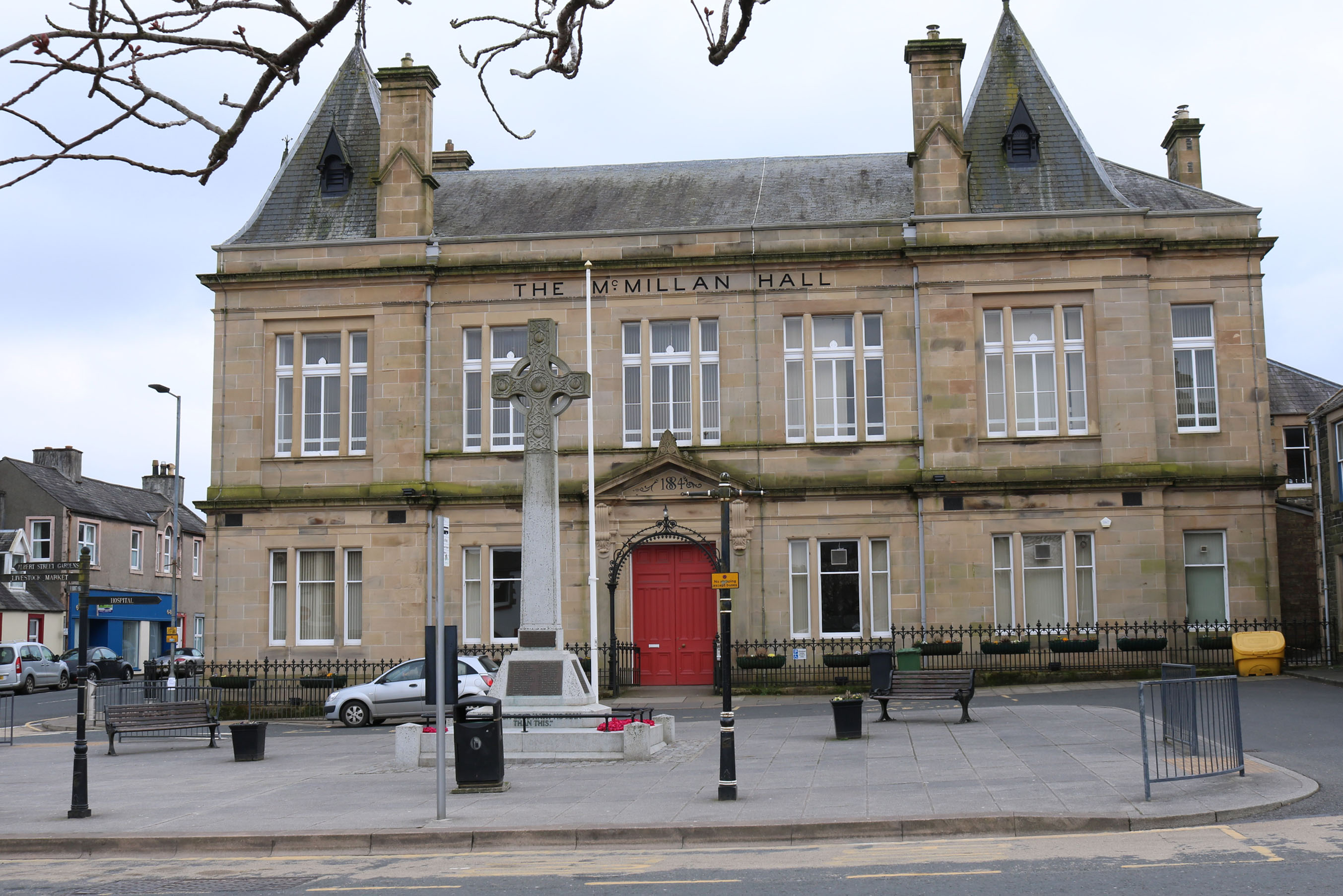
- McMillan Hall

- Shown in Dumfries and Galloway
- 54.9557°N 4.4839°W
- Location: Dashwood Square, Newton Stewart

History
- Built: 1885

Site notes
- Architect: Richard Park
- Architectural style: French Renaissance style

Listed Building – Category B
- Official name: Dashwood Square, The McMillan Hall, Railings and Gates
- Designated: 17 December 1979
- Reference no.: LB38669

The McMillan Hall is a municipal building in Dashwood Square in Newton Stewart, Dumfries and Galloway, Scotland. The structure, which is used as a community events venue, is a Category B listed building.

== History ==
The first municipal building in the town was the old town hall in Victoria Street, which was completed in around 1800. In the early 1880s, the burgh leaders found that the old town hall was inadequate for their needs and, after the local grocers, Peter and William McMillan, left £10,000 in their wills towards the cost of a new town hall, the burgh leaders decided to commission a new structure.

The foundation stone for the new building was laid by Alan Stewart, 10th Earl of Galloway in August 1884. It was designed by a local architect, Richard Park, in the French Renaissance style, built by local contractors, T. & J. Agnew, in ashlar stone and was completed in 1885. It appears that John Dick Peddie was involved in the design as well. The design involved a symmetrical main frontage of five bays facing onto Dashwood Square with the end bays slightly projected forward as pavilions with pyramid-shaped roofs; the central bay featured a doorway flanked by pilasters supporting a pediment with a date stone in the tympanum and an acroterion above. The other bays on the ground floor and all the bays on the first floor were fenestrated with tri-partite mullioned windows. On the extreme right of the frontage, there was an additional narrow bay, which was recessed and fenestrated by casement windows on both floors. Internally, the principal room was the main assembly hall on the first floor.

A war memorial, in the form of a Celtic cross mounted on a pedestal, which was intended to commemorate the lives of local service personnel who had died in the First World War, was unveiled outside the hall in the presence of the Lord Lieutenant of Wigtown, Sir Herbert Maxwell, 7th Baronet, in June 1921.

In 1933, the first of the annual Galloway Pageants took place: the celebrations involved the crowning of the "Queen of Galloway" outside the hall. In 1963, the BBC Radio programme, Have a Go, hosted by Wilfred Pickles, was broadcast from the hall. The building continued to serve as the offices and meeting place of the burgh council for much of the 20th century, but ceased to be the local seat of government when the enlarged Wigtown District Council was formed in 1975. However, the building subsequently continued to serve in its traditional role as a community events venue hosting concerts and theatre performances.

== See also ==
- List of listed buildings in Newton Stewart, Dumfries and Galloway
