= List of listed buildings in Newton Stewart, Dumfries and Galloway =

This is a list of listed buildings in the town of Newton Stewart, in Dumfries and Galloway, Scotland.

== List ==
Name	Location	Date Listed	Grid Ref. (Note: Sometimes known as OSGB36, the grid reference (where provided) is based on the British national grid reference system used by the Ordnance Survey. • "Guide to National Grid". Ordnance Survey. • "Get-a-map". Ordnance Survey.)	Geo-coordinates	Notes	LB Number (Note: Historic Environment Scotland assign a unique alphanumeric identifier to each designated site in Scotland, for listed buildings this always begins with "LB", for example "LB12345".)	Image
19-21 Albert Street				54°57′24″N 4°28′58″W	Category C(S)	38654	Upload Photo
Corvisel Road, Lynwood And Railings				54°57′17″N 4°29′11″W	Category C(S)	38666	Upload Photo
Cree Bridge				54°57′36″N 4°28′57″W	Category A	38667	Upload another image
King Street Corsbie West				54°57′55″N 4°29′19″W	Category B	38671	Upload Photo
Penkiln Suspension Footbridge				54°58′01″N 4°29′08″W	Category B	38675	Upload Photo
101 And 102 Queen Street, The Crown Hotel				54°57′12″N 4°28′55″W	Category C(S)	38682	Upload Photo
36-38 (Even Nos) Victoria Street				54°57′48″N 4°29′08″W	Category C(S)	38695	Upload Photo
11 Dashwood Square, Star Inn				54°57′22″N 4°29′00″W	Category C(S)	38653	Upload Photo
Church Street, Penninghame Graveyard With Mausoleum				54°57′25″N 4°29′07″W	Category B	38662	Upload Photo
2, 4, 6 Princes Street And 1 Dashwood Square				54°57′21″N 4°29′04″W	Category B	38676	Upload Photo
Princes Street, Glenkiel House Former Penninghame Manse With Coach House, Gates, Gatepiers And Railings				54°57′19″N 4°29′13″W	Category B	38677	Upload Photo
Princes Street, Former Uf Manse				54°57′19″N 4°29′08″W	Category C(S)	38679	Upload Photo
1 Victoria Street				54°57′27″N 4°28′57″W	Category B	38684	Upload Photo
77-79 (Odd Nos) Victoria Street, Old Town Hall				54°57′34″N 4°28′59″W	Category B	38686	Upload another image
4-10 (Even Nos) Victoria Street				54°57′28″N 4°28′58″W	Category C(S)	38689	Upload Photo
76-78 (Even Nos) Victoria Street And Boundary Walls				54°57′35″N 4°29′01″W	Category B	38699	Upload Photo
Albert Street, Bank Of Scotland				54°57′25″N 4°28′57″W	Category B	38655	Upload Photo
37 And 39 Albert Street, Albert House				54°57′26″N 4°28′57″W	Category C(S)	38656	Upload Photo
Corvisel House, Walled Garden Boundary Walls And Gatepiers				54°56′58″N 4°28′40″W	Category B	38664	Upload Photo
12 And 12A Dashwood Square				54°57′21″N 4°28′59″W	Category C(S)	38668	Upload Photo
Victoria Street, Clydesdale Bank				54°57′34″N 4°28′59″W	Category C(S)	38687	Upload Photo
2 Victoria Street, The Central Bar				54°57′27″N 4°28′58″W	Category B	38688	Upload Photo
Victoria Street, The Galloway Arms Hotel				54°57′33″N 4°29′00″W	Category B	38697	Upload Photo
Windsor Road, Roman Catholic Presbytery And Churchyward With Boundary Walls, Gatepiers, Gates And Railings				54°57′41″N 4°29′12″W	Category B	38702	Upload Photo
4 And 5 Church Street				54°57′25″N 4°29′03″W	Category C(S)	38659	Upload Photo
Princes Street, Former St Johns Church Hall				54°57′20″N 4°29′08″W	Category B	38678	Upload Photo
30 And 32 Victoria Street				54°57′30″N 4°28′59″W	Category B	38694	Upload Photo
York Road, Former Douglas-Ewart High School, Hill View Apartments				54°57′39″N 4°29′12″W	Category B	38703	Upload Photo
41-43 (Odd Nos) Albert Street				54°57′26″N 4°28′57″W	Category C(S)	38657	Upload Photo
Dashwood Square, The Mcmillan Hall, Railings And Gates				54°57′21″N 4°29′02″W	Category B	38669	Upload another image
King Street, Douglas House, Former Douglas School				54°58′00″N 4°29′15″W	Category A	38672	Upload Photo
38 King Street, The Beeches				54°57′49″N 4°29′09″W	Category C(S)	38673	Upload Photo
Queen Street, The Mart, Sale Hall, Office And Railings				54°57′11″N 4°28′58″W	Category B	38683	Upload Photo
69-73 (Odd Nos) Victoria Street				54°57′33″N 4°28′58″W	Category B	38685	Upload Photo
28 Victoria Street				54°57′30″N 4°28′59″W	Category C(S)	38693	Upload Photo
York Road, Former Uf Church, Now Newton Stewart Museum With Boundary Walls Gatepiers, And Railings				54°57′35″N 4°29′10″W	Category B	38704	Upload Photo
47-49A (Odd Nos) Albert Street				54°57′27″N 4°28′57″W	Category C(S)	38658	Upload Photo
Church Street, Penninghame Parish Church, St John's (Church_Of Scotland), Boundary Walls And Railings				54°57′28″N 4°29′07″W	Category A	38663	Upload another image
2, Corvisel Road, Prospect House				54°57′18″N 4°29′10″W	Category C(S)	38665	Upload Photo
23 King Street, Former Brewery House				54°57′47″N 4°29′06″W	Category B	38670	Upload Photo
12 Victoria Street				54°57′28″N 4°28′58″W	Category C(S)	38690	Upload Photo
40-44 (Even Nos) Victoria Street, The Royal Bank Of Scotland				54°57′32″N 4°29′00″W	Category B	38696	Upload Photo
Victoria Street, Monument To 9Th Earl Of Galloway				54°57′35″N 4°28′59″W	Category B	38700	Upload Photo
Windsor Road, Roman Catholic Church Of Our Lady And St Ninian And Churchyard				54°57′42″N 4°29′11″W	Category B	38701	Upload Photo
7 Church Street				54°57′25″N 4°29′03″W	Category C(S)	38660	Upload Photo
2 Queen Street, Dashwood House				54°57′21″N 4°29′00″W	Category B	38680	Upload Photo
Queen Street, Black Horse Hotel With Coach House				54°57′15″N 4°28′57″W	Category C(S)	38681	Upload Photo
24-26A (Even Nos) Victoria Street				54°57′30″N 4°28′59″W	Category C(S)	38692	Upload Photo
32 King Street				54°57′47″N 4°29′07″W	Category C(S)	49412	Upload Photo
13 Church Street				54°57′27″N 4°29′04″W	Category C(S)	38661	Upload Photo
King Street, Little Corsbie				54°57′54″N 4°29′13″W	Category B	38674	Upload Photo
20-22 (Even Nos) Victoria Street				54°57′29″N 4°28′59″W	Category C(S)	38691	Upload Photo
70-74 (Even Nos) Victoria Street				54°57′34″N 4°29′01″W	Category C(S)	38698	Upload Photo

== Key ==
The scheme for classifying buildings in Scotland is:

- Category A: "buildings of national or international importance, either architectural or historic; or fine, little-altered examples of some particular period, style or building type."
- Category B: "buildings of regional or more than local importance; or major examples of some particular period, style or building type, which may have been altered."
- Category C: "buildings of local importance; lesser examples of any period, style, or building type, as originally constructed or moderately altered; and simple traditional buildings which group well with other listed buildings."

In March 2016 there were 47,288 listed buildings in Scotland. Of these, 8% were Category A, and 50% were Category B, with the remaining 42% being Category C.
