= Baron Lang =

Baron Lang may refer to:

- Cosmo Gordon Lang (1864-1945), 1st Baron Lang of Lambeth, Archbishop of Canterbury
- Ian Lang (born 1940), Baron Lang of Monkton, British politician
