= Old Town Hall, Newton Stewart =

Municipal building in Newton Stewart, Scotland

Old Town Hall
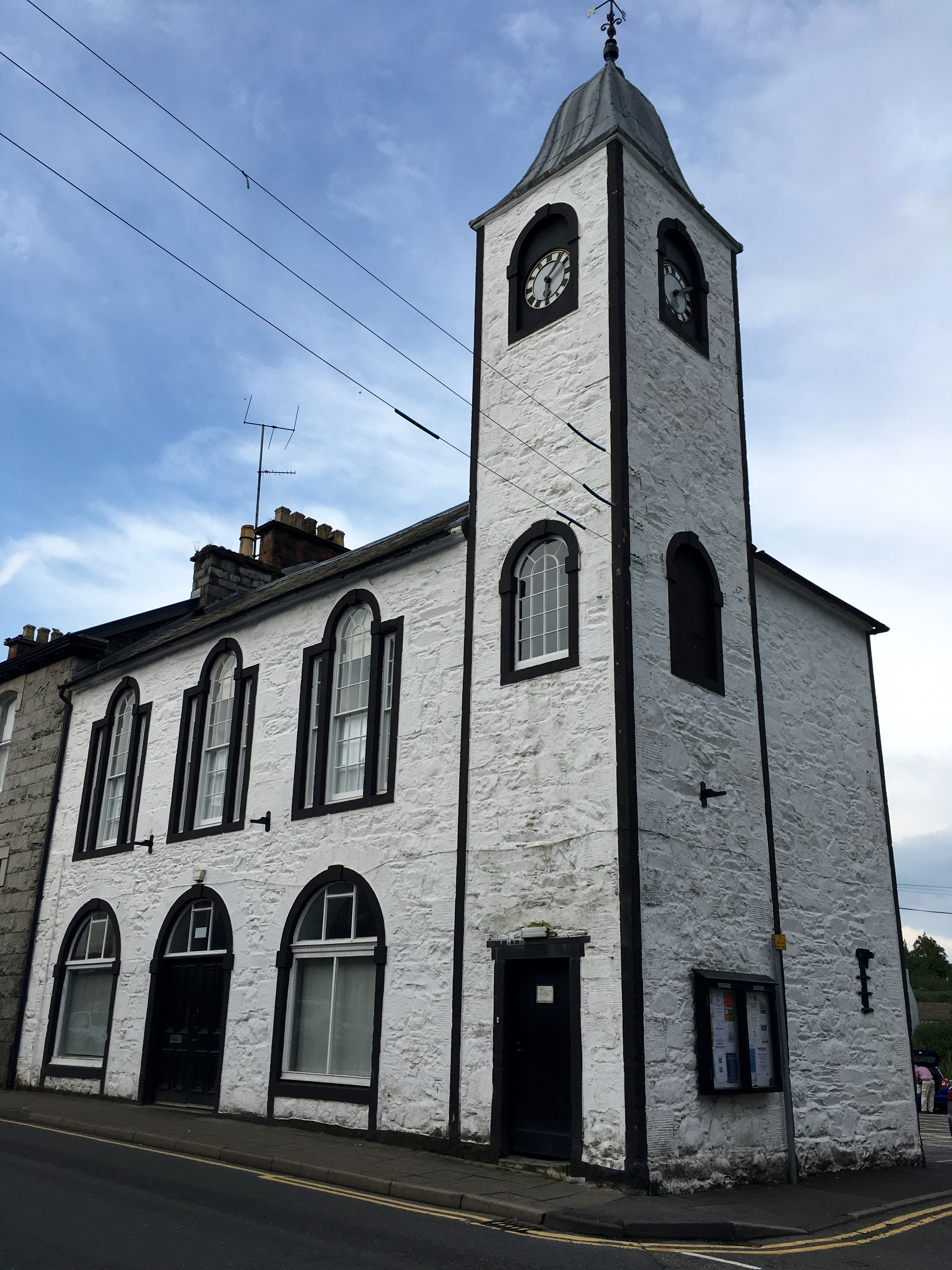
- The building in 2019

- Shown in Dumfries and Galloway
- 54.9594°N 4.4830°W
- Location: Victoria Street, Newton Stewart

History
- Built: c.1800

Site notes
- Architectural style: Italianate style

Listed Building – Category B
- Official name: 77–79 (Odd Nos) Victoria Street, Old Town Hall
- Designated: 20 July 1972
- Reference no.: LB38686

The Old Town Hall is a former municipal building on Victoria Street in Newton Stewart, Scotland. The building, which was previously the meeting place of the burgh council, is a Category B listed building.

== History ==
Following significant population growth, largely associated with the new cotton mills established by Sir William Douglas, the local laird, John Stewart, 7th Earl of Galloway, whose seat was at Galloway House, decided to commission a town hall for the area. The site he chose was on the corner of Victoria Street and Riverside Road, backing onto the River Cree.

The building was designed in the Italianate style, built in painted rubble masonry and was completed in around 1800. The design involved an asymmetrical main frontage of four bays facing onto Victoria Street. The main block of three bays, on the left, featured three round-headed openings, formed by pilasters supporting imposts and arches with raised keystones; there were three Venetian windows on the first floor. The right-hand bay featured a three-stage clock tower with a doorway in the first stage, a round headed window in the second stage and clock faces in the third stage, all surmounted by an ogee-shaped dome and a weather vane. Internally, the principal room was an assembly room on the first floor which could accommodate up to 120 people.

There was a staircase in the tower: a lock-up for incarcerating petty criminals was installed below the foot of the staircase, and a clock, designed and manufactured by William Frederick Evans of the Soho Clock Factory in Birmingham, was installed at the top of the tower. Merchants were allowed to establish shops on the ground floor and members of the local mechanics' institute were allowed to use the assembly room in the evenings. Newspapers and books were provided for users of the institute. The assembly room also served as the meeting place of the burgh council for much of the 19th century, but ceased to be the local seat of government when the council relocated to the McMillan Hall in 1885.

During the 20th century, the ground floor continued to be used by local merchants, although latterly it was made available for leisure activities and, in particular, it was used by the local snooker club. Meanwhile, the assembly room continued to be used by the mechanics' institute for a while and then became a space for public meetings. An extensive programme of repairs was instigated after the building was damaged by flooding when the River Cree broke its banks in December 2015. The building is now a community asset owned by Dumfries and Galloway Council.

== See also ==
- List of listed buildings in Newton Stewart, Dumfries and Galloway
