= Gilbert McMicking (British politician) =

British politician

Gilbert McMicking CMG

Member of Parliament for Galloway
- In office 14 December 1918 – 26 October 1922
- Preceded by: Constituency created
- Succeeded by: Cecil Dudgeon

Member of Parliament for Kirkcudbrightshire
- In office December 1910 – 25 November 1918
- Preceded by: Mark MacTaggart-Stewart
- Succeeded by: Constituency abolished

Member of Parliament for Kirkcudbrightshire
- In office 1906 – January 1910
- Preceded by: John Maxwell Heron-Maxwell
- Succeeded by: Mark MacTaggart-Stewart

Personal details
- Born: 24 March 1862 Liverpool, England
- Died: 15 November 1942 (aged 80) Glasgow, Scotland
- Party: Liberal
- Spouses: Gertrude Gore (m. 1893; died 1920) Ethel Binny Douglas (m. 1921)
- Children: 3
- Parent(s): Gilbert McMicking; Helen MacFarlane
- Profession: Politician

Military service
- Allegiance: United Kingdom
- Branch/service: City of London Imperial Volunteers
- Years of service: 1899 – 1901
- Rank: Major
- Battles/wars: Second Boer War: Siege of Kimberley

Major Gilbert McMicking CMG (24 March 1862 – 15 November 1942) was a Scottish Liberal Party politician.

He was the son of Gilbert McMicking and Helen MacFarlane.

On 1 November 1893 at Kensington, London. Gilbert married first, Gertrude Rosabel Katherine Gore (1871-1920). Gilbert and Gertrude were the parents of:

- Gilbert Thomas Gore McMicking, b.2 August 1894, Stanton Lacy, Shropshire, England – d.11 November 1918 in Netherlands
- Ralph Gore McMicking, b. May, 1897, Dadford, England – d.1964,Surrey, England
- Robert James Gore McMicking (b. 6 October 1905 – d.1983, Surrey).

On 22 July 1921 at London, England, Gilbert married second, Ethel Eliza Binny Douglas (1876-1935).

He served with the Honourable Artillery Company and reached the rank of Major. After the outbreak of the Second Boer War in October 1899, a corps of imperial volunteers from London was formed in late December 1899. The corps included infantry, mounted infantry and artillery divisions and was authorized with the name City of London Imperial Volunteers (CIV). It proceeded to South Africa in the early months of 1900, returned in October the same year, and was disbanded in December 1900. Major McMicking was appointed in charge of Field Battery (the artillery division) of the CIV on 1 January 1900, with the temporary rank of Major in the Army, and left London for South Africa in early February with a contingent of officers and men of the Honourable Artillery Company. He served in command of the artillery division of the CIV until the corps was disbanded. He was appointed a Companion of the Order of St Michael and St George (CMG) for his services in South Africa in 1901.

He was Member of Parliament (MP) for Kirkcudbrightshire from 1906 to January 1910, and from December 1910 until the constituency was abolished for the 1918 general election. He was then elected for the new Galloway constituency, and stood down at the 1922 general election.

Parliament of the United Kingdom
Preceded by John Maxwell Heron-Maxwell	Member of Parliament for Kirkcudbrightshire; 1906–Jan. 1910	Succeeded by Mark John MacTaggart-Stewart
Preceded by Mark John MacTaggart-Stewart	Member of Parliament for Kirkcudbrightshire; Dec. 1910–1918	Constituency abolished
New constituency	Member of Parliament for Galloway; 1918–1922	Succeeded by Cecil Dudgeon
