= Cecil Dudgeon =

Cecil Dudgeon

Cecil Randolph Dudgeon (7 November 1885 – 4 November 1970) was a Scottish Liberal Member of Parliament (MP) who joined Oswald Mosley's New Party.

He was elected at the 1922 general election as MP for Galloway, re-elected unopposed in 1923, but was defeated at the 1924 general election. He was beaten again at the by-election in 1925 following the death of his Unionist successor Sir Arthur Henniker-Hughan, but regained the seat at the 1929 general election.

When Parliament was dissolved for the 1931 general election, Dudgeon resigned from the Liberal Party and contested the election as a New Party candidate. He finished 4th of 4 candidates, with 986 votes (a 2.0% share). He did not stand for Parliament again.

Parliament of the United Kingdom
Preceded by Gilbert McMicking	Member of Parliament for Galloway; 1922–1924	Succeeded by Sir Arthur Henniker-Hughan, Bt.
Preceded by Sidney Streatfeild	Member of Parliament for Galloway; 1929–1931	Succeeded by John Mackie
