= Lord Lieutenant of Wigtown =

Ceremonial officer in Wigtown, Scotland

This is a list of people who have served as Lord Lieutenant of Wigtown, part of the Dumfries and Galloway council area of south-west Scotland. Prior to 1975 the lieutenancy area corresponded to the historic county of Wigtownshire. Since 1975 the lieutenancy area has been the slightly larger Wigtown Area, covering the historic county plus the two parishes of Kirkmabreck and Minnigaff from Kirkcudbrightshire.

== Title ==
The current title of the Lord Lieutenant is His Majesty's Lord-Lieutenant for Wigtown, or the Lord Lieutenant for the Area of Wigtown. The area of Wigtown, the name of the relevant lieutenancy area of the Lord Lieutenant, corresponds to the local government district of Wigtown established in 1975 and abolished in 1996. The district was named after the town of Wigtown, and covered the historic county of Wigtownshire plus the two parishes of Kirkmabreck and Minnigaff from the historic county of Kirkcudbrightshire.

Between 1794 and 1975, the official title of the office was His or Her Majesty's Lieutenant in the County of Wigtown. From 1975, the title became Lord-Lieutenant in Dumfries and Galloway Region (District of Wigtown), altering in 1996 to its present form described above.

== List of office-holders ==
- John Stewart, 7th Earl of Galloway 17 March 1794 – 13 November 1806
- George Stewart, 8th Earl of Galloway 24 March 1807 – 1828
- Randolph Stewart, 9th Earl of Galloway 9 July 1828 – 1851
- John Dalrymple, 10th Earl of Stair 16 May 1851 – 3 December 1903
- Sir Herbert Maxwell, 7th Baronet 26 December 1903 – 1935
- John Dalrymple, 12th Earl of Stair 17 April 1935 – 4 November 1961
- John Dalrymple, 13th Earl of Stair 8 January 1962 – 1981
- Maj. John Brewis 18 September 1981 – 25 May 1989
- Maj. Edward Orr-Ewing 1 November 1989 – 2006
- Marion Brewis 14 August 2006 – 31 December 2014
- John Ross 25 Sep 2015 – 19 Feb 2020
- Aileen Brewis 20 Feb 2020 to present
