= 1925 Galloway by-election =

UK parliamentary by-election

The 1925 Galloway by-election was a by-election held for the British House of Commons constituency of Galloway in Scotland on 17 November 1925. The by-election was won by the Unionist Party candidate Sidney Streatfeild.

== Vacancy ==
The Unionist MP Vice-Admiral Sir Arthur Henniker-Hughan had died on 4 October 1925. He had held the seat since gaining it from the Liberals at the 1924 general election;

General election 1924 Electorate 30,107
Party	Candidate	Votes	%	±%
Unionist	Arthur Henniker-Hughan	12,268	53.1	New
Liberal	Cecil Dudgeon	10,852	46.9	N/A
Majority		1,416	6.2	N/A
Turnout		23,120	76.8	N/A
Unionist gain from Liberal		Swing	N/A	

== History ==
The constituency was created for the 1918 general election, at which a Coalition Government supporting, couponed, sitting Liberal MP was returned unopposed. At the following General Election in 1922, after the Coalition Government had ended, a Liberal beat a Unionist and in 1923, the sitting Liberal was returned unopposed.

== Candidates ==
The Unionist candidate was 31-year-old company director, Captain Sidney Streatfeild, who had previously contested the City of Durham constituency at the 1924 general election.

The Liberal Party candidate was 40-year-old local farmer, Major Cecil Dudgeon, (Portrait) who had held the seat from 1922 until his defeat in 1924 by Henniker-Hughan.

The Labour Party, which had never before contested the constituency, decided to intervene and fielded as candidate, John Mitchell.

== Campaign ==
Polling Day was fixed for 17 November 1925, 43 days after the death of the previous member, allowing for a long campaign.

== Result ==
On an increased turnout, Streatfeild held the seat for the Unionists, with a reduced majority of 928 votes. The Labour candidate finished third, splitting the anti-Unionist vote enough to deny the Liberal victory;

Galloway by-election, 1925 Electorate 29,992
Party	Candidate	Votes	%	±%
Unionist	Sidney Streatfeild	10,846	43.5	−9.6
Liberal	Cecil Dudgeon	9,918	39.7	−7.2
Labour	John Mitchell	4,207	16.8	New
Majority		928	3.8	−2.4
Turnout		24,971	83.3	+6.5
Unionist hold		Swing	−1.2	

== Aftermath ==
At the following General Election in 1929, Dudgeon gained the seat for the Liberals;

General election 1929: Galloway Electorate 39,621
Party	Candidate	Votes	%	±%
Liberal	Cecil Dudgeon	13,461	42.4	+2.7
Unionist	Sidney Streatfeild	13,360	42.1	−1.4
Labour	Hector McNeill	4,903	15.5	−1.3
Majority		101	0.3	N/A
Turnout		31,724	80.1	−3.2
Liberal gain from Unionist		Swing	+2.1	

== See also ==
- Galloway (UK Parliament constituency)
- Galloway
- List of United Kingdom by-elections (1918–1931)
