= Arthur Henniker-Hughan =

Royal Navy Admiral and politician (1866–1925)

Admiral Sir Arthur Henniker-Hughan Bt CB

Member of Parliament for Galloway
- In office 29 October 1924 – 4 October 1925
- Preceded by: Cecil Randolph Dudgeon
- Succeeded by: Sidney Streatfeild

Personal details
- Born: 24 January 1866
- Died: 4 October 1925 (aged 59) London, England
- Cause of death: Pneumonia
- Party: Scottish Unionist
- Awards: Companion of the Bath

Military service
- Allegiance: Great Britain
- Branch/service: Royal Navy
- Years of service: 1879–1919
- Rank: Admiral

Admiral Sir Arthur John Henniker-Hughan, 6th Baronet, CB (24 January 1866 – 4 October 1925) was a Royal Navy officer who sat as Unionist Member of Parliament (MP) for Galloway from 1924 until his death.

== Personal life ==
Henniker-Hughan was the second son of Sir Brydges Henniker Bt. (of Newton Hall in Essex) and Louisa Hughan of Airds House, Parton, Galloway. As he was the second son, and not expected to inherit, he was bequeathed the Hughan family estates in Galloway by his maternal grandfather (Thomas Hughan). He inherited following the death of his aunt in 1896, at which point he took the second surname Hughan. Following the sudden and unexpected death of his brother, Colonel Sir Frederick Henniker, in late 1908 he succeeded to the Henniker baronetcy as well (as the sixth Baronet), but continued to live at Airds in Galloway.

He married Inger Hutchison of Balmaghie (Galloway) in January 1904, and the couple had three daughters, Beryl, Rhona and Alison (Sally).

He died of pneumonia on 4 October 1925 at a nursing home in London, aged 59. As he left no male heir the Henniker baronetcy passed on his death to distant cousin, Sir Robert Henniker.

== Naval career ==
Henniker-Hughan entered the Royal Navy as a midshipman in July 1879, at the age of 13. He was first posted to a ship two years later in 1881, as a midshipman aboard HMS Nelson. His subsequent career saw him posted in ships across the world, serving in Australia, North America, China, The Mediterranean, Atlantic and in the Scottish Coastguard. In February 1900, he was a commander posted to the battleship Ocean as it had its first commission in the Mediterranean Fleet. He was promoted captain in 1904, and was in command of the battleship HMS Ajax at the outset of World War I, serving in the Grand Fleet under Admiral Jellicoe. He became the commander of the Naval Dockyard at Devonport in December 1916, following his promotion to flag rank earlier that year. He retired after the war (in 1919) and was made a Companion of the Bath (CB) in recognition of his wartime services.

== Member of Parliament ==
Some five years after his retirement from the navy, Henniker-Hughan stood for Parliament as a Unionist candidate at the 1924 General Election, winning the Galloway seat from the incumbent member, Cecil Dudgeon. According to his Times obituary, "His early and unexpected death less than a year later cut short his parliamentary service after a well-received beginning".

== See also ==
- List of United Kingdom MPs with the shortest service

Parliament of the United Kingdom
Preceded by Cecil Randolph Dudgeon	Member of Parliament for Galloway; 1924–1925	Succeeded by Sidney Streatfeild
Baronetage of the United Kingdom
Preceded by Frederick Henniker	Baronet (of Newton Hall); 1908–1925	Succeeded by Robert Henniker
