= George Thompson (Scottish National Party politician) =

Scottish politician (1928–2016)

Member of Parliament for Galloway
- In office 10 October 1974 – 7 April 1979
- Preceded by: John Brewis
- Succeeded by: Ian Lang

Personal details
- Born: George Henry Thompson; 11 September 1928
- Died: 23 December 2016 (aged 88)
- Party: Scottish National Party

Ecclesiastical career
- Religion: Christianity
- Church: Roman Catholic Church
- Ordained: 1 September 1989
- Congregations served: St Teresa's, Dumfries; St Margaret of Scotland, Irvine; St Peter's, Dalbeattie

George Henry Thompson (11 September 1928 – 23 December 2016) was a Scottish National Party politician and Roman Catholic priest. He served as the Member of Parliament for Galloway from October 1974–79.

== Early life ==
Thompson was born on 11 September 1928 in The Glenkens, Galloway, Scotland. He attended Dalry School and Kirkcudbright Academy. In the 1950s he went to Rome and studied at the Pontifical Scots College. After the death of his father, he returned to Scotland without completing his studies, then spent seven years working for the Forestry Commission. He subsequently graduated from the University of Edinburgh and took up a position at his old school, Kirkcudbright Academy, where he taught French and German.

== Political career ==
Thompson stood as the SNP candidate for the Galloway constituency in the February 1974 United Kingdom general election but was unsuccessful. Another election was called later that year in October 1974, this time he gained the Galloway seat from the Conservatives with a majority of 30 votes (0.1%). Following the election he was announced as the SNP's spokesperson on health. He stood again in 1979 but lost the seat to the Conservative Ian Lang.

== Priest ==
Following a return to teaching at Annan Academy, he resumed his clerical studies at St John's Seminary Wonersh, Surrey. In September 1989 he was ordained as a Roman Catholic priest in St Teresa's, Dumfries, in 1989. He served as assistant in St Teresa's, Dumfries, as Parish Priest in St Margaret of Scotland in Irvine, and as parish priest in St Peter's, Dalbeattie in 1993.

He died aged 88 years, on 23 December 2016, at Senwick Nursing Home in Borgue, Dumfries and Galloway.

Parliament of the United Kingdom
Preceded by John Brewis	Member of Parliament for Galloway; October 1974 – 1979	Succeeded by Ian Lang
