= Minnigaff =

Coordinates: 54.966958°N 4.483167°W

Minnigaff: Scottish Gaelic: Muine Gobha
- Location within Dumfries and Galloway
- Council area: Dumfries and Galloway
- Lieutenancy area: Wigtown
- Country: Scotland
- Sovereign state: United Kingdom
- Postcode district: DG8
- Dialling code: 01671
- Police: Scotland
- Fire: Scottish
- Ambulance: Scottish
- UK Parliament: Dumfries and Galloway
- Scottish Parliament: Galloway and Upper Nithsdale

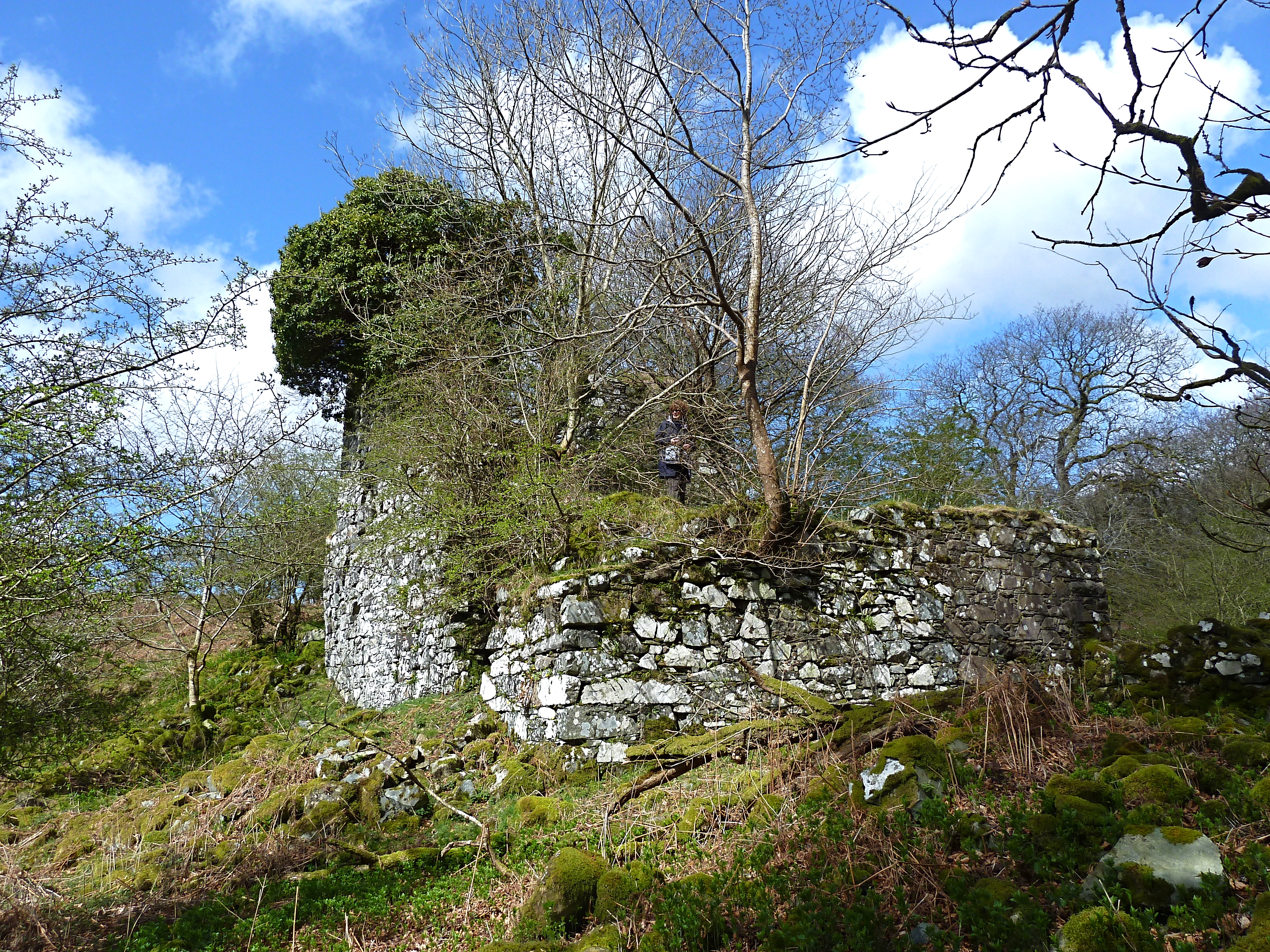
Garlies Castle, Minnigaff

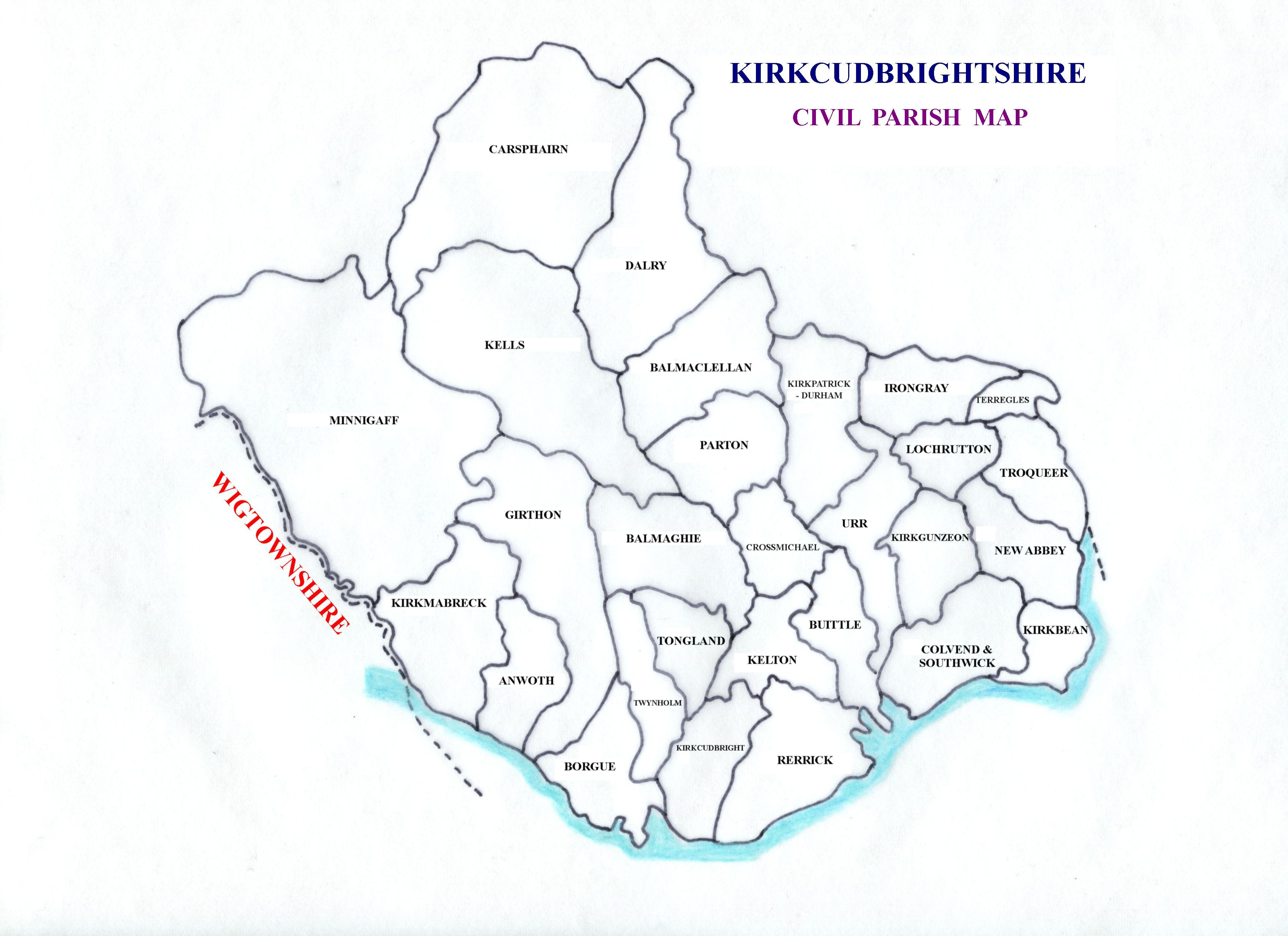
Kirkcudbrightshire, civil parish map

Minnigaff is a village and civil parish in the historic county of Kirkcudbrightshire in Dumfries and Galloway, Scotland. Lead was discovered there in 1763 and mined about two miles from the village until 1839.

== Etymology ==
The name Minnigaff or Minigaff is of Brittonic origin. The generic element is mönïδ, meaning "a prominent hill", while the specific is goβ, meaning "a blacksmith" (cf. Welsh mynydd-gof). The Minnigaff Hills, part of the Galloway Forest Park, are located north of the village.

== History ==
Minnigaff was one of two parishes from Kirkcudbrightshire which were included in the Wigtown District which existed from 1975 to 1996, and as such forms part of the Wigtown lieutenancy area rather than the Stewartry of Kirkcudbright lieutenancy.

== Notable people ==
Minnigaff is the birthplace of John M'Millan, the Cameronian preacher. Sir James Mirrlees, winner of the 1996 Nobel Memorial Prize in Economic Sciences was also born there.

== Buildings ==
- List of listed buildings in Minnigaff, Dumfries and Galloway
