= Sidney Streatfeild =

Sidney Richard Streatfeild (27 June 1894 – 2 December 1966) was a Scottish Unionist Party politician descended from the historic Streatfeild family.

Sidney Streatfeild was the son of Hugh Streatfeild (1867–1950) and Evelyn Cherry (d 1964). He was educated at Rugby School. He served in the Great War 1914 - 1919 in the 2nd Battalion Durham Light Infantry.

He married in 1916, Muriel Mary, daughter of S. C. Bristowe and Ethel Bristowe of Craig, Balmaclellan in Kirkcudbrightshire.

At the 1924 general election he stood unsuccessfully as a Conservative Party candidate in the City of Durham constituency, but after the death in 1925 of Unionist MP Sir Arthur Henniker-Hughan, he won the Galloway seat at the resulting by-election in 1925.

However, at the 1929 general election, he lost the seat to Cecil Dudgeon, Henniker-Hughan's Liberal predecessor who had been the runner-up in the by-election.

Sidney Streatfeild did not stand for Parliament again.

Parliament of the United Kingdom
Preceded by Sir Arthur Henniker-Hughan, Bt.	Member of Parliament for Galloway; 1925–1929	Succeeded by Cecil Dudgeon
