= Galloway (UK Parliament constituency) =

Parliamentary constituency in the United Kingdom, 1918–1983

- Former county constituency for the House of Commons
- Subdivision: Dumfries and Galloway
- Major settlements: Stranraer, Castle Douglas, Dalbeattie, Kirkcudbright, Newton Stewart

1918–1983
- Seats: One
- Created from: Kirkcudbrightshire and Wigtownshire
- Replaced by: Galloway and Upper Nithsdale

Galloway was a county constituency in the Galloway area of Scotland. It elected one Member of Parliament (MP) to the House of Commons of the Parliament of the United Kingdom, by the first past the post voting system.

It was created for the 1918 general election, and abolished for the 1983 general election, when it was largely replaced by the new Galloway and Upper Nithsdale constituency.

== Members of Parliament ==
| Election | Member | Party |
|---|---|---|
| 1918 | Gilbert McMicking | Coalition Liberal |
| 1922 | Cecil Dudgeon | Liberal |
| 1924 | Sir Arthur Henniker-Hughan, Bt. | Unionist |
| 1925 by-election | Sidney Streatfeild | Unionist |
| 1929 | Cecil Dudgeon | Liberal |
| 1931 | Cecil Dudgeon | New Party |
| 1931 | John Mackie | Unionist |
| 1959 by-election | John Brewis | Unionist |
| Oct 1974 | George Thompson | SNP |
| 1979 | Ian Lang | Conservative |
| 1983 | constituency abolished | |

== Election results ==
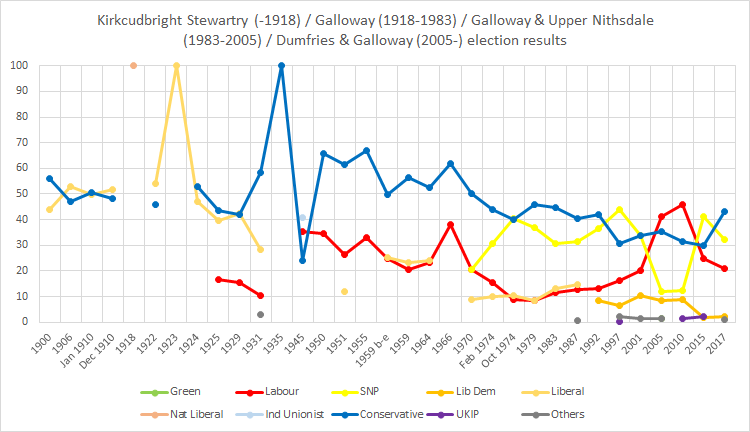
Galloway constituencies election results

=== Elections in the 1910s ===
G. McMicking

General election 1918: Galloway
| Party | | Candidate | Votes | % |
|---|---|---|---|---|
| C | Liberal | Gilbert McMicking | Unopposed | |
| Registered electors | | | | |
| | Liberal win (new seat) | | | |
C indicates candidate endorsed by the coalition government.

=== Elections in the 1920s ===
General election 1922: Galloway
| Party | Candidate | Votes | % | ±% |
|---|---|---|---|---|
| Liberal | Cecil Dudgeon | 12,406 | 54.0 | N/A |
| Unionist | William Watson | 10,557 | 46.0 | New |
| Majority | | 1,849 | 8.0 | N/A |
| Turnout | | 22,963 | 77.5 | N/A |
| Registered electors | | 29,645 | | |
| Liberal hold | | Swing | N/A | |

General election 1923: Galloway
| Party | Candidate | Votes | % | ±% |
|---|---|---|---|---|
| Liberal | Cecil Dudgeon | Unopposed | | |
| Registered electors | | | | |
| Liberal hold | | | | |

General election 1924: Galloway
| Party | Candidate | Votes | % | ±% |
|---|---|---|---|---|
| Unionist | Arthur Henniker-Hughan | 12,268 | 53.1 | New |
| Liberal | Cecil Dudgeon | 10,852 | 46.9 | N/A |
| Majority | | 1,416 | 6.2 | N/A |
| Turnout | | 23,120 | 76.8 | N/A |
| Registered electors | | 30,107 | | |
| Unionist gain from Liberal | | Swing | N/A | |

1925 Galloway by-election
| Party | Candidate | Votes | % | ±% |
|---|---|---|---|---|
| Unionist | Sidney Streatfeild | 10,846 | 43.5 | −9.6 |
| Liberal | Cecil Dudgeon | 9,918 | 39.7 | −7.2 |
| Labour | J. Mitchell | 4,207 | 16.8 | New |
| Majority | | 928 | 3.8 | −2.4 |
| Turnout | | 24,971 | 83.3 | +6.5 |
| Registered electors | | 29,992 | | |
| Unionist hold | | Swing | −1.2 | |

General election 1929: Galloway
| Party | Candidate | Votes | % | ±% |
|---|---|---|---|---|
| Liberal | Cecil Dudgeon | 13,461 | 42.4 | −4.5 |
| Unionist | Sidney Streatfeild | 13,360 | 42.1 | −11.0 |
| Labour | Hector McNeil | 4,903 | 15.5 | N/A |
| Majority | | 101 | 0.3 | N/A |
| Turnout | | 31,724 | 80.1 | +3.3 |
| Registered electors | | 39,621 | | |
| Liberal gain from Unionist | | Swing | +3.0 | |

=== Elections in the 1930s ===
General election 1931: Galloway
| Party | Candidate | Votes | % | ±% |
|---|---|---|---|---|
| Unionist | John Mackie | 18,993 | 58.3 | +16.2 |
| Liberal | Edward Campbell | 9,176 | 28.2 | –14.2 |
| Labour | Hector McNeil | 3,418 | 10.5 | –5.0 |
| New Party | Cecil Dudgeon | 986 | 3.0 | New |
| Majority | | 9,817 | 30.1 | N/A |
| Turnout | | 32,573 | 80.6 | +0.5 |
| Registered electors | | 40,312 | | |
| Unionist gain from Liberal | | Swing | +2.1 | |

General election 1935: Galloway
| Party | Candidate | Votes | % | ±% |
|---|---|---|---|---|
| Unionist | John Mackie | Unopposed | | |
| Registered electors | | | | |
| Unionist hold | | | | |

=== Elections in the 1940s ===
General Election 1939–40

Another General Election was required to take place before the end of 1940. The political parties had been making preparations for an election to take place from 1939 and by the end of this year, the following candidates had been selected;

- Unionist: John Mackie

General election 1945: Galloway
| Party | Candidate | Votes | % | ±% |
|---|---|---|---|---|
| Ind. Unionist | John Mackie | 13,647 | 40.7 | N/A |
| Labour | Robert Hales | 11,822 | 35.3 | New |
| Unionist | B Fergusson | 8,032 | 24.0 | N/A |
| Majority | | 1,825 | 5.4 | N/A |
| Turnout | | 33,501 | 69.9 | N/A |
| Registered electors | | 47,922 | | |
| Ind. Unionist gain from Unionist | | Swing | N/A | |

John Mackie was denied an official endorsement from the Scottish Unionists because of his involvement with the pro-Fascist Right Book Club. He regained the whip in 1948.

=== Elections in the 1950s ===
General election 1950: Galloway
| Party | Candidate | Votes | % | ±% |
|---|---|---|---|---|
| Unionist | John Mackie | 19,136 | 65.6 | +41.6 |
| Labour | Alan Thompson | 10,056 | 34.4 | –0.8 |
| Majority | | 9,080 | 31.1 | +19.8 |
| Turnout | | 29,192 | 63.0 | –6.9 |
| Registered electors | | 46,338 | | –1,584 |
| Unionist gain from Ind. Unionist | | Swing | +21.2 | |

General election 1951: Galloway
| Party | Candidate | Votes | % | ±% |
|---|---|---|---|---|
| Unionist | John Mackie | 16,261 | 61.6 | –3.9 |
| Labour | Alan Thompson | 6,949 | 26.3 | –8.1 |
| Liberal | Robert Johnston | 3,174 | 12.0 | New |
| Majority | | 9,312 | 35.3 | +4.2 |
| Turnout | | 26,384 | 75.6 | +12.6 |
| Registered electors | | 34,896 | | –11,442 |
| Unionist hold | | Swing | +2.1 | |

General election 1955: Galloway
| Party | Candidate | Votes | % | ±% |
|---|---|---|---|---|
| Unionist | John Mackie | 15,893 | 66.9 | +5.2 |
| Labour | William Gray | 7,879 | 33.1 | +6.8 |
| Majority | | 8,014 | 33.7 | –1.6 |
| Turnout | | 23,772 | 69.1 | –6.5 |
| Registered electors | | 34,396 | | –500 |
| Unionist hold | | Swing | –0.8 | |

1959 Galloway by-election
| Party | Candidate | Votes | % | ±% |
|---|---|---|---|---|
| Unionist | John Brewis | 13,204 | 49.9 | –16.9 |
| Liberal | Simon Mackay | 6,721 | 25.4 | New |
| Labour | W Cross | 6,520 | 24.7 | –8.5 |
| Majority | | 6,483 | 24.5 | –9.2 |
| Turnout | | 26,445 | 72.7 | +4.4 |
| Registered electors | | 35,980 | | +1,584 |
| Unionist hold | | Swing | –4.2 | |

General election 1959: Galloway
| Party | Candidate | Votes | % | ±% |
|---|---|---|---|---|
| Unionist | John Brewis | 15,454 | 56.3 | –10.6 |
| Liberal | Simon Mackay | 6,412 | 23.4 | N/A |
| Labour | James Pickett | 5,590 | 20.4 | –12.8 |
| Majority | | 9,042 | 32.9 | –0.8 |
| Turnout | | 27,456 | 75.6 | +6.5 |
| Registered electors | | 36,296 | | +1,900 |
| Unionist hold | | Swing | –17.0 | |

=== Elections in the 1960s ===
General election 1964: Galloway
| Party | Candidate | Votes | % | ±% |
|---|---|---|---|---|
| Unionist | John Brewis | 14,530 | 52.7 | –3.5 |
| Liberal | Simon Mackay | 6,619 | 24.0 | +0.7 |
| Labour | JP Gordon | 6,401 | 23.2 | +2.9 |
| Majority | | 7,911 | 28.7 | –4.2 |
| Turnout | | 27,550 | 73.8 | –1.8 |
| Registered electors | | 37,331 | | +1,035 |
| Unionist hold | | Swing | –2.1 | |

General election 1966: Galloway
| Party | Candidate | Votes | % | ±% |
|---|---|---|---|---|
| Conservative | John Brewis | 15,137 | 62.0 | +9.2 |
| Labour | D Douglas | 9,283 | 38.0 | +14.8 |
| Majority | | 5,854 | 23.98 | –4.7 |
| Turnout | | 24,420 | 66.6 | –7.2 |
| Registered electors | | 36,683 | | –648 |
| Conservative hold | | Swing | –2.8 | |

=== Elections in the 1970s ===
General election 1970: Galloway
| Party | Candidate | Votes | % | ±% |
|---|---|---|---|---|
| Conservative | John Brewis | 14,003 | 50.3 | –11.7 |
| SNP | Arthur Donaldson | 5,723 | 20.5 | New |
| Labour | D Douglas | 5,665 | 20.3 | –17.7 |
| Liberal | Christopher Scott | 2,461 | 8.8 | New |
| Majority | | 8,280 | 29.7 | +5.8 |
| Turnout | | 27,852 | 72.0 | +5.5 |
| Registered electors | | 38,669 | | +1,986 |
| Conservative hold | | Swing | –16.1 | |

General election February 1974: Galloway
| Party | Candidate | Votes | % | ±% |
|---|---|---|---|---|
| Conservative | John Brewis | 13,316 | 43.9 | –6.4 |
| SNP | George Thompson | 9,308 | 30.7 | +10.1 |
| Liberal | David Hannay | 4,643 | 15.3 | +6.5 |
| Labour | H Chalmers | 3,091 | 10.2 | –10.2 |
| Majority | | 4,008 | 13.2 | –16.5 |
| Turnout | | 30,358 | 77.8 | +5.7 |
| Registered electors | | 39,043 | | +374 |
| Conservative hold | | Swing | –8.3 | |

General election October 1974: Galloway
| Party | Candidate | Votes | % | ±% |
|---|---|---|---|---|
| SNP | George Thompson | 12,242 | 40.3 | +9.6 |
| Conservative | Kenneth Ross | 12,212 | 40.2 | –3.7 |
| Liberal | David Hannay | 3,181 | 10.5 | +0.2 |
| Labour | TG Fulton | 2,742 | 9.0 | –6.2 |
| Majority | | 30 | 0.1 | N/A |
| Turnout | | 30,377 | 77.1 | —0.7 |
| Registered electors | | 39,407 | | +364 |
| SNP gain from Conservative | | Swing | +6.7 | |

General election 1979: Galloway
| Party | Candidate | Votes | % | ±% |
|---|---|---|---|---|
| Conservative | Ian Lang | 15,306 | 45.8 | +5.6 |
| SNP | George Thompson | 12,384 | 37.1 | –3.2 |
| Liberal | David Hannay | 2,852 | 8.5 | –1.9 |
| Labour | DD Johnston | 2,841 | 8.5 | –0.5 |
| Majority | | 2,922 | 8.8 | N/A |
| Turnout | | 33,333 | 81.2 | +4.1 |
| Registered electors | | 41,110 | | +1,703 |
| Conservative gain from SNP | | Swing | +4.4 | |
