= List of listed buildings in Minnigaff, Dumfries and Galloway =

This is a list of listed buildings in the civil parish of Minnigaff in Dumfries and Galloway, Scotland.

== List ==
Name	Location	Date listed	Geo-coordinates	Notes	Category	LB number	Image
Minnigaff, Millcroft Road, 1 And 2 Reid Terrace			54°57′43″N 4°28′58″W		C(S)	19300	Upload Photo
Monigaff Parish Church Graveyard, Heron Monument			54°58′06″N 4°29′08″W		A	19313	Upload Photo
Murray's Monument			55°01′05″N 4°22′00″W		C(S)	19314	Upload Photo
Queen Mary's Bridge			54°58′18″N 4°28′50″W		B	19319	Upload Photo
Strathmaddie, Farmhouse			54°56′39″N 4°24′10″W		C(S)	19320	Upload Photo
Minnigaff, 9 Creebridge			54°57′39″N 4°28′53″W		C(S)	19283	Upload Photo
Minnigaff, 4 Creebridge			54°57′38″N 4°28′53″W		C(S)	19285	Upload Photo
Minnigaff, Millcroft Road, Minnigaff Mill			54°57′51″N 4°29′03″W		B	19299	Upload Photo
Craignine Bridge			54°58′03″N 4°24′26″W		B	17036	Upload Photo
Bargaly Bridge			54°58′17″N 4°24′17″W		C(S)	17040	Upload Photo
Bargaly, Sundial			54°58′09″N 4°24′11″W		B	17043	Upload Photo
Bargrennan Church			55°03′23″N 4°35′12″W		B	17047	Upload Photo
Mains Of Machermore, Farmhouse And Steading			54°57′03″N 4°27′45″W		C(S)	17067	Upload Photo
Minnigaff, Youth Hostel (Former School) And Boundary Walls			54°57′55″N 4°28′57″W		C(S)	19305	Upload Photo
Minnigaff, Old Minnigaff, War Memorial			54°58′00″N 4°28′58″W		C(S)	19310	Upload Photo
Minnoch Bridge			55°02′27″N 4°33′52″W		C(S)	19311	Upload Photo
Minnigaff, 7 Creebridge			54°57′39″N 4°28′52″W		C(S)	19282	Upload Photo
Minnigaff, Creebridge, Creebridge House Hotel			54°57′41″N 4°28′54″W		C(S)	19290	Upload Photo
Minnigaff, Creebridge, Ivy Bank And Railings			54°57′40″N 4°28′56″W		C(S)	19293	Upload Photo
Cairnsmore, Walled Garden			54°56′44″N 4°23′29″W		C(S)	17034	Upload Photo
Bargaly, Sundial Dated 1828			54°58′07″N 4°24′11″W		B	17044	Upload Photo
Bargaly, Walled Garden			54°58′09″N 4°24′11″W		C(S)	17046	Upload Photo
Drannandow, Farmhouse			55°00′01″N 4°31′16″W		B	17056	Upload Photo
Kirkton House			54°58′10″N 4°29′15″W		B	17061	Upload Photo
Minnigaff, The Old Schoolhouse And Boundary Walls			54°57′56″N 4°28′56″W		C(S)	19303	Upload Photo
Minnigaff, Old Edinburgh Road, Willowbank			54°57′58″N 4°28′55″W		C(S)	19306	Upload Photo
Old Bridge Of Palnure			54°57′01″N 4°24′29″W		C(S)	19316	Upload Photo
Palnure, Smiddy			54°56′30″N 4°25′04″W		C(S)	19318	Upload Photo
Minnigaff, 10 Creebridge			54°57′39″N 4°28′54″W		C(S)	19288	Upload Photo
Garlies Lodge And Motor House			55°03′41″N 4°35′00″W		C(S)	17058	Upload Photo
Minnigaff, Old Minnigaff, Elmlea			54°57′58″N 4°28′59″W		C(S)	19307	Upload Photo
Whitehills			54°58′20″N 4°29′37″W		B	19321	Upload Photo
Minnigaff, 3 Creebridge			54°57′38″N 4°28′52″W		C(S)	19280	Upload Photo
Minnigaff, 8 Creebridge			54°57′38″N 4°28′54″W		C(S)	19287	Upload Photo
Minnigaff, 12 Creebridge			54°57′39″N 4°28′54″W		C(S)	19289	Upload Photo
Cairnsmore House			54°56′49″N 4°23′27″W		B	17031	Upload Photo
Craigdews			55°01′23″N 4°20′29″W		C(S)	17035	Upload Photo
Cumloden, Glenmalloch Lodge			54°59′02″N 4°27′59″W		B	17051	Upload Photo
Cumloden Waulkmill			54°58′19″N 4°28′49″W		B	17055	Upload Photo
Glencaird			55°04′42″N 4°33′37″W		B	17059	Upload Photo
Kirroughtree House Hotel			54°57′50″N 4°27′57″W		B	17064	Upload another image See more images
Machermore Castle			54°56′58″N 4°28′21″W		B	17066	Upload Photo
Minnigaff, Millcroft Road, 4 Reid Terrace			54°57′43″N 4°28′59″W		C(S)	19301	Upload Photo
Buchan Bridge			55°05′34″N 4°28′51″W		C(S)	17030	Upload Photo
Cairnsmore Stables			54°56′47″N 4°23′21″W		B	17033	Upload Photo
Auchinleck Bridge			55°00′19″N 4°25′43″W		C(S)	17038	Upload Photo
Bargaly House			54°58′06″N 4°24′15″W		B	17041	Upload Photo
Bargaly, Tomb Of Andrew Heron			54°58′05″N 4°24′14″W		B	17045	Upload Photo
Cumloden House			54°58′43″N 4°28′28″W		A	17052	Upload another image
1-6(Inc Nos) Kirroughtree Court, Former Kirroughtree Stables			54°57′53″N 4°28′00″W		C(S)	17062	Upload Photo
Minnigaff, Millcroft Road, 6 Reid Terrace			54°57′43″N 4°28′59″W		C(S)	19304	Upload Photo
Monigaff Parish Church, Graveyard And Graveyard Walls			54°58′07″N 4°29′07″W		B	19312	Upload Photo
Minnigaff, 2 Creebridge, Ye Olde Toll Bar			54°57′38″N 4°28′53″W		C(S)	19284	Upload Photo
Minnigaff, Creebridge Dunbar House			54°57′37″N 4°28′52″W		C(S)	19291	Upload Photo
Minnigaff, Creebridge Hollenlea			54°57′39″N 4°28′56″W		C(S)	19292	Upload Photo
Cairnsmore, Open Barns			54°56′49″N 4°23′21″W		C(S)	17032	Upload Photo
Cumloden, Garden Cottage And Walled Garden			54°58′52″N 4°28′05″W		B	17037	Upload Photo
Bargaly Lodge, Gatepiers And Railings			54°58′02″N 4°24′22″W		C(S)	17042	Upload Photo
Cumloden Lodge And Gatepiers			54°58′21″N 4°28′44″W		C(S)	17053	Upload Photo
Cumloden Stables, Archway And Sundial			54°58′44″N 4°28′20″W		B	17054	Upload Photo
Minnigaff, Millcroft Road, 5 Reid Terrace			54°57′43″N 4°28′59″W		C(S)	19302	Upload Photo
Old Parish Church			54°58′06″N 4°29′06″W		B	19317	Upload Photo
Mattie White's Bridge			54°59′26″N 4°26′54″W		C(S)	19277	Upload Photo
Minnigaff, 1 Creebridge			54°57′38″N 4°28′52″W		C(S)	19279	Upload Photo
Minnigaff, 5 Creebridge, Craigdhu			54°57′39″N 4°28′52″W		C(S)	19281	Upload Photo
Minnigaff, Creebridge, Riverstead			54°57′37″N 4°28′52″W		C(S)	19295	Upload Photo
Minnigaff, Flowerbank With Quadrant And Boundary Walls And Gatepiers			54°57′47″N 4°29′00″W		C(S)	19296	Upload Photo
Minnigaff, Millcroft Road, Mill Cottage			54°57′50″N 4°29′00″W		C(S)	19298	Upload Photo
Auchinleck, House			55°00′28″N 4°25′32″W		B	17039	Upload Photo
Buchan			55°05′33″N 4°28′44″W		B	17050	Upload Photo
Garlies Castle			54°59′31″N 4°28′04″W		A	17057	Upload Photo
Glen Trool Lodge			55°05′22″N 4°29′53″W		B	17060	Upload Photo
Minnigaff, Old Minnigaff, Jacksholm And 1 Penkiln Terrace			54°57′59″N 4°29′00″W		C(S)	19308	Upload Photo
Minnigaff, Old Minnigaff, Maple Cottage			54°58′03″N 4°29′00″W		C(S)	19309	Upload Photo
Martyr's Tomb			55°04′41″N 4°30′45″W		C(S)	19276	Upload Photo
Middle Bridge Of Cree			55°03′17″N 4°35′09″W		C(S)	19278	Upload Photo
Minnigaff, 6 Creebridge			54°57′38″N 4°28′54″W		C(S)	19286	Upload Photo
Minnigaff, Creebridge, Masonfield And Railings			54°57′38″N 4°28′45″W		C(S)	19294	Upload Photo
Minnigaff, Millcroft Road, Lynbank			54°57′49″N 4°29′00″W		C(S)	19297	Upload Photo
Bargrennan, The Schoolhouse			55°03′26″N 4°35′06″W		C(S)	17048	Upload Photo
Kirroughtree, Doocot			54°57′55″N 4°28′18″W		B	17063	Upload another image See more images
Kirroughtree, Ice House			54°57′53″N 4°27′59″W		C(S)	17065	Upload Photo
Galloway Hydroelectric Power Scheme, Clatteringshaws Dam			55°03′05″N 4°16′44″W		B	51699	Upload another image

== Key ==
The scheme for classifying buildings in Scotland is:

- Category A: "buildings of national or international importance, either architectural or historic; or fine, little-altered examples of some particular period, style or building type."
- Category B: "buildings of regional or more than local importance; or major examples of some particular period, style or building type, which may have been altered."
- Category C: "buildings of local importance; lesser examples of any period, style, or building type, as originally constructed or moderately altered; and simple traditional buildings which group well with other listed buildings."

In March 2016 there were 47,288 listed buildings in Scotland. Of these, 8% were Category A, and 50% were Category B, with the remaining 42% being Category C.
