= Ethel Bristowe =

British painter (1864–1952)

Ethel Susan Graham Bristowe
- Born: 1864
- Died: 1952 (aged 89–90)
- Known for: Painting, Writing
- Spouse: S. C. Bristowe
- Children: Muriel Mary(wed to Sidney Streatfeild)

Ethel Susan Graham Bristowe, also known as E.S.G. Bristowe (1864–1952) was a British painter, and an early 20th-century author on alternative theories within Assyriology, and is most well known for her Cain-Sargon of Akkad equation theory.

She moved to Scotland in 1907 and lived for the rest of her life at Craig, a country house at Balmaclellan near Castle Douglas in Kirkcudbrightshire.

Due to the absence of an exhibition space, in 1938 Ethel Bristowe bequeathed an art gallery to the people of Castle Douglas (with several of her works). The gallery was built as an extension to the town's library on the Market Hill.

== Cain-Sargon theory ==
Bristowe is most well known for her Cain-Sargon of Akkad equation theory in her book Sargon the Magnificent (1927). In this work Bristowe reconstructs the ancient chronology of Mesopotamia based on the Cylinder of Nabonidus. The cylinder dates Naram-Sin, son of Sargon of Accad, 3200 years before Nabonidus, and so Sargon to c. 3800 BC. This sharply contrasts with mainstream scholarship which dates Sargon to the 23rd century BC. Bristowe controversially defended the earlier dating from the cylinder, to then argue Sargon was the Biblical Cain.

The Cain-Sargon theory is not at all popular with contemporary Assyriologists, but has received support from British Israelites and proponents of Christian Identity whose publishing houses reprinted Bristowe's work. A sequel was published by Bristowe in 1950 entitled Cain - An Argument.

== Works ==
- The Oldest Letters in the World (1923)
- Sargon the Magnificent (1927)
- The Man Who Built The Great Pyramid (1932)
- Naphuria - The History of the True Akhnaton (1936)
- Christ And Early Christianity Through Pagan Eyes (1937)
- Cain - An Argument (1950)

== See also ==
- Laurence Waddell
