= Wigtown Area =

Scottish lieutenancy area and former local government district

Coordinates: 54°50′N 4°45′W

Wigtown
- District (1975–1996); Lieutenancy area (1975–)
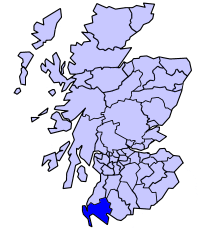
- History
  - Created: 16 May 1975
  - Abolished: 31 March 1996
  - Succeeded by: Dumfries and Galloway
  - HQ: Stranraer
- Contained within
  - Region: Dumfries and Galloway

Wigtown is a lieutenancy area in south-west Scotland and a committee area of Dumfries and Galloway Council. From 1975 until 1996 it was also a local government district. It closely resembles the historic county of Wigtownshire, covering the whole area of that county but also including the two parishes of Kirkmabreck and Minnigaff from the historic county of Kirkcudbrightshire.

== History ==
Wigtown District was created on 16 May 1975 under the Local Government (Scotland) Act 1973, which established a two-tier structure of local government across Scotland comprising upper-tier regions and lower-tier districts. Wigtown district was one of four districts created within the region of Dumfries and Galloway. The district covered all of the former administrative county of Wigtownshire plus the parishes of Kirkmabreck and Minnigaff from Kirkcudbrightshire. (Note: The 1973 Act defined the part of Kirkcudbrightshire to be included in the new district as the Western District except the Anwoth and Girthon electoral division. The Western District had only contained four parishes, being Anwoth, Girthon, Kirkmabreck, and Minnigaff, with the Anwoth and Girthon division corresponding to the combined area of those two parishes.) The 1973 Act named the new district as "Merrick" after the mountain which formed the new district's highest point, but the name was changed to Wigtown prior to the new system coming into force in 1975.

For lieutenancy purposes, the last lord-lieutenant of the county of Wigtownshire was made lord-lieutenant for the new Wigtown district when it came into effect in 1975.

Further local government reform in 1996 under the Local Government etc. (Scotland) Act 1994 saw the four districts of Dumfries and Galloway abolished, with Dumfries and Galloway Council taking over their functions. The council continues to use the former Wigtown district as an area committee, alongside committees for the other three abolished districts of Annandale and Eskdale, Nithsdale, and Stewartry. The area of the former district also continues to be used for lieutenancy purposes as the Wigtown lieutenancy area.

== Political control ==
The first election to the district council was held in 1974, initially operating as a shadow authority alongside the outgoing authorities until it came into its powers on 16 May 1975. Throughout the council's existence a majority of the seats were held by independents:

Party in control	Years
Independent	1975–1996

== Premises ==
Wigtown District Council was based at Ashwood House on Sun Street in Stranraer, which had been the main offices of the former Wigtownshire County Council prior to 1975. After the council's abolition in 1996 the building became an area office of Dumfries and Galloway Council.

== See also ==
- Wigtownshire
- Lord Lieutenant of Wigtown
