= John Brewis =

Scottish politician and barrister (1920 - 1989)

Lord Lieutenant of Wigtown
- In office 1981–1989
- Preceded by: John Dalrymple, 13th Earl of Stair
- Succeeded by: Edward Stuart Orr-Ewing

Member of Parliament for Galloway
- In office 8 October 1959 – 20 September 1974
- Preceded by: John Mackie
- Succeeded by: George Thompson

Personal details
- Born: Henry John Brewis; 8 April 1920
- Died: 25 May 1989 (aged 69)
- Party: Unionist; Conservative
- Spouse: Faith McTaggart-Stewart (m. 1949)

Henry John Brewis (8 April 1920 – 25 May 1989) was a Scottish Unionist Party politician and barrister.

== Early life ==
Brewis was born on 8 April 1920. He was the youngest child and only son of Francis Bertie Brewis, a Lieutenant-Colonel in the King's Own Yorkshire Light Infantry, and Dorothy Katharine née Walker.

His paternal grandparents were Samuel Richard Brewis of Ibstone House, Tetsworth, who was High Sheriff of Buckinghamshire, and Frances Caroline née Williams-Wynn. His maternal grandparents were Edwyn Walker and Elizabeth née Bethell.

== Career ==
He was elected as the Member of Parliament (MP) for Galloway at a by-election in April 1959, after the death of the Unionist MP John Mackie. He was re-elected at the general election in October 1959, and held the seat until he stood down at the October 1974 general election. He was also a Member of the European Parliament from 1973 to 1975.

He was Deputy Lieutenant of Wigtown from 24 January 1966 and Lord Lieutenant from 18 September 1981.

== Personal life ==
On 20 April 1949, he married Faith Agnes Devorguilla McTaggart-Stewart (1926–1998), a daughter of Sir Edward McTaggart-Stewart, 2nd Baronet of Southwick and Blairderry and a granddaughter of Gilbert Clifton-Hastings-Campbell, 3rd Baron Donington. Together, they were the parents of:

- Francis Roger MacTaggart Brewis (1950–2014)
- Ralph Michael Rodney Brewis (b. 1951)
- Sylvia Katharine Moira Brewis (b. 1952)
- Christopher Mark John Brewis (b. 1956)

Brewis died on 25 May 1989.

Parliament of the United Kingdom
Preceded by John Mackie	Member of Parliament for Galloway; 1959–Oct 1974	Succeeded by George Thompson
Honorary titles
Preceded by The 13th Earl of Stair	Lord Lieutenant of Wigtown; 1981–1989	Succeeded by Edward Stuart Orr-Ewing
