= Ian Lang, Baron Lang of Monkton =

British politician (born 1940)

The Right Honourable The Lord Lang of Monkton PC DL
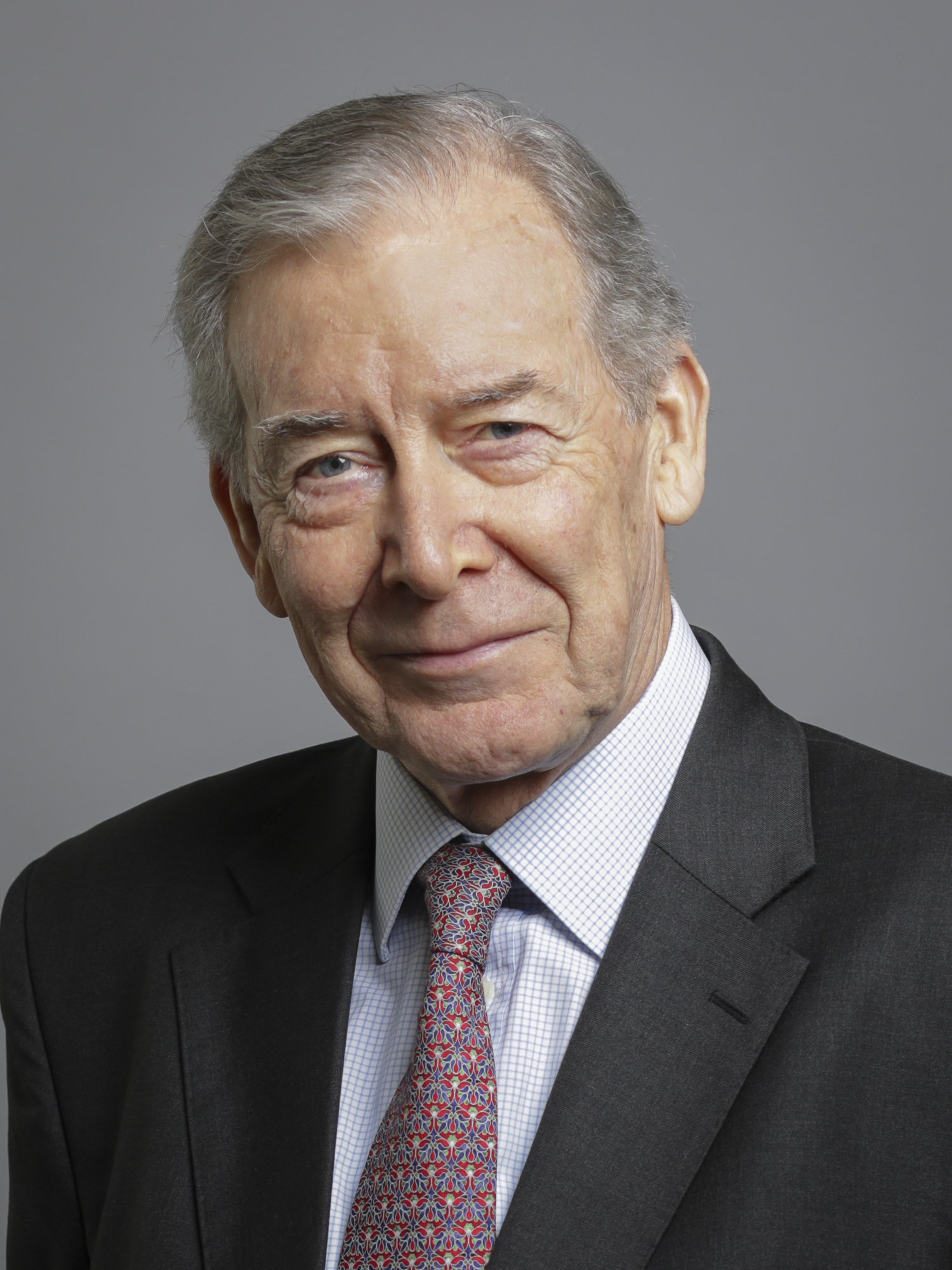
- Official portrait, 2020

Secretary of State for Trade and Industry President of the Board of Trade
- In office 5 July 1995 – 2 May 1997
- Prime Minister: John Major
- Preceded by: Michael Heseltine
- Succeeded by: Margaret Beckett

Secretary of State for Scotland
- In office 28 November 1990 – 5 July 1995
- Prime Minister: John Major
- Preceded by: Malcolm Rifkind
- Succeeded by: Michael Forsyth

Member of Parliament for Galloway and Upper Nithsdale Galloway (1979–1983)
- In office 3 May 1979 – 8 April 1997
- Preceded by: George Thompson
- Succeeded by: Alasdair Morgan

Member of the House of Lords
- Lord Temporal
- Life peerage 29 September 1997 – 30 June 2022

Personal details
- Born: 27 June 1940 (age 86)
- Education: Sidney Sussex College, Cambridge

Ian Bruce Lang, Baron Lang of Monkton, PC DL (born 27 June 1940) is a British Conservative Party politician and Life Peer who served as the Member of Parliament for Galloway, and then Galloway and Upper Nithsdale, from 1979 to 1997.

On 29 September 1997 Lang was raised to the peerage. He was an active member of the House of Lords until his retirement on 30 June 2022, including being the Chairman of the Constitution Committee. He also served as Chair of the Advisory Committee on Business Appointments from 2009 to 2014.

== Early life ==
Lang was educated at Lathallan School, at Rugby School from 1954 to 1958, and at Sidney Sussex College, Cambridge, from 1959 to 1962, where he obtained a BA (Hons.) degree in history. He was also a member of the Cambridge Footlights.

== Parliamentary career ==
Lang first stood for Parliament for Central Ayrshire in 1970, but was unsuccessful. In the February 1974 general election he was defeated by Labour's James White contesting Glasgow Pollok.

Following this he became MP for Galloway from 1979 to 1983 and for Galloway and Upper Nithsdale from 1983 to 1997, and was a minister for a number of years. He served as Assistant Government Whip from 1981 to 1983 and as Government Whip from 1983 to 1986, before becoming Under-Secretary of State for Employment in 1986. He then served as Under-Secretary of State for Scotland from 1986 to 1987, before rising to the position of Minister of State for Scotland, which he held from 1987 to 1990. Lang then joined the Cabinet as Secretary of State for Scotland from 1990 to 1995, steering the Natural Heritage (Scotland) Bill through Parliament in 1991. He served as Secretary of State for Trade and Industry and President of the Board of Trade from 1995 until 1997. He was closely involved in John Major's re-election campaign as leader of the Conservative Party in July 1995.

Lang lost his seat in the 1997 general election, one of seven Cabinet members to do so (the others being Malcolm Rifkind, Michael Portillo, Michael Forsyth, Roger Freeman, William Waldegrave and Tony Newton).

== House of Lords ==
Following the loss of his seat, Lang was raised to the peerage in the 1997 Prime Minister's Resignation Honours as Baron Lang of Monkton, of Merrick and the Rhinns of Kells in Dumfries and Galloway. He has remained an active member of the House of Lords, including being Chairman of the Constitution Committee between 2014 and 2017.

Previously Lang served as Chair of the Advisory Committee on Business Appointments from 2009 to 2014.

Since 1997, Lang has been a member of the board of directors of Marsh & McLennan Companies, becoming Chairman in May 2011. Lang has also been a Non-Executive Director of Charlemagne Capital Limited since 2006, and Deputy Chairman of European Telecom PLC since 1997.

On 30 January 2014 Lang stated that if Scotland voted for independence, it would dishonour the sacrifice of those who died fighting for Great Britain in the First World War.

== Arms ==
Coat of arms of Ian Lang, Baron Lang of Monkton
Coronet Coronet of a Baron Crest A Stock Dove holding in the beak an Olive Branch slipped and leaved, all proper. Escutcheon Tierced per fess Vert Azure and Vert, two Thistle Stalks slipped and leaved fesswise and conjoined at the bases Argent, at the centre point, between two Acorns slipped and leaved Or, in chief and a Three Masted Sailing Ship sails furled in base Or, and at the honour point a Fleur-de-lis Or. Motto SOIS VRAI (Be true)

Parliament of the United Kingdom
Preceded by George Thompson	Member of Parliament for Galloway; 1979–1983	Constituency abolished
New constituency	Member of Parliament for Galloway and Upper Nithsdale; 1983–1997	Succeeded by Alasdair Morgan
Political offices
Preceded by Malcolm Rifkind	Secretary of State for Scotland; 1990–1995	Succeeded by Michael Forsyth
Preceded by Michael Heseltine	President of the Board of Trade; 1995–1997	Succeeded by Margaret Beckett
Orders of precedence in the United Kingdom
Preceded by The Lord Newby	Gentlemen; Baron Lang of Monkton	Followed by The Lord Blackwell
