= John Mackie (Scottish Unionist politician) =

Scottish Unionist Member of Parliament (MP)

John Hamilton Mackie (8 January 1898 – 29 December 1958) was a Scottish Unionist Party Member of Parliament (MP) for Galloway from 1931 to 1958.

He was a member of the antisemitic and pro-Nazi Right Club established by Archibald Maule Ramsay in 1938.

Having been refused a Conservative nomination at the 1945 general election, Mackie was re-elected and sat as an "Independent Unionist" from 1945 to 1948. The Conservative whip was restored in 1948 and he continued to represent Galloway until his death.

Parliament of the United Kingdom
Preceded by Cecil Randolph Dudgeon	Member of Parliament for Galloway; 1931–1958	Succeeded by John Brewis
