= Lieutenancy areas of Scotland =

Subdivisions in Scotland used by the British monarch's representatives

The lieutenancy areas of Scotland are the areas used for the ceremonial lord-lieutenant, the monarch's representative in Scotland's Lieutenancy areas. The lords-lieutenant titles, chosen by the monarch and his legal advisers, are mainly based on placenames of the traditional counties of Scotland. In 1794, permanent lieutenancies were established by Royal Warrant. By the Militia Act 1797 (37 Geo.3, C.103), the lieutenants appointed "for the Counties, Stewartries, Cities, and Places" were given powers to raise and command County Militia Units.

While in their lieutenancies, lords-lieutenant are among the few individuals in Scotland officially permitted to fly a banner of the Royal Arms of Scotland, the "Lion Rampant" as it is more commonly known.

Lieutenancy areas are different from the current local government council areas and their committee areas. They also differ from other subdivisions of Scotland including sheriffdoms and former regions and districts.

The Lord Provosts of Aberdeen, Dundee, Edinburgh, and Glasgow also act ex officio as lord-lieutenants. This is a unique right in the United Kingdom: all other lord-lieutenants are appointed by the monarch, rather than being elected politicians.

== List ==
Lieutenancy areas of Scotland
1. Aberdeen; 2. Aberdeenshire; 3. Angus; 4. Argyll and Bute; 5. Ayrshire and Arran; 6. Banffshire; 7. Berwickshire; 8. Caithness; 9. Clackmannanshire; 10. Dumfries; 11. Dunbartonshire; 12. Dundee; 13. East Lothian; 14. Edinburgh; 15. Fife; 16. Glasgow; 17. Inverness; 18. Kincardineshire; 19. Lanarkshire; 20. Midlothian; 21. Moray; 22. Nairn; 23. Perth and Kinross; 24. Renfrewshire; 25. Ross and Cromarty; 26. Roxburgh, Ettrick and Lauderdale; 27. Stirling and Falkirk; 28. Sutherland; 29. Stewartry of Kirkcudbright; 30. Tweeddale; 31. West Lothian; 32. Western Isles; 33. Wigtown; Not shown: Orkney; Shetland

== Definition of the areas ==
Each Lord-Lieutenant of a county holding office immediately prior to the local government reorganisation of Scotland on 16 May 1975 was appointed to an area (usually the traditional county area or something very similar to it) within the regions and districts which were established on that date. The lieutenancy areas were not given names in the 1975 order transferring the lieutenancies. When local government was reorganised again on 1 April 1996, the lieutenancy areas remained essentially the same, with minor border adjustments in some based on new council area boundaries. The order transferring the lieutenancies in 1996 gave each lieutenancy a name, usually taken from the names of the pre-1975 counties which roughly correspond to the lieutenancy areas. Some lieutenancy names differ though, with the pre-1975 county of Peeblesshire now corresponding to a lieutenancy of Tweeddale.

Pre-1975 lieutenancy (County)	Current Lieutenancy area	Former region	Definition
Aberdeenshire	Aberdeenshire	Grampian	The County of Aberdeen as existing before 16 May 1975, except that part in the City of Aberdeen
Angus	Angus	Tayside	District of Angus
Argyll	Argyll and Bute	Strathclyde	District of Argyll and Bute
Ayr	Ayrshire and Arran	Strathclyde	Districts of Cunninghame, Kilmarnock and Loudoun, Kyle and Carrick and Cumnock and Doon Valley
Banffshire	Banffshire	Grampian	The county of Banffshire as existing before 16 May 1975
Berwick	Berwickshire	Borders	District of Berwickshire
Caithness	Caithness	Highland	District of Caithness
Clackmannan	Clackmannanshire	Central	District of Clackmannan
Dumfries	Dumfries	Dumfries and Galloway	Districts of Nithsdale and Annandale and Eskdale
Dunbarton	Dunbartonshire (Note: The county and lieutenancy area is spelt with "N" (Dunbartonshire) and the town with "M" (Dumbarton).)	Strathclyde	Districts of Dumbarton, Clydebank, Bearsden and Milngavie, Strathkelvin and Cumbernauld and Kilsyth
East Lothian	East Lothian	Lothian	District of East Lothian
Fife	Fife	Fife	Entire region
Inverness	Inverness	Highland	Districts of Lochaber, Inverness and Badenoch and Strathspey
Kincardineshire	Kincardineshire	Grampian	The county of Kincardineshire as existing before 16 May 1975, except that part in the City of Aberdeen
Kinross (held jointly with Perth)	Perth and Kinross	Tayside	District of Perth and Kinross
Stewartry of Kirkcudbright	Stewartry of Kirkcudbright	Dumfries and Galloway	District of Stewartry
Lanark	Lanarkshire	Strathclyde	Districts of Monklands, Motherwell, Hamilton, East Kilbride and Lanark
Midlothian	Midlothian	Lothian	District of Midlothian
Moray	Moray	Grampian	The county of Moray as existing before 16 May 1975, excluding the parts in Highland (being the pre-1975 burgh of Grantown-on-Spey and district of Cromdale)
Nairn	Nairn	Highland	District of Nairn
Orkney	Orkney	Orkney Islands Area	Entire area
Peebles	Tweeddale	Borders	District of Tweeddale
Perth (held jointly with Kinross)	Perth and Kinross	Tayside	District of Perth and Kinross
Renfrew	Renfrewshire	Strathclyde	Districts of Eastwood, Renfrew and Inverclyde
Ross and Cromarty	Ross and Cromarty	Highland	Districts of Ross and Cromarty and Skye and Lochalsh
Roxburgh (held jointly with Selkirk)	Roxburgh, Ettrick and Lauderdale	Borders	District of Roxburgh
Selkirk (held jointly with Roxburgh)	Roxburgh, Ettrick and Lauderdale	Borders	District of Ettrick and Lauderdale
Stirling	Stirling and Falkirk	Central	Districts of Stirling and Falkirk
Sutherland	Sutherland	Highland	District of Sutherland
West Lothian	West Lothian	Lothian	District of West Lothian
Inverness (parts of it are held jointly with parts of Ross and Cromarty)	Western Isles	Western Isles Islands Area	Entire area
Wigtown	Wigtown	Dumfries and Galloway	District of Wigtown
Zetland	Shetland	Shetland Islands Area	Entire area

== See also ==
- Subdivisions of Scotland
- List of burghs in Scotland
- List of places in Scotland
