= 1959 Galloway by-election =

UK by-election

The 1959 Galloway by-election of 9 April 1959 was held after the death of Unionist member of parliament (MP) John Mackie:

The seat was safe, having been won by the Unionists at the 1955 general election by 8,014 votes

== Result of the previous general election ==
General election 1955: Galloway
Party	Candidate	Votes	%	±%
Unionist	John Mackie	15,893	66.86	+5.23
Labour	W S Gray	7,879	33.14	+6.80
Majority		8,014	33.72	−1.43
Turnout		23,772		
Unionist hold		Swing		

== Result of the by-election ==
By-election 1959: Galloway
Party	Candidate	Votes	%	±%
Unionist	John Brewis	13,204	49.93	−16.93
Liberal	Simon Mackay	6,721	25.42	New
Labour	W Cross	6,520	24.65	−8.49
Majority		6,483	24.51	−9.21
Turnout		26,445		
Unionist hold		Swing		

== Aftermath ==
The Glasgow Herald stated that the initial reaction to the result among the political parties was "Government satisfaction, Liberal jubilation, and Labour despondency." However, the same newspaper also noted that while Conservatives would be happy to have held the seat with a "substantial majority", the Liberal performance would worry them. The result indicated that the Liberals were maintaining their recent trend of polling well in by-elections. The Conservatives were reported to fear that if this trend in Liberal candidates taking votes from their party continued, it could allow Labour to win the next general election, if the Liberals fielded 200 candidates.
