= Newton Stewart =

Town in Dumfries and Galloway, Scotland

Coordinates: 54.958°N 4.492°W

Newton Stewart: Scottish Gaelic: Baile Ùr nan Stiùbhartach
- Town
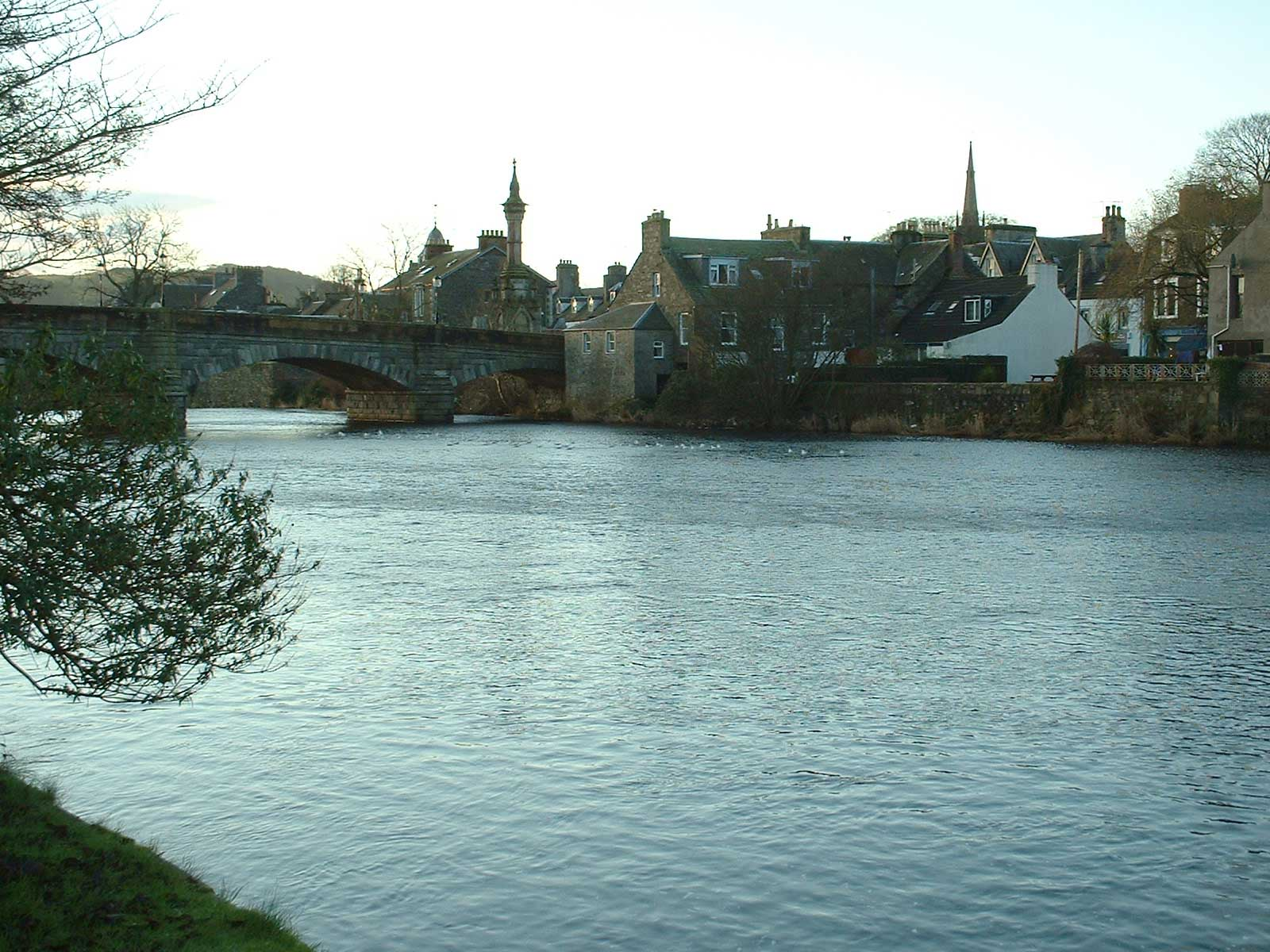
- The River Cree with Newton Stewart beyond

- Location within Dumfries and Galloway
- Area: 1.94 km^{2} (0.75 sq mi)
- Population: 3,954 (2022)
  - Density: 2,038/km^{2} (5,280/sq mi)
- OS grid reference: NX405655
  - Edinburgh: 85 mi (137 km)
  - London: 299 mi (481 km)
- Council area: Dumfries and Galloway
- Lieutenancy area: Wigtownshire
- Country: Scotland
- Sovereign state: United Kingdom
- Post town: NEWTON STEWART
- Postcode district: DG8
- Dialling code: 01671
- Police: Scotland
- Fire: Scottish
- Ambulance: Scottish
- UK Parliament: Dumfries and Galloway
- Scottish Parliament: Galloway and West Dumfries

Newton Stewart (Gd: Baile Ùr nan Stiùbhartach) is a market town and former burgh in Dumfries and Galloway, Scotland. Historically part of Wigtownshire, The town is on the River Cree with most of the town to the west of the river, and is sometimes referred to as the "Gateway to the Galloway Hills". It had a population of 3,954 in 2022.

The main local industries are agriculture, forestry and tourism. The town hosts a local market, and a number of services to support the farming industry. There are many mountain biking trails in the area. Newton Stewart lies on the southern edge of the Galloway Forest Park, which supplies many jobs to the town. Newton Stewart is 7 miles (11 kilometres) from Scotland's book town Wigtown.

== History ==
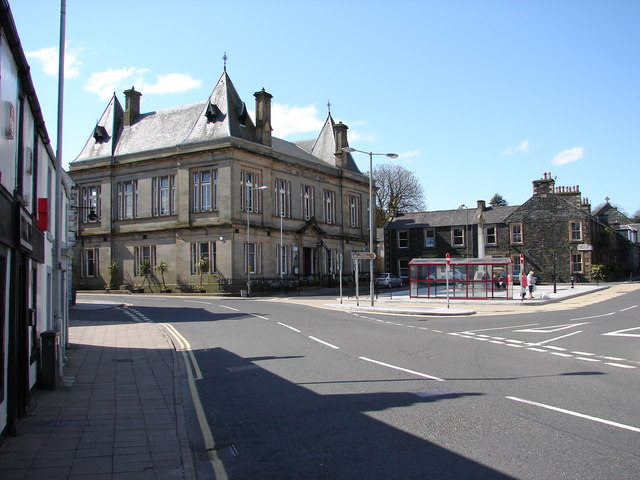
The McMillan Hall in Dashwood Square

The town was founded in the mid-17th century by William Stewart, fourth and youngest son of the 2nd Earl of Galloway. The "New Town of Stewart" was granted burgh status by charter from King Charles II, allowing a weekly market and two annual fairs to be held.

It was on a pilgrimage to the shrine of St Ninian at Whithorn in 1329 that Robert the Bruce forded the river where the present bridge stands. Designed by John Rennie the Elder and built in 1813 the present bridge replaced the old bridge of 1745.

The industrialist Sir William Douglas (died 1809), best known for founding the planned town of Castle Douglas, also established cotton mills in Newton Stewart, which was renamed "Newton Douglas" in his honour but soon reverted to Newton Stewart.

The main municipal building in the town, the McMillan Hall, was completed in 1885.

== Transport ==
The A75 road runs along the southern edge of the town, and connects the town to Stranraer in the west and Dumfries in the east. Public transport in and around the town and to places in South Ayrshire and Dumfries & Galloway is mainly provided by Stagecoach Western.

Newton Stewart railway station was on the Portpatrick and Wigtownshire Joint Railway and closed in 1965, as a result of the Beeching Axe. The nearest railway stations are at Stranraer and Barrhill which are respectively 25 mi (40 km) and 18 1/2 mi (30 km) from Newton Stewart.

== Education ==
Newton Stewart has two primary schools:

- Penninghame Primary School
- Minnigaff Primary School

The town has one secondary school, the Douglas Ewart High School. St Ninian's once used to be in the town, before it closed permanently in 2024.

== Media ==
Local news and television programmes are provided by BBC Scotland and ITV Border. Television signals are received from one of the two local relay transmitters (Minnigaff and Cambret Hill).

Local radio stations are BBC Radio Scotland on 93.1 FM and Greatest Hits Radio Dumfries & Galloway on 103.0 FM.

The Galloway Gazette and Dumfries & Galloway Standard are the town's local newspapers.

The horror film The Wicker Man, set on the fictional privately owned Scottish island of Summerisle, was filmed almost entirely (some opening scenes filmed in Plockton, Wester Ross also) on location around Newton Stewart, and had its premiere at its cinema in 1973.

== Tourism ==
There are numerous nature trails nearby as part of Galloway Forest Park, managed on behalf of the state by Forest Enterprise.

Home of the Trad Music Festival which takes place over three days the 2nd weekend in July each year, the SpringGrass Bluegrass Festival in May each year and the Autumn Trad Festival in October each year at The Vault Arts Centre.

== Sport ==
Newton Stewart FC, nicknamed the "Creesiders", play in the South of Scotland league, their ground is called Blairmount Park.

== Notable people ==
- The artist and musician Bill Drummond of the KLF and K Foundation grew up in the town.
- Scottish Under 23 international footballer Ian Gibson (1943–2016), played for Middlesbrough, Coventry City and Cardiff City amongst others.
- Educationalist Prof William Wither McClelland (1889–1968) professor of Education at St Andrews University.
- Lieutenant General Sydney Rigby Wason (1887 – 1969), a senior officer in the Second World War.
