= Results of the 1987 United Kingdom general election =

The results of the 1987 United Kingdom general election, by parliamentary constituency were as follows:

Constituency	Cnty	Rgn	Last elctn	Winning party				Turnout (Note: Excludes spoilt ballots)	Votes											
Constituency	Cnty	Rgn	Last elctn	Party	Votes	Share	Majrty	Turnout	Con	Lab (Note: Excludes Speaker) (Note: Includes Labour Party and allied Co-operative Party)	SDP-Lib	SNP	UUP	SDLP	PC	Grn	DUP	SF	Other (Note: Includes all other parties, all independent candidates and the Speaker)	Total
Aberavon	WGM	WLS	Lab	Lab	27,126	66.8%	20,609	77.7%	5,861	27,126	6,517				1,124					40,628
Aberdeen North	ADC	SCT	Lab	Lab	24,145	54.7%	16,278	69.9%	6,330	24,145	7,867	5,827								44,169
Aberdeen South	ADC	SCT	Con	Lab	15,917	37.7%	1,198	67.1%	14,719	15,917	8,844	2,776								42,256
Aldershot	HAM	SE	Con	Con	35,272	59.0%	17,784	74.0%	35,272	7,061	17,488									59,822
Aldridge-Brownhills	WMD	WM	Con	Con	26,434	53.4%	12,936	79.8%	26,434	14,038	9,084									49,556
Altrincham and Sale	GTM	NW	Con	Con	27,746	53.5%	14,228	76.7%	27,746	10,617	13,518									51,881
Alyn and Deeside	CLY	WLS	Lab	Lab	22,916	48.6%	6,416	80.4%	16,500	22,916	7,273				478					47,167
Amber Valley	DBY	EM	Con	Con	28,603	51.4%	9,500	81.2%	28,603	19,103	7,904									55,610
Angus East	AGS	SCT	Con	SNP	19,536	42.4%	1,544	75.5%	17,992	4,971	3,592	19,536								46,091
Argyll and Bute	AYB	SCT	Con	Lib	13,726	37.3%	1,394	75.5%	12,332	4,437	13,726	6,297								36,792
Arundel	WSX	SE	Con	Con	34,356	61.3%	18,880	71.2%	34,356	6,177	15,476									56,009
Ashfield	NTT	EM	Lab	Lab	22,812	41.7%	4,400	77.2%	18,412	22,812	13,542									54,756
Ashford	KNT	SE	Con	Con	29,978	56.5%	15,488	75.7%	29,978	7,775	14,490					778				53,021
Ashton-under-Lyne	GTM	NW	Lab	Lab	22,389	51.8%	9,286	74.0%	13,103	22,389	7,760									43,250
Aylesbury	BKM	SE	Con	Con	32,970	57.5%	16,558	74.5%	32,970	7,936	16,412									57,318
Ayr	EAR	SCT	Con	Con	20,942	39.4%	182	79.9%	20,942	20,760	7,859	3,548								53,109
Banbury	OXF	SE	Con	Con	29,716	56.2%	17,330	76.2%	29,716	10,789	12,386									52,891
Banff and Buchan	ADS	SCT	Con	SNP	19,462	44.3%	2,441	70.8%	17,021	3,281	4,211	19,462								43,975
Barking	LND	LND	Lab	Lab	15,307	44.3%	3,409	66.9%	11,898	15,307	7,366									34,541
Barnsley Central	SYK	YTH	Lab	Lab	26,139	66.8%	19,051	70.0%	7,088	26,139	5,928									37,548
Barnsley East	SYK	YTH	Lab	Lab	29,948	74.5%	23,511	72.6%	5,437	29,948	4,482									39,867
Barnsley West and Penistone	SYK	YTH	Lab	Lab	26,498	57.4%	14,191	75.7%	12,307	26,498	7,409									46,214
Barrow and Furness	CMA	NW	Con	Con	25,431	46.5%	3,927	79.0%	25,431	21,504	7,799									54,731
Basildon	ESS	E	Con	Con	21,858	43.5%	2,649	73.3%	21,858	19,209	9,139									50,206
Basingstoke	HAM	SE	Con	Con	33,657	56.0%	17,893	77.0%	33,657	10,632	15,764									60,053
Bassetlaw	NTT	EM	Lab	Lab	25,385	48.1%	5,613	77.6%	19,772	25,385	7,616									52,773
Bath	AVN	SW	Con	Con	23,515	45.4%	1,412	79.4%	23,515	5,507	22,103					687				51,812
Batley and Spen	WYK	YTH	Con	Con	25,512	43.4%	1,362	79.0%	25,512	24,150	8,372								689	58,723
Battersea	LND	LND	Lab	Con	20,945	44.2%	857	70.7%	20,945	20,088	5,634					559			116	47,342
Beaconsfield	BKM	SE	Con	Con	33,324	66.0%	21,339	74.6%	33,324	5,203	11,985									50,512
Beckenham	LND	LND	Con	Con	24,903	56.3%	13,464	72.8%	24,903	7,888	11,439									44,230
Belfast East	NIR	NIR	DUP	DUP	20,372	61.9%	9,798	60.2%									20,372	649	11,888	32,909
Belfast North	NIR	NIR	UUP	UUP	14,355	39.0%	8,560	62.3%					14,355	5,795				5,062	11,604	36,816
Belfast South	NIR	NIR	UUP	UUP	18,917	57.8%	11,954	60.3%					18,917	4,268				1,030	8,491	32,706
Belfast West	NIR	NIR	SF	SF	16,862	41.1%	2,221	69.1%					7,646	14,641				16,862	1,819	40,968
Berwick-upon-Tweed	NBL	NE	Lib	Lib	21,903	52.1%	9,503	77.3%	12,400	7,360	21,903					379				42,042
Bethnal Green and Stepney	LND	LND	Lab	Lab	15,490	48.3%	5,284	57.6%	6,176	15,490	10,206								232	32,104
Beverley	HUM	YTH	Con	Con	31,459	52.2%	12,595	76.3%	31,459	9,901	18,864									60,224
Bexhill and Battle	SXE	SE	Con	Con	33,570	66.5%	20,519	77.4%	33,570	3,903	13,051									50,524
Bexleyheath	LND	LND	Con	Con	24,866	53.7%	11,687	77.8%	24,866	8,218	13,179									46,263
Billericay	ESS	E	Con	Con	33,741	54.9%	17,986	77.2%	33,741	11,942	15,755									61,438
Birkenhead	MSY	NW	Lab	Lab	27,883	58.7%	15,372	72.3%	12,511	27,883	7,095									47,489
Birmingham Edgbaston	WMD	WM	Con	Con	18,595	49.8%	8,581	68.6%	18,595	10,014	7,843					559			307	37,318
Birmingham Erdington	WMD	WM	Lab	Lab	17,037	45.9%	2,467	68.5%	14,570	17,037	5,530									37,137
Birmingham Hall Green	WMD	WM	Con	Con	20,478	44.9%	7,621	74.7%	20,478	12,857	12,323									45,658
Birmingham Hodge Hill	WMD	WM	Lab	Lab	19,872	48.7%	4,789	68.9%	15,083	19,872	5,868									40,823
Birmingham Ladywood	WMD	WM	Lab	Lab	21,971	57.7%	10,028	64.8%	11,943	21,971	3,532					650				38,096
Birmingham Northfield	WMD	WM	Con	Con	24,024	45.1%	3,135	72.6%	24,024	20,889	8,319									53,232
Birmingham Perry Barr	WMD	WM	Lab	Lab	25,894	50.4%	6,933	69.6%	18,961	25,894	6,514									51,369
Birmingham Selly Oak	WMD	WM	Con	Con	23,305	44.2%	2,584	73.1%	23,305	20,721	8,128					611				52,765
Birmingham Small Heath	WMD	WM	Lab	Lab	22,787	66.3%	15,521	60.6%	7,266	22,787	3,600					559			154	34,366
Birmingham Sparkbrook	WMD	WM	Lab	Lab	20,513	60.8%	11,859	63.5%	8,654	20,513	3,803					526			229	33,725
Birmingham Yardley	WMD	WM	Con	Con	17,931	42.6%	2,522	73.9%	17,931	15,409	8,734									42,074
Bishop Auckland	DUR	NE	Lab	Lab	25,648	48.0%	7,035	74.1%	18,613	25,648	9,195									53,456
Blaby	LEI	EM	Con	Con	27,732	60.5%	22,176	80.9%	27,732	9,046	15,556									62,334
Blackburn	LAN	NW	Lab	Lab	27,965	49.9%	5,497	74.9%	22,468	27,965	5,602									56,035
Blackpool North	LAN	NW	Con	Con	20,680	48.0%	7,321	73.1%	20,680	13,359	9,032									43,071
Blackpool South	LAN	NW	Con	Con	20,312	48.0%	6,744	73.5%	20,312	13,568	8,405									42,285
Blaenau Gwent	GNT	WLS	Lab	Lab	32,820	75.9%	27,861	77.2%	4,959	32,820	3,847				1,621					43,247
Blaydon	TWR	NE	Lab	Lab	25,277	50.3%	12,488	75.7%	12,147	25,277	12,789									50,213
Blyth Valley	NBL	NE	Lab	Lab	19,604	42.5%	853	78.1%	7,823	19,604	18,751									46,178
Bolsover	DBY	EM	Lab	Lab	28,453	56.2%	14,120	77.3%	14,333	28,453	7,836									50,622
Bolton North East	GTM	NW	Con	Con	20,742	44.4%	813	78.7%	20,742	19,929	6,060									46,731
Bolton South East	GTM	NW	Lab	Lab	26,791	54.3%	11,381	74.9%	15,410	26,791	7,161									49,362
Bolton West	GTM	NW	Con	Con	24,779	44.3%	4,593	80.0%	24,779	20,186	10,936									55,901
Boothferry	HUM	YTH	Con	Con	31,716	55.7%	18,970	75.8%	31,716	12,498	12,746									56,960
Bootle	MSY	NW	Lab	Lab	24,975	66.9%	24,477	72.9%	10,498	24,975	6,820									52,293
Bosworth	LEI	EM	Con	Con	34,145	54.4%	17,016	81.3%	34,145	10,787	17,129					660				62,721
Bournemouth East	DOR	SW	Con	Con	30,925	58.3%	14,683	70.5%	30,925	5,885	16,242									53,052
Bournemouth West	DOR	SW	Con	Con	30,117	55.2%	12,651	73.4%	30,117	7,018	17,466									54,601
Bow and Poplar	LND	LND	Lab	Lab	15,746	46.4%	4,631	57.4%	6,810	15,746	11,115								274	33,945
Bradford North	WYK	YTH	Con	Lab	21,009	42.8%	1,633	72.7%	19,376	21,009	8,656									49,041
Bradford South	WYK	YTH	Lab	Lab	21,230	41.4%	309	73.7%	20,921	21,230	9,109									51,260
Bradford West	WYK	YTH	Lab	Lab	25,775	51.9%	7,551	70.2%	18,224	25,775	5,657									49,656
Braintree	ESS	E	Con	Con	32,978	54.2%	16,857	79.1%	32,978	11,764	16,121									60,863
Brecon and Radnor	POW	WLS	Con	Lib	14,509	34.8%	56	84.3%	14,453	12,180	14,509				535					41,677
Brent East	LND	LND	Lab	Lab	16,772	42.6%	1,653	64.5%	15,119	16,772	5,710					716			1,035	39,352
Brent North	LND	LND	Con	Con	26,823	59.9%	15,720	71.0%	26,823	11,103	6,868									44,794
Brent South	LND	LND	Lab	Lab	21,140	51.9%	7,931	64.9%	13,209	21,140	6,375									38,007
Brentford and Isleworth	LND	LND	Con	Con	26,230	47.7%	7,953	76.7%	26,230	18,277	9,626					849				54,983
Brentwood and Ongar	ESS	E	Con	Con	32,258	60.5%	18,921	79.0%	32,258	7,042	13,337					686				53,323
Bridgend	MGM	WLS	Con	Lab	21,893	47.5%	4,380	80.3%	17,513	21,893	5,590				1,065					46,061
Bridgwater	SOM	SW	Con	Con	27,177	51.5%	11,195	78.2%	27,177	9,594	15,982									52,753
Bridlington	HUM	YTH	Con	Con	32,351	54.8%	17,321	73.7%	32,351	10,653	15,030					983				59,017
Brigg and Cleethorpes	HUM	YTH	Con	Con	29,723	48.7%	12,248	76.2%	29,723	13,876	17,475									61,074
Brighton Kemptown	SXE	SE	Con	Con	24,031	53.5%	9,260	74.5%	24,031	14,771	6,080									44,882
Brighton Pavilion	SXE	SE	Con	Con	22,056	50.8%	9,142	73.7%	22,056	12,914	8,459									43,416
Bristol East	AVN	SW	Con	Con	21,906	43.6%	4,123	78.7%	21,906	17,783	10,247								286	50,222
Bristol North West	AVN	SW	Con	Con	26,953	46.6%	6,952	79.4%	26,953	20,001	10,885									57,839
Bristol South	AVN	SW	Lab	Lab	20,798	40.9%	1,404	74.1%	19,394	20,798	9,952					600			149	50,893
Bristol West	AVN	SW	Con	Con	24,695	45.5%	7,703	75.0%	24,695	11,337	16,992					1,096			134	54,254
Bromsgrove	WOR	WM	Con	Con	29,051	54.7%	16,685	76.4%	29,051	12,366	11,663									53,080
Broxbourne	HRT	E	Con	Con	33,567	63.2%	22,995	75.2%	33,567	8,984	10,572									53,123
Broxtowe	NTT	EM	Con	Con	30,462	53.6%	16,651	79.2%	30,462	13,811	12,562									71,780
Buckingham	BKM	SE	Con	Con	32,162	58.6%	18,526	78.3%	32,162	9,053	13,636									54,851
Burnley	LAN	SW	Lab	Lab	25,140	48.4%	7,557	78.8%	17,583	25,140	9,241									51,964
Burton	STS	WM	Con	Con	29,160	50.7%	9,830	78.6%	29,160	19,330	9,046									57,536
Bury North	GTM	SW	Con	Con	28,097	50.1%	6,911	82.5%	28,097	21,186	6,804									56,087
Bury South	GTM	SW	Con	Con	23,878	46.0%	2,679	79.7%	23,878	21,199	6,772									51,849
Bury St Edmunds	SFK	E	Con	Con	33,672	59.3%	21,458	74.1%	33,672	9,841	12,214					1,057				56,784
Caernarvon	GWN	WLS	PC	PC	20,338	57.1%	12,812	57.1%	7,526	5,652	2,103				20,338					35,619
Caerphilly	GNT	WLS	Lab	Lab	28,698	58.4%	19,167	76.6%	9,531	28,698	6,923				3,955					49,107
Caithness and Sutherland	HLD	SCT	SDP	SDP	12,338	53.7%	8,494	73.6%	3,844	3,437	12,338	2,371				333			686	23,009
Calder Valley	WYK	YTH	Con	Con	25,892	43.5%	6,045	81.1%	25,892	19,847	13,761									59,500
Cambridge	CAM	E	Con	Con	21,624	40.0%	5,060	78.0%	21,624	15,319	16,564					597				54,104
Cannock and Burntwood	STS	WM	Con	Con	24,186	44.5%	2,689	79.8%	24,186	21,497	8,698									54,381
Canterbury	KNT	SE	Con	Con	30,273	53.8%	14,891	74.0%	30,273	9,494	15,382					947			157	56,255
Cardiff Central	SGM	WLS	Con	Con	15,241	37.1%	1,986	77.6%	15,241	13,255	12,062				535					41,093
Cardiff North	SGM	WLS	Con	Con	20,061	45.3%	8,234	81.0%	20,061	11,827	11,725				692					44,305
Cardiff South and Penarth	SGM	WLS	Lab	Lab	20,956	46.7%	4,574	76.4%	16,382	20,956	6,900				599					44,837
Cardiff West	SGM	WLS	Con	Lab	20,329	45.5%	4,045	77.8%	16,284	20,329	7,300				736					44,649
Carlisle	CMA	NW	Lab	Lab	18,311	42.2%	916	78.8%	17,395	18,311	7,655									43,359
Carmarthen	DFD	WLS	Lab	Lab	19,128	35.4%	4,317	82.9%	14,811	19,128	7,203				12,457	481				54,080
Carrick, Cumnock and Doon Valley	EAR	SCT	Lab	Lab	25,669	60.1%	16,802	75.8%	8,867	25,669	4,106	4,094								42,736
Carshalton and Wallington	LND	LND	Con	Con	27,984	54.0%	14,409	74.2%	27,984	9,440	13,575					843				51,842
Castle Point	ESS	E	Con	Con	29,681	59.9%	19,248	74.5%	29,681	9,422	10,433									49,536
Central Fife	FIF	SCT	Lab	Lab	22,827	53.4%	15,709	72.6%	7,118	22,827	6,487	6,296								42,728
Ceredigion and Pembroke North	DFD	WLS	Lib	Lib	17,683	36.6%	4,700	76.5%	12,983	8,965	17,683				7,848	821				48,300
Cheadle	GTM	NW	Con	Con	30,484	55.0%	10,631	81.0%	30,484	5,037	19,853									55,374
Chelmsford	ESS	E	Con	Con	35,231	51.9%	7,761	82.2%	35,231	4,642	27,470					486				67,829
Chelsea	LND	LND	Con	Con	18,443	64.6%	13,319	57.7%	18,443	4,406	5,124					587				28,560
Cheltenham	GLS	SW	Con	Con	31,371	50.2%	4,896	78.9%	31,371	4,701	26,475									62,547
Chertsey and Walton	SRY	SE	Con	Con	32,119	59.5%	17,469	75.5%	32,119	7,185	14,650									53,954
Chesham and Amersham	BKS	SE	Con	Con	34,504	62.2%	19,440	77.4%	34,504	5,170	15,064					760				55,498
Chesterfield	DBY	EM	Lab	Lab	24,532	44.9%	8,577	76.7%	13,472	24,532	15,955									53,959
Chichester	WSX	SE	Con	Con	37,274	61.8%	20,177	74.4%	37,274	4,751	17,097					1,196				60,318
Chingford	LND	LND	Con	Con	27,110	62.2%	17,955	76.7%	27,110	6,650	9,155					634				43,549
Chipping Barnet	LND	LND	Con	Con	24,686	57.9%	14,871	70.0%	24,686	8,115	9,815									42,616
Chislehurst	LND	LND	Con	Con	24,165	57.6%	14,507	75.5%	24,165	8,115	9,658									41,938
Chorley	LAN	NW	Con	Con	29,015	48.0%	8,057	76.9%	29,015	20,958	9,706					714				60,393
Christchurch	HAM	SE	Con	Con	35,656	65.9%	22,374	76.3%	35,656	5,174	13,282									54,112
Cirencester and Tewkesbury	GLS	SW	Con	Con	36,272	55.4%	12,662	77.9%	36,272	5,342	23,610								283	65,507
City of Chester	CHS	NW	Con	Con	23,582	44.9%	4,855	79.8%	23,582	18,727	10,262									52,571
City of Durham	DUR	NE	Lab	Lab	23,382	44.9%	6,125	78.2%	11,408	23,382	17,257									52,047
City of London and Westminster South	LND	LND	Con	Con	19,333	57.8%	12,042	58.2%	19,333	6,821	7,291									33,445
Clackmannan	FLK	SCT	Lab	Lab	20,317	53.7%	12,401	77.0%	5,620	20,317	3,961	7,916								37,814
Clwyd North West	CLY	WLS	Con	Con	24,116	48.5%	11,781	75.2%	24,116	12,335	11,279				1,966					49,696
Clwyd South West	CLY	WLS	Con	Lab	16,701	35.4%	1,028	81.1%	15,673	16,701	10,778				3,987					47,139
Clydebank and Milngavie	EDB	SCT	Lab	Lab	22,528	56.9%	16,304	78.9%	6,224	22,528	5,891	4,935								39,578
Clydesdale	SLK	SCT	Lab	Lab	21,826	45.3%	10,502	78.2%	11,324	21,826	7,909	7,125								48,186
Colne Valley	WYK	YTH	Lib	Con	20,457	36.4%	1,677	80.1%	20,457	16,353	18,780					614				56,204
Congleton	CHS	NW	Con	Con	26,513	48.3%	7,969	80.5%	26,513	9,810	18,544									54,867
Conwy	CLY	WLS	Con	Con	15,730	38.7%	3,024	77.8%	15,730	9,049	12,706				3,177					40,662
Copeland	CMA	NW	Lab	Lab	20,999	47.2%	1,894	81.3%	19,105	20,999	4,052					319				44,475
Corby	NTH	EM	Con	Con	23,323	44.3%	1,805	79.6%	23,323	21,518	7,805									52,646
Cornwall North	CUL	SW	Con	Con	29,862	51.7%	5,682	79.8%	29,862	3,719	24,180									57,761
Coventry North East	WMD	WM	Lab	Lab	25,832	54.3%	11,867	70.5%	13,965	25,832	7,502								310	47,573
Coventry North West	WMD	WM	Lab	Lab	19,450	49.0%	5,663	74.8%	13,787	19,450	6,455									39,692
Coventry South East	WMD	WM	Lab	Lab	17,969	47.5%	6,653	73.0%	11,316	17,969	8,095					479				37,856
Coventry South West	WMD	WM	Con	Con	22,318	43.3%	3,210	78.7%	22,318	19,108	10,166									51,592
Crawley	WSX	SE	Con	Con	29,259	49.5%	12,138	77.1%	29,259	17,121	12,674									59,054
Crewe and Nantwich	CHS	NW	Lab	Lab	25,457	44.0%	1,092	77.1%	24,365	25,457	8,022									57,844
Crosby	MSY	NW	Con	Con	30,836	46.2%	6,847	79.6%	30,836	11,992	23,989									66,817
Croydon Central	LND	LND	Con	Con	22,133	56.6%	12,617	70.5%	22,133	9,516	7,435									39,084
Croydon North East	LND	LND	Con	Spkr	24,188	55.0%	12,519	69.7%		11,669	8,128								24,188	43,985
Croydon North West	LND	LND	Con	Con	18,665	47.0%	3,988	69.2%	18,665	14,677	6,363									39,705
Croydon South	LND	LND	Con	Con	30,732	64.1%	19,063	73.7%	30,732	4,679	11,669					900				47,980
Cumbernauld and Kilsyth	EDB	SCT	Lab	Lab	21,385	60.0%	14,403	78.5%	3,227	21,385	5,891	6,982								37,485
Cunninghame North	NAR	SCT	Con	Lab	19,061	44.4%	4,467	78.3%	14,594	19,061	5,185	4,076								42,916
Cunninghame South	NAR	SCT	Lab	Lab	22,728	60.8%	16,633	75.0%	6,095	22,728	4,426	4,115								37,364
Cynon Valley	MGM	WLS	Lab	Lab	26,222	68.9%	21,571	76.7%	4,638	26,222	4,651				2,549					38,060
Dagenham	LND	LND	Lab	Lab	18,454	44.4%	2,469	67.3%	15,985	18,454	7,088									41,527
Darlington	DUR	NE	Con	Con	24,831	46.6%	2,661	80.8%	24,831	22,170	6,289									53,290
Dartford	KNT	SE	Con	Con	30,685	53.5%	14,929	79.0%	30,685	15,756	10,439								491	57,371
Daventry	NTH	EM	Con	Con	31,353	57.9%	19,690	78.2%	31,353	11,097	11,663									54,113
Davyhulme	GTM	NW	Con	Con	23,633	46.6%	8,199	77.3%	23,633	15,434	11,637									50,704
Delyn	CLY	WLS	Con	Con	21,728	41.4%	1,224	82.6%	21,728	20,504	8,913				1,329					52,474
Denton and Reddish	GTM	NW	Lab	Lab	26,023	49.6%	8,250	75.8%	17,773	26,023	8,697									52,493
Derby North	DBY	EM	Con	Con	26,561	48.9%	6,325	75.8%	26,561	20,236	7,268					291				54,356
Derby South	DBY	EM	Lab	Lab	21,003	43.7%	1,516	69.9%	19,487	21,003	7,608									48,098
Devizes	WIL	SW	Con	Con	36,372	54.8%	17,830	77.2%	36,372	11,487	18,542									66,401
Dewsbury	WYK	YTH	Con	Lab	23,668	42.4%	445	78.8%	23,223	23,668	8,907									55,798
Doncaster Central	SYK	YTH	Lab	Lab	26,266	51.2%	8,196	73.7%	18,070	26,266	7,004									51,340
Doncaster North	SYK	YTH	Lab	Lab	32,950	61.8%	19,935	73.1%	13,015	32,950	7,394									53,359
Don Valley	SYK	YTH	Lab	Lab	29,200	53.1%	11,467	73.8%	17,733	29,200	8,027									54,960
Dorset North	DOR	SW	Con	Con	32,854	57.0%	11,907	79.1%	32,854	3,819	20,947									57,620
Dorset South	DOR	SW	Con	Con	30,184	54.8%	15,067	75.6%	30,184	9,494	15,117								244	55,039
Dorset West	DOR	SW	Con	Con	28,305	56.2%	12,364	78.3%	28,305	6,123	15,941									50,369
Dover	KNT	SE	Con	Con	25,343	46.0%	6,541	79.8%	25,343	18,802	10,942									55,087
Dudley East	WMD	WM	Lab	Lab	24,942	45.9%	3,473	72.3%	21,469	24,942	7,965									54,376
Dudley West	WMD	WM	Con	Con	32,224	49.8%	10,244	79.1%	32,224	21,980	10,477									64,681
Dulwich	LND	LND	Con	Con	16,563	42.4%	180	69.3%	16,563	16,383	5,664					432				39,042
Dumbarton	WDB	SCT	Lab	Lab	19,778	43.0%	5,222	77.9%	14,556	19,778	6,060	5,564								45,958
Dumfries	DFG	SCT	Con	Con	18,785	41.9%	7,493	75.6%	18,785	11,292	8,064	6,391				349				44,881
Dundee East	AGS	SCT	SNP	Lab	19,539	42.3%	1,015	75.9%	5,938	19,539	2,143	18,524								46,144
Dundee West	AGS	SCT	Lab	Lab	24,916	53.4%	16,526	75.4%	8,390	24,916	5,922	7,164							308	46,700
Dunfermline East	FIF	SCT	Lab	Lab	25,381	64.5%	19,589	76.6%	5,792	25,381	4,122	3,901								39,196
Dunfermline West	FIF	SCT	Lab	Lab	18,493	47.1%	9,402	76.9%	9,091	18,493	8,288	3,435								39,307
Durham North	DUR	NE	Lab	Lab	30,798	56.2%	18,433	75.9%	11,602	30,798	12,365									54,765
Ealing Acton	LND	LND	Con	Con	25,499	53.4%	12,243	71.0%	25,499	13,256	8,973									47,728
Ealing North	LND	LND	Con	Con	30,100	56.0%	15,153	75.1%	30,100	14,947	8,149					577				53,773
Ealing Southall	LND	LND	Lab	Lab	26,480	50.7%	7,977	69.7%	18,503	26,480	6,947								256	52,186
Easington	DUR	NE	Lab	Lab	32,396	68.1%	24,639	73.4%	7,757	32,396	7,447									47,600
East Antrim	NIR	NIR	UUP	UUP	23,942	71.6%	15,360	55.2%					23,942						9,518	33,460
East Berkshire	BRK	SE	Con	Con	39,094	60.3%	22,626	73.8%	39,094	9,287	16,468									64,846
East Kilbride	SLK	SCT	Lab	Lab	24,491	49.0%	12,624	79.2%	7,344	24,491	11,867	6,275								43,481
East Lindsey	LIN	EM	Con	Con	29,048	52.2%	8,616	75.2%	29,048	6,206	20,432									55,686
East Londonderry	NIR	NIR	UUP	UUP	29,532	60.5%	20,157	68.7%					29,532	9,375		281		5,464	4,172	48,824
East Lothian	ELO	SCT	Lab	Lab	24,583	48.0%	10,105	78.7%	14,378	24,583	7,929	3,727				451				51,068
East Surrey	SRY	SE	Con	Con	29,126	63.4%	18,126	77.2%	29,126	4,779	11,000					1,044				45,949
Eastbourne	SXE	SE	Con	Con	33,587	59.9%	16,923	75.6%	33,587	4,928	16,664					867				56,046
Eastleigh	HAM	SE	Con	Con	35,584	51.3%	13,355	79.3%	35,584	11,599	22,229									69,412
Eastwood	RFW	SCT	Con	Con	19,388	39.5%	6,014	79.4%	19,388	12,305	13,374	4,033								49,100
Eccles	GTM	NW	Lab	Lab	25,346	50.8%	9,699	74.5%	15,647	25,346	8,924									49,917
Eddisbury	CHS	NW	Con	Con	29,474	51.1%	15,835	78.0%	29,474	13,574	13,639					976				57,663
Edinburgh Central	EDB	SCT	Con	Lab	16,502	40.2%	2,262	69.0%	14,240	16,502	7,333	2,559				438				41,072
Edinburgh East	EDB	SCT	Lab	Lab	18,257	50.4%	9,295	74.1%	8,962	18,257	5,592	3,434								36,245
Edinburgh Leith	EDB	SCT	Lab	Lab	21,104	49.3%	11,327	70.9%	9,777	21,104	7,843	4,045								42,769
Edinburgh Pentlands	EDB	SCT	Con	Con	17,278	38.3%	3,745	77.7%	17,278	13,533	11,072	3,264								45,147
Edinburgh South	EDB	SCT	Con	Lab	18,211	37.7%	1,859	77.7%	16,352	18,211	10,900	2,455				440				48,358
Edinburgh West	EDB	SCT	Con	Con	18,450	37.4%	1,234	79.4%	18,450	10,957	17,216	2,774								49,397
Edmonton	LND	LND	Con	Con	24,556	51.2%	7,286	72.5%	24,556	17,270	6,115									47,941
Ellesmere Port and Neston	CHS	NW	Con	Con	25,664	44.4%	1,853	81.0%	25,664	23,811	8,143								185	57,803
Elmet	WYK	YTH	Con	Con	25,658	46.9%	5,356	79.3%	25,658	20,302	8,755									54,715
Eltham	LND	LND	Con	Con	19,752	47.5%	6,460	76.9%	19,752	13,292	8,542									41,586
Enfield North	LND	LND	Con	Con	28,758	55.5%	14,015	74.5%	28,758	14,743	7,633					644				51,778
Enfield Southgate	LND	LND	Con	Con	28,445	58.8%	18,345	72.6%	28,445	9,114	10,100					696				48,355
Epping Forest	ESS	E	Con	Con	31,536	60.9%	21,513	76.3%	31,536	9,499	10,023					695				51,753
Epsom and Ewell	SRY	SE	Con	Con	33,145	62.2%	20,761	75.4%	33,145	7,751	12,384									53,280
Erewash	SRY	SE	Con	Con	28,775	48.6%	9,754	77.4%	28,775	19,021	11,442									59,238
Erith and Crayford	KNT	SE	Con	Con	20,203	45.2%	6,994	75.4%	20,203	13,209	11,300									44,712
Esher	SRY	SE	Con	Con	31,334	65.5%	19,068	76.9%	31,334	4,197	12,266									47,797
Exeter	DEV	SW	Con	Con	26,922	44.4%	7,656	80.6%	26,922	13,643	19,266					597			209	60,637
Falkirk East	FLK	SCT	Lab	Lab	21,379	54.2%	14,023	75.0%	7,356	21,379	4,624	6,056								39,415
Falkirk West	FLK	SCT	Lab	Lab	20,256	52.6%	13,552	76.7%	6,704	20,256	4,841	6,696								38,497
Falmouth and Camborne	CUL	SW	Con	Con	23,725	43.9%	5,039	78.8%	23,725	11,271	18,686								373	54,055
Fareham	HAM	SE	Con	Con	36,781	61.1%	18,795	78.4%	36,781	5,451	17,986									60,218
Faversham	KNT	SE	Con	Con	31,074	51.1%	13,978	76.9%	31,074	12,616	17,096									60,788
Feltham and Heston	LND	LND	Con	Con	27,755	46.5%	5,430	73.7%	27,755	22,325	9,623									59,703
Fermanagh and South Tyrone	NIR	NIR	UUP	UUP	27,446	49.6%	12,823	80.3%					27,446	10,581				14,623	2,734	55,834
Finchley	LND	LND	Con	Con	21,603	53.9%	8,913	69.4%	21,603	12,690	5,580								190	40,063
Folkestone and Hythe	KNT	SE	Con	Con	27,915	55.4%	9,126	78.3%	27,915	3,720	18,789									50,424
Foyle	NIR	NIR	SDLP	SDLP	23,743	48.8%	9,860	69.0%						23,743			13,883	8,707	2,298	48,631
Fulham	LND	LND	Con	Con	21,752	51.8%	6,322	77.1%	21,752	15,430	4,365					465				42,012
Fylde	LAN	NW	Con	Con	29,559	60.7%	17,772	77.0%	29,559	6,955	11,787								405	48,706
Gainsborough and Horncastle	LIN	EM	Con	Con	28,621	53.3%	9,723	76.9%	28,621	6,156	18,898									53,675
Galloway and Upper Nithsdale	DAG	SCT	Con	Con	16,592	40.4%	3,673	76.8%	16,592	5,298	6,001	12,919							230	41,040
Gateshead East	TWR	NE	Lab	Lab	28,895	59.2%	17,228	71.8%	11,667	28,895	8,231									48,793
Gedling	NTT	EM	Con	Con	29,492	54.5%	16,539	79.1%	29,492	12,953	11,684									54,129
Gillingham	KNT	SE	Con	Con	28,711	53.1%	12,549	75.3%	28,711	9,230	16,162									54,100
Glanford and Scunthorpe	HUM	YTH	Con	Lab	24,733	43.5%	512	78.0%	24,221	24,733	7,762								104	56,820
Glasgow Cathcart	GSO	SCT	Lab	Lab	19,623	52.1%	11,203	76.4%	8,420	19,623	5,722	3,883								37,648
Glasgow Central	GSO	SCT	Lab	Lab	21,619	64.5%	17,253	65.6%	4,366	21,619	3,528	3,339				290			391	33,533
Glasgow Garscadden	GSO	SCT	Lab	Lab	23,178	67.7%	18,977	71.4%	3,660	23,178	3,211	4,201								34,250
Glasgow Govan	GSO	SCT	Lab	Lab	24,071	64.8%	19,509	73.4%	4,411	24,071	4,562	3,851							237	37,132
Glasgow Hillhead	GSO	SCT	SDP	Lab	17,958	42.9%	3,251	72.4%	6,048	17,958	14,707	2,713				443				41,869
Glasgow Maryhill	GSO	SCT	Lab	Lab	23,482	66.4%	19,364	67.5%	3,307	23,482	4,118	3,895				539				35,341
Glasgow Pollok	GSO	SCT	Lab	Lab	23,239	63.1%	17,983	71.7%	5,256	23,239	4,445	3,528				362				36,830
Glasgow Provan	GSO	SCT	Lab	Lab	22,032	72.9%	18,372	69.1%	2,336	22,032	2,189	3,660								30,217
Glasgow Rutherglen	GSO	SCT	Lab	Lab	24,790	56.0%	13,995	77.2%	5,088	24,790	10,795	3,584								44,257
Glasgow Shettleston	GSO	SCT	Lab	Lab	23,991	63.6%	18,981	70.4%	5,010	23,991	3,942	4,807								37,750
Glasgow Springburn	GSO	SCT	Lab	Lab	25,617	73.6%	22,063	67.5%	2,870	25,617	2,746	3,554								34,787
Gloucester	GLS	SW	Con	Con	29,826	49.7%	12,035	78.1%	29,826	17,791	12,417									60,034
Gordon	ADS	SCT	Lib	Lib	26,770	49.4%	9,519	73.7%	17,251	6,228	26,770	3,876								54,125
Gosport	HAM	SE	Con	Con	29,804	58.5%	13,723	74.8%	29,804	5,053	16,081									50,938
Gower	WGM	WLS	Lab	Lab	22,139	46.6%	5,765	80.7%	16,374	22,139	7,645				1,341					47,498
Grantham	LIN	EM	Con	Con	33,988	57.1%	21,303	75.0%	33,988	12,197	12,685					700				59,570
Gravesham	KNT	SE	Con	Con	28,891	50.1%	8,792	79.3%	28,891	20,099	8,724									57,714
Great Grimsby	HUM	EM	Lab	Lab	23,463	50.4%	8,784	74.7%	14,679	23,463	8,387									46,529
Great Yarmouth	NFK	E	Con	Con	25,336	51.7%	10,083	74.5%	25,336	15,253	8,387									48,976
Greenock and Port Glasgow	IVC	SCT	Lab	Lab	27,848	63.9%	20,055	75.4%	4,119	27,848	7,793	3,721								43,481
Greenwich	LND	LND	Lab	SDP	15,149	40.6%	2,141	73.4%	8,695	13,008	15,149					346			117	37,315
Guildford	SRY	SE	Con	Con	32,504	55.5%	12,607	75.3%	32,504	6,216	19,897									58,617
Hackney North and Stoke Newington	LND	LND	Lab	Lab	18,912	48.7%	7,678	58.1%	11,234	18,912	7,446					997			228	38,817
Hackney South and Shoreditch	LND	LND	Lab	Lab	18,799	47.9%	7,522	55.4%	11,277	18,799	8,812								403	32,291
Halesowen and Stourbridge	WMD	WM	Con	Con	31,037	50.1%	13,808	79.4%	31,037	17,229	13,658									61,924
Halifax	WYK	YTH	Con	Lab	24,741	43.4%	1,212	77.7%	23,529	24,741	8,758									57,028
Halton	CHS	NW	Lab	Lab	32,065	55.5%	14,578	78.3%	17,487	32,065	8,272									57,824
Hamilton	SLK	SCT	Lab	Lab	28,563	59.7%	21,662	76.9%	6,901	28,564	6,302	6,093								48,859
Hammersmith	LND	LND	Lab	Lab	15,811	45.0%	2,415	72.7%	13,396	15,811	5,241					453			223	35,124
Hampshire East	HAM	SE	Con	Con	43,093	64.5%	24,786	77.4%	43,093	4,443	19,307									66,843
Hampstead and Highgate	LND	LND	Con	Con	19,236	42.5%	2,221	71.5%	19,236	17,015	8,744								271	45,266
Harborough	LEI	EM	Con	Con	35,216	59.4%	18,810	79.3%	35,216	7,646	16,406									59,268
Harlow	ESS	E	Con	Con	26,017	47.2%	5,877	74.1%	26,017	20,140	8,915									55,072
Harrogate	NYK	YTH	Con	Con	31,167	55.5%	11,902	74.1%	31,167	5,671	19,265									56,103
Harrow East	LND	LND	Con	Con	32,302	54.2%	18,273	73.5%	32,302	14,029	13,251									59,582
Harrow West	LND	LND	Con	Con	30,456	55.2%	15,444	74.5%	30,456	9,665	15,012									55,133
Hartlepool	CLV	NE	Lab	Lab	24,296	48.5%	7,289	73.0%	17,007	24,296	7,047								1,786	50,136
Harwich	ESS	E	Con	Con	26,163	50.1%	7,347	71.8%	26,163	6,825	18,816								436	52,240
Hastings and Rye	SXE	SE	Con	Con	29,344	51.8%	12,082	73.5%	29,344	9,920	17,262								161	56,687
Havant	HAM	SE	Con	Con	32,527	51.8%	16,510	73.5%	32,527	8,030	16,017								373	56,687
Hayes and Harlington	LND	LND	Con	Con	21,355	49.2%	5,965	74.5%	21,355	15,390	6,641									43,386
Hazel Grove	GTM	NW	Con	Con	24,396	45.5%	1,840	81.6%	24,396	6,354	22,556									53,652
Hemsworth	WYK	YTH	Lab	Lab	27,859	67.0%	20,700	75.7%	7,159	27,859	6,568									41,586
Hendon North	LND	LND	Con	Con	20,155	55.6%	10,932	65.8%	20,155	9,223	6,859									36,237
Hendon South	LND	LND	Con	Con	19,341	55.5%	11,124	63.8%	19,341	7,261	8,217									34,820
Henley	OXF	SE	Con	Con	29,978	61.1%	17,082	75.0%	29,978	6,173	12,896									49,047
Hereford	HWR	WM	Con	Con	24,865	47.5%	1,413	78.0%	24,865	4,031	23,452									52,348
Hertford and Stortford	HRT	E	Con	Con	33,763	57.5%	17,140	77.7%	33,763	7,494	16,623					814				58,694
Hertsmere	HRT	E	Con	Con	31,278	56.6%	18,106	75.4%	31,278	10,835	13,172									55,285
Hexham	NBL	NE	Con	Con	22,370	49.6%	8,066	80.0%	22,370	8,103	14,304					336				45,113
Heywood and Middleton	GTM	NW	Lab	Lab	21,900	49.9%	6,848	73.8%	15,052	21,900	6,953									43,905
High Peak	DBY	EM	Con	Con	25,715	45.7%	9,516	80.5%	25,715	16,199	14,389									56,303
Holborn and St Pancras South	LND	LND	Lab	Lab	22,966	50.6%	8,853	64.3%	14,113	22,966	7,994								300	45,373
Holland with Boston	LIN	EM	Con	Con	27,412	57.8%	17,595	72.2%	27,412	9,734	9,817								405	65,539
Honiton	DEV	SW	Con	Con	34,931	59.2%	16,562	76.4%	34,931	4,988	18,369								747	59,035
Hornchurch	LND	LND	Con	Con	24,039	51.2%	10,694	75.3%	24,039	13,345	9,609									44,712
Hornsey and Wood Green	LND	LND	Con	Con	25,397	43.0%	1,779	73.3%	25,397	23,618	8,928					1,154				59,097
Horsham	WSX	SE	Con	Con	39,775	63.7%	23,907	72.5%	39,775	5,435	15,868					1,383				62,461
Houghton and Washington	TWR	NE	Lab	Lab	32,805	59.1%	20,193	71.3%	12,612	32,805	10,090									55,507
Hove	WSE	SE	Con	Con	28,952	58.8%	18,218	67.8%	28,952	9,010	10,734								522	49,218
Huddersfield	WYK	EM	Lab	Lab	23,019	45.9%	7,278	75.5%	15,741	23,019	10,773					638				50,171
Huntingdon	CAM	E	Con	Con	40,530	63.6%	27,044	74.0%	40,530	8,883	13,486					874				63,773
Hyndburn	LAN	NW	Con	Con	21,606	44.4%	2,220	80.5%	21,606	19,386	7,423					297				48,712
Ilford North	LND	LND	Con	Con	24,110	54.9%	12,090	72.6%	24,110	12,020	7,757									43,887
Ilford South	LND	LND	Con	Con	20,351	48.4%	4,572	71.8%	20,351	15,779	5,928									42,058
Inverness, Nairn and Lochaber	HLD	SCT	Lib	Lib	17,422	36.8%	5,431	70.9%	10,901	11,991	17,422	7,001								47,315
Ipswich	SFK	E	Lab	Con	23,328	44.4%	874	77.1%	23,328	22,454	6,596								174	52,552
Isle of Wight	IOW	SE	Lib	Con	40,175	51.2%	6,442	79.6%	40,175	4,626	33,733									78,560
Islington North	LND	LND	Lab	Lab	19,577	50.0%	9,657	66.5%	9,920	19,577	8,560					1,131				39,188
Islington South and Finsbury	LND	LND	Lab	Lab	16,511	40.1%	805	71.2%	8,482	16,511	15,706					382			137	41,218
Islwyn	GNT	WLS	Lab	Lab	28,901	71.3%	22,947	80.4%	5,954	28,901	3,746				1,932					40,533
Jarrow	TWR	NE	Lab	Lab	29,651	63.4%	18,795	74.4%	10,856	29,651	6,230									46,737
Keighley	WYK	YTH	Con	Con	23,903	45.8%	5,606	79.4%	23,903	18,297	10,041									52,243
Kensington	LND	LND	Con	Con	14,818	47.5%	4,447	64.7%	14,818	10,371	5,379					528			95	31,191
Kettering	NTH	EM	Con	Con	26,532	51.0%	11,327	78.8%	26,532	10,229	15,205									51,196
Kilmarnock and Loudoun	EAR	SCT	Lab	Lab	23,713	48.5%	11,327	78.0%	9,586	23,713	6,698	8,881								48,878
Kincardine and Deeside	ADS	SCT	Con	Con	19,438	40.7%	2,063	75.2%	19,438	7,624	17,375	3,082				299				47,818
Kingston upon Hull East	HUM	YTH	Lab	Lab	27,287	56.3%	14,689	70.6%	12,598	27,287	8,572									48,457
Kingston upon Hull North	HUM	YTH	Lab	Lab	26,123	51.2%	12,169	69.6%	13,954	26,123	10,962									51,039
Kingston upon Hull West	HUM	YTH	Lab	Lab	19,527	51.9%	8,130	67.6%	11,397	19,527	6,669									37,593
Kingston upon Thames	LND	LND	Con	Con	24,198	56.2%	11,186	78.5%	24,198	5,676	13,012								175	43,061
Kingswood	AVN	SW	Con	Con	26,300	44.9%	4,393	80.2%	26,300	21,907	10,382									58,589
Kirkcaldy	FIF	SCT	Lab	Lab	20,281	49.6%	11,570	76.5%	8,711	20,281	7,118	4,794								53,439
Knowsley North	MSY	NW	Lab	Lab	27,454	69.9%	21,098	74.2%	4,922	27,454	6,356								538	39,270
Knowsley South	MSY	NW	Lab	Lab	31,378	64.5%	20,846	74.1%	10,532	31,378	6,760									48,670
Lagan Valley	NIR	NIR	UUP	UUP	29,101	70.0%	23,373	64.4%					29,101	2,888				2,656	6,943	41,588
Lancaster	LAN	NW	Con	Con	21,142	46.7%	6,453	79.2%	21,142	14,689	9,003					473				45,307
Langbaurgh	CLV	NE	Con	Con	26,047	41.7%	2,088	78.8%	26,047	23,959	12,405									62,411
Leeds Central	WYK	YTH	Lab	Lab	21,270	55.6%	11,505	64.8%	9,765	21,270	6,853								355	59,019
Leeds East	WYK	YTH	Lab	Lab	20,932	48.7%	9,526	70.2%	11,406	20,932	10,630									42,968
Leeds North East	WYK	YTH	Con	Con	22,196	45.6%	8,419	75.3%	22,196	12,292	13,777					416				48,681
Leeds North West	WYK	YTH	Con	Con	22,480	43.5%	5,201	75.7%	22,480	11,210	17,279					663				51,632
Leeds West	WYK	YTH	Lib	Lab	21,032	43.2%	4,692	73.3%	11,276	21,032	16,340									48,648
Leicester East	LEI	EM	Con	Lab	24,074	46.2%	1,924	73.3%	22,150	24,074	5,935									52,159
Leicester South	LEI	EM	Con	Lab	24,901	44.2%	1,877	77.0%	23,024	24,901	7,773					390			288	56,376
Leicester West	LEI	EM	Lab	Lab	22,156	44.5%	1,201	73.5%	20,955	22,156	6,708									49,819
Leigh	GTM	SW	Lab	Lab	30,064	58.6%	16,606	74.1%	13,458	30,064	7,743									51,265
Leominster	HWR	WM	Con	Con	31,396	57.9%	14,075	77.5%	31,396	4,444	17,321					1,102				54,263
Lewes	SXE	SE	Con	Con	32,016	56.8%	13,620	77.0%	32,016	4,973	18,396					970				56,355
Lewisham Deptford	LND	LND	Lab	Lab	18,724	50.3%	6,771	64.9%	11,953	18,724	6,513									37,190
Lewisham East	LND	LND	Con	Con	19,873	45.1%	4,814	73.9%	19,873	15,059	9,118									44,052
Lewisham West	LND	LND	Con	Con	20,995	46.2%	3,772	72.2%	20,995	17,223	7,247									45,465
Leyton	LND	LND	Lab	Lab	16,536	41.2%	4,641	69.6%	11,692	16,536	11,895									40,123
Lincoln	LIN	EM	Con	Con	27,097	46.5%	7,483	75.6%	27,097	19,614	11,319								232	58,262
Linlithgow	WLO	SCT	Lab	Lab	21,869	47.4%	10,373	77.6%	6,828	21,869	5,840	11,496							154	46,187
Littleborough and Saddleworth	GTM	NW	Con	Con	22,027	43.1%	6,202	77.4%	22,027	13,299	15,825									51,151
Liverpool Broadgreen	MSY	NW	Lab	Lab	23,262	48.6%	6,047	75.9%	7,413	23,262	17,215									47,890
Liverpool Garston	MSY	NW	Lab	Lab	24,848	53.6%	13,777	75.7%	11,071	24,848	10,370								98	46,387
Liverpool Mossley Hill	MSY	NW	Lib	Lib	20,012	43.7%	2,226	75.1%	8,005	17,786	20,012									45,803
Liverpool Riverside	MSY	NW	Lab	Lab	25,505	73.2%	20,689	65.3%	4,816	25,505	3,912								601	34,834
Liverpool Walton	MSY	NW	Lab	Lab	34,661	64.4%	23,253	73.6%	7,738	34,661	11,408									53,807
Liverpool West Derby	MSY	NW	Lab	Lab	29,021	65.3%	20,496	73.4%	8,525	29,021	6,897									44,443
Livingston	WLO	SCT	Lab	Lab	19,110	45.6%	11,105	74.1%	7,860	19,110	8,005	6,969								41,944
Llanelli	DFD	WLS	Lab	Lab	29,506	59.2%	20,935	78.1%	8,571	29,506	6,714				5,088					49,879
Loughborough	LEI	EM	Con	Con	31,931	54.7%	17,648	79.2%	31,931	14,283	11,499					656				58,369
Ludlow	SPS	WM	Con	Con	27,499	53.9%	11,699	77.1%	27,499	7,724	15,800									51,023
Luton North	BDF	E	Con	Con	30,997	53.8%	15,573	77.6%	30,997	15,424	11,166									57,587
Luton South	BDF	E	Con	Con	24,762	46.2%	5,115	75.2%	24,762	19,647	9,146									53,555
Macclesfield	CHS	NW	Con	Con	33,208	56.4%	19,092	77.4%	33,208	11,563	14,116									58,887
Maidstone	KNT	SE	Con	Con	29,100	52.4%	10,364	76.0%	29,100	6,935	18,736					717				55,488
Makerfield	GTM	NW	Lab	Lab	30,190	56.3%	15,558	75.8%	14,632	30,190	8,838									53,660
Manchester Blackley	GTM	NW	Lab	Lab	22,476	52.4%	10,122	72.9%	12,354	22,476	8,041									42,871
Manchester Central	GTM	NW	Lab	Lab	27,428	68.2%	19,867	63.9%	7,561	27,428	5,250									40,239
Manchester Gorton	GTM	NW	Lab	Lab	24,615	54.4%	14,065	70.4%	10,550	24,615	9,830								253	45,248
Manchester Withington	GTM	NW	Lab	Lab	21,650	42.9%	3,391	77.1%	18,259	21,650	9,978					524				50,411
Manchester Wythenshawe	GTM	NW	Lab	Lab	23,881	56.8%	11,855	72.1%	12,026	23,881	5,921								216	42,044
Mansfield	NTT	EM	Lab	Lab	19,610	37.5%	56	78.4%	19,554	19,610	11,604								1,580	52,348
Medway	KNT	SE	Con	Con	23,889	51.0%	9,929	73.0%	23,889	13,960	8,450					504				46,803
Meirionnydd Nant Conwy	CLY	WLS	PC	PC	10,392	40.0%	3,026	80.6%	7,366	4,397	3,814				10,392					25,969
Meriden	WMD	WM	Con	Con	31,935	55.1%	16,820	73.9%	31,935	15,115	10,896									57,946
Merthyr Tydfil and Rhymney	GNT	WLS	Lab	Lab	33,477	75.3%	28,130	76.2%	5,270	33,477	3,573				2,085					44,405
Mid Bedfordshire	BDF	SE	Con	Con	37,411	59.0%	22,851	78.6%	37,411	11,463	14,560									63,434
Mid Kent	KNT	SE	Con	Con	28,719	55.1%	14,768	71.9%	28,719	9,420	13,951									52,090
Mid Norfolk	NFK	E	Con	Con	32,758	56.7%	18,008	78.2%	32,758	10,272	14,750									57,600
Mid Staffordshire	STS	WM	Con	Con	28,644	50.6%	14,654	79.4%	28,644	13,990	13,114								836	56,584
Mid Sussex	WSX	SE	Con	Con	37,781	61.1%	18,292	77.2%	37,781	4,573	19,489									61,843
Mid Ulster	NIR	NIR	DUP	DUP	23,004	44.2%	9,360	77.4%						13,644			23,004	12,449	2,979	52,076
Mid Worcestershire	WOR	WM	Con	Con	31,854	51.6%	14,911	76.6%	31,854	16,943	12,954									61,751
Middlesbrough	CLV	NE	Lab	Lab	25,747	59.7%	14,958	71.0%	10,789	25,747	6,594									43,130
Midlothian	MLO	SCT	Lab	Lab	22,553	48.3%	12,223	76.9%	8,527	22,553	10,330	4,947				412				45,291
Milton Keynes	BKM	SE	Con	Con	35,396	47.8%	13,701	76.3%	35,396	16,111	21,695					810				74,012
Mitcham and Morden	LND	LND	Con	Con	23,002	48.2%	6,183	75.7%	23,002	16,819	7,930									47,751
Mole Valley	SRY	SE	Con	Con	31,689	60.8%	16,076	77.0%	31,689	4,846	15,613									52,148
Monklands East	NLK	SCT	Lab	Lab	22,649	61.0%	16,389	74.8%	6,260	22,649	3,442	4,790								37,141
Monklands West	NLK	SCT	Lab	Lab	24,449	62.3%	18,333	77.3%	6,166	24,449	4,408	4,260								39,333
Monmouth	GNT	WLS	Con	Con	22,387	47.5%	9,530	80.8%	22,387	13,037	11,313				363					47,100
Montgomery	POW	WLS	Lib	Lib	14,729	46.6%	2,558	79.4%	12,171	3,304	14,729				1,412					31,616
Moray	MOR	SCT	Con	SNP	19,510	43.2%	3,685	72.6%	15,825	5,118	4,724	19,510								45,177
Morecambe and Lunesdale	LAN	NW	Con	Con	22,327	52.7%	11,785	76.1%	22,327	9,535	10,542									42,404
Morley and Leeds South	WYK	YTH	Lab	Lab	21,551	49.5%	6,711	71.6%	14,840	21,551	7,099									43,490
Motherwell North	NLK	SCT	Lab	Lab	29,825	66.9%	23,595	77.3%	4,939	29,825	3,558	6,230								44,552
Motherwell South	NLK	SCT	Lab	Lab	22,957	58.3%	16,930	75.5%	5,702	22,957	4,463	6,027							223	39,372
Neath	WGM	WLS	Lab	Lab	27,612	63.4%	20,578	78.8%	7,034	27,612	6,132				2,792					43,570
New Forest	HAM	SE	Con	Con	37,188	64.7%	21,732	76.6%	37,188	4,856	15,456									57,500
Newark	NTT	E	Con	Con	28,070	53.5%	13,543	77.6%	28,070	14,527	9,833									52,430
Newbury	BRK	SE	Con	Con	35,266	60.1%	16,658	78.0%	35,266	4,765	18,608									58,639
Newcastle upon Tyne Central	TWR	NE	Con	Lab	20,416	44.2%	2,483	75.5%	17,933	20,416	7,304					418			111	46,182
Newcastle upon Tyne East	TWR	NE	Lab	Lab	23,677	56.5%	12,500	70.6%	11,177	23,677	6,728								362	41,944
Newcastle upon Tyne North	TWR	NE	Lab	Lab	22,424	42.7%	5,243	75.9%	12,915	22,424	17,181									52,520
Newcastle-under-Lyme	STS	WM	Lab	Lab	21,618	40.5%	5,132	80.8%	14,863	21,618	16,486								397	53,364
Newham North East	LND	LND	Lab	Lab	20,220	51.9%	8,236	64.1%	11,984	20,220	6,772									38,976
Newham North West	LND	LND	Lab	Lab	15,677	55.4%	8,496	59.4%	7,181	15,677	4,920					497				28,275
Newham South	LND	LND	Lab	Lab	12,935	43.5%	2,766	59.1%	10,169	12,935	6,607									29,711
Newport East	GWT	WLS	Lab	Lab	20,518	49.1%	7,064	79.9%	13,454	20,518	7,383				458					41,813
Newport West	GWT	WLS	Con	Lab	20,887	46.1%	2,708	81.8%	18,179	20,887	5,903				377					45,346
Newry and Armagh	NIR	NIR	UUP	SDLP	25,137	48.1%	5,325	79.2%					19,812	25,137				6,173	1,146	52,268
Normanton	WYK	YTH	Lab	Lab	23,303	49.5%	7,287	79.9%	16,016	23,303	7,717									47,036
North Antrim	NIR	NIR	DUP	DUP	28,283	68.7%	23,234	62.8%						5,149			28,283	2,633	5,140	41,205
North Bedfordshire	BDF	E	Con	Con	29,845	52.6%	16,505	77.2%	29,845	13,140	13,340								435	56,760
North Colchester	ESS	E	Con	Con	32,747	52.3%	13,623	76.0%	32,747	10,768	19,124									62,639
North Devon	DEV	SW	Con	Con	28,071	50.9%	4,469	81.7%	28,071	3,467	23,602									55,140
North Down	NIR	NIR	UPUP	UPUP	18,420	45.1%	3,953	62.8%											40,819	40,819
North East Cambridgeshire	CAM	E	Lib	Con	26,983	47.0%	1,428	77.4%	26,983	4,891	25,555									57,429
North East Derbyshire	DBY	EM	Lab	Lab	24,747	44.4%	3,720	79.3%	21,027	24,747	9,985									55,759
North East Fife	FIF	SCT	Con	Lib	17,868	44.8%	1,447	76.2%	16,421	2,947	17,868	2,616								39,852
North Hertfordshire	HRT	E	Con	Con	31,750	49.7%	11,442	81.1%	31,750	11,782	20,308									63,840
North Norfolk	NFK	E	Con	Con	28,822	53.3%	15,310	77.5%	28,822	10,765	13,512					960				54,059
North Tayside	AGS	SCT	Con	Con	18,307	45.4%	5,016	74.7%	18,307	3,550	5,201	13,291								40,349
North Thanet	KNT	SE	Con	Con	29,225	58.0%	17,480	72.2%	29,225	8,395	11,745					996				50,361
North Warwickshire	WAR	WM	Con	Con	25,453	45.1%	2,829	79.9%	25,453	22,624	8,382									56,459
Durham West North	DUR	NE	Lab	Lab	22,947	50.9%	10,162	73.5%	12,785	22,947	9,349									45,081
North West Hampshire	HAM	SE	Con	Con	31,470	57.8%	13,437	77.9%	31,470	4,980	18,033									54,483
North West Leicestershire	LEI	EM	Con	Con	27,872	47.6%	7,828	82.9%	27,872	20,044	10,034					570				58,520
North West Norfolk	NFK	E	Con	Con	29,393	50.6%	10,825	78.9%	29,393	10,184	18,568									58,145
North West Surrey	SRY	SE	Con	Con	38,535	64.0%	23,575	72.5%	38,535	6,751	14,960									60,246
North Wiltshire	WIL	SW	Con	Con	35,309	55.1%	10,939	79.3%	35,309	4,343	24,370									64,022
Northampton North	NTH	EM	Con	Con	24,816	47.8%	9,256	74.6%	24,816	15,560	10,960					471			156	51,963
Northampton South	NTH	EM	Con	Con	31,864	55.7%	17,803	75.2%	31,864	14,061	10,639					647				57,211
Northavon	AVN	SW	Con	Con	34,244	54.4%	14,270	80.2%	34,244	8,762	19,954									62,960
Norwich North	NFK	E	Con	Con	22,772	45.8%	7,776	79.2%	22,772	14,996	11,922									49,690
Norwich South	NFK	E	Con	Lab	19,666	37.9%	336	80.6%	19,330	19,666	12,896									51,892
Norwood	LND	LND	Lab	Lab	18,359	48.4%	4,723	67.0%	13,636	18,359	5,579								322	56,602
Nottingham East	NTT	EM	Con	Con	20,162	42.9%	456	68.8%	20,162	19,706	6,887								212	46,967
Nottingham North	NTT	EM	Con	Lab	22,713	44.9%	1,665	72.6%	21,048	22,713	5,912								879	69,620
Nottingham South	NTT	EM	Con	Con	23,921	45.0%	2,234	73.0%	23,921	21,687	7,517									53,125
Nuneaton	WAR	WM	Con	Con	24,630	44.9%	5,655	80.3%	24,630	18,975	10,550					719				54,874
Ogmore	MGM	WLS	Lab	Lab	28,462	69.4%	22,292	80.1%	6,170	28,462	3,954				1,791				652	41,029
Old Bexley and Sidcup	LND	LND	Con	Con	24,350	62.1%	16,274	77.1%	24,350	6,762	8,076									39,188
Oldham Central and Royton	GTM	NW	Lab	Lab	21,759	48.1%	6,279	69.2%	15,480	21,759	7,956									45,195
Oldham West	GTM	NW	Lab	Lab	20,291	49.4%	5,967	71.9%	14,324	20,291	6,478									41,093
Orkney and Shetland	HLD	SCT	Lib	Lib	8,881	41.7%	3,922	68.7%	4,959	3,995	8,881					389			3,095	21,319
Orpington	LND	LND	Con	Con	27,261	58.2%	12,732	78.5%	27,261	5,020	14,529									46,810
Oxford East	OXF	SE	Con	Lab	21,103	43.0%	1,288	78.9%	19,815	21,103	7,648					441			60	49,067
Oxford West and Abingdon	OXF	SE	Con	Con	25,171	46.4%	4,878	78.4%	25,171	8,108	20,293					695				54,267
Paisley North	RFW	SCT	Lab	Lab	20,193	55.5%	14,442	73.5%	5,751	20,193	5,741	4,696								36,381
Paisley South	RFW	SCT	Lab	Lab	21,611	56.2%	15,785	75.3%	5,644	21,611	5,826	5,398								38,479
Peckham	LND	LND	Lab	Lab	17,965	54.5%	9,489	55.6%	8,476	17,965	5,878					628				32,947
Pembrokeshire	DFD	WLS	Con	Con	23,314	41.0%	5,700	80.8%	23,314	17,614	14,832				1,119					56,879
Pendle	LAN	NW	Con	Con	21,009	40.4%	2,639	81.8%	21,009	18,370	12,662									52,041
Penrith and The Border	CMA	NW	Con	Con	33,148	60.3%	17,366	77.5%	33,148	6,075	15,782									55,005
Perth and Kinross	PAK	SCT	Con	Con	18,716	39.6%	5,676	74.4%	18,716	7,490	7,969	13,040								47,215
Peterborough	CAM	E	Con	Con	30,624	49.4%	9,784	73.5%	30,624	20,840	9,984					506				61,951
Plymouth Devonport	DEV	SW	SDP	SDP	21,039	42.3%	6,470	77.2%	14,569	14,166	21,039									49,774
Plymouth Drake	DEV	SW	Con	Con	16,195	41.3%	3,125	76.6%	16,195	9,451	13,070					493				39,209
Plymouth Sutton	DEV	SW	Con	Con	23,187	45.8%	4,013	79.0%	23,187	8,310	19,174									50,674
Pontefract and Castleford	WYK	YTH	Lab	Lab	31,656	66.9%	21,626	73.5%	10,051	31,656	5,334								295	47,315
Pontypridd	GNT	WLS	Lab	Lab	26,422	56.3%	17,277	76.6%	9,145	26,422	8,865				2,498					46,930
Poole	DOR	SW	Con	Con	34,159	57.5%	14,808	77.5%	34,159	5,901	19,351									59,411
Portsmouth North	HAM	SE	Con	Con	33,297	55.3%	18,401	74.8%	33,297	12,016	14,896									60,209
Portsmouth South	HAM	SE	Con	Con	23,534	43.3%	205	71.3%	23,534	7,047	23,329								455	54,365
Preston	LAN	NW	Lab	Lab	23,341	52.5%	10,645	71.0%	12,696	23,341	8,452								295	44,489
Pudsey	WYK	YTH	Con	Con	25,457	45.5%	6,436	78.0%	25,457	11,461	19,021									55,939
Putney	LND	LND	Con	Con	24,197	50.5%	6,436	76.0%	24,197	17,290	5,934					508				47,929
Ravensbourne	LND	LND	Con	Con	28,295	63.0%	16,919	75.7%	28,295	5,087	11,376								184	44,939
Reading East	BRK	SE	Con	Con	28,515	53.8%	16,217	73.3%	28,515	11,371	12,298					667			125	52,976
Reading West	BRK	SE	Con	Con	28,122	55.3%	16,753	72.2%	28,122	10,819	11,369					542				50,852
Redcar	CLV	NE	Lab	Lab	22,824	47.3%	7,735	76.1%	15,089	22,824	10,298									48,211
Reigate	SRY	SE	Con	Con	30,925	59.3%	18,173	72.5%	30,925	7,460	12,752					1,026				52,163
Renfrew West and Inverclyde	RFW	SCT	Con	Lab	17,525	38.7%	4,053	80.5%	13,472	17,525	9,669	4,578								45,244
Rhondda	MGM	WLS	Lab	Lab	35,015	73.4%	30,754	78.3%	3,611	35,015	3,930				4,261				869	47,686
Ribble Valley	LAN	NW	Con	Con	30,136	60.9%	19,528	79.1%	30,136	8,781	10,608									49,525
Richmond and Barnes	LND	LND	Con	Con	21,729	47.7%	1,766	83.2%	21,729	3,227	19,963					610				44,919
Richmond (Yorks)	NYK	YTH	Con	Con	34,995	61.2%	19,576	72.1%	34,995	6,737	15,419									57,151
Rochdale	GTM	NW	Lib	Lib	22,245	43.4%	2,779	74.6%	9,561	19,466	22,245									51,272
Rochford	ESS	E	Con	Con	35,872	60.4%	19,694	78.0%	35,872	7,308	16,178									59,358
Romford	LND	LND	Con	Con	22,745	56.0%	13,471	72.9%	22,745	9,274	8,195					385				40,599
Romsey and Waterside	HAM	SE	Con	Con	35,303	56.4%	15,272	79.0%	35,303	7,213	20,031									62,547
Ross, Cromarty and Skye	HLD	SCT	SDP	SDP	18,809	49.4%	11,319	72.7%	7,490	7,287	18,809	4,492								38,078
Rossendale and Darwen	LAN	NW	Con	Con	28,056	46.6%	4,982	80.3%	28,056	23,074	9,097									60,227
Rother Valley	SYK	YTH	Lab	Lab	28,292	56.4%	15,790	75.6%	12,502	28,292	9,240								145	50,179
Rotherham	SYK	YTH	Lab	Lab	25,422	59.7%	16,012	69.2%	9,410	25,422	7,766									42,598
Roxburgh and Berwickshire	STB	SCT	Lib	Lib	16,388	49.2%	4,008	77.2%	12,380	2,944	16,388	1,586								33,298
Rugby and Kenilworth	WAR	WM	Con	Con	31,485	51.6%	16,264	79.6%	31,485	15,221	14,343									61,409
Ruislip-Northwood	LND	LND	Con	Con	27,418	62.6%	16,971	77.7%	27,418	5,913	10,447									43,778
Rushcliffe	NTT	EM	Con	Con	34,214	58.8%	20,839	80.0%	34,214	9,631	13,375					991				72,797
Rutland and Melton	LIN	EM	Con	Con	37,073	62.0%	23,022	76.8%	37,073	8,680	14,051									59,804
Ryedale	NYK	YTH	Con	Con	35,149	53.3%	9,740	79.2%	35,149	5,340	25,409									65,988
Saffron Walden	ESS	E	Con	Con	33,354	57.7%	16,602	79.0%	33,354	6,674	16,752					816			217	57,813
Salford East	GTM	NW	Lab	Lab	22,555	58.8%	12,056	66.0%	10,499	22,555	5,105								201	38,360
Salisbury	WIL	SW	Con	Con	31,612	54.9%	11,443	75.6%	31,612	5,455	20,169								372	57,608
Scarborough	NYK	YTH	Con	Con	27,672	50.7%	13,626	73.2%	27,672	12,913	14,046									54,631
Sedgefield	DUR	NE	Lab	Lab	25,965	56.0%	13,058	76.2%	12,907	25,965	7,477									46,349
Selby	NYK	YTH	Con	Con	28,611	51.6%	13,779	77.7%	28,611	14,832	12,010									55,453
Sevenoaks	KNT	SE	Con	Con	32,945	58.9%	17,345	76.4%	32,945	7,379	15,600									55,923
Sheffield Attercliffe	SYK	YTH	Lab	Lab	28,266	57.8%	17,191	72.9%	11,975	28,266	9,549									49,790
Sheffield Brightside	SYK	YTH	Lab	Lab	31,208	69.9%	24,191	68.7%	7,017	31,208	6,434									44,659
Sheffield Central	SYK	YTH	Lab	Lab	25,872	67.7%	19,342	62.5%	6,530	25,872	5,314								481	38,197
Sheffield Hallam	SYK	YTH	Con	Con	25,649	46.3%	7,637	74.7%	25,649	11,290	18,012					459				55,410
Sheffield Helley	SYK	YTH	Lab	Lab	28,425	53.4%	14,440	72.0%	13,985	28,425	10,811									53,221
Sheffield Hillsborough	SYK	YTH	Lab	Lab	26,208	44.0%	3,286	78.0%	10,396	26,208	22,922									59,526
Sherwood	NTT	EM	Con	Con	26,816	45.9%	4,495	81.9%	26,816	22,321	9,343									58,480
Shipley	WYK	YTH	Con	Con	26,941	49.5%	12,630	79.2%	26,941	12,699	14,311					507				54,428
Shoreham	WSX	SE	Con	Con	33,660	60.9%	17,070	77.5%	33,660	5,053	16,590									55,303
Shrewsbury and Atcham	SPS	WM	Con	Con	26,027	47.8%	9,064	77.0%	26,027	10,797	16,963					660				54,447
Shropshire North	SPS	WM	Con	Con	30,385	52.2%	14,415	75.5%	30,385	11,866	15,970									58,221
Skipton and Ripon	NYK	YTH	Con	Con	33,128	59.0%	17,174	77.8%	33,128	6,264	15,954					825				56,171
Slough	BRK	SE	Con	Con	26,166	47.0%	4,090	75.9%	26,166	22,076	7,490									55,732
Solihull	WMD	WM	Con	Con	35,844	61.1%	21,786	75.1%	35,844	8,791	14,058									58,693
Somerton and Frome	SOM	SW	Con	Con	29,351	53.7%	9,538	79.4%	29,351	5,461	19,813									54,625
South Antrim	NIR	NIR	UUP	UUP	25,395	69.8%	19,587	62.9%					25,395	3,611				1,592	5,808	36,406
South Colchester and Maldon	ESS	E	Con	Con	34,894	54.9%	15,483	76.2%	34,894	9,229	19,411									63,534
South Derbyshire	DBY	EM	Con	Con	31,927	49.1%	10,311	81.3%	31,927	21,616	11,509									65,052
South Down	NIR	NIR	UUP	SDLP	26,579	47.0%	731	79.4%					25,848	26,579				2,363	1,744	56,534
South East Cambridgeshire	CAM	E	Con	Con	32,901	58.8%	17,502	77.4%	32,901	7,694	15,399									55,994
South East Cornwall	CUL	SW	Con	Con	28,818	51.6%	6,607	79.5%	28,818	4,847	22,211									55,876
South Hams	DEV	SW	Con	Con	34,218	55.4%	13,146	78.6%	34,218	5,060	21,072					1,178			277	61,805
South Norfolk	NFK	E	Con	Con	33,912	53.4%	12,418	81.0%	33,912	8,047	21,494									63,453
South Ribble	LAN	NW	Con	Con	28,133	47.2%	8,430	82.5%	28,133	19,703	11,746									59,582
South Shields	TWR	NE	Lab	Lab	24,882	57.9%	13,851	70.7%	11,031	24,882	6,654								408	42,975
South Staffordshire	STS	WM	Con	Con	37,708	60.9%	25,268	78.2%	37,708	11,805	12,440									61,953
South Suffolk	SFK	E	Con	Con	33,972	53.4%	16,243	77.6%	33,972	11,876	17,729									63,577
South Thanet	KNT	SE	Con	Con	25,135	54.3%	13,683	73.7%	25,135	9,673	11,452									46,260
South West Bedfordshire	BDF	E	Con	Con	36,140	58.2%	22,305	78.7%	36,140	11,352	13,835					822				62,149
South West Cambridgeshire	CAM	E	Con	Con	36,622	57.7%	18,251	77.7%	36,622	8,434	18,371									63,427
South West Hertfordshire	HRT	E	Con	Con	32,791	55.8%	15,784	77.7%	32,791	8,966	17,007									58,764
South West Norfolk	NFK	E	Con	Con	32,519	57.6%	20,436	76.0%	32,519	11,844	12,083									56,446
South West Surrey	SRY	SE	Con	Con	34,024	59.5%	14,343	78.4%	34,024	3,224	19,681								299	57,228
South Worcestershire	WOR	WM	Con	Con	32,277	55.3%	13,645	75.6%	32,277	6,374	18,632					1,089				58,372
Southampton Itchen	HAM	SE	Con	Con	24,419	44.3%	6,716	75.9%	24,419	17,703	13,006									55,128
Southampton Test	HAM	SE	Con	Con	25,722	45.6%	6,954	76.4%	25,722	18,768	11,950									56,440
Southend East	ESS	E	Con	Con	23,573	58.0%	13,847	69.3%	23,573	7,296	9,906									40,955
Southend West	ESS	E	Con	Con	28,003	54.4%	8,400	75.3%	28,003	3,899	19,603									51,505
Southport	MSY	NW	Con	Lib	26,110	47.9%	1,849	76.3%	24,261	3,483	26,110					653				54,507
Southwark and Bermondsey	LND	LND	Lib	Lib	17,072	47.4%	2,779	64.9%	4,522	14,293	17,072								108	35,995
Spelthorne	SRY	SE	Con	Con	32,440	60.0%	20,050	74.1%	32,440	9,227	12,390									54,057
St Albans	HRT	E	Con	Con	31,726	52.5%	10,881	80.2%	31,726	6,922	20,845					788			110	60,391
St Helens North	MSY	NW	Lab	Lab	28,989	53.7%	14,260	76.3%	14,729	28,989	10,300									54,018
St Helens South	MSY	NW	Lab	Lab	27,027	54.6%	13,801	76.3%	13,226	27,027	9,252									49,505
St Ives	CUL	SW	Con	Con	25,174	48.4%	7,555	77.2%	25,174	9,275	17,619									52,059
Stafford	STS	WM	Con	Con	29,541	51.3%	13,707	79.5%	29,541	12,177	15,834									57,552
Staffordshire Moorlands	STS	WM	Con	Con	31,613	52.9%	14,427	80.4%	31,613	17,186	10,950									59,749
Staffordshire South East	STS	WM	Con	Con	25,115	47.2%	10,885	80.4%	25,115	13,874	14,230									53,219
Stalybridge and Hyde	GTM	NW	Lab	Lab	24,401	48.4%	5,663	74.2%	18,738	24,401	7,311									50,450
Stamford and Spalding	LIN	EM	Con	Con	31,000	56.5%	13,991	77.8%	31,000	6,882	17,009									54,891
Stevenage	HRT	E	Con	Con	23,541	42.1%	5,340	80.5%	23,541	14,229	18,201									55,971
Stirling	SRG	SCT	Con	Con	17,591	38.3%	948	79.4%	17,591	16,643	6,804	4,897								45,935
Stockport	GTM	NW	Con	Con	19,410	41.4%	2,853	78.1%	19,410	16,557	10,365					573				46,332
Stockton North	CLV	NE	Lab	Lab	26,043	49.2%	8,801	75.4%	17,242	26,043	9,712									52,997
Stockton South	CLV	NE	SDP	Con	20,833	35.0%	774	79.0%	20,833	18,600	20,059									59,492
Stoke-on-Trent Central	STS	WM	Lab	Lab	23,842	52.5%	9,770	68.8%	14,072	23,842	7,462									45,376
Stoke-on-Trent North	STS	WM	Lab	Lab	25,459	47.1%	8,513	72.9%	16,946	25,459	11,665									54,070
Stoke-on-Trent South	STS	WM	Lab	Lab	24,794	47.5%	5,053	73.7%	19,741	24,794	7,669									52,204
Strangford	NIR	NIR	UUP	UUP	28,199	75.9%	20,646	57.6%					28,199						8,938	37,137
Stratford-on-Avon	WAR	WM	Con	Con	38,483	61.9%	21,165	76.5%	38,483	6,335	17,318									62,136
Strathkelvin and Bearsden	EDB	SCT	Con	Lab	19,639	38.1%	2,452	82.2%	17,187	19,639	11,034	3,654								51,514
Streatham	LND	LND	Con	Con	18,916	44.9%	2,407	69.5%	18,916	16,509	6,663									42,088
Stretford	GTM	NW	Lab	Lab	22,831	55.2%	9,402	71.9%	13,429	22,831	5,125									41,385
Stroud	GLS	SW	Con	Con	32,883	50.2%	12,375	80.6%	32,883	12,145	20,508									65,553
Suffolk Central	SFK	E	Con	Con	32,422	53.7%	16,290	76.2%	32,422	11,817	16,132									60,371
Suffolk Coastal	SFK	E	Con	Con	32,834	55.7%	15,280	77.9%	32,834	7,534	17,554					1,049				58,971
Sunderland North	TWR	NE	Lab	Lab	29,767	55.8%	14,672	70.5%	15,095	29,767	8,518									53,380
Sunderland South	TWR	NE	Lab	Lab	28,823	54.0%	12,613	71.1%	16,210	28,823	7,768					516				53,317
Surbiton	LND	LND	Con	Con	19,861	55.9%	9,741	78.3%	19,861	5,111	10,120					465				35,557
Sutton and Cheam	LND	LND	Con	Con	29,710	60.8%	15,718	78.3%	29,710	5,202	13,992									48,904
Sutton Coldfield	WMD	WM	Con	Con	34,475	64.0%	21,183	74.5%	34,475	6,104	13,292									53,871
Swansea East	WGM	WLS	Lab	Lab	27,478	63.7%	19,338	75.4%	8,140	27,478	6,380				1,145					43,143
Swansea West	WGM	WLS	Lab	Lab	22,089	48.5%	7,062	76.0%	15,027	22,089	7,019				902	469				45,506
Swindon	WIL	SW	Con	Con	29,385	43.8%	4,857	77.8%	29,385	24,528	13,114									67,027
Tatton	CHS	NW	Con	Con	30,128	54.6%	17,094	76.8%	30,128	11,760	13,034								263	55,185
Taunton	SOM	SW	Con	Con	30,248	51.4%	10,380	79.4%	30,248	8,754	19,868									58,870
Teignbridge	DEV	SW	Con	Con	30,693	53.2%	10,425	80.3%	30,693	6,413	20,268								312	57,686
The Wrekin	SPS	WM	Con	Lab	27,681	42.8%	1,456	78.3%	26,225	27,681	10,737									64,643
Thurrock	ESS	E	Lab	Con	20,527	42.5%	690	71.5%	20,527	19,837	7,970									48,334
Tiverton	DEV	SW	Con	Con	29,875	55.0%	9,212	79.7%	29,875	3,400	20,663					1,168			434	54,372
Tonbridge and Malling	KNT	SE	Con	Con	33,990	56.9%	16,429	77.8%	33,990	7,803	17,561								369	59,725
Tooting	LND	LND	Lab	Lab	21,457	44.2%	1,441	71.2%	20,016	21,457	6,423					621				48,517
Torbay	DEV	SW	Con	Con	29,029	54.0%	8,820	76.4%	29,029	4,538	20,209									53,776
Torfaen	GNT	WLS	Lab	Lab	26,577	58.7%	17,550	75.6%	8,632	26,577	9,027				577	450				45,263
Torridge and West Devon	DEV	SW	Con	Con	29,484	50.3%	6,468	78.7%	29,484	4,990	23,016					1,168				58,658
Tottenham	LND	LND	Lab	Lab	21,921	43.6%	4,141	66.1%	17,780	21,921	8,983					744			843	50,271
Truro	CUL	SW	Lib	Lib	28,368	49.0%	4,753	79.9%	23,615	5,882	28,368									47,865
Tunbridge Wells	KNT	SE	Con	Con	33,111	58.4%	16,122	74.3%	33,111	6,555	16,989									56,655
Tweeddale, Ettrick and Lauderdale	DFG	SCT	Lib	Lib	14,599	49.9%	5,942	77.2%	8,657	3,320	14,599	2,660								29,236
Twickenham	LND	LND	Con	Con	27,331	51.9%	7,127	81.5%	27,331	4,415	20,204					746				52,696
Tyne Bridge	TWR	NE	Lab	Lab	23,131	63.0%	15,573	63.1%	7,558	23,131	6,005									36,694
Tynemouth	TWR	NE	Con	Con	25,113	43.2%	2,583	78.1%	25,113	22,530	10,446									58,089
Upminster	LND	LND	Con	Con	27,946	55.8%	16,857	75.2%	27,946	11,069	11,089									50,104
Upper Bann	NIR	NIR	UUP	UUP	25,137	61.5%	17,361	66.0%					35,137	8,676				3,126	4,491	41,430
Uxbridge	LND	LND	Con	Con	27,292	56.5%	15,970	76.5%	27,292	11,322	9,164					549				48,327
Vale of Glamorgan	SGM	WLS	Con	Con	24,229	46.8%	6,251	79.3%	24,229	17,978	8,633				946					51,786
Vauxhall	LND	LND	Lab	Lab	21,364	50.2%	9,019	64.0%	12,345	21,364	7,764					770				42,583
Wakefield	WYK	YTH	Lab	Lab	24,509	46.6%	2,789	75.6%	21,720	24,509	6,350									52,579
Wallasey	MRY	NW	Con	Con	22,791	42.5%	279	79.8%	22,791	22,512	8,363									53,945
Wallsend	TWR	NE	Lab	Lab	32,709	56.8%	19,384	75.0%	13,325	32,709	11,508									57,542
Walsall North	WMD	WM	Lab	Lab	21,458	42.6%	1,790	73.8%	19,668	21,458	9,285									50,411
Walsall South	WMD	WM	Lab	Lab	22,629	44.9%	1,116	75.5%	21,513	22,629	6,241									50,383
Walthamstow	LND	LND	Lab	Con	13,748	39.0%	1,512	72.4%	13,748	12,236	8,852								396	35,232
Wansbeck	NBL	NE	Lab	Lab	28,080	57.5%	16,789	78.0%	9,490	28,080	11,291									48,861
Wansdyke	SOM	SW	Con	Con	31,537	51.6%	16,144	81.3%	31,537	14,231	15,393									61,161
Wanstead and Woodford	LND	LND	Con	Con	25,701	61.3%	16,412	72.4%	25,701	6,958	9,289									41,948
Wantage	OXF	SE	Con	Con	27,951	54.0%	12,156	77.9%	27,951	8,055	15,795									51,801
Warley East	WMD	WM	Lab	Lab	19,428	50.2%	5,585	69.4%	13,843	19,428	5,396									38,667
Warley West	WMD	WM	Lab	Lab	19,825	49.2%	5,393	70.0%	14,432	19,825	6,027									40,284
Warrington North	CHS	NW	Lab	Lab	27,422	48.2%	8,013	75.2%	19,409	27,422	10,046									56,877
Warrington South	CHS	NW	Con	Con	24,809	42.0%	3,609	75.2%	24,809	21,200	13,112									59,121
Warwick and Leamington	WAR	WM	Con	Con	27,530	49.8%	13,982	76.0%	27,530	13,019	13,548					1,214				55,311
Watford	HRT	E	Con	Con	27,912	48.7%	11,736	77.9%	27,912	16,176	13,202									57,290
Waveney	SFK	E	Con	Con	31,067	48.4%	11,783	78.4%	31,067	19,284	13,845									64,196
Wealden	SXE	SE	Con	Con	35,154	64.2%	20,110	75.0%	35,154	4,563	15,044									54,761
Wellingborough	NTH	EM	Con	Con	29,038	52.7%	14,070	78.1%	29,038	14,968	11,047									55,053
Wells	SOM	SW	Con	Con	28,624	53.5%	8,541	79.6%	28,624	4,637	20,083								134	53,478
Welwyn Hatfield	HRT	E	Con	Con	27,164	45.6%	10,903	80.9%	27,164	15,699	16,261								401	59,525
Wentworth	SYK	YTH	Lab	Lab	30,205	65.2%	20,092	72.6%	10,113	30,205	6,031									46,349
West Derbyshire	DBY	EM	Con	Con	31,224	53.1%	10,527	83.1%	31,224	6,875	20,697									58,796
West Gloucestershire	GLS	SW	Con	Con	29,257	46.1%	11,499	81.4%	29,257	17,758	16,440									63,455
West Hertfordshire	HRT	E	Con	Con	31,760	49.7%	14,924	80.9%	31,760	15,317	16,836									63,913
West Lancashire	LAN	NW	Con	Con	26,500	43.7%	1,353	79.7%	26,500	25,147	8,972					570				60,619
West Bromwich East	WMD	WM	Lab	Lab	18,162	42.6%	983	73.2%	17,179	18,162	7,268									42,609
West Bromwich West	WMD	WM	Lab	Lab	19,925	50.5%	5,253	67.0%	14,672	19,925	4,877									39,474
Westbury	WIL	SW	Con	Con	34,256	51.6%	10,097	78.2%	34,256	7,982	24,159									66,397
Western Isles	WEI	SCT	SNP	Lab	7,041	42.7%	2,340	70.2%	1,336	7,041	3,419	4,701								16,497
Westminster North	LND	LND	Con	Con	19,941	47.3%	3,310	71.1%	19,941	16,631	5,116					450				42,138
Westmorland and Lonsdale	CMA	NW	Con	Con	30,259	57.6%	14,920	74.8%	30,259	6,968	15,339									52,566
Weston-super-Mare	SOM	SW	Con	Con	28,547	49.4%	7,998	75.7%	28,547	6,584	20,549					2,067				57,747
Wigan	GTM	NW	Lab	Lab	33,955	61.5%	20,462	76.6%	13,493	33,955	7,732									55,179
Wimbledon	LND	LND	Con	Con	24,538	50.9%	11,301	76.1%	24,538	10,428	13,237									48,203
Winchester	HAM	SE	Con	Con	32,195	52.4%	7,479	80.4%	32,195	4,028	24,716					565				61,504
Windsor and Maidenhead	BRK	SE	Con	Con	33,980	56.8%	17,836	75.4%	33,980	6,678	16,144					711			2,266	59,779
Wirral South	MSY	NW	Con	Con	24,821	50.2%	10,963	79.4%	24,821	13,858	10,779									49,458
Wirral West	MSY	NW	Con	Con	25,736	51.9%	12,723	77.9%	25,736	13,013	10,015					806				49,570
Witney	OXF	SE	Con	Con	33,458	57.5%	18,464	77.3%	33,458	9,733	14,994									58,185
Woking	SRY	SE	Con	Con	35,990	58.1%	16,544	75.1%	35,990	6,537	19,446									61,973
Wokingham	BRK	SE	Con	Con	39,808	61.4%	20,387	78.1%	39,808	5,622	19,421									64,851
Wolverhampton North East	WMD	WM	Lab	Con	19,857	42.1%	204	74.3%	19,857	19,653	7,623									47,133
Wolverhampton South East	WMD	WM	Lab	Lab	19,760	48.9%	6,398	72.5%	13,362	19,760	7,258									40,380
Wolverhampton South West	WMD	WM	Con	Con	26,235	50.7%	10,318	75.5%	26,235	15,917	9,616									51,768
Woodspring	SOM	SW	Con	Con	34,134	56.6%	17,852	79.1%	34,134	8,717	16,282					1,208				60,341
Woolwich	LND	LND	SDP	SDP	17,137	41.7%	1,937	70.7%	8,723	15,200	17,137									41,060
Worcester	WOR	WM	Con	Con	25,504	48.2%	10,453	76.7%	25,504	15,051	12,386									52,941
Workington	CMA	NW	Lab	Lab	24,019	52.4%	7,019	80.6%	17,000	24,019	4,853									45,872
Worsley	GTM	NW	Lab	Lab	27,157	48.1%	7,337	77.2%	19,820	27,157	9,507									56,484
Worthing	WSX	SE	Con	Con	34,579	61.7%	18,501	72.8%	34,579	5,387	16,072									56,032
Wrexham	CLY	WLS	Lab	Lab	22,144	43.9%	4,152	80.9%	17,992	22,144	9,808				539					50,483
Wycombe	BKM	SE	Con	Con	28,209	53.9%	13,819	72.8%	28,209	9,773	14,390									56,611
Wyre	LAN	NW	Con	Con	26,800	53.1%	14,661	75.4%	26,800	10,725	12,139					874				50,538
Wyre Forest	WOR	WM	Con	Con	25,877	47.1%	7,224	77.6%	25,877	10,365	18,653									54,895
Yeovil	SOM	SW	Lib	Lib	28,841	51.4%	5,700	79.7%	23,141	4,099	28,841									56,081
Ynys Môn	GWN	WLS	Con	PC	18,580	43.2%	4,298	79.7%	14,282	7,252	2,863				18,580					42,977
York	NYK	YTH	Con	Con	25,880	41.6%	147	78.4%	25,880	25,733	9,898					637				62,148
Total for all constituencies								75.3%	13,760,583	10,029,807	7,341,633	416,473	276,230	154,067	123,599	89,753	85,642	83,389	168,402	32,529,578
Total for all constituencies								75.3%	42.2%	30.8%	22.6%	1.3%	0.8%	0.5%	0.4%	0.3%	0.3%	0.3%	0.5%	100.0%
Total for all constituencies								75.3%	Seats											
Total for all constituencies								75.3%	375	229	22	3	9	3	3	0	3	1	2	650
Total for all constituencies								75.3%	57.9%	35.2%	3.4%	0.5%	1.4%	0.5%	0.5%	0.0%	0.5%	0.2%	0.3%	100.0%

== See also ==
- 1987 United Kingdom general election
- List of MPs elected in the 1987 United Kingdom general election
