= Dunfermline Burghs =

Former UK Parliament constituency

- Former burgh constituency for the House of Commons
- Major settlements: Dunfermline, Cowdenbeath, Inverkeithing, and Lochgelly

1950–1974
- Seats: One
- Replaced by: Dunfermline

1918–1950
- Seats: One
- Type of constituency: District of Burghs constituency
- Created from: West Fife

Dunfermline Burghs was a burgh constituency of the House of Commons of the Parliament of the United Kingdom from 1918 until 1974. It elected one Member of Parliament (MP) using the first-past-the-post voting system.

From 1918 to 1950 it was also, officially, a district of burghs constituency.

There was also a Dunfermline county constituency from 1974 to 1983.

== Boundaries ==
As defined in 1918 the constituency covered the parliamentary burghs of Dunfermline, Cowdenbeath, Inverkeithing, and Lochgelly. Prior to the constituency's creation, the burghs of Dunfermline and Inverkeithing had been represented as components of Stirling Burghs, while Cowdenbeath and Lochgelly were within the county constituency of West Fife.

== Members of Parliament ==
| Election | Member | Party | Notes |
|---|---|---|---|
| 1918 | John Wallace | Coalition Liberal | |
| Jan 1922 | John Wallace | National Liberal | |
| Nov 1922 | William Watson | Labour | |
| 1931 | John Wallace | Liberal National | Knighted January 1935 |
| 1935 | William Watson | Labour | |
| 1950 | James Clunie | Labour | |
| 1959 | Alan Thompson | Labour | |
| 1964 | Adam Hunter | Labour | Subsequently, MP for Dunfermline |
| Feb 1974 | constituency abolished: see Dunfermline | | |

== Election results ==
=== Elections in the 1910s ===
General election 1918: Dunfermline Burghs
| Party | | Candidate | Votes | % |
|---|---|---|---|---|
| C | National Liberal | John Wallace | 6,886 | 44.6 |
| | Independent Labour | William McLean Watson | 5,076 | 32.8 |
| | Independent Democrat | Arthur Ponsonby | 3,491 | 22.6 |
| Majority | | | 1,810 | 11.8 |
| Turnout | | | 15,453 | 55.2 |
| | National Liberal win (new seat) | | | |
C indicates candidate endorsed by the coalition government.

=== Elections in the 1920s ===
General election 1922: Dunfermline Burghs
| Party | Candidate | Votes | % | ±% |
|---|---|---|---|---|
| Labour | William McLean Watson | 11,652 | 50.4 | +17.6 |
| National Liberal | John Wallace | 11,451 | 49.6 | +5.0 |
| Majority | | 201 | 0.8 | N/A |
| Turnout | | 23,102 | 77.5 | +22.3 |
| Labour gain from National Liberal | | Swing | +6.3 | |

General election 1923: Dunfermline Burghs
| Party | Candidate | Votes | % | ±% |
|---|---|---|---|---|
| Labour | William McLean Watson | 12,606 | 53.6 | +3.2 |
| Liberal | John Wallace | 10,931 | 46.4 | −3.2 |
| Majority | | 1,675 | 7.2 | +6.4 |
| Turnout | | 23,537 | 77.7 | +0.2 |
| Labour hold | | Swing | +3.2 | |

General election 1924: Dunfermline Burghs
| Party | Candidate | Votes | % | ±% |
|---|---|---|---|---|
| Labour | William McLean Watson | 13,887 | 57.9 | +4.3 |
| Liberal | Francis John Robertson | 10,118 | 42.1 | −4.3 |
| Majority | | 3,769 | 15.8 | +8.6 |
| Turnout | | 24,005 | 78.7 | +1.0 |
| Labour hold | | Swing | +4.3 | |

General election 1929: Dunfermline Burghs
| Party | Candidate | Votes | % | ±% |
|---|---|---|---|---|
| Labour | William McLean Watson | 15,288 | 58.5 | +0.6 |
| Unionist | Allan Beaton | 9,146 | 35.0 | New |
| Communist | Jack Leckie | 1,712 | 6.5 | New |
| Majority | | 6,132 | 23.5 | +7.7 |
| Turnout | | 26,146 | 74.1 | −4.6 |
| Labour hold | | Swing | | |

=== Elections in the 1930s ===
General election 1931: Dunfermline Burghs
| Party | Candidate | Votes | % | ±% |
|---|---|---|---|---|
| National Liberal | John Wallace | 16,863 | 57.9 | +22.9 |
| Labour | William McLean Watson | 12,247 | 42.1 | −16.4 |
| Majority | | 4,616 | 15.8 | N/A |
| Turnout | | 29,110 | 80.2 | +6.1 |
| National Liberal gain from Labour | | Swing | | |

General election 1935: Dunfermline Burghs
| Party | Candidate | Votes | % | ±% |
|---|---|---|---|---|
| Labour | William McLean Watson | 16,271 | 52.3 | +10.2 |
| National Liberal | John Wallace | 14,848 | 47.7 | −10.2 |
| Majority | | 1,423 | 4.6 | N/A |
| Turnout | | 31,119 | 81.6 | +1.4 |
| Labour gain from National Liberal | | Swing | +10.2 | |

=== Elections in the 1940s ===
General election 1945: Dunfermline Burghs
| Party | Candidate | Votes | % | ±% |
|---|---|---|---|---|
| Labour | William McLean Watson | 22,021 | 64.7 | +12.4 |
| National Liberal | James Henderson | 12,028 | 35.3 | −12.4 |
| Majority | | 9,993 | 29.4 | +24.8 |
| Turnout | | 34,049 | 73.0 | −8.6 |
| Labour hold | | Swing | +12.4 | |

=== Elections in the 1950s ===
General election 1950: Dunfermline Burghs
| Party | Candidate | Votes | % | ±% |
|---|---|---|---|---|
| Labour | James Clunie | 23,641 | 61.2 | −3.5 |
| National Liberal | James Stuart Kerr | 14,967 | 38.8 | +3.5 |
| Majority | | 8,674 | 22.4 | −7.0 |
| Turnout | | 38,608 | 83.9 | +10.9 |
| Labour hold | | Swing | | |

General election 1951: Dunfermline Burghs
| Party | Candidate | Votes | % | ±% |
|---|---|---|---|---|
| Labour | James Clunie | 24,547 | 61.1 | −0.1 |
| National Liberal | James Stuart Kerr | 15,657 | 38.9 | +0.1 |
| Majority | | 8,890 | 22.2 | −0.2 |
| Turnout | | 40,204 | 85.5 | +1.6 |
| Labour hold | | Swing | | |

General election 1955: Dunfermline Burghs
| Party | Candidate | Votes | % | ±% |
|---|---|---|---|---|
| Labour | James Clunie | 22,146 | 60.1 | −1.0 |
| National Liberal | Charlotte R McNee | 14,170 | 39.9 | +1.0 |
| Majority | | 8,674 | 21.2 | −1.0 |
| Turnout | | 36,316 | 83.9 | −1.6 |
| Labour hold | | Swing | | |

General election 1959: Dunfermline Burghs
| Party | Candidate | Votes | % | ±% |
|---|---|---|---|---|
| Labour | Alan Thompson | 23,478 | 61.4 | +1.3 |
| National Liberal | Archie Elliott | 14,744 | 38.6 | −1.3 |
| Majority | | 8,734 | 22.8 | +1.6 |
| Turnout | | 38,222 | 82.9 | −1.0 |
| Labour hold | | Swing | | |

=== Elections in the 1960s ===
General election 1964: Dunfermline Burghs
| Party | Candidate | Votes | % | ±% |
|---|---|---|---|---|
| Labour | Adam Hunter | 22,468 | 61.6 | +0.2 |
| National Liberal | Ian Kirkwood | 14,033 | 38.4 | −0.2 |
| Majority | | 8,435 | 23.2 | +0.4 |
| Turnout | | 36,501 | 77.2 | −5.7 |
| Labour hold | | Swing | | |

General election 1966: Dunfermline Burghs
| Party | Candidate | Votes | % | ±% |
|---|---|---|---|---|
| Labour | Adam Hunter | 20,709 | 58.4 | −3.2 |
| Conservative | Ian Kirkwood | 9,446 | 26.6 | −11.8 |
| SNP | James A Cook | 5,304 | 15.0 | New |
| Majority | | 11,263 | 31.8 | +8.6 |
| Turnout | | 35,459 | 76.3 | −0.9 |
| Labour hold | | Swing | | |

=== Elections in the 1970s ===
General election 1970: Dunfermline Burghs
| Party | Candidate | Votes | % | ±% |
|---|---|---|---|---|
| Labour | Adam Hunter | 21,532 | 57.1 | −1.3 |
| Conservative | Ian Kirkwood | 12,086 | 32.0 | +5.4 |
| SNP | James A Cook | 3,657 | 9.7 | −5.3 |
| Communist | John Neilson | 462 | 1.2 | New |
| Majority | | 9,446 | 25.1 | −6.7 |
| Turnout | | 37,737 | 74.0 | −2.3 |
| Labour hold | | Swing | | |

== See also ==
- Former United Kingdom Parliament constituencies
