= James Wellwood Johnston =

James Wellwood Johnston (5 April 1900 – 18 September 1958) was a British lawyer and politician.

== Early life ==
The elder son of Christopher Johnston, Lord Sands, he was educated at Rugby School and New College, Oxford. He was called to the Scottish bar in 1924.

== Professional career ==
He was a Unionist Member of Parliament (MP) for Clackmannan and Eastern Stirlingshire.

This was normally a Labour seat, which he did fairly well to win from the sitting MP, Lauchlin MacNeill Weir, in the National Government landslide of 1931. However Weir narrowly won it back in 1935.

He was appointed as sheriff substitute of Lanarkshire at Lanark in 1940.

Parliament of the United Kingdom
Preceded by MacNeill Weir	Member of Parliament for Clackmannan and Eastern Stirlingshire; 1931 – 1935	Succeeded by MacNeill Weir
