= 1939 Clackmannanshire and East Stirlingshire by-election =

UK Parliamentary by-election

The 1939 Clackmannanshire and East Stirlingshire by-election was held on 13 October 1939. The by-election was held due to the death of the incumbent Labour MP, Lauchlin MacNeill Weir. It was won by the Labour candidate Arthur Woodburn.

1939 Clackmannan and Eastern Stirlingshire by-election
Party	Candidate	Votes	%	±%
Labour	Arthur Woodburn	15,645	93.7	+51.4
Pacifist	Andrew Stewart	1,060	6.4	New
Majority		14,585	87.3	+84.0
Turnout		16,705	35.4	−40.8
Labour hold		Swing		
