= Dunfermline (UK Parliament constituency) =

UK Parliament constituency (1974–1983)

- Former county constituency for the House of Commons
- Major settlements: Dunfermline

1974–1983
- Seats: One
- Created from: Dunfermline Burghs
- Replaced by: Dunfermline East; Dunfermline West

Dunfermline was a county constituency of the House of Commons of the Parliament of the United Kingdom from 1974 until 1983.

There was also an earlier Dunfermline Burghs constituency, from 1918 to 1974.

== Boundaries ==
The constituency was defined by the Second Periodical Review of the Boundary Commission, and first used in the February 1974 general election, as one of four constituencies covering the county of Fife. The other three constituencies were Central Fife, East Fife and Kirkcaldy.

The Dunfermline constituency covered the Dunfermline district of the county and the burghs of Culross, Dunfermline, and Inverkeithing.

February 1974 boundaries were used also in the general elections of October 1974 and 1979.

In 1975 Scottish counties and burghs were abolished under the Local Government (Scotland) Act 1973 and replaced with two-tier regions and districts and unitary islands council areas. The Third Periodical Review took account of new local government boundaries, and results were implemented for the 1983 general election. The Dunfermline constituency was divided between new Dunfermline East and Dunfermline West constituencies.

== Members of Parliament ==
Election	Member	Party	Notes
Feb 1974	Adam Hunter	Labour	previously MP for Dunfermline Burghs
1979	Dick Douglas	Labour Co-operative	
1983	constituency abolished: see Dunfermline East and Dunfermline West		

== Election results ==
=== Elections in the 1970s ===
General election February 1974: Dunfermline
Party	Candidate	Votes	%	±%
Labour	Adam Hunter	19,201	39.31	
Conservative	J.M. Fraser	14,791	30.28	
SNP	R.R. Patrick	8,695	17.80	
Liberal	M.D.H. Valentine	6,153	12.60	
Majority		4,410	9.03	
Turnout		29,639		
Labour win (new seat)				

General election October 1974: Dunfermline
Party	Candidate	Votes	%	±%
Labour	Adam Hunter	18,470	40.10	
SNP	A.C. Cameron	13,179	28.61	
Conservative	Kenneth Macleod	10,611	23.04	
Liberal	M.D.H. Valentine	3,800	8.25	
Majority		5,291	11.49	
Turnout		46,060		
Labour hold		Swing		

General election 1979: Dunfermline
Party	Candidate	Votes	%	±%
Labour Co-op	Dick Douglas	22,803	44.32	
Conservative	A. Lester	15,490	30.11	
SNP	A.C. Cameron	7,351	14.29	
Liberal	Gordon Whitelaw	5,803	11.28	
Majority		7,313	14.21	
Turnout		51,447		
Labour Co-op hold		Swing		

== See also ==
- Former United Kingdom Parliament constituencies
