= William McLean Watson =

British politician (1874–1962)

William McLean Watson (27 October 1874 – May 1962) became Labour MP for Dunfermline Burghs, Scotland, in 1922. He lost his seat in the National Government landslide of 1931, but won it back in 1935 and retained it until 1950.

Before his career in politics, he was a miner and an official in the Scottish miners' union. He first contested the seat unsuccessfully in 1918.

Parliament of the United Kingdom
Preceded by John Wallace	Member of Parliament for Dunfermline Burghs; 1922–1931	Succeeded by John Wallace
Preceded by John Wallace	Member of Parliament for Dunfermline Burghs; 1935–1950	Succeeded by James Clunie
