= James Clunie =

British politician

- Born: 20 March 1889
- Died: 25 February 1974 (aged 84)
- Occupations: Labour Party politician and Member of Parliament
- Years active: 1950–1959

James Clunie (20 March 1889 – 25 February 1974) was a British Labour Party politician.

Born in Lower Largo, Clunie worked as a house painter and decorator. He joined the Scottish Painters' Society, serving on its executive, and also came to chair Dunfermline Trades Council. From 1933 until 1950, he served on Dunfermline Town Council. In 1950, he was elected as Member of Parliament (MP) for Dunfermline Burghs, serving until his retirement in 1959.

== Works ==
- (1920) The First Principles of Working Class Education, Glasgow: Socialist Labour Press
- (1954) Labour is my Faith: The autobiography of a house painter, Dunfermline: A Romanes & Son

Parliament of the United Kingdom
Preceded by William Watson	Member of Parliament for Dunfermline Burghs; 1950–1959	Succeeded by Alan Thompson
