= Dick Douglas =

Scottish politician (1932–2014)

Member of Parliament for Dunfermline West Dunfermline (1979–1983)
- In office 3 May 1979 – 16 March 1992
- Preceded by: Adam Hunter
- Succeeded by: Rachel Squire

Member of Parliament for Clackmannan and Eastern Stirlingshire
- In office 18 June 1970 – 8 February 1974
- Preceded by: Arthur Woodburn
- Succeeded by: George Reid

Personal details
- Born: Richard Giles Douglas; 4 January 1932
- Died: 3 May 2014 (aged 82)
- Party: Labour (before 1964-1990) SNP (1990-2014)

Richard Giles Douglas (4 January 1932 – 3 May 2014) was a Scottish politician who was a Member of Parliament (MP) elected as a Labour Co-operative candidate, but who subsequently joined the Scottish National Party (SNP).

== Political career ==
He first stood for Parliament at South Angus in the 1964 General Election, but was beaten by the Conservative Jock Bruce-Gardyne. Next he stood unsuccessfully for Edinburgh West in the 1966 General Election, against the Conservative incumbent Anthony Stodart.

In 1967 Douglas was a Labour councillor and the defeated candidate at a by-election in Glasgow Pollok. In the 1970 general election Douglas stood as the Labour and Co-operative candidate for Clackmannan and Eastern Stirlingshire and was elected to the House of Commons. He did not retain the seat in the February 1974 General Election, nor regain it in October 1974.

In the 1979 general election he stood as the Labour and Co-operative candidate for Dunfermline and was elected again. By the time of the 1983 General Election the constituency boundaries had been revised, so Douglas stood as the Labour and Co-operative candidate for the new Dunfermline West constituency. Douglas was elected, and won the constituency again in the 1987 General Election.

In 1990 Douglas defected from Labour to the SNP. He took this decision feeling the Labour Party was adopting too centrist a position on the political spectrum, and he was especially angry at the lack of direction in the Labour Party in their attitude to the Poll Tax. He favoured a non-payment campaign which Labour did not officially support, whilst the SNP had been quick to adopt such as policy. Douglas' defection took the number of SNP MPs from four to five through to the 1992 general election. At that election Douglas decided not to seek re-election in Dunfermline West, the seat he had represented for 13 years, but to stand against Donald Dewar (a then high-profile Scottish Labour MP) in his Glasgow Garscadden seat. He was unsuccessful, with Dewar winning his seat comfortably and Dunfermline West returning a Labour MP. Douglas did not return to front-line active politics, but remained a member of the SNP.

== Death ==
Douglas died, aged 82, on 3 May 2014. Then Scottish first Minister, Alex Salmond paid tribute to Douglas saying he was an "extraordinary politician".

Parliament of the United Kingdom
Preceded by Arthur Woodburn	Member of Parliament for Clackmannan and East Stirlingshire; 1970 – February 1974	Succeeded by George Reid
Preceded by Adam Hunter	Member of Parliament for Dunfermline; 1979–1983	Constituency abolished
New constituency	Member of Parliament for Dunfermline West; 1983–1992	Succeeded by Rachel Squire
