= Alan Thompson (British politician) =

British politician

Professor Alan Thompson MP

Member of Parliament for Dunfermline Burghs
- In office 8 October 1959 – 25 September 1964
- Preceded by: James Clunie
- Succeeded by: Adam Hunter

Personal details
- Born: Alan Eric Thompson; 16 September 1924 Kingston upon Hull, England
- Died: 18 February 2017 (aged 92) Edinburgh, Scotland
- Party: Labour
- Spouse: Mary Long (m. 1960)
- Children: Four
- Education: University of Edinburgh

Prof. Alan Eric Thompson (16 September 1924 – 18 February 2017) was a British Labour Party politician.

== Early life ==
Born in Kingston upon Hull, Thompson was educated at Hull Grammar School and – following wartime service in the Green Howards – the University of Edinburgh, where he received a first-class M.A. (Hons.) in Economic Science in 1951 and a Ph.D. in the same subject in 1953. A protégé of the poet and economist Sir Alexander Gray, his doctoral thesis was on the nationalisation of the British coal industry, focusing in particular on the Lothian coalfield.

== Career ==
Thompson was active in politics from a young age, and was formerly president of the Edinburgh University Labour Club. Having contested Galloway unsuccessfully as a Labour candidate in the 1950 and 1951 general elections, he served as Member of Parliament for Dunfermline Burghs from 1959 to 1964. Although an active participant in parliamentary debates, the stress of maintaining "full-on commitment" and commuting from Edinburgh to London quickly took its toll on his health, and despite being offered the prospect of a junior ministerial post in the event of a Labour victory at the 1964 general election he chose to step down after just one term. He remained, however, a distinctive figure on the moderate, Gaitskellite wing of the party, and was close to many fellow "intellectual" MPs of that stamp, most notably John P. Mackintosh and Douglas Jay.

Thompson was an economics lecturer both before and after his spell in parliament, remaining at the University of Edinburgh for nearly twenty years prior to being appointed A. J. Balfour Professor of the Economics of Government at Heriot-Watt University in 1972. From 1976 to 1979 he also served as chairman of BBC Scotland, having been the parliamentary advisor to STV for most of the previous decade.

Thompson retired from academia in 1984 and died in 2017.

Parliament of the United Kingdom
Preceded by James Clunie	Member of Parliament for Dunfermline Burghs; 1959–1964	Succeeded by Adam Hunter
