= Dunfermline East (UK Parliament constituency) =

UK Parliament constituency (1983–2005)

- Former burgh constituency for the House of Commons
- Boundary of Dunfermline East in Scotland for the 2001 general election
- Major settlements: Cowdenbeath

1983–2005
- Seats: One
- Created from: Central Fife; Dunfermline
- Replaced by: Kirkcaldy & Cowdenbeath; Dunfermline & West Fife; Glenrothes

Dunfermline East was a burgh constituency represented in the House of Commons of the Parliament of the United Kingdom. It elected one Member of Parliament (MP) by the first-past-the-post voting system.

The constituency was created for the 1983 general election from parts of the seats of Central Fife and Dunfermline. It was abolished for the 2005 general election as part of a major revision in the composition of parliamentary constituencies in Scotland.

Most of Dunfermline East and its neighbouring constituency Kirkcaldy now make up the new seat of Kirkcaldy and Cowdenbeath. The remaining parts of the seat were moved to the new Dunfermline and West Fife and Glenrothes constituencies.

The constituency's name was something of a misnomer as it never included any part of the town of Dunfermline, all of which was located in the Dunfermline West seat. Cowdenbeath was the largest town in the constituency.

The seat's sole representative from its establishment for the 1983 General Election to its disestablishment in 2005 was Gordon Brown, who served as Chancellor of the Exchequer between 1997 and 2007, and would be elected to represent Dunfermline East's replacement constituency of Kirkcaldy & Cowdenbeath at the 2005 General Election, the constituency of which he would serve from as Prime Minister between 2007 and 2010.

== Boundaries ==
1983–1997: The Dunfermline District electoral divisions of Aberdour/Dalgety Bay/North Queensferry, Ballingry/Lochore, Cowdenbeath/Gray Park, Dunfermline/Rosyth, Hill of Beath/Crossgates/Cowdenbeath, Inverkeithing/Rosyth, Kelty/Lumphinnans, and Lochgelly, and the Kirkcaldy District electoral division of Auchterderran.

1997–2005: The Dunfermline District electoral divisions of Aberdour and Mosside, Benarty and Lumphinans, Cowdenbeath, Dalgety Bay, Inverkeithing and North Queensferry, Kelty, Lochgelly, and Rosyth East and South, and the Kirkcaldy District electoral division of Cardenden and Kinglassie.

== Members of Parliament ==
The constituency's only MP was Gordon Brown of the Labour Party, who was Shadow Chancellor of the Exchequer from 1992 to 1997 and Chancellor of the Exchequer from 1997 to 2007, when he became Prime Minister.

Election	Member	Party
1983	Gordon Brown	Labour

== Election results ==
=== Elections in the 1980s ===
General election 1983: Dunfermline East
Party	Candidate	Votes	%	±%
Labour	Gordon Brown	18,515	51.5	−10.5
Liberal	David Harcus	7,214	20.1	
Conservative	Clive Shenton	6,764	18.8	−2.8
SNP	George Hunter	2,573	7.2	−6.8
Communist	Alex Maxwell	864	2.4	
Majority		11,301	31.4	
Turnout		35,930	72.0	
Labour win (new seat)				

General election 1987: Dunfermline East
Party	Candidate	Votes	%	±%
Labour	Gordon Brown	25,381	64.5	+13.0
Conservative	Clive Shenton	5,792	14.8	−4.0
Liberal	Elizabeth Harris	4,122	10.5	−9.6
SNP	Alice McGarry	3,901	10.0	+2.8
Majority		19,589	49.7	+18.3
Turnout		39,196	76.6	+4.6
Labour hold		Swing	+8.5	

=== Elections in the 1990s ===
General election 1992: Dunfermline East
Party	Candidate	Votes	%	±%
Labour	Gordon Brown	23,692	62.4	−2.1
Conservative	Mark E. Tennant	6,248	16.5	+1.7
SNP	John V. Lloyd	5,746	15.1	+5.1
Liberal Democrats	Teresa Martin Little	2,262	6.0	−4.5
Majority		17,444	45.9	−3.8
Turnout		37,948	75.6	−1.0
Labour hold		Swing	−2.4	

General election 1997: Dunfermline East
Party	Candidate	Votes	%	±%
Labour	Gordon Brown	24,441	66.8	+4.4
SNP	John Ramage	5,690	15.6	+0.5
Conservative	Iain Mitchell	3,656	10.0	−6.5
Liberal Democrats	Jim Tolson	2,164	5.9	−0.1
Referendum	Thomas Dunsmore	632	1.7	New
Majority		18,751	51.2	+6.3
Turnout		36,583	69.6	−7.0
Labour hold		Swing	+2.5	

=== Elections in the 2000s ===
General election 2001: Dunfermline East
Party	Candidate	Votes	%	±%
Labour	Gordon Brown	19,487	64.8	−2.0
SNP	Johnny Mellon	4,424	14.7	−0.9
Conservative	Stuart Randall	2,838	9.4	−0.6
Liberal Democrats	John Mainland	2,281	7.6	+1.7
Scottish Socialist	Andrew Jackson	770	2.6	New
UKIP	Thomas Dunsmore	286	1.0	New
Majority		15,063	50.1	−1.1
Turnout		30,086	57.0	−12.6
Labour hold		Swing	-1.4	

== See also ==
- Dunfermline East (Scottish Parliament constituency)

Parliament of the United Kingdom
Preceded by Rushcliffe	Constituency represented by the chancellor of the Exchequer; 1997–2005	Succeeded by Kirkcaldy and Cowdenbeath
