= Clackmannan and Eastern Stirlingshire =

Parliamentary constituency in Scotland, 1918–1983

- Former county constituency for the House of Commons

1918–1983
- Seats: One
- Created from: Stirlingshire, Clackmannan & Kinross and Falkirk Burghs
- Replaced by: Clackmannan, Falkirk East and Falkirk West

Clackmannan and Eastern Stirlingshire was a parliamentary constituency in the Clackmannan area of Central Scotland. It returned one Member of Parliament (MP) to the House of Commons of the Parliament of the United Kingdom, elected by the first past the post system.

The constituency was created for the 1918 general election, and abolished for the 1983 general election, when it was replaced by the new Clackmannan constituency.

The constituency comprised two separate parts, north and south of Falkirk town centre, with part of the similarly split Stirling, Falkirk and Grangemouth constituency in between.

== Boundaries ==
Following the Representation of the People Act 1948, the seat of Clackmannan and East Stirlingshire was described in 1950 as being composed of:

- The Burgh of Clackmannan
- Three wards of Stirlingshire, named at the time as Eastern No. 1, Eastern No. 2, and Eastern No. 3

This would continue until the seat's abolition in 1983.

== Members of Parliament ==
| Election | Member | Party |
|---|---|---|
| 1918 | Ralph Glyn | Unionist |
| 1922 | MacNeill Weir | Labour |
| 1931 | James Wellwood Johnston | Unionist |
| 1935 | MacNeill Weir | Labour |
| 1939 by-election | Arthur Woodburn | Labour |
| 1970 | Dick Douglas | Labour Co-operative |
| Feb 1974 | George Reid | SNP |
| 1979 | Martin O'Neill | Labour |
| 1983 | constituency abolished: see Clackmannan | |

== Elections ==
=== Elections in the 1910s ===
General election 1918: Clackmannan and Eastern Stirlingshire
| Party | | Candidate | Votes | % | ±% |
|---|---|---|---|---|---|
| C | Unionist | Ralph Glyn | 6,771 | 38.5 | |
| | Co-operative Party | Henry May | 5,753 | 32.8 | |
| | Liberal | William Chapple | 5,040 | 28.7 | |
| Majority | | | 1,018 | 5.7 | |
| Turnout | | | 17,564 | 55.0 | |
| Registered electors | | | 31,916 | | |
| | Unionist win (new seat) | | | | |
C indicates candidate endorsed by the coalition government.

=== Elections in the 1920s ===
General election 1922: Clackmannan and Eastern Stirlingshire
| Party | Candidate | Votes | % | ±% |
|---|---|---|---|---|
| Labour | MacNeill Weir | 10,312 | 42.0 | N/A |
| Liberal | Craigie Aitchison | 7,379 | 30.0 | +1.3 |
| Unionist | Ralph Glyn | 6,888 | 28.0 | −10.5 |
| Majority | | 2,933 | 12.0 | N/A |
| Turnout | | 24,579 | 77.9 | +22.9 |
| Registered electors | | 31,563 | | |
| Labour gain from Unionist | | Swing | +9.9 | |

General election 1923: Clackmannan and Eastern Stirlingshire
| Party | Candidate | Votes | % | ±% |
|---|---|---|---|---|
| Labour | MacNeill Weir | 10,492 | 51.1 | +9.1 |
| Liberal | Craigie Aitchison | 10,043 | 48.9 | +18.9 |
| Majority | | 449 | 2.2 | −9.8 |
| Turnout | | 20,535 | 64.2 | −13.7 |
| Registered electors | | 31,976 | | |
| Labour hold | | Swing | −4.9 | |

General election 1924: Clackmannan and Eastern Stirlingshire
| Party | Candidate | Votes | % | ±% |
|---|---|---|---|---|
| Labour | MacNeill Weir | 13,032 | 52.6 | +1.5 |
| Liberal | Edwin Donaldson | 11,752 | 47.4 | −1.5 |
| Majority | | 1,280 | 5.2 | +3.0 |
| Turnout | | 24,784 | 77.0 | +12.8 |
| Registered electors | | 32,195 | | |
| Labour hold | | Swing | +1.5 | |

General election 1929: Clackmannan and Eastern Stirlingshire
| Party | Candidate | Votes | % | ±% |
|---|---|---|---|---|
| Labour | MacNeill Weir | 17,667 | 53.2 | +0.6 |
| Unionist | Harold Mitchell | 8,778 | 26.4 | New |
| Liberal | Edwin Donaldson | 6,760 | 20.4 | −27.0 |
| Majority | | 8,889 | 26.8 | +21.6 |
| Turnout | | 33,205 | 78.0 | +1.0 |
| Registered electors | | 42,567 | | |
| Labour hold | | Swing | +13.8 | |

=== Elections in the 1930s ===
General election 1931: Clackmannan and Eastern Stirlingshire
| Party | Candidate | Votes | % | ±% |
|---|---|---|---|---|
| Unionist | James Wellwood Johnston | 20,425 | 59.9 | +33.5 |
| Labour | MacNeill Weir | 13,669 | 40.1 | −13.1 |
| Majority | | 6,756 | 19.8 | −7.0 |
| Turnout | | 34,094 | 77.7 | −0.3 |
| Unionist gain from Labour | | Swing | | |

General election 1935: Clackmannan and Eastern Stirlingshire
| Party | Candidate | Votes | % | ±% |
|---|---|---|---|---|
| Labour | MacNeill Weir | 14,881 | 42.3 | +2.2 |
| Unionist | James Wellwood Johnston | 13,738 | 39.0 | −20.9 |
| Liberal | George Honeyman | 5,062 | 14.4 | New |
| Ind. Labour Party | David Gibson | 1,513 | 4.3 | N/A |
| Majority | | 1,143 | 3.3 | N/A |
| Turnout | | 35,194 | 76.2 | −1.5 |
| Labour gain from Unionist | | Swing | | |

Clackmannan and Eastern Stirlingshire by-election, 1939
| Party | Candidate | Votes | % | ±% |
|---|---|---|---|---|
| Labour | Arthur Woodburn | 15,645 | 93.7 | +51.4 |
| Pacifist | Andrew Stewart | 1,060 | 6.4 | New |
| Majority | | 14,585 | 87.3 | +84.0 |
| Turnout | | 16,705 | 35.4 | −40.8 |
| Labour hold | | Swing | | |

=== Elections in the 1940s ===
General election 1945: Clackmannan and Eastern Stirlingshire
| Party | Candidate | Votes | % | ±% |
|---|---|---|---|---|
| Labour | Arthur Woodburn | 24,622 | 62.9 | +20.6 |
| Unionist | John Gilmour | 14,522 | 37.1 | −1.9 |
| Majority | | 10,100 | 25.8 | +22.5 |
| Turnout | | 39,144 | 71.9 | −4.3 |
| Labour hold | | Swing | | |

=== Elections in the 1950s ===
General election 1950: Clackmannan and Eastern Stirlingshire
| Party | Candidate | Votes | % | ±% |
|---|---|---|---|---|
| Labour | Arthur Woodburn | 22,980 | 56.5 | −6.4 |
| Unionist | Spencer Douglas Loch | 13,630 | 33.5 | −3.6 |
| Liberal | Charles Hampton Johnston | 4,078 | 10.0 | New |
| Majority | | 9,350 | 23.0 | −2.8 |
| Turnout | | 40,688 | 83.4 | +11.5 |
| Labour hold | | Swing | | |

General election 1951: Clackmannan and Eastern Stirlingshire
| Party | Candidate | Votes | % | ±% |
|---|---|---|---|---|
| Labour | Arthur Woodburn | 25,231 | 58.7 | +2.2 |
| Unionist | Spencer Douglas Loch | 17,727 | 41.3 | +7.8 |
| Majority | | 7,504 | 17.4 | −5.6 |
| Turnout | | 42,958 | 85.7 | +2.3 |
| Labour hold | | Swing | | |

General election 1955: Clackmannan and Eastern Stirlingshire
| Party | Candidate | Votes | % | ±% |
|---|---|---|---|---|
| Labour | Arthur Woodburn | 23,588 | 58.7 | 0.0 |
| Unionist | Raymond Craigie Aitchison | 7,009 | 41.3 | 0.0 |
| Majority | | 9,350 | 17.4 | 0.0 |
| Turnout | | 30,597 | 79.8 | −5.9 |
| Labour hold | | Swing | | |

General election 1959: Clackmannan and Eastern Stirlingshire
| Party | Candidate | Votes | % | ±% |
|---|---|---|---|---|
| Labour | Arthur Woodburn | 25,004 | 59.3 | +0.6 |
| Unionist | Raymond Craigie Aitchison | 17,132 | 40.7 | −0.6 |
| Majority | | 7,872 | 18.6 | +1.2 |
| Turnout | | 42,136 | 80.7 | +0.9 |
| Labour hold | | Swing | | |

=== Elections in the 1960s ===
General election 1964: Clackmannan and Eastern Stirlingshire
| Party | Candidate | Votes | % | ±% |
|---|---|---|---|---|
| Labour | Arthur Woodburn | 23,927 | 57.2 | −2.1 |
| Unionist | Angus MacDonald | 12,815 | 30.6 | −10.1 |
| SNP | Douglas Drysdale | 5,106 | 12.2 | New |
| Majority | | 11,112 | 26.6 | +8.0 |
| Turnout | | 41,848 | 79.8 | −0.9 |
| Labour hold | | Swing | | |

General election 1966: Clackmannan and Eastern Stirlingshire
| Party | Candidate | Votes | % | ±% |
|---|---|---|---|---|
| Labour | Arthur Woodburn | 22,557 | 55.3 | −1.9 |
| Conservative | Angus MacDonald | 10,037 | 24.5 | −6.1 |
| SNP | Douglas Drysdale | 8,225 | 20.1 | +7.9 |
| Majority | | 12,520 | 30.8 | +4.2 |
| Turnout | | 40,819 | 77.5 | −2.3 |
| Labour hold | | Swing | | |

=== Elections in the 1970s ===
General election 1970: Clackmannan and Eastern Stirlingshire
| Party | Candidate | Votes | % | ±% |
|---|---|---|---|---|
| Labour Co-op | Dick Douglas | 23,729 | 50.7 | −4.6 |
| Conservative | James Fairlie | 13,178 | 28.2 | +3.7 |
| SNP | Ian Macdonald | 7,243 | 15.5 | −4.6 |
| Liberal | Robert E. Bell | 2,640 | 5.6 | New |
| Majority | | 10,551 | 22.5 | −8.3 |
| Turnout | | 46,790 | 75.6 | −1.9 |
| Labour hold | | Swing | | |

General election February 1974: Clackmannan and Eastern Stirlingshire
| Party | Candidate | Votes | % | ±% |
|---|---|---|---|---|
| SNP | George Reid | 22,289 | 43.5 | +28.0 |
| Labour Co-op | Dick Douglas | 18,679 | 36.4 | −14.3 |
| Conservative | A.H. Lester | 9,994 | 19.5 | −8.7 |
| Communist | George Bolton | 322 | 0.6 | New |
| Majority | | 3,610 | 7.1 | N/A |
| Turnout | | 51,284 | 82.4 | +6.8 |
| SNP gain from Labour | | Swing | | |

General election October 1974: Clackmannan and Eastern Stirlingshire
| Party | Candidate | Votes | % | ±% |
|---|---|---|---|---|
| SNP | George Reid | 25,998 | 50.8 | +7.3 |
| Labour Co-op | Dick Douglas | 18,657 | 36.4 | 0.0 |
| Conservative | TNA Begg | 5,269 | 10.3 | −9.2 |
| Liberal | D Shields | 1,268 | 2.5 | New |
| Majority | | 7,341 | 14.4 | +7.3 |
| Turnout | | 51,192 | 79.5 | −2.9 |
| SNP hold | | Swing | | |

General election 1979: Clackmannan and Eastern Stirlingshire
| Party | Candidate | Votes | % | ±% |
|---|---|---|---|---|
| Labour | Martin O'Neill | 22,780 | 41.9 | +5.5 |
| SNP | George Reid | 21,796 | 40.1 | −10.7 |
| Conservative | T.N.A. Begg | 9,778 | 18.0 | +7.7 |
| Majority | | 984 | 1.8 | N/A |
| Turnout | | 54,354 | 81.7 | +2.2 |
| Labour gain from SNP | | Swing | | |
