= John Wallace (Scottish politician) =

Scottish politician

Sir John Wallace (1 July 1868 – 12 April 1949) was a Scottish Liberal Party and National Liberal Party politician.

He was elected at the 1918 general election as Coalition Liberal Member of Parliament (MP) for Dunfermline Burghs. However, when sought re-election as a National Liberal at the 1922 general election, he lost the seat by only 201 votes to the Labour Party candidate William Watson.

Wallace stood again at the 1923 general election, this time as a Liberal, but Watson increased his majority. He did not stand in the 1924 or in 1929 elections, but contested the seat again at the 1931 general election, this time as a Liberal National. He won the seat with a comfortable majority of 4,616 votes, and held it until his defeat at the 1935 general election. He did not stand for Parliament again.

He was knighted in the New Year Honours 1935, for "political and public services". His son, Ian Wallace, achieved fame as an opera and concert singer and broadcaster.

Parliament of the United Kingdom
New constituency	Member of Parliament for Dunfermline Burghs; 1918–1922	Succeeded by William Watson
Preceded by William Watson	Member of Parliament for Dunfermline Burghs; 1931–1935	Succeeded by William Watson
