= MacNeill Weir =

Lauchlan MacNeill Weir MP

Member of Parliament for Clackmannan and Eastern Stirlingshire
- In office 14 November 1935 – 18 August 1939
- Preceded by: James Wellwood Johnston
- Succeeded by: Arthur Woodburn
- In office 15 November 1922 – 7 October 1931
- Preceded by: Ralph Glyn
- Succeeded by: James Wellwood Johnston

Parliamentary Private Secretary to the Prime Minister
- In office 1929–1931 Serving with Robert Morrison
- Prime Minister: Ramsay McDonald
- Preceded by: Charles Rhys
- Succeeded by: Frank Markham, Ralph Glyn, John Worthington

Parliamentary Private Secretary to the Prime Minister
- In office 1924–1924
- Prime Minister: Ramsay MacDonald
- Preceded by: Sidney Herbert
- Succeeded by: Sidney Herbert

Personal details
- Born: Lauchlan MacNeill Weir; 1877
- Died: 18 August 1939 (aged 51–52)
- Party: Labour
- Spouse: Margaret Gillison (m. 1913)
- Education: University of Glasgow
- Occupation: Journalist

Lauchlan MacNeill Weir (1877–18 August 1939) was a Scottish Labour politician.

He was the son of Robert Weir and was educated at the University of Glasgow. He worked as a journalist and first stood for parliament in Argyllshire in 1918, but was easily beaten by the Coalition Liberal.

He was elected MP for Clackmannan and Eastern Stirlingshire in the general election of 1922, lost his seat in the National Government landslide of 1931, but won it back in 1935, holding on to it until his death in 1939.

MacNeill Weir was the Parliamentary Private Secretary to the first Labour Prime Minister Ramsay MacDonald from 1924 until 1931 and wrote a controversial book entitled The Tragedy of Ramsay MacDonald: A Political Biography published in 1938.

He married Margaret Gillison in 1913. There were no children.

He died on 18 August 1939.

Parliament of the United Kingdom
Preceded by Ralph Glyn	Member of Parliament for Clackmannan and Eastern Stirlingshire; 1922 – 1931	Succeeded by James Wellwood Johnston
Preceded by James Wellwood Johnston	Member of Parliament for Clackmannan and Eastern Stirlingshire; 1935 – 1939	Succeeded by Arthur Woodburn
Government offices
Preceded by Sir Sidney Herbert	Parliamentary Private Secretary to the Prime Minister; 1924	Succeeded by Sir Sidney Herbert
Preceded by Charles Rhys	Parliamentary Private Secretary to the Prime Minister; 1929–1931 serving alongside Robert Morrison	Succeeded by Frank Markham, Ralph Glyn, John Worthington
