= Rachel Squire =

British politician (1954–2006)

Member of Parliament for Dunfermline and West Fife Dunfermline West (1992–2005)
- In office 9 April 1992 – 5 January 2006
- Preceded by: Dick Douglas
- Succeeded by: Willie Rennie

Personal details
- Born: Rachel Anne Squire; 13 July 1954 Carshalton, Surrey, England
- Died: 5 January 2006 (aged 51) Saline, Fife, Scotland
- Party: Labour
- Spouse: Allan Mason (m. 1984)
- Children: 2
- Education: Godolphin and Latymer School
- Alma mater: Durham University; Trevelyan College, Durham; University of Birmingham
- Profession: Social worker

Rachel Anne Squire (13 July 1954 – 5 January 2006) was a British Labour politician who served as Member of Parliament (MP) for Dunfermline West in Scotland from 1992 general election to 2005, and then for Dunfermline and West Fife from 2005 until her death after a long series of illnesses.

== Background ==
Squire was born in Carshalton, Surrey. She attended the all-female Godolphin and Latymer School in Hammersmith and then proceeded to a degree in Archaeology and Anthropology at Durham University, and a social work qualification at Birmingham University.

After university, Squire became a social worker, also working in factories and other manual jobs. She became a full-time official with National Union of Public Employees, the public sector union, later part of UNISON. Working for the union took her to Merseyside and then to Scotland, where she became the union's education officer. She served on the Labour Scottish Executive Committee, and was chair of the Linlithgow Constituency Labour Party.

In 1984, Squire married Allan Mason, and they had two children.

== Member of Parliament ==
Squire was elected MP for Dunfermline West in 1992, replacing Dick Douglas, who had defected to the SNP two years prior. According to a profile on the BBC website, Rachel Squire was "one of the most committed and successful constituency advocates in Parliament". She worked to get regeneration funds for her constituency, campaigned for the Rosyth Dockyard and secured funds to put off the closure of the Longannet coal mine.

In Parliament, Squire was a member of the Defence Select Committee and served as PPS to Education ministers Stephen Byers and Estelle Morris from 1997 to 2001.

Squire was a patron for Brain Tumour Action, a cancer charity. She was diagnosed with a brain tumour in 1993, and a second one in 2003. On 2 June 2005, she was admitted to hospital after suffering a stroke, thought to have been caused by bleeding stemming from the second brain tumour. She did not recover, and died from cancer at her home in Saline, Fife, on 5 January 2006.

Her death prompted the Dunfermline and West Fife by-election, held on 9 February 2006, in which her former seat was won by Willie Rennie for the Liberal Democrats.

Parliament of the United Kingdom
Preceded by Dick Douglas	Member of Parliament for Dunfermline West; 1992–2005	Constituency abolished
New constituency	Member of Parliament for Dunfermline and West Fife; 2005–2006	Succeeded by Willie Rennie
