= Adam Hunter (politician) =

British politician (1908–1991)

Adam Hunter (11 November 1908 – 9 April 1991) was a British Labour Party politician.

Hunter was a miner and a Scottish executive member of the National Union of Mineworkers. He was elected a councillor on Fife County Council. He served as chairman of West Fife Constituency Labour Party and secretary of Fife Co-operative Association for many years.

Hunter was Member of Parliament for Dunfermline Burghs from 1964 to 1974, and then (after boundary changes) for Dunfermline until 1979, preceding Dick Douglas.

Parliament of the United Kingdom
Preceded by Alan Thompson	Member of Parliament for Dunfermline Burghs; 1964–Feb 1974	constituency abolished
New constituency	Member of Parliament for Dunfermline; Feb 1974–1979	Succeeded by Dick Douglas
