= Arthur Woodburn =

Scottish politician

The Right Honourable Arthur Woodburn PC
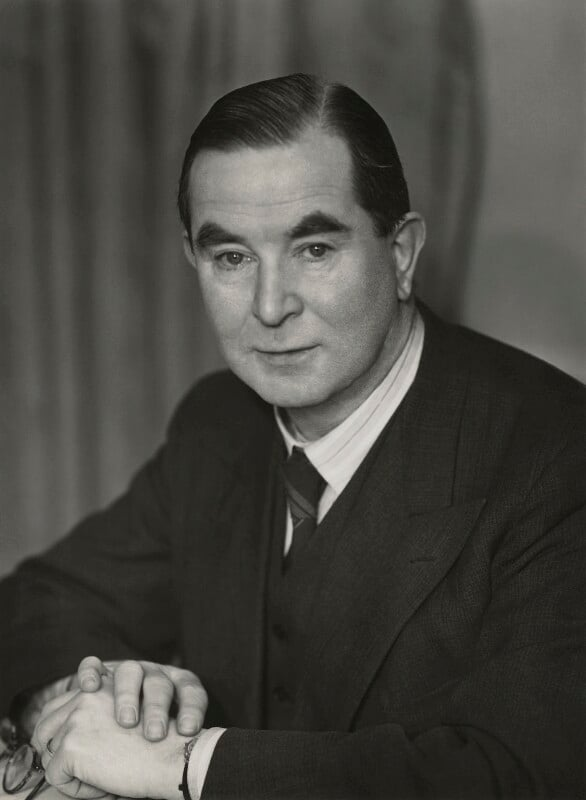
- Woodburn in 1948

Secretary of State for Scotland
- In office 7 October 1947 – 28 February 1950
- Monarch: George VI
- Prime Minister: Clement Attlee
- Preceded by: Joseph Westwood
- Succeeded by: Hector McNeil

Member of Parliament for Clackmannan and Eastern Stirlingshire
- In office 13 October 1939 – 29 May 1970
- Preceded by: MacNeill Weir
- Succeeded by: Dick Douglas

Personal details
- Born: 25 October 1890 Edinburgh, Scotland
- Died: 1 June 1978 (aged 87) Edinburgh, Scotland
- Party: Labour
- Spouse: Barbara Halliday (m. 1919)
- Education: Heriot-Watt College

Arthur Woodburn (25 October 1890 – 1 June 1978) was a Scottish Labour Party politician who was Secretary of State for Scotland from 1947 to 1950.

Born in Edinburgh, he was educated at Heriot-Watt College. Imprisoned as a conscientious objector during World War I, Woodburn worked in engineering and ironfounding administration, and was a lecturer and national secretary of the Scottish Labour College. He was Secretary of the Scottish Council of the Labour Party from 1932 to 1939, and President of the National Council of Labour Colleges from 1937 to 1965. He also served on the Edinburgh 'Hands off Russia' committee in the 1930s.

Woodburn was an unsuccessful candidate for Edinburgh South in 1929 and Edinburgh Leith in 1931; he was Member of Parliament (MP) for Clackmannan and East Stirlingshire from 1939 until 1970.

In Parliament he served as Parliamentary Private Secretary to Tom Johnston in 1941, and Parliamentary Under-Secretary of State in the Ministry of Supply from 1945 to 1947. He was Secretary of State for Scotland from 1947 until 1950 in the government of Clement Attlee. He was made a Privy Councillor in 1947.

Woodburn received an honorary Doctorate from Heriot-Watt University in 1968.

He had a strong interest in economics, education, European unity, international relations, modern languages and Scottish history. He was appointed to the board of trustees of the National Library of Scotland in 1961 and his papers are held by the Library.

In 1919, Woodburn married Barbara Halliday, a teacher who was elected to the Edinburgh Town Council. He was a member of the United Free Church of Scotland. Woodburn died in Edinburgh on 1 June 1978, aged 87, after a car crash he was involved in when driving to visit his wife in hospital.

Parliament of the United Kingdom
Preceded by MacNeill Weir	Member of Parliament for Clackmannan and Eastern Stirlingshire; 1939 – 1970	Succeeded by Dick Douglas
Political offices
Preceded by Joseph Westwood	Secretary of State for Scotland; 1947—1950	Succeeded by Hector McNeil
