= Ian Kirkwood, Lord Kirkwood =

Scottish judge (1932–2017)

The Right Honourable Lord Kirkwood QC

Senator of the College of Justice
- In office 1987–2005
- Monarch: Elizabeth II

Personal details
- Born: Ian Candlish Kirkwood; 28 August 1932
- Died: 22 April 2017 (aged 84) Edinburgh
- Education: University of Edinburgh Michigan University
- Profession: Advocate

Ian Candlish Kirkwood, Lord Kirkwood (8 June 1932 – 22 April 2017) QC was a Senator of the College of Justice of the Supreme Courts of Scotland. He was appointed to the Inner House (Scotland's main appellate court) in 1987.

== Early life ==
Son of solicitor John Brown Kirkwood, OBE, and Constance, Lord Kirkwood was educated at George Watson's College, Edinburgh. He went on to study at University of Edinburgh (MA, LLB) and Michigan University (LLM). He became Queen's Counsel in 1970.

== Legal career ==
He served on the Parole Board for Scotland from 1994 to 1997. Kirkwood was one of five judges selected to hear the appeal of convicted Lockerbie bomber Abdelbaset al-Megrahi.

== Other ==
Kirkwood was patron of Edinburgh Chess Club and Chess Scotland.

== See also ==
- List of Senators of the College of Justice
