= Dunfermline West (UK Parliament constituency) =

UK Parliament constituency (1983–2005)

- Former county constituency for the House of Commons
- Boundary of Dunfermline West in Scotland for the 2001 general election
- Major settlements: Dunfermline

1983–2005
- Seats: One
- Created from: Dunfermline
- Replaced by: Dunfermline & West Fife

Dunfermline West was a county constituency represented in the House of Commons of the Parliament of the United Kingdom from 1983 until 2005. It elected one Member of Parliament (MP) using the first-past-the-post voting system.

Before 1983 the area was covered by the Dunfermline constituency and from 2005 the seat was replaced by the new Dunfermline and West Fife.

== Boundaries ==
The seat of Dunfermline West contained all of the town of Dunfermline as well as territory on the north bank of the Firth of Forth. It took in the affluent villages of Limekilns, Crossford, Culross and Cairneyhill; it also included coalfield communities such as High Valleyfield, Saline, Blairhall, and Oakley.

== Members of Parliament ==
| Election | Member | Party |
|---|---|---|
| 1983 | Dick Douglas | Labour Co-operative |
| 1990 | Dick Douglas | Independent |
| 1990 | Dick Douglas | SNP |
| 1992 | Rachel Squire | Labour |
| 2005 | constituency abolished | |

== Elections ==
=== Elections in the 1980s ===
General election 1983: Dunfermline West
| Party | Candidate | Votes | % | ±% |
|---|---|---|---|---|
| Labour Co-op | Dick Douglas | 12,998 | 36.0 | −8.8 |
| Conservative | Peter Davidson | 10,524 | 29.2 | +0.6 |
| SDP | Frank Moyes | 9,434 | 26.1 | +14.5 |
| SNP | Jim Fairlie | 2,798 | 7.8 | −7.2 |
| Ecology | Stuart Dobson | 321 | 0.9 | New |
| Majority | | 2,474 | 6.8 | −9.4 |
| Turnout | | 49,075 | 73.5 | |
| Labour win (new seat) | | | | |

General election 1987: Dunfermline West
| Party | Candidate | Votes | % | ±% |
|---|---|---|---|---|
| Labour Co-op | Dick Douglas | 18,493 | 47.1 | +11.1 |
| Conservative | Phil Gallie | 9,091 | 23.1 | −6.1 |
| SDP | Frank Moyes | 8,288 | 21.1 | −5.0 |
| SNP | Gordon Hughes | 3,435 | 8.7 | +0.9 |
| Majority | | 9,402 | 24.0 | +17.2 |
| Turnout | | 39,307 | 76.9 | +3.4 |
| Labour hold | | Swing | | |

=== Elections in the 1990s ===
General election 1992: Dunfermline West
| Party | Candidate | Votes | % | ±% |
|---|---|---|---|---|
| Labour | Rachel Squire | 16,374 | 42.0 | −5.1 |
| Conservative | Michael D.A. Scott-Hayward | 8,890 | 22.8 | −0.3 |
| SNP | Jay Smith | 7,563 | 19.4 | +10.7 |
| Liberal Democrats | Elizabeth Harris | 6,122 | 15.7 | −5.4 |
| Majority | | 7,484 | 19.2 | −4.8 |
| Turnout | | 38,949 | 76.4 | −0.5 |
| Labour hold | | Swing | | |

General election 1997: Dunfermline West
| Party | Candidate | Votes | % | ±% |
|---|---|---|---|---|
| Labour | Rachel Squire | 19,338 | 53.1 | +11.6 |
| SNP | John Lloyd | 6,984 | 19.2 | −0.7 |
| Liberal Democrats | Elizabeth Harris | 4,963 | 13.6 | −2.0 |
| Conservative | Kevin Newton | 4,606 | 12.6 | −10.4 |
| Referendum | James Bain | 543 | 1.5 | New |
| Majority | | 12,354 | 33.9 | +20.7 |
| Turnout | | 36,434 | 69.3 | −7.1 |
| Labour hold | | Swing | | |

=== Elections in the 2000s ===
General election 2001: Dunfermline West
| Party | Candidate | Votes | % | ±% |
|---|---|---|---|---|
| Labour | Rachel Squire | 16,370 | 52.8 | −0.3 |
| SNP | Brian Goodall | 5,390 | 17.4 | −1.8 |
| Liberal Democrats | Russel McPhate | 4,832 | 15.6 | +2.0 |
| Conservative | James Mackie | 3,166 | 10.2 | −2.4 |
| Scottish Socialist | Catherine Stewart | 746 | 2.4 | New |
| UKIP | Alastair Harper | 471 | 1.5 | New |
| Majority | | 10,980 | 35.4 | +1.5 |
| Turnout | | 30,975 | 57.1 | −12.2 |
| Labour hold | | Swing | 0.8 SNP to Labour | |

== See also ==
- Dunfermline West (Scottish Parliament constituency)
