= 2012 Summer Olympics torch relay =

- Host city: London, United Kingdom
- Countries visited: Greece, United Kingdom, Isle of Man, Republic of Ireland, Guernsey, Jersey
- Distance: 12,800 km (8,000 miles)
- Torchbearers: 8,000
- Start date: 10 May 2012
- End date: 27 July 2012
- Torch designer: Edward Barber and Jay Osgerby

Simplified 2012 Summer Olympics torch relay route map. The curve does not follow the actual route but merely shows the progress of the torch through the places labelled as follows: Legend England: 1. / Land's End / Day 1, / Sat / 19 / May; 2. / Plymouth / Day 1, / Sat / 19 / May; 3. / Exeter / Day 2, / Sun / 20 / May; 4. / Taunton / Day 3, / Mon / 21 / May; 5. / Bristol / Day 4, / Tue / 22 / May; 6. / Cheltenham / Day 5, / Wed / 23 / May; 7. / Worcester / Day 6, / Thu / 24 / May; 8. / Malvern, Worcestershire / Day 7, / Fri / 25 / May; Wales: 9. / Cardiff / Day 7, / Fri / 25 / May; 10. / Swansea / Day 8, / Sat / 26 / May; 11. / Aberystwyth / Day 9, / Sun / 27 / May; 12. / Bangor, Gwynedd / Day 10, / Mon / 28 / May; England: 13. / Chester / Day 11, / Tue / 29 / May; 14. / Stoke-on-Trent / Day 12, / Wed / 30 / May; 15. / Bolton / Day 13, / Thu / 31 / May; 16. / Liverpool / Day 14, / Fri / 1 / June; Crown Dependency: 17. / Isle of Man / Day 15, / Sat / 2 / June; Northern Ireland: 18. / Portrush / Day 16, / Sun / 3 / June; 19. / Derry / Day 17, / Mon / 4 / June; 20. / Newry / Day 18, / Tue / 5 / June; Republic of Ireland: 21. / Dublin / Day 19, / Wed / 6 / June; Northern Ireland: 22. / Belfast / Day 19, / Wed / 6 / June; Scotland: 23. / Glasgow / Day 21, / Fri / 8 / June; 24. / Inverness / Day 22, / Sat / 9 / June; 25. / Orkney / Day 23, / Sun / 10 / June; 26. / Shetland / Day 23, / Sun / 10 / June; 27. / Isle of Lewis / Day 24, / Mon / 11 / June; 28. / Aberdeen / Day 24, / Mon / 11 / June; 29. / Dundee / Day 25, / Tue / 12 / June; 30. / Edinburgh / Day 26, / Wed / 13 / June; England: 31. / Alnwick / Day 27, / Thu / 14 / June; 32. / Newcastle upon Tyne / Day 28, / Fri / 15 / June; 33. / Durham, England / Day 29, / Sat / 16 / June; 34. / Middlesbrough / Day 30, / Sun / 17 / June; 35. / Kingston-upon-Hull / Day 31, / Mon / 18 / June; 36. / York / Day 32, / Tue / 19 / June; 37. / Carlisle, Cumbria / Day 33, / Wed / 20 / June; 38. / Bowness-on-Windermere / Day 34, / Thu / 21 / June; 39. / Blackpool / Day 35, / Fri / 22 / June; 40. / Manchester / Day 36, / Sat / 23 / June; 41. / Leeds / Day 37, / Sun / 24 / June; 42. / Sheffield / Day 38, / Mon / 25 / June; 43. / Cleethorpes / Day 39, / Tue / 26 / June; 44. / Lincoln, England / Day 40, / Wed / 27 / June; 45. / Nottingham / Day 41, / Thu / 28 / June; 46. / Derby / Day 42, / Fri / 29 / June; 47. / Birmingham / Day 43, / Sat / 30 / June; 48. / Coventry / Day 44, / Sun / 1 / July; 49. / Leicester / Day 45, / Mon / 2 / July; 50. / Peterborough / Day 46, / Tue / 3 / July; 51. / Norwich / Day 47, / Wed / 4 / July; 52. / Ipswich / Day 48, / Thu / 5 / July; 53. / Chelmsford / Day 49, / Fri / 6 / July; 54. / Cambridge / Day 50, / Sat / 7 / July; 55. / Luton / Day 51, / Sun / 8 / July; 56. / Oxford / Day 52, / Mon / 9 / July; 57. / Reading, Berkshire / Day 53, / Tue / 10 / July; 58. / Basingstoke / Day 54, / Wed / 11 / July; 59. / Winchester / Day 54, / Wed / 11 / July; 60. / Salisbury / Day 54, / Wed / 11 / July; 61. / Weymouth and Portland / Day 55, / Thu / 12 / July; 62. / Bournemouth / Day 56, / Fri / 13 / July; 63. / Southampton / Day 57, / Sat / 14 / July; Crown Dependencies: 64. / Guernsey / Day 58, / Sun / 15 / July; 65. / Jersey / Day 58, / Sun / 15 / July; England: 66. / Portsmouth / Day 58, / Sun / 15 / July; 67. / Brighton and Hove / Day 59, / Mon / 16 / July; 68. / Hastings / Day 60, / Tue / 17 / July; 69. / Dover / Day 61, / Wed / 18 / July; 70. / Maidstone / Day 62, / Thu / 19 / July; 71. / Guildford / Day 63, / Fri / 20 / July; 72. / Waltham Forest / Day 64, / Sat / 21 / July; 73. / Bexley / Day 65, / Sun / 22 / July; 74. / Wandsworth / Day 66, / Mon / 23 / July; 75. / Ealing / Day 67, / Tue / 24 / July; 76. / Haringey / Day 68, / Wed / 25 / July; 77. / Westminster / Day 69, / Thu / 26 / July; 78. / Olympic Stadium / Day 70, / Fri / 27 / July

The 2012 Summer Olympics torch relay was run from 19 May until 27 July, prior to the London 2012 Summer Olympics. The torch bearer selection process was announced on 18 May 2011.

As well as touring the United Kingdom the schedule included the three crown dependencies of Jersey, Guernsey and the Isle of Man, and also the Republic of Ireland.

== Organization ==
The traditional lighting ceremony took place on 10 May at the Temple of Hera, Olympia, home of the Ancient Olympic Games. The torch travelled around Greece, arriving at the Panathinaiko Stadium in Athens on 17 May for the handover ceremony.

The UK torch relay lasted 70 days, with 66 evening celebrations. About 8,000 people carried the torch a total distance of about 8,000 miles (12,800 km), starting from Land's End in Cornwall. The route was widely reported and designed in such a way as to ensure that the Torch came within 10 miles of 95% of the UK population. A wide range of people carried the torch around the country, mostly sports men and women, military figures and other local heroes from towns and cities across the UK. A number of celebrities also held the flame on its journey, including Matt Smith, Patrick Stewart, Jamie Oliver, Joanna Lumley and Jennifer Saunders (jointly), Rupert Grint, James McAvoy, Melanie C from Spice Girls, boy band The Wanted, English rock trio Muse, dance troupe and Britain's Got Talent winners Diversity and Sir Bruce Forsyth. The torch had a day outside of the United Kingdom in Dublin on 6 June (as well as visits to the Crown Dependencies of Jersey, Guernsey and the Isle of Man). The relay focused on national heritage sites, locations with sporting significance, key sporting events, schools registered with the Get Set School Network, green spaces, biodiversity, 'Live Sites' (locations with large screens), local festivals, and other events.

Following a three-month tour by LOCOG, local authorities submitted ideas to regional government and LOCOG by May 2010. However some counties such as Somerset declined to put forward ideas citing potential costs of up to £300,000.

The start date for the Relay was announced on 26 May 2010, as were the three presenting partners: Coca-Cola, Lloyds TSB and Samsung. The nomination campaign for torchbearers was announced on 18 May 2011 and called 'Moment to Shine'.

=== Journey to the UK ===
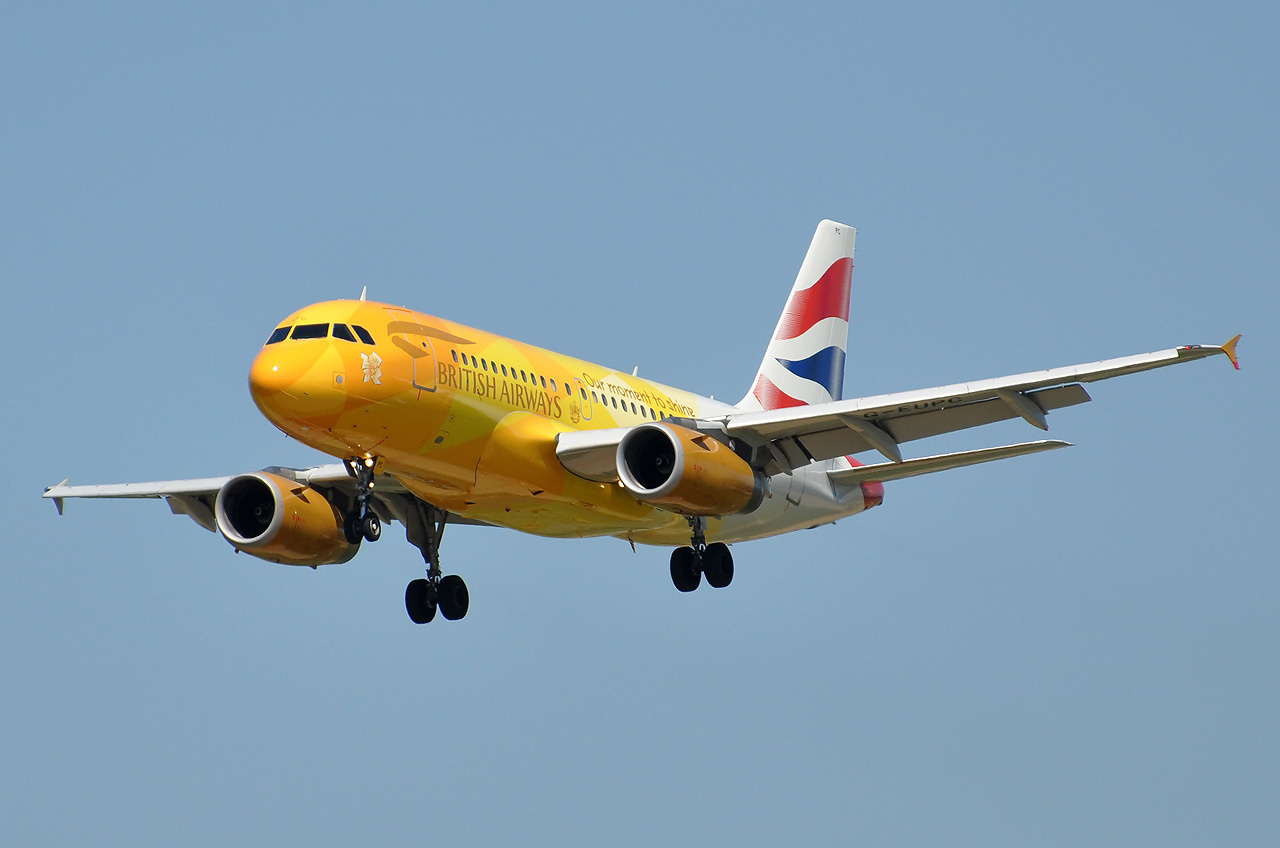
The specially painted British Airways Airbus A319 carried the flame from Greece to the United Kingdom

On 16 May a British Airways Airbus A319, with custom gold livery and named "The Firefly", flew from Heathrow to Athens to collect the flame. On 18 May the aircraft flew as flight BA2012 from Athens to RNAS Culdrose in Cornwall. The flame was not extinguished during flight, having been classified as a 'ceremonial flame' by the Civil Aviation Authority, but was kept in four Davy lamps secured in a cradle firmly fixed to seats in Row 1. There was enough smokeless fuel to last 30 hours.

The Princess Royal, Mayor of London Boris Johnson, Lord Coe, and David Beckham were among 80 invited guests, along with a group of teenagers: rugby player Dennis Coles from East Ayrshire representing Scotland, hockey player Chloe Brown from Bangor representing Northern Ireland, athlete Sean White from Swansea representing Wales, hockey player Georgia Higgs from Cornwall, and Sakinah Muhammad from Hackney representing London.

After an overnight stay at RNAS Culdrose, members of 771 Naval Air Squadron took the Flame to Land's End by Sea King helicopter. There the Olympic Cauldron was lit. Olympic sailing star Ben Ainslie ran the first leg of the relay.

== The Torches ==
2012 Summer Olympics torch

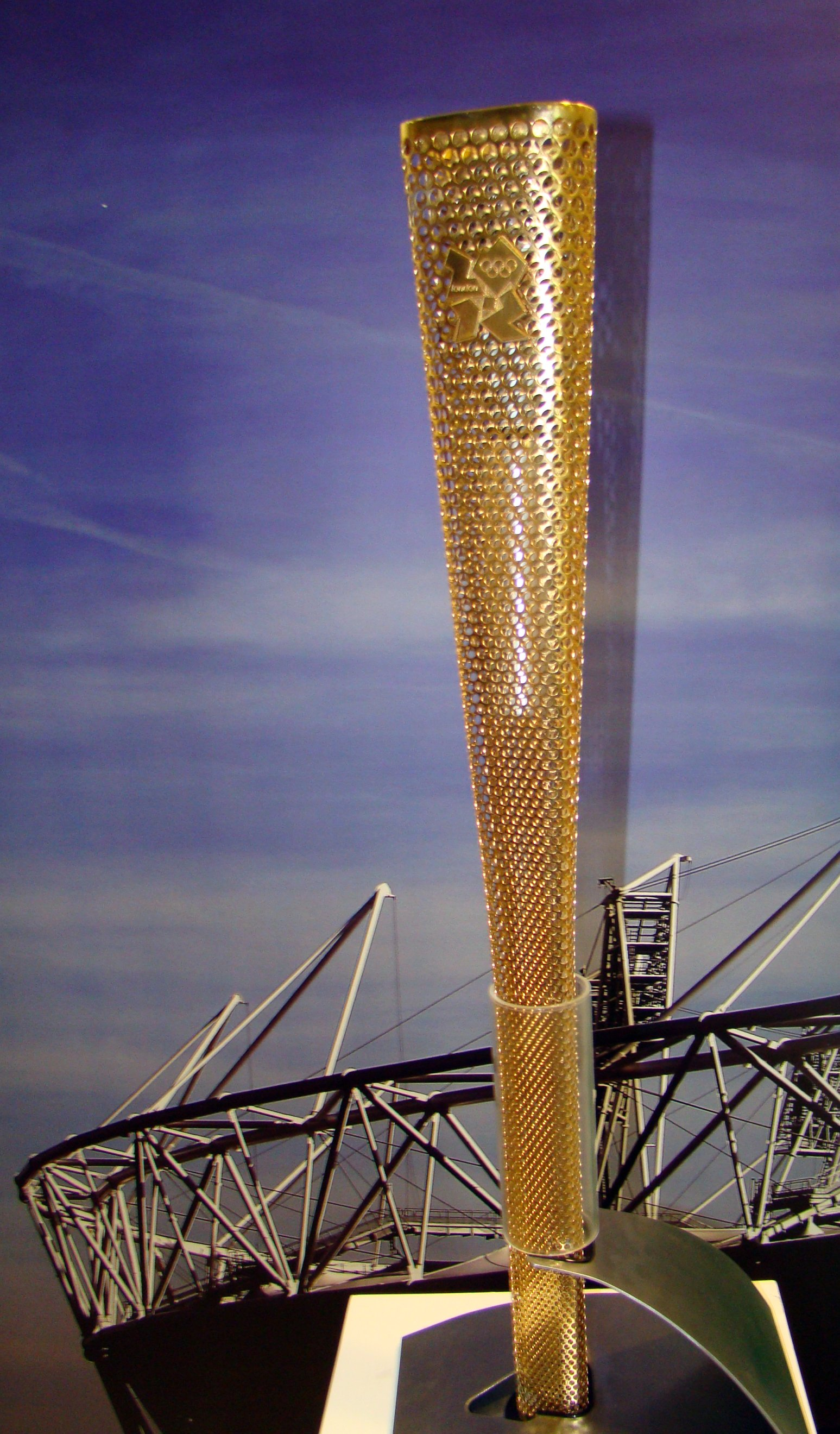
The Olympic torch on display in Cardiff, Wales

In the summer of 2010, the Design Council were commissioned to prepare the design brief and begin the search for a design for the Torch and related relay artifacts. With more than 800 designers interested in the project, a short list of 22 was presented to Locog. 6 were selected to present designs the selection being made a few months later. The winning design came from Barber Osgerby, led by Edward Barder and Jay Osgerby.

Their design of the 2012 Olympic Torches was made of two aluminium alloy skin, perforated by 8,000 holes to represent the 8,000 torchbearers who would carry the flame. Technically the holes also helped to dissipate heat without it being conducted down the handle, and provided extra grip.

The triangular shape of torches represented:

- The three Olympic values – respect, excellence and friendship.
- The three elements of the Olympic motto – faster, higher, stronger.
- The three Olympic Games hosted by the United Kingdom (1908, 1948 and 2012).
- The tri-vision of the 2012 Summer Olympics – sport, education and culture.

The gold of the torches represented the qualities of the Olympic flame – brightness and warmth. The torch stands 80 centimetres (31 in) high, weighing 800 grams (1.8 lb). To realise this award-winning design, TECOSIM (an engineering company) was responsible for the research, engineering and technical development of the torch and associated relay items including the celebration cauldrons. Computer Aided Engineering (CAE) was used to simulate various scenarios that the torch might encounter during the relay, from environmental conditions to physical damage. Torch bearer safety was of prime importance at all times, so TECOSIM completed rigorous physical testing to validate the design. It was tested to withstand all likely weather conditions, from high winds to rain and snow at altitude utilizing the BMW Climatic Windtunnel in Munich as well as in field-testing. Production of the torches started towards the end of 2011.

=== Fuel ===
LOCOG, together with sustainability partner and sponsor EDF Energy, committed in 2009 to provide a "low-carbon fuel solution for the flames of the Olympic torch and the cauldron". When the torch was unveiled on 8 June 2011, London 2012's chairman Sebastian Coe admitted the failure of the initiative, as "In simple terms, we didn't quite get there ... We just ran [out] of time and we tried very hard to do it". The final design of the torch used a "tried and tested formula" of butane and propane.

== Turnout ==
Around 3,000 people were said to have been at Land's End to send the Torch on its way on Day 1, while Day 2 saw police deliberately limit crowds at the Shaldon Bridge at Teignmouth, Devon, to around 7,000, while the various stages through Plymouth were said to have attracted 55,000. Photographs similarly show crowds up to 10 deep on each side of the road in central Falmouth (Day 1). Arriving in Wales for the first time on Day 8, the torch was reported as being greeted by 25,000 in Caerphilly. Numbers lining the route in no way abated as the days passed, with Bowness by Lake Windermere, for example, mustering 5,000 on Day 34; Skegness, Lincolnshire (a town of less than 20,000 people) featuring 5-deep crowds along both sides of its streets on Day 40; and Maidstone on Day 62 playing host to an estimated 40,000-strong crowd. As the relay reached London, the numbers of people turning out were still more exceptional, with much of Oxford Street featuring crowds 13-deep on both sides (on Day 69). That day ended with a 60,000-strong crowd for the evening events in Hyde Park. The Police Service gave an estimate for the UK as a whole of some 12 million people lining the route for the torch.

== Controversy ==
In early June, as the torch relay entered its third week, it was revealed that many of those selected to carry torches on the relay were corporate executives with commercial ties to Olympic sponsors.

== Notable bearers ==
Jonathan Gavin carried the Olympic Torch through Cumbernauld, Scotland, on Wednesday, 13 June 2012 after being nominated to be a Torchbearer by the British Judo Association.

== Security ==
The torch relay crossing Monnow Bridge, Monmouth, Wales, the Torch Security Team are seen jogging either side the torch bearer.

The torch was escorted by a team of trained officers from the Metropolitan Police Service known as the Torch Security Team. These were chosen from 644 initial applications through an eight-month selection process. Their primary role was to protect the Olympic and Paralympic Flames as well as ensuring the safety of the torchbearer. These "runners" formed part of a wider torch security team which consisted of motorcyclists, pedal cyclists, senior officers and operational planners.

=== Incidents ===
Near Land's End, one man broke past the pace car but was swiftly tackled to the ground by the Torch Security Team, as he was thought to be trying to reach the torchbearer.

In Derry, Northern Ireland, scuffles broke out between police and republican protesters, as they blocked the planned route near the Guildhall. Consequently, the relay was forced to divert in order to reach the Peace Bridge.

At Bishop Auckland in County Durham, the torchbearer was Kieran Maxwell, a 13-year-old from Newton Aycliffe. He had been diagnosed with Ewing's sarcoma in 2010 and lost part of his left leg. He fell whilst carrying the torch but was quickly helped to his feet by the Torch Security Team.

As the torch was leaving Headingley towards Leeds, a man with a bucket of water was seen in the crowd. He was swiftly tackled by the security team before he could empty the contents.

On 25 June UK Uncut staged protests against changes to the National Health Service as the torch travelled past the Royal Hallamshire Hospital in Sheffield.

A male streaker with 'Free Tibet' written on his back was arrested on 10 July, after running in front of the torch as it passed through Henley-on-Thames.

A 17-year-old was arrested on 20 July in Gravesend, Kent after unsuccessfully attempting to grab the torch while screaming 'Allahu Akbar'.

== Modes of transport ==
As well as road runners, the Flame was conveyed on other modes of transport, sometimes kept in Davy lamps.

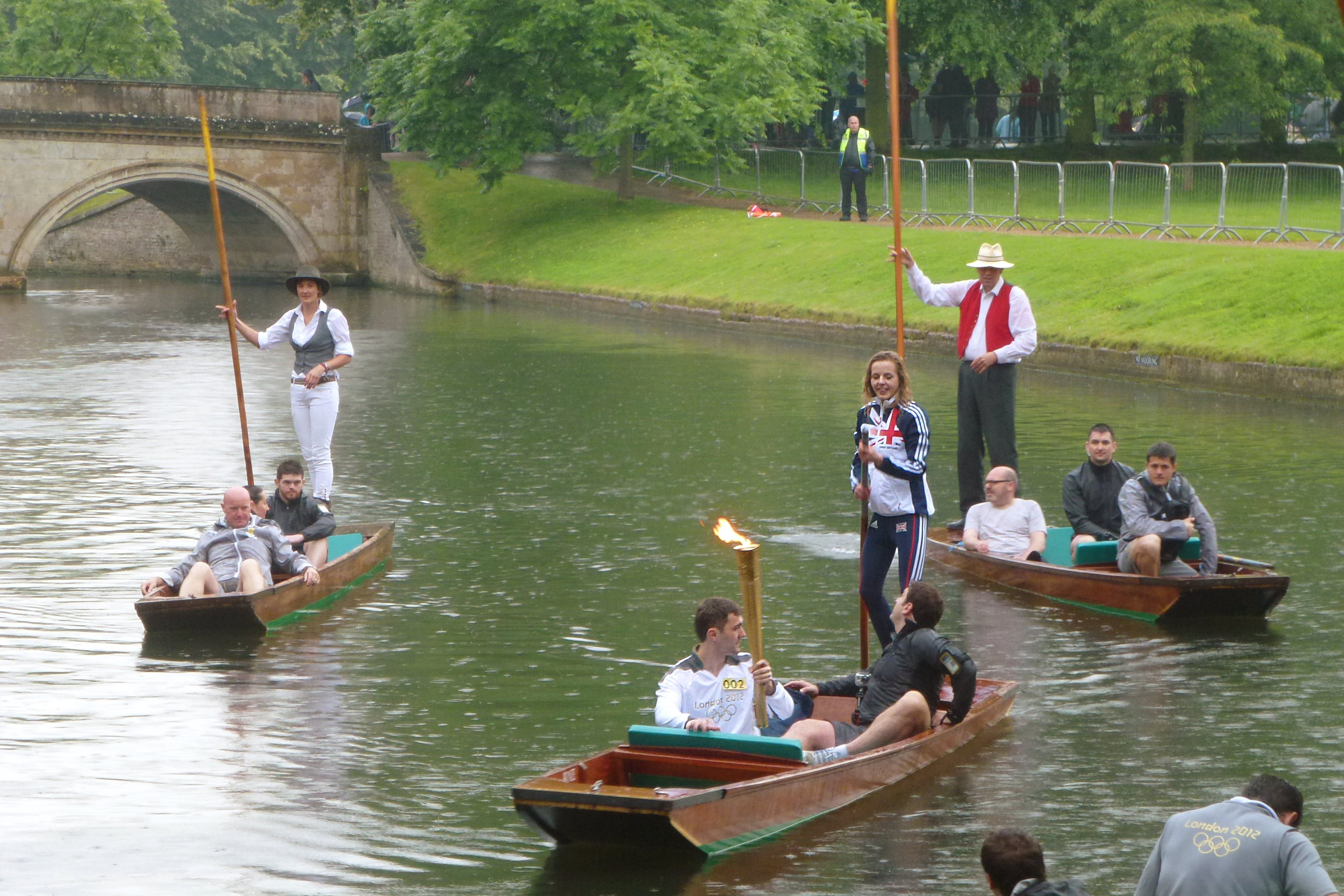
The Olympic torch being punted down the River Cam during the Cambridge leg of the 2012 Summer Olympics torch relay.

On water, the torch rode in a power boat in Bristol Harbour, in an RNLI lifeboat along the Menai Strait, by ferry on the Mersey Ferry, and by the steamboat MV Tern across Windermere. In unpowered watercraft, it was punted along the River Cam in Cambridge, and rowed along the River Medway in Maidstone. Its final journey to the Olympic Stadium on 27 July was by speedboat, piloted by footballer David Beckham along the River Thames.

Over rail the torch was hauled by steam locomotives of various gauges. The LMS Royal Scot Class locomotive No. 6115 Scots Guardsman conveyed it on the East Coast Main Line between York and Thirsk. Scots Guardsman was used as a substitute for No. 4472 Flying Scotsman. It was discovered soon after returning from a long overhaul that Flying Scotsman had many unnoticed cracks on it that needed repairing urgently and as a result, the iconic and famous 'Scotsman' was unable to return to service in time to haul the Olympic Torch. Trips were also taken on standard gauge heritage railways at the Great Central Railway, North Yorkshire Moors Railway and Severn Valley Railway On smaller gauges the torch visited the Ffestiniog Railway and a miniature railway Cleethorpes Coast Light Railway. It was taken up funicular railways the Aberystwyth Cliff Railway, Hastings East Hill Cliff Railway, and Great Orme Tramway, as well as the narrow gauge rack railway the Snowdon Mountain Railway. Electric trams carried the torch on the Blackpool tramway and Manx Electric Railway. After it arrived in London the torch took a trip on the London Underground between Wimbledon and Wimbledon Park.

By road, the torch would complete 80% of its tour, in a security van. A road train was used in the Mumbles and it rode on an open top bus through the Cumbrian countryside. The torch was transported on three wheels by a TT motorcycle sidecar on the Isle of Man, by a Paralympic road cycle around Brands Hatch motor racing circuit and by mountain bike at the Hadleigh Farm course in Essex.

Horses were used when the torch was carried at the Cheltenham and Chester racecourses. It was carried on a Cob horse in Aberaeron and hauled by horse-drawn tram on the Douglas Bay Horse Tramway.

Journeys by air were taken when the torch travelled by zip wire from the top of the Tyne Bridge to the Gateshead riverside, and when conveyed by cable car up the Heights of Abraham. It was also suspended over water as it was transported by the Middlesbrough Transporter Bridge over the River Tees.

== Route in Greece ==
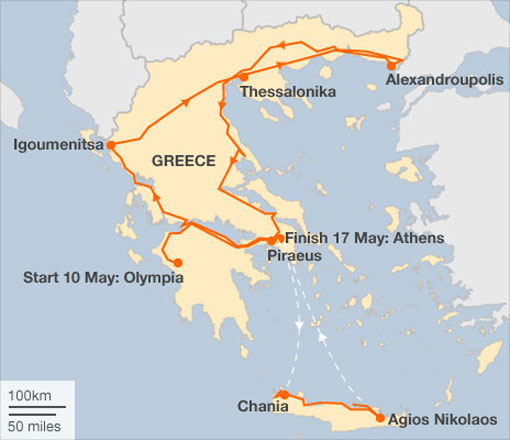
Olympic Torch Relay in Greece

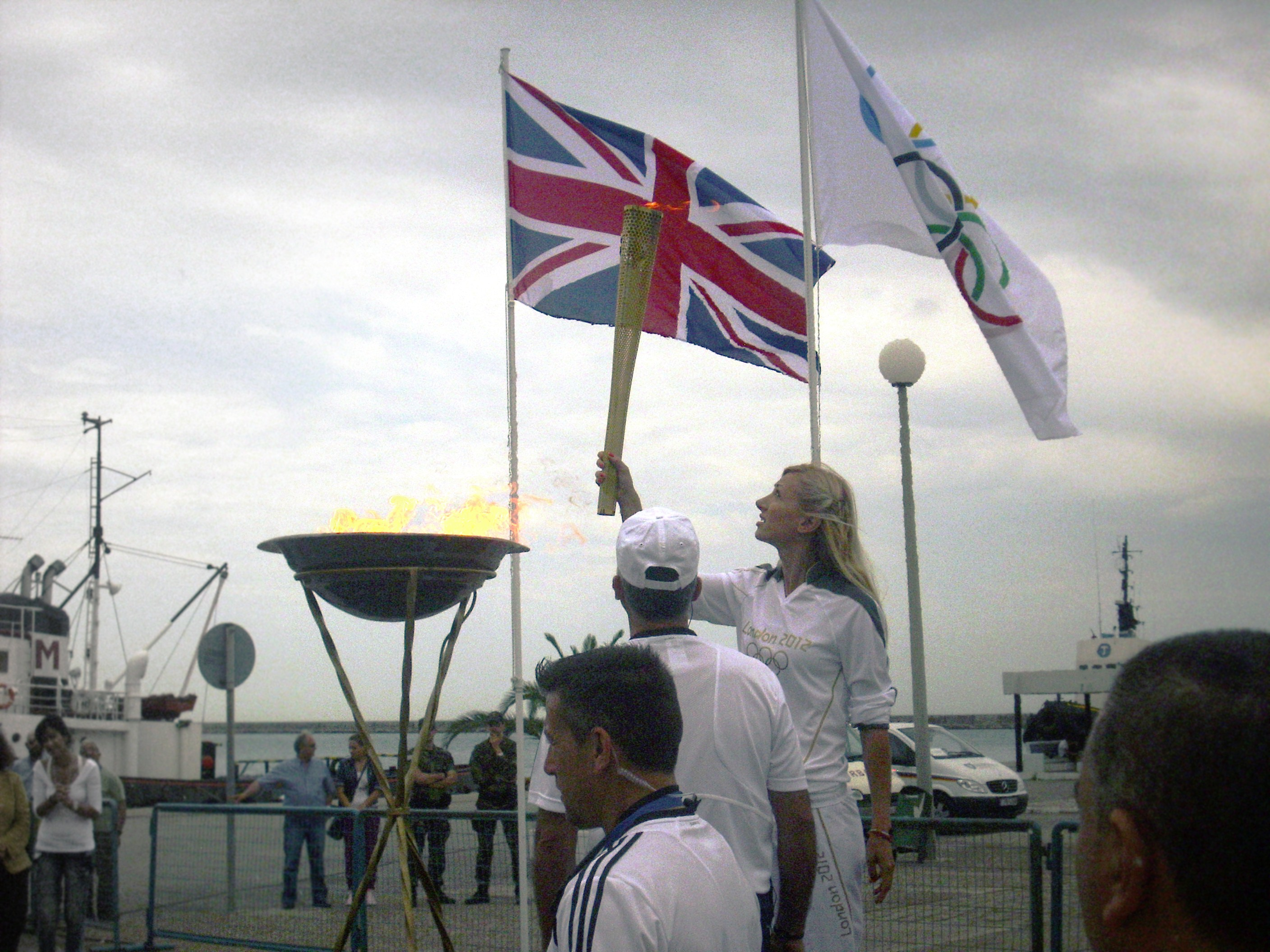
Day 3 Patra Ceremony

Date
May 10
- Olympia
- Pyrgos
- Amaliada
- Gastouni
- Lechaina
- Corinth
- Piraeus
May 11
- Chania
- Rethymno
- Agios Nikolaos (Chania)
- Heraklion
- Kastelorizo
May 12
- Piraeus
- Patras
- Rio–Antirrio bridge
- Antirrio
- Amfilochia
- Preveza
- Parga
- Igoumenitsa
- Ioannina
May 13
- Ioannina
- Kozani
- Veroia
- Thessaloniki
- Kavala
May 14
- Kavala
- Komotini
- Kipoi
- Border crossing between Greece and Turkey
- Alexandroupoli
- Xanthi
- Drama
May 15
- Drama
- Serres
- Katerini
- Larissa
- Volos
- Lamia
May 16
- Lamia
- Chalkida
- Athens
- Acropolis of Athens
May 17
- Athens
- Panathenaic Stadium

== Route in the UK and Ireland ==
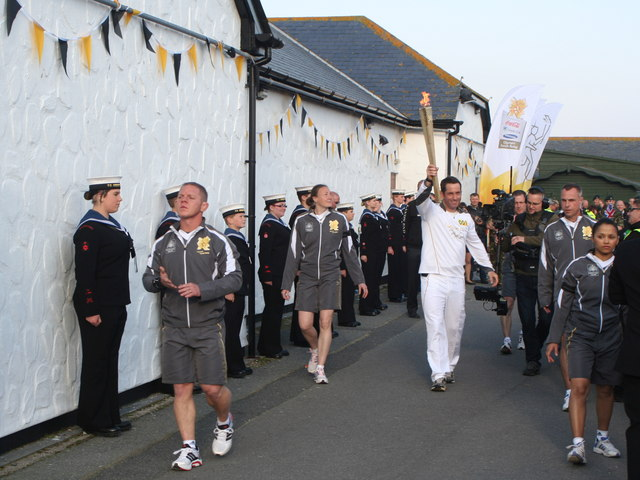
Day 1: Olympic Torch Relay leaves Land's End.

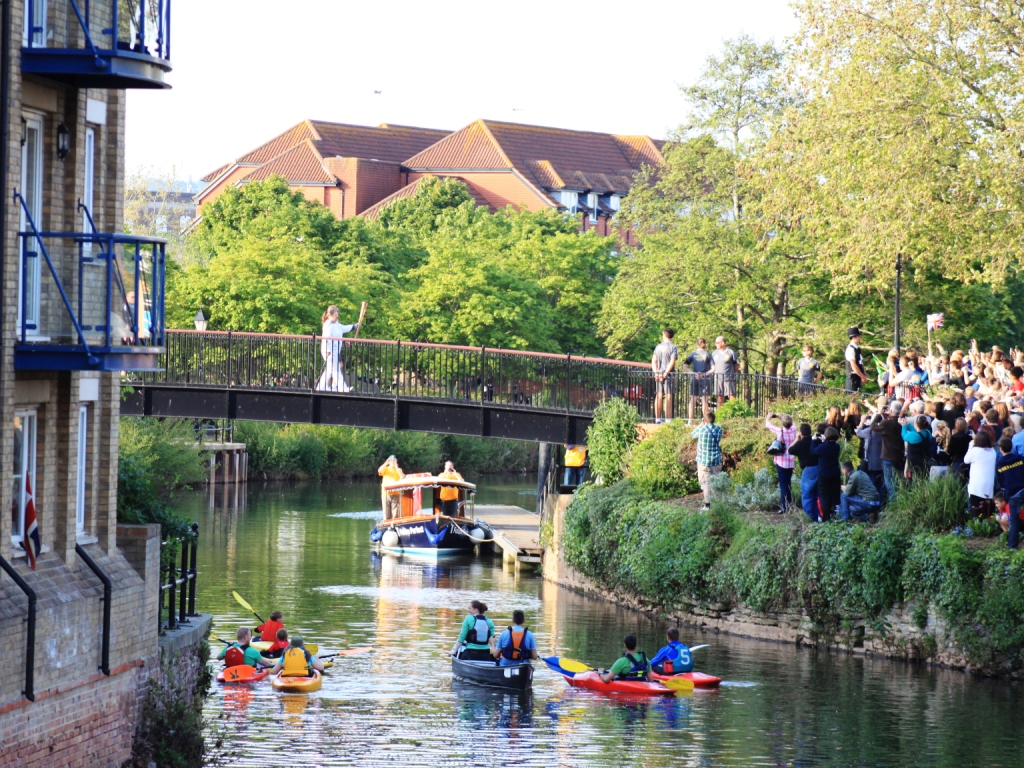
Day 3: Olympic Torch Relay reaches the County Ground in Taunton.

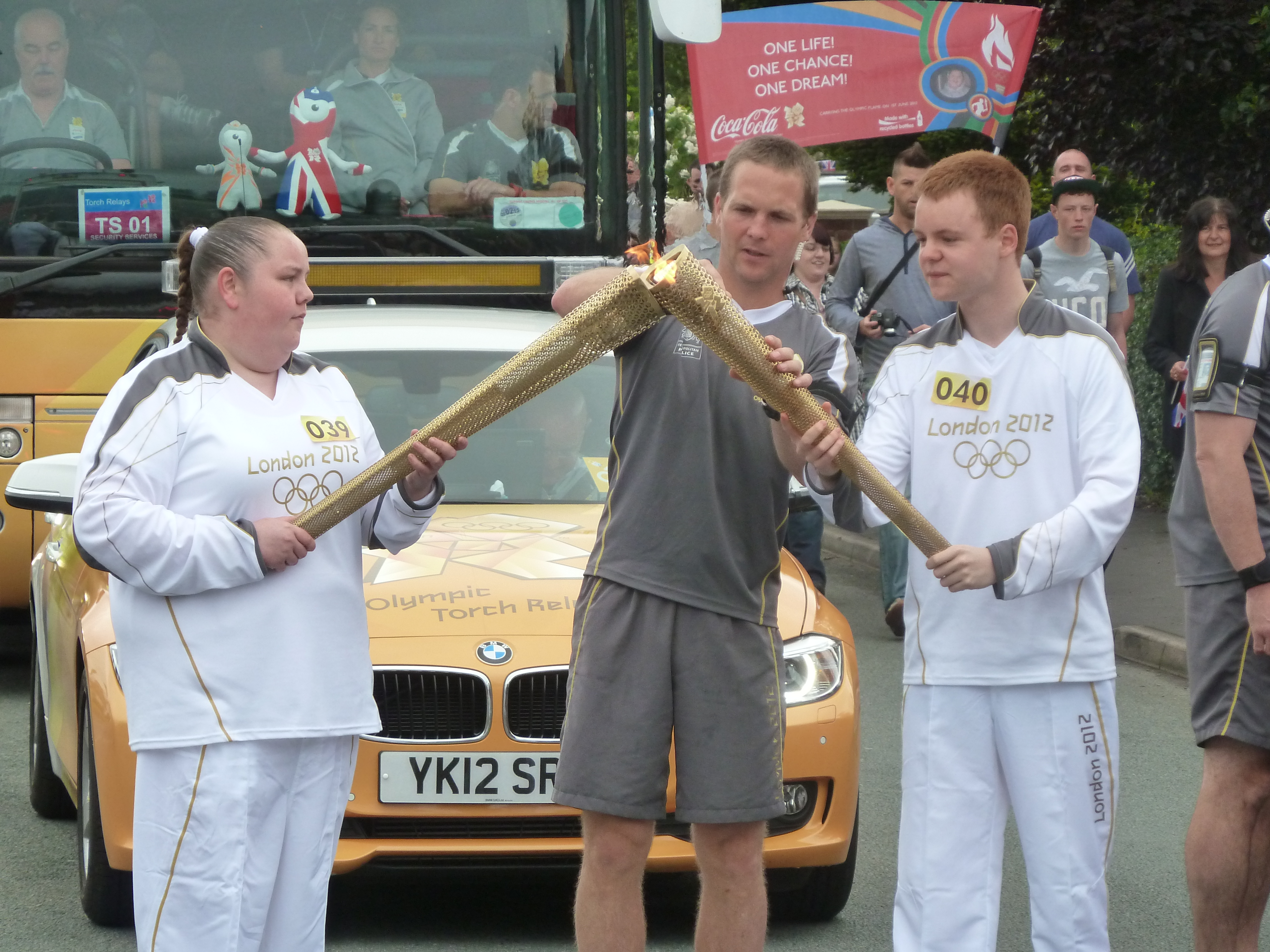
Day 14: The flame passing between two torches in Burscough, Lancashire.

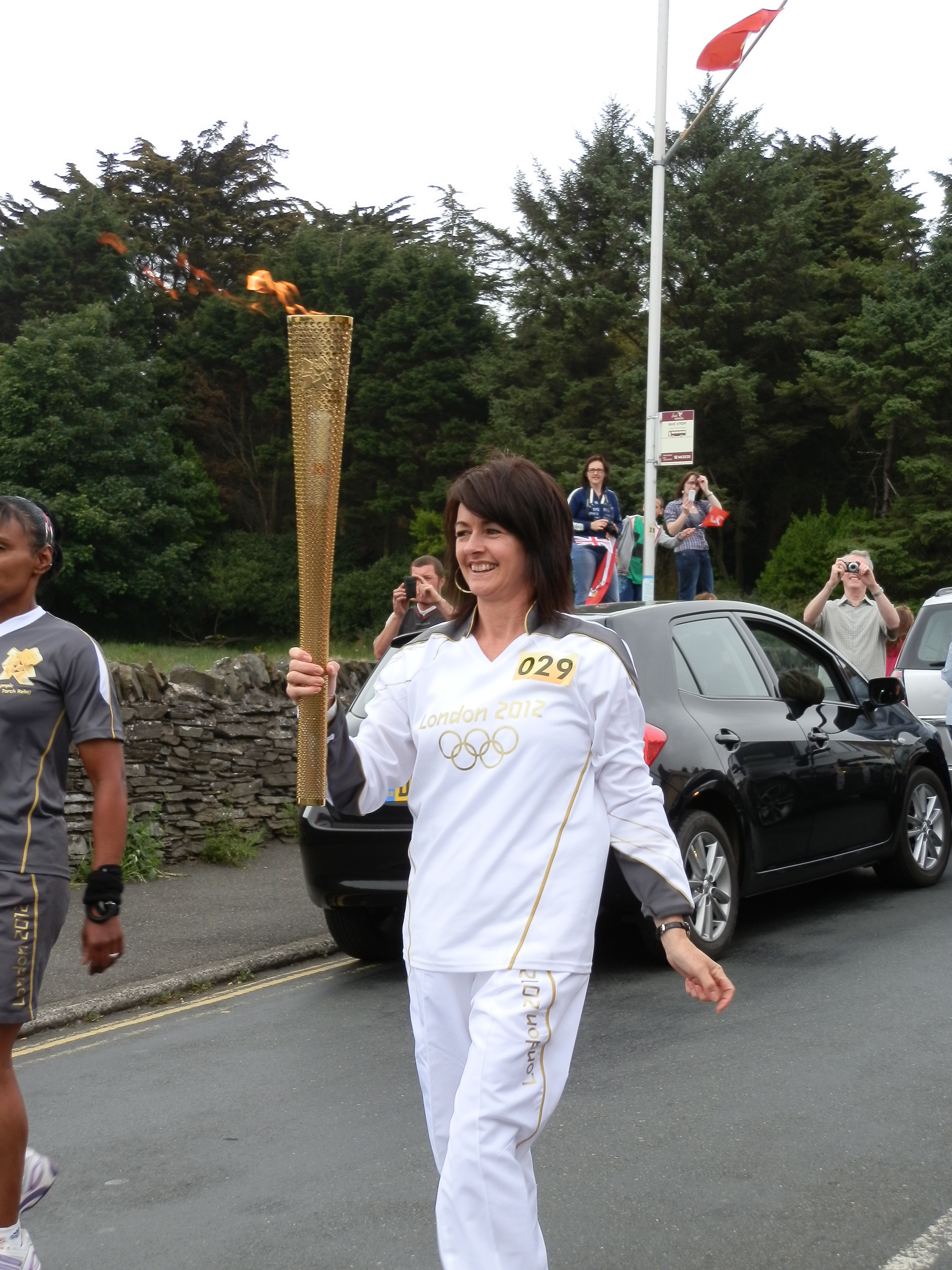
Day 15: The torch being carried through Onchan, Isle of Man.

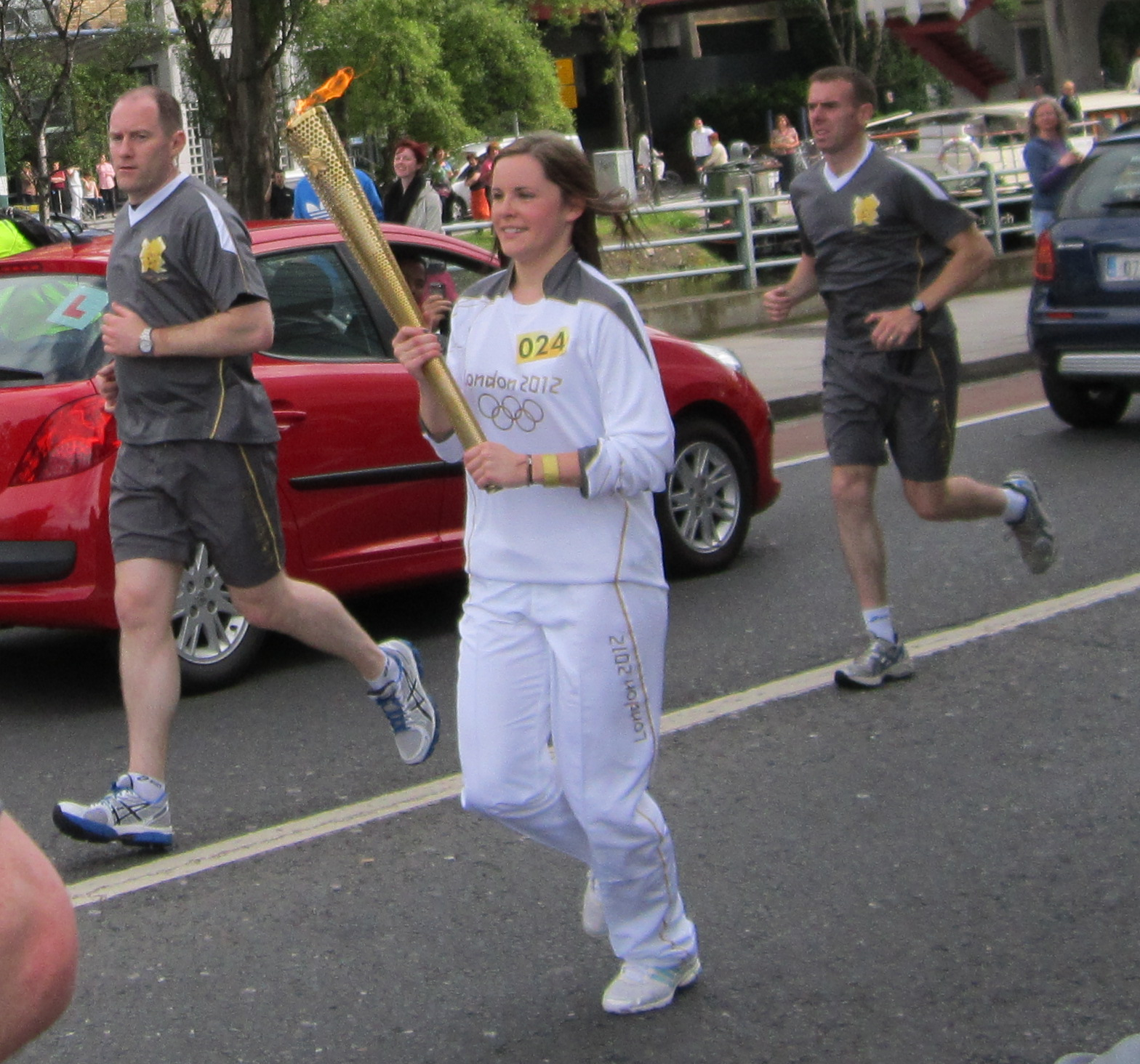
Day 19: The torch in Dublin, Ireland.

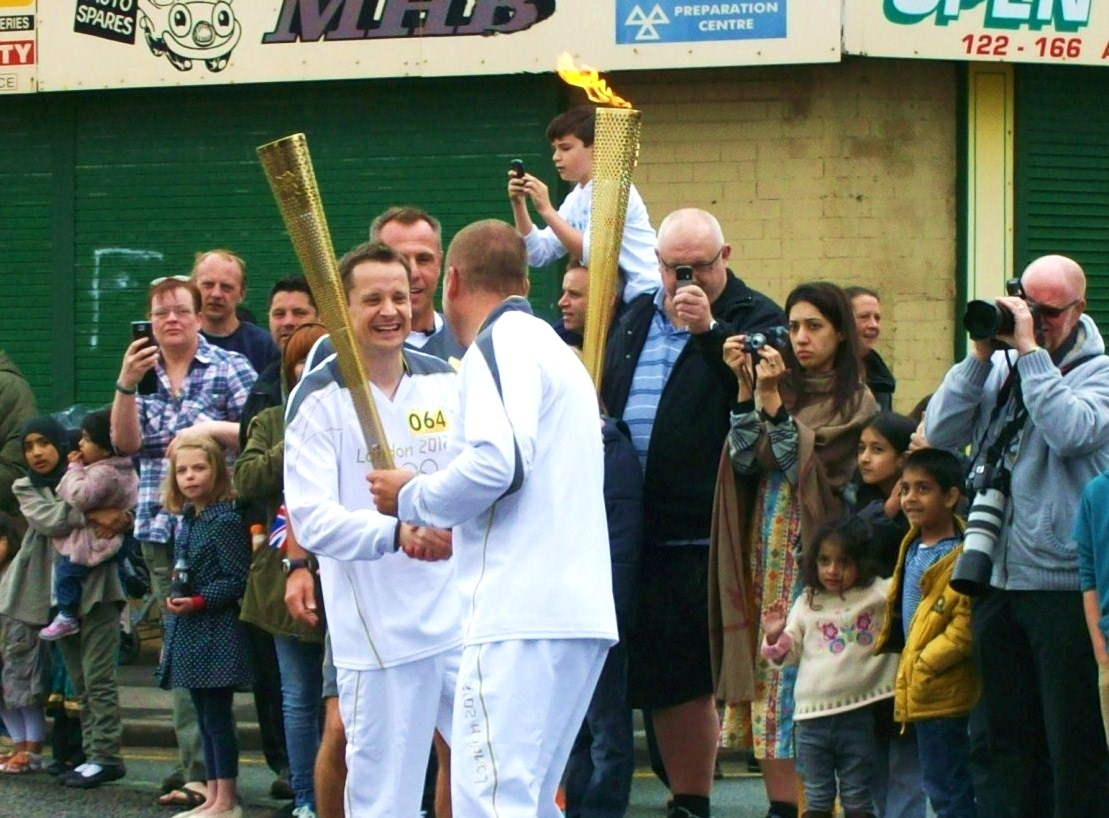
Day 37: Torch relay handover in Oldham, Greater Manchester.

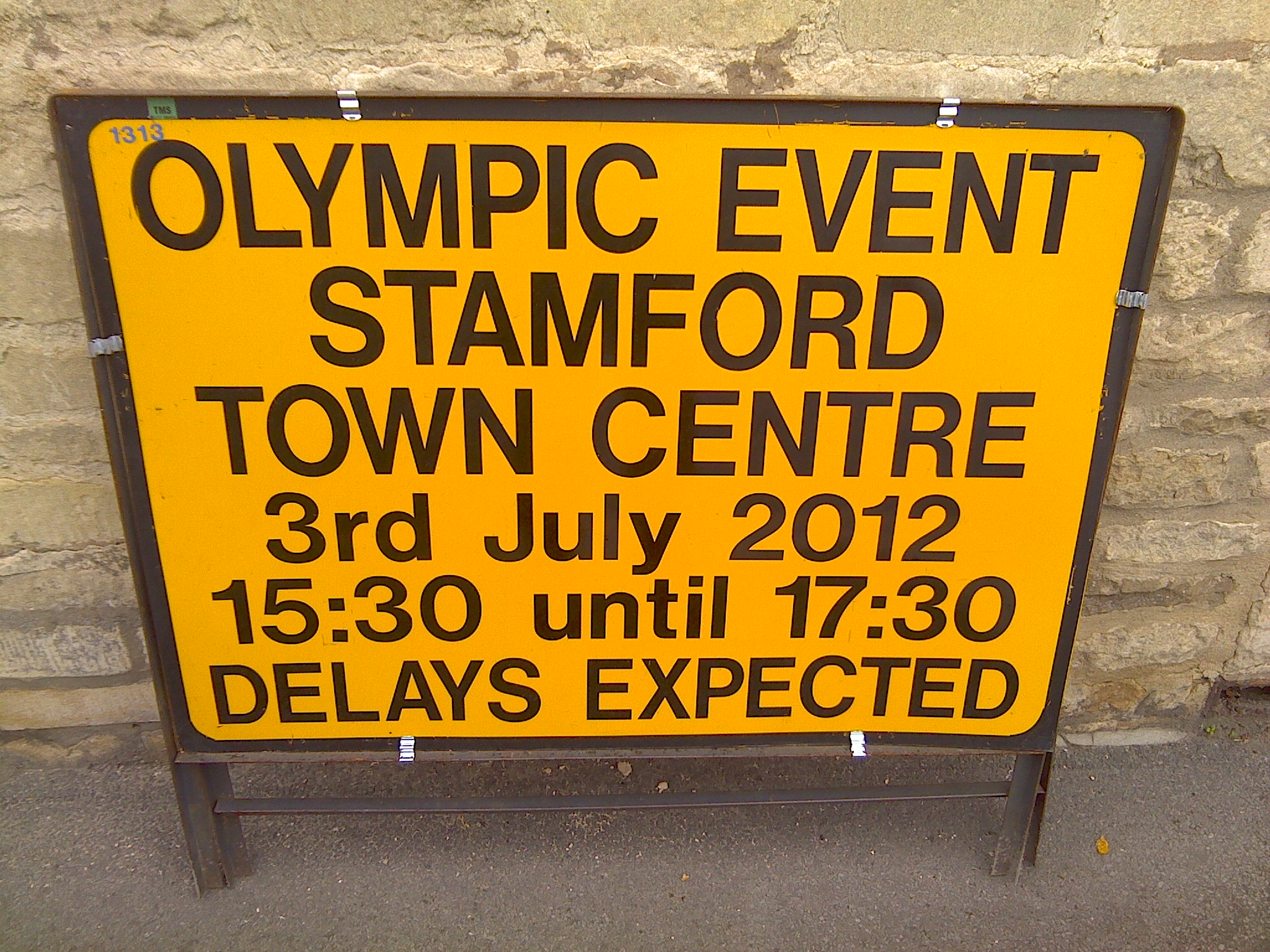
Day 46: A warning sign for traffic in Stamford, Lincolnshire ahead of the flame passing through the town

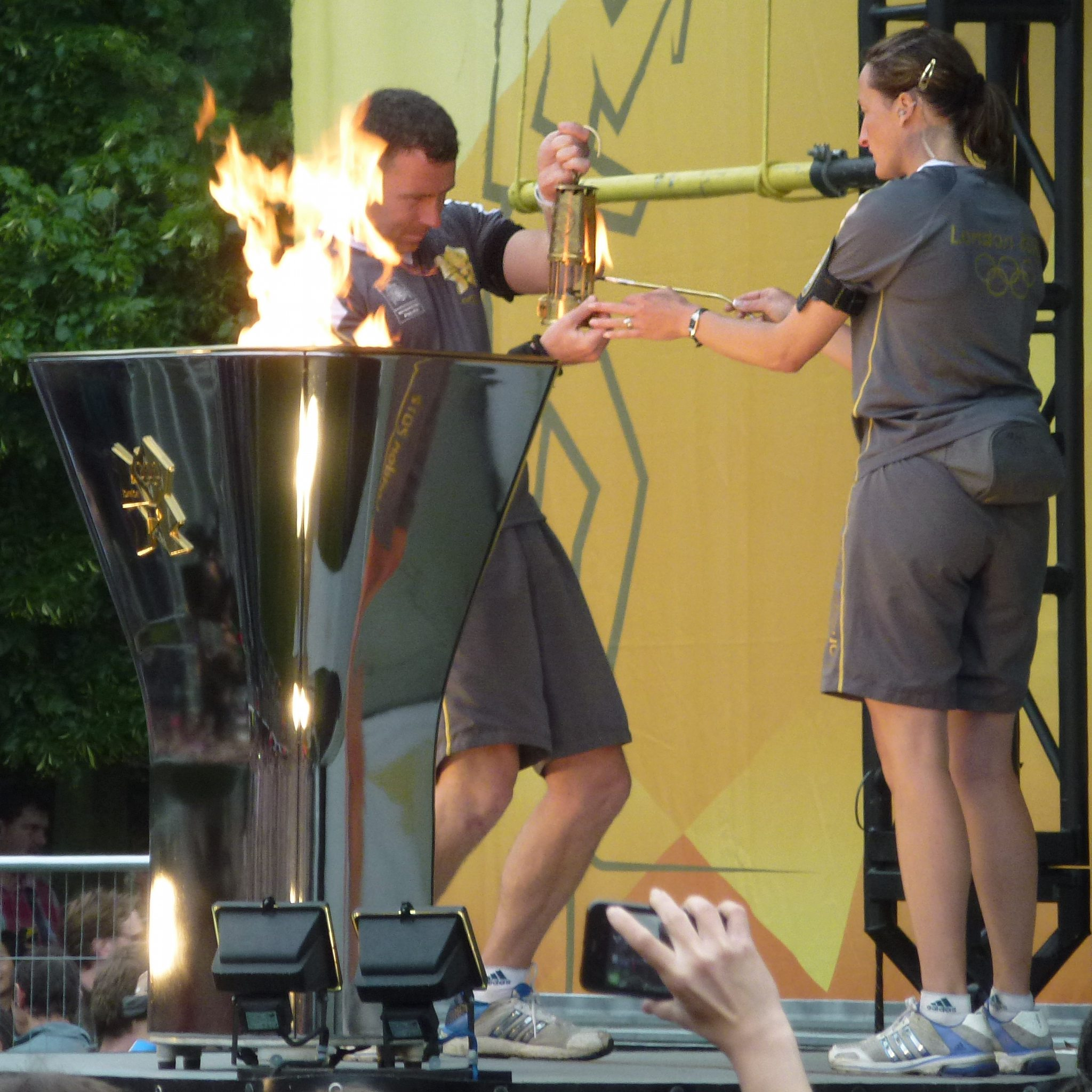
Day 50: The Olympic flame being transferred into a lantern in Cambridge for safe-keeping overnight.

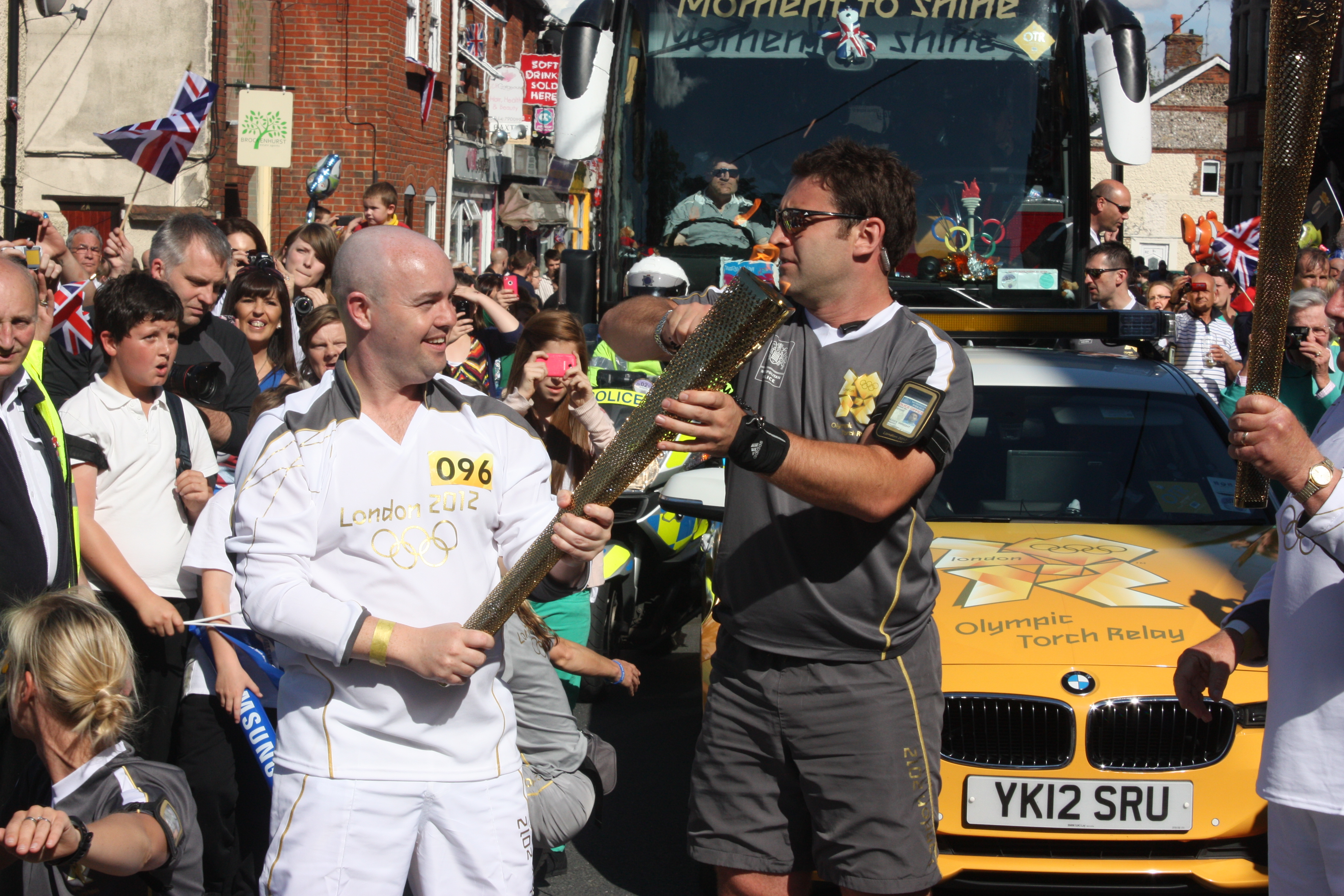
Day 54: Fundraiser Damien Davis from Cricklade carries the Olympic Flame through Ludgershall in Wiltshire.

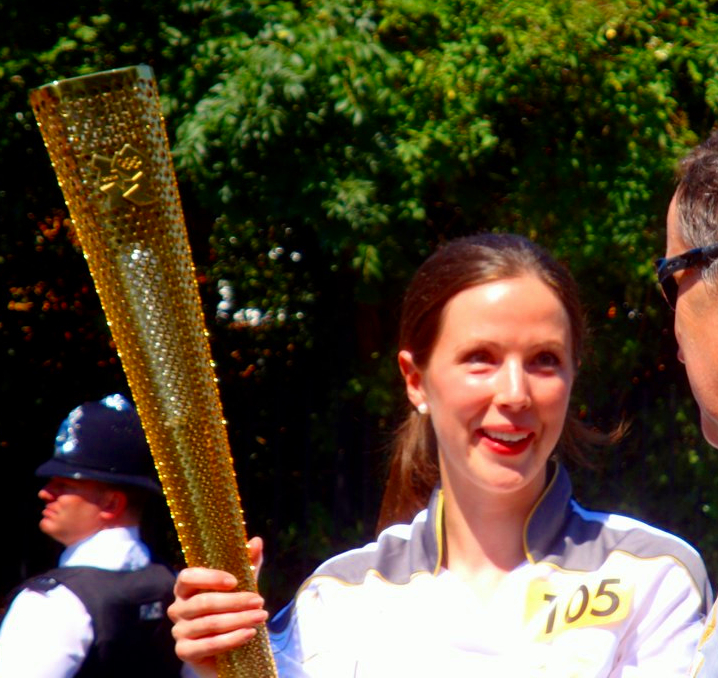
Day 66: Lucy Caslon founder and director of the charity Msizi Africa waits to receive the Olympic Flame in Sutton, South London

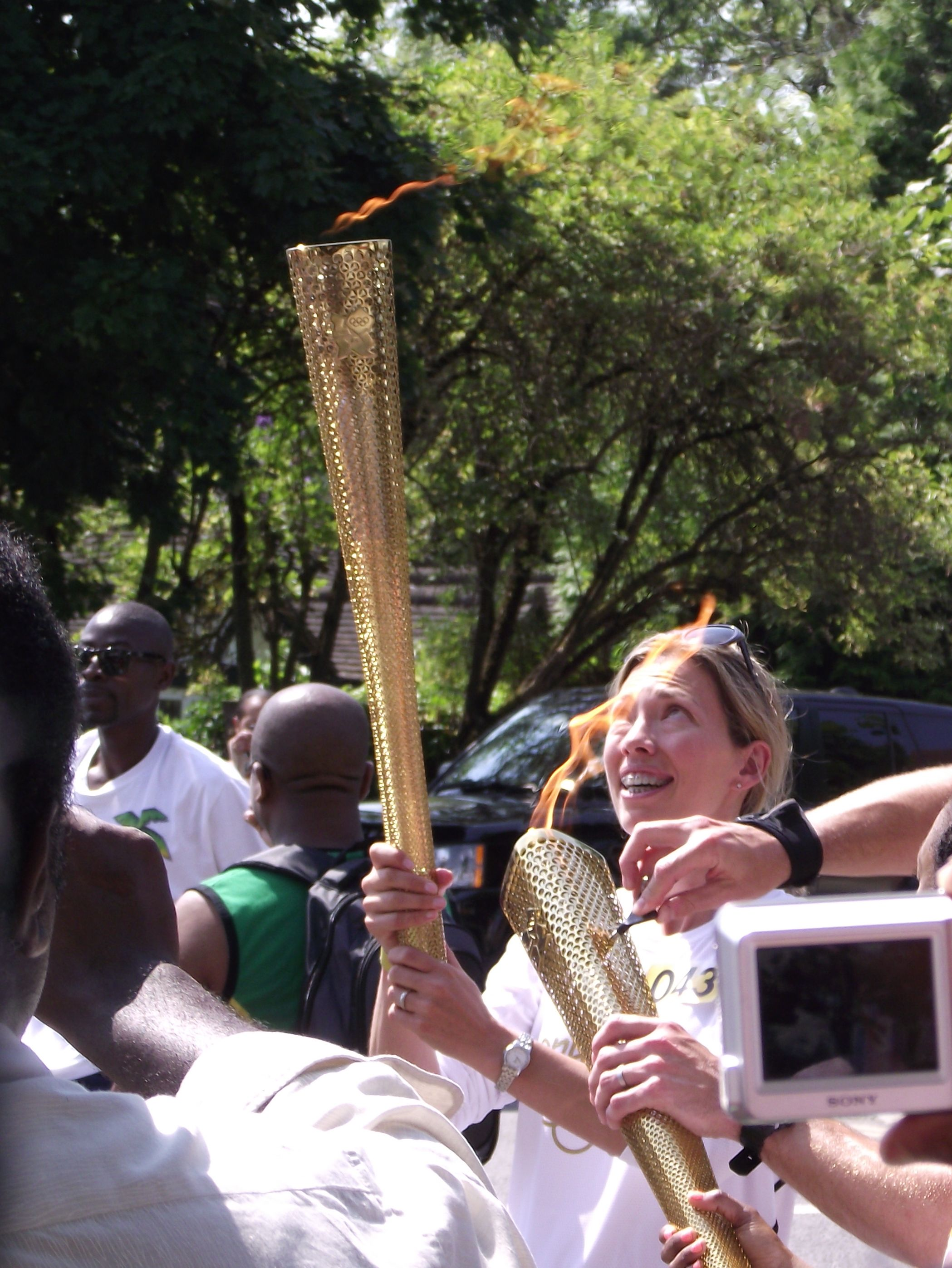
Day 68: Gold medalist Beckie Scott being handed the torch in Brent, North West London.

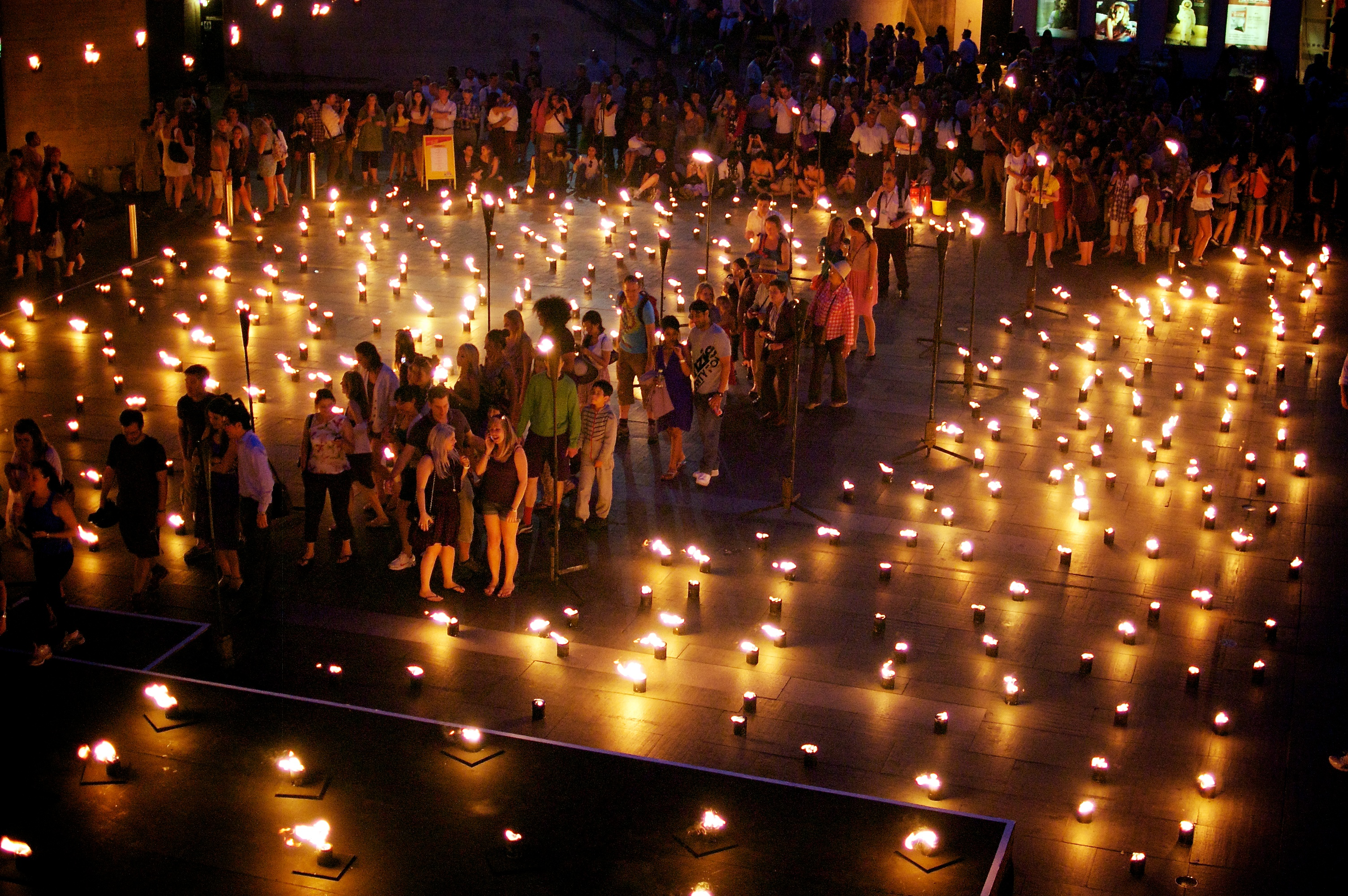
In the week preceding the Olympics, the National Theatre in London set up a 'Fire Garden' to celebrate the torch relay.

Date	Map
19 May (day 1): Land's End to Plymouth: Land's End; Sennen; Newlyn; Penzance; Marazion; Rosudgeon; Ashton; Breage; Helston; Falmouth; Truro; Newquay; St Stephen; St Austell; Stenalees; Bugle; Lanivet; Bodmin; Liskeard; Saltash; Plymouth; 20 May (day 2): Plymouth to Exeter: Brixton; Yealmpton; Modbury; Kingsbridge; West Charleton; Chillington; Torcross; Stoke Fleming; Dartmouth; Totnes; Paignton; Torquay; Teignmouth; Exeter; 21 May (day 3): Exeter to Taunton: Okehampton; Folly Gate; Hatherleigh; Merton; Great Torrington; Bideford; Sticklepath; Barnstaple; Wrafton; Braunton; Knowle; Ilfracombe; Combe Martin; Lynton; Lynmouth; Porlock; Minehead; Dunster; Carhampton; Washford; Williton; Taunton; 22 May (day 4): Taunton to Bristol: Ilminster; Yeovil; Ilchester; Somerton; Street; Glastonbury; Coxley; Wells; Croscombe; Shepton Mallet; Frome; Southwick; Trowbridge; Bradford on Avon; Bath; Bitton; Longwell Green; Hanham; Bristol; 23 May (day 5): Bristol to Cheltenham: Flax Bourton; Backwell; Nailsea; Failand; Leigh Woods; Bristol; Chippenham; Calne; Marlborough; Chiseldon; Wroughton; Royal Wootton Bassett; Swindon; Cirencester; Stroud; Painswick; Brockworth; Shurdington; Cheltenham; 24 May (day 6): Gloucester to Worcester: Gloucester; Maisemore; Hartpury; Corse; Staunton; Ledbury; Bartestree; Lugwardine; Hereford; Leominster; Ludlow; Clee Hill; Cleobury Mortimer; Far Forest; Callow Hill; Bewdley; Kidderminster; Droitwich Spa; Fernhill Heath; Worcester; 25 May (day 7): Worcester to Cardiff: Powick; Malvern; Malvern Wells; Ross-on-Wye; Monmouth; Raglan; Abergavenny; Brynmawr; Blaenavon; Abersychan; Pontypool; Newport; Cardiff; 26 May (day 8): Cardiff to Swansea: Dinas Powys; Barry; Caerphilly; Pontypridd; Merthyr Tydfil; Treherbert; Ynyswen; Treorchy; Nantymoel; Ogmore Vale; Bryncethin; Bridgend; Laleston; Pyle; Margam; Taibach; Port Talbot; Briton Ferry; Neath; Swansea; 27 May (day 9): Swansea to Aberystwyth: Llanelli; Burry Port; Kidwelly; Carmarthen; Haverfordwest; Fishguard; Newport; Cardigan; Sarnau; Brynhoffnant; Llanarth; Aberaeron; Llanon; Llanrhystud; Aberystwyth; 28 May (day 10): Aberystwyth to Bangor: Bow Street; Tal-y-bont; Tre-Taliesin; Machynlleth; Dolgellau; Llan Ffestiniog; Blaenau Ffestiniog; Porthmadog; Criccieth; Pwllheli; Bontnewydd; Caernarfon; Y Felinheli; Bangor; 29 May (day 11): Beaumaris to Chester: Beaumaris; Menai Bridge; Conwy; Deganwy; Llandudno; Penrhyn Bay; Rhos-on-Sea; Colwyn Bay; Old Colwyn; Abergele; Towyn; Kinmel Bay; Rhyl; Rhuddlan; Connah's Quay; Shotton; Queensferry; Hawarden; Saltney; Chester; 30 May (day 12): Chester to Stoke-on-Trent: Wrexham; Rhostyllen; Acrefair; Trevor; Oswestry; Pant; Llanymynech; Welshpool; Shrewsbury; Cressage; Much Wenlock; Benthall; Broseley; Ironbridge; Telford; Newport; Gnosall; Haughton; Stafford; Shelton; Stoke-on-Trent; 31 May (day 13): Stoke-on-Trent to Bolton: Cobridge; Burslem; Middleport; Crewe; Congleton; Macclesfield; Knutsford; Runcorn; Widnes; Warrington; Lowton; Abram; Wigan; Scholes; Ince; Hindley; Westhoughton; Bolton; 1 June (day 14): Bolton to Liverpool: Horwich; Chorley; Euxton; Croston; Burscough; Ormskirk; Southport; Ainsdale; Formby; Crosby; St Helens; Huyton; Knotty Ash; Old Swan; Birkenhead; Liverpool; 2 June (day 15): Liverpool to Castletown: Douglas; Laxey; Onchan; Ballasalla; Castletown	2012 Summer Olympics torch relay is located in England
3 June (day 16): Belfast to Portrush: Belfast; Holywood; Bangor; Newtownards; Comber; Dundonald; Stormont; Newtownabbey; Carrickfergus; Glynn; Larne; Drains Bay; Ballygalley; Glenarm; Carnlough; Glenariff; Cushendall; Ballycastle; Dervock; Bushmills; Portrush; 4 June (day 17): River Bann to Derry: River Bann; Coleraine; Articlave; Castlerock; Downhill; Bellarena; Limavady; Ballykelly; Greysteel; Derry; 5 June (day 18): Derry to Newry: Newbuildings; Magheramason; Bready; Ballymagorry; Strabane; Sion Mills; Omagh; Dromore; Irvinestown; Enniskillen; Fivemiletown; Clogher; Augher; Aughnacloy; Caledon; Armagh; Portadown; Gilford; Banbridge; Newry; 6 June (day 19): Dublin to Belfast: Dublin; Newry; Lisburn; Belfast; 7 June (day 20): Newcastle to Moorfields: Newcastle; Dundrum; Clough; Downpatrick; Crossgar; Saintfield; Ballynahinch; Templepatrick; Antrim; Ballyronan; Magherafelt; Ballymena; Moorfields	2012 Summer Olympics torch relay is located in Northern Ireland
8 June (day 21): Stranraer to Glasgow: Stranraer; Cairnryan; Ballantrae; Girvan; Turnberry; Maidens; Kirkoswald; Maybole; Alloway; Ayr; Kilmarnock; Kilmaurs; Stewarton; Dunlop; Barrmill; Beith; Lochwinnoch; Kilmacolm; Port Glasgow; Rutherglen; Giffnock; Glasgow; 9 June (day 22): Glasgow to Inverness: Bearsden; Clydebank; Dumbarton; Luss; Tarbet; Crianlarich; Tyndrum; Glencoe; North Ballachulish; Fort William; Spean Bridge; Fort Augustus; Invermoriston; Lewiston; Drumnadrochit; Inverness; 10 June (day 23): Kirkwall to Lerwick: Kirkwall; Lerwick; 11 June (day 24): Stornoway to Aberdeen: Stornoway; Inverness; Aviemore; Carrbridge; Grantown-on-Spey; Tomintoul; Crathie; Ballater; Dinnet; Aboyne; Kincardine O'Neil; Banchory; Drumoak; Peterculter; Bieldside; Cults; Aberdeen; 12 June (day 25): Aberdeen to Dundee: Stonehaven; Marykirk; Hillside; Montrose; Brechin; Forfar; Meigle; Coupar Angus; Woodside; Burrelton; Balbeggie; Scone; Scone Palace; Perth; Abernethy; Newburgh; Cupar; Dairsie; Guardbridge; Leuchars; Dundee; 13 June (day 26): St Andrews to Edinburgh: St Andrews; Milnathort; Kinross; Crook of Devon; Alloa; Bridge of Allan; Dunblane; Stirling; Cumbernauld; Larbert; Camelon; Falkirk; Skinflats; Cairneyhill; Crossford; Dunfermline; Hopetoun House; Broxburn; Edinburgh	2012 Summer Olympics torch relay is located in Scotland
14 June (day 27): Edinburgh to Alnwick: Duddingston; Musselburgh; Dalkeith; Lasswade; Loanhead; Bilston; Milton Bridge; Penicuik; Eddleston; Peebles; Innerleithen; Walkerburn; Selkirk; Galashiels; Earlston; Gordon; Greenlaw; Duns; Chirnside; Foulden; Berwick-upon-Tweed; Bamburgh; Alnwick; 15 June (day 28): Alnwick to Newcastle upon Tyne: Hipsburn; Warkworth; Amble; Ashington; Choppington; Morpeth; Hartford; Bedlington; Blyth; Whitley Bay; Cullercoats; Tynemouth; North Shields; Howdon; Wallsend; Newcastle upon Tyne; 16 June (day 29): Gateshead to Durham: Gateshead; South Shields; Whitburn; Sunderland; Low Fell; Blaydon-on-Tyne; Prudhoe; Stocksfield; Hexham; Riding Mill; Consett; Moorside; Castleside; Tow Law; Esh; Langley Park; Durham; 17 June (day 30): Durham to Middlesbrough: Sherburn; Sherburn Hill; Haswell Plough; Peterlee; Horden; Blackhall Colliery; Hartlepool; Billingham; Sedgefield; Bishop Auckland; Shildon; Middridge; Newton Aycliffe; Beaumont Hill; Harrowgate Hill; Darlington; Stockton-on-Tees; Middlesbrough; 18 June (day 31): Middlesbrough to Hull: Redcar; Marske-by-the-Sea; Saltburn-by-the-Sea; Brotton; Carlin How; Loftus; Hinderwell; Lythe; Sandsend; Whitby; Pickering; Scarborough; Filey; Bridlington; Beverley; Hull; 19 June (day 32): Hull to York: Brough; Goole; Camblesforth; Selby; Monk Fryston; Barkston Ash; Tadcaster; Boston Spa; Wetherby; Harewood; Knaresborough; Harrogate; Ripon; York; 20 June (day 33): York to Carlisle: Thirsk; Northallerton; Aiskew; Bedale; Aysgarth; Leyburn; Richmond; Barnard Castle; Brough; Appleby-in-Westmorland; Penrith; Carlisle; 21 June (day 34): Dumfries to Bowness-on-Windermere: Dumfries; Annan; Eastriggs; Gretna; Carlisle; Wigton; Aspatria; Maryport; Flimby; Workington; Whitehaven; Cockermouth; Keswick; Grasmere; Ambleside; Bowness-on-Windermere; 22 June (day 35): Kendal to Blackpool: Kendal; Milnthorpe; Carnforth; Bolton-le-Sands; Hest Bank; Morecambe; Lancaster; Garstang; St Michael's on Wyre; Fleetwood; Cleveleys; Blackpool; 23 June (day 36): Lytham St Annes to Manchester: Lytham St Annes; Warton; Preston; Blackburn; Accrington; Burnley; Crawshawbooth; Reedsholme; Rawtenstall; Rochdale; Heywood; Bury; Whitefield; Prestwich; Higher Broughton; Cheetham Hill; Manchester; 24 June (day 37): Salford to Leeds: Salford; Trafford; Moss Side; Rusholme; Longsight; Levenshulme; Stockport; Ashton-under-Lyne; Oldham; Marsh; Huddersfield; Brighouse; Halifax; Bradford; Keighley; Skipton; Ilkley; Headingley; Potternewton; Harehills; Richmond Hill; Leeds; 25 June (day 38): Leeds to Sheffield: Hunslet; Beeston; Morley; Batley; Dewsbury; Wakefield; Castleford; Pontefract; Ackworth; Lundwood; Cundy Cross; Barnsley; Darton; Kexbrough; Chapeltown; Ecclesfield; Parson Cross; Sheffield; 26 June (day 39): Sheffield to Cleethorpes: Rotherham; Templeborough; Dalton; Thrybergh; Conisbrough; Warmsworth; Doncaster; Armthorpe; Dunsville; Hatfield; Scunthorpe; Brigg; Wrawby; Immingham; Grimsby; Cleethorpes; 27 June (day 40): Grimsby to Lincoln: Grimsby; Louth; Legbourne; Withern; Maltby le Marsh; Mablethorpe; Trusthorpe; Sutton-on-Sea; Mumby; Hogsthorpe; Ingoldmells; Winthorpe; Skegness; Wainfleet All Saints; Wrangle; Boston; Sleaford; Bracebridge Heath; Lincoln; 28 June (day 41): Lincoln to Nottingham: Saxilby; Darlton; East Markham; Tuxford; Kirton; Boughton; Edwinstowe; Mansfield; Kelham; Newark-on-Trent; Balderton; Grantham; Radcliffe-on-Trent; Nottingham; 29 June (day 42): Nottingham to Derby: Glapwell; Bolsover; Calow; Chesterfield; Matlock; Darley Dale; Bakewell; Buxton; Ashbourne; Derby; 30 June (day 43): Derby to Birmingham: Burton upon Trent; Streethay; Lichfield; Hopwas; Tamworth; Great Wyrley; Newtown; Bloxwich; Leamore; Birchills; Walsall; Willenhall; Wolverhampton; Dudley; Oldbury; West Bromwich; Smethwick; Birmingham; 1 July (day 44): Birmingham to Coventry: Solihull; Earlswood; Redditch; Astwood Bank; Alcester; Evesham; Wickhamford; Broadway; Chipping Campden; Newbold on Stour; Alderminster; Stratford-upon-Avon; Warwick; Leamington Spa; Kenilworth; Coventry; 2 July (day 45): Coventry to Leicester: Rugby; Dunchurch; Northampton; Wellingborough; Isham; Kettering; Geddington; Corby; Dingley; Market Harborough; Lubenham; Foxton; Kibworth Harcourt; Oadby; Leicester; 3 July (day 46): Leicester to Peterborough: Quorn; Loughborough; Hoton; Wymeswold; Asfordby; Melton Mowbray; Langham; Oakham; Uppingham; Stamford; Peterborough; 4 July (day 47): Peterborough to Norwich: Market Deeping; Thurlby; Bourne; Spalding; Moulton; Whaplode; Holbeach; Long Sutton; King's Lynn; South Wootton; West Rudham; East Rudham; Fakenham; Holt; Cromer; Aylsham; Norwich	2012 Summer Olympics torch relay is located in Northern England
5 July (day 48): Norwich to Ipswich: Acle; Filby; Great Yarmouth; Lowestoft; Wrentham; Reydon; Southwold; Kelsale; Saxmundham; Aldeburgh; Wickham Market; Ufford; Melton; Woodbridge; Felixstowe; Ipswich; 6 July (day 49): Ipswich to Chelmsford: Colchester; Hatfield Peverel; Heybridge; Maldon; Rayleigh; Southend-on-Sea; Hadleigh; Basildon; Grays; Herongate; Brentwood; Chelmsford; 7 July (day 50): Chelmsford to Cambridge: Harlow; Waltham Abbey; Waltham Cross; Hertford; Ware; Bishop's Stortford; Stansted Mountfitchet; Newport; Saffron Walden; Haverhill; Bury St Edmunds; Newmarket; Cambridge; 8 July (day 51): Cambridge to Luton: St Ives; Huntingdon; Bedford; Cotton End; Letchworth; Stevenage; Welwyn Garden City; Hatfield; St Albans; Hemel Hempstead; Luton; 9 July (day 52): Luton to Oxford: Dunstable; Milton Keynes; Bletchley; Buckingham; Winslow; Whitchurch; Aylesbury; Stoke Mandeville; Aylesbury; Waddesdon; Bicester; Kirtlington; Woodstock; Kidlington; Oxford; 10 July (day 53): Oxford to Reading: Abingdon-on-Thames; Wallingford; Crowmarsh Gifford; Nettlebed; Henley-on-Thames; Bisham (Bisham Abbey); Maidenhead; Slough; Windsor; Egham; Ascot; Bracknell; Reading; 11 July (day 54): Reading to Salisbury: Theale; Thatcham; Newbury; Basingstoke; Kings Worthy; Winchester; Andover; Ludgershall; Tidworth; Amesbury; Winterbourne; Salisbury; 12 July (day 55): Salisbury to Weymouth: Wilton; Barford St Martin; Fovant; Ludwell; Shaftesbury; Fontmell Magna; Iwerne Minster; Stourpaine; Blandford Forum; Winterborne Whitechurch; Milborne St Andrew; Puddletown; Dorchester; Winterbourne Abbas; Bridport; Chideock; Lyme Regis; Burton Bradstock; Abbotsbury; Portesham; Chickerell; Wyke Regis; Osprey Quay; Weymouth; 13 July (day 56): Portland Bill to Bournemouth: Portland Bill; Southwell; Weston; Easton; Portland; Fortuneswell; Weymouth; Preston; Osmington; Winfrith Newburgh; Wool; Corfe Castle; Swanage; Stoborough; Wareham; Sandford; Lytchett Minster; Upton; Hamworthy; Poole; Ashley Cross; Branksome; Wallisdown; Bournemouth	2012 Summer Olympics torch relay is located in England
14 July (day 57): Bournemouth to Southampton: Boscombe; Christchurch; Lyndhurst; Brockenhurst; Lymington; Totland; Yarmouth; Carisbrooke; Newport; East Cowes; Southampton; 15 July (day 58): Southampton to Portsmouth: Saint Peter Port; Saint Helier; Fareham; Bridgemary; Gosport; Portsmouth	2012 Summer Olympics torch relay is located in the United Kingdom
16 July (day 59): Portsmouth to Brighton and Hove: Petersfield; Rogate; Midhurst; Easebourne; Tillington; Petworth; Duncton; Chichester; North Bersted; South Bersted; Bognor Regis; Woodgate; Westergate; Arundel; Worthing; Lancing; West Blatchington; Brighton and Hove; 17 July (day 60): Brighton and Hove to Hastings: Crawley; Copthorne; Felbridge; East Grinstead; Royal Tunbridge Wells; Crowborough; Lewes; Eastbourne; Pevensey; Bexhill-on-Sea; St Leonards-on-Sea; Hastings; 18 July (day 61): Hastings to Dover: Rye; Hamstreet; Ashford; Hythe; Sandgate; Folkestone; Dover; 19 July (day 62): Deal to Maidstone: Deal; Sholden; Sandwich; Great Stonar; Cliffsend; St Lawrence; Ramsgate; Broadstairs; St Peter's; Cliftonville; Margate; Westgate-on-Sea; Birchington-on-Sea; Upstreet; Sturry; Canterbury; Thanington Without; Faversham; Challock; Harrietsham; Maidstone; 20 July (day 63): Maidstone to Guildford: Chatham; Gillingham; Rochester; Higham; Gravesend; Borough Green; Seal; Sevenoaks; Riverhead; Godstone; Bletchingley; Redhill; Reigate; Dorking; Westcott; Shere; Godalming; Guildford	2012 Summer Olympics torch relay is located in Southeast England
21 July (day 64): Greenwich to Waltham Forest: Greenwich; Newham; Tower Hamlets; Hackney; Waltham Forest; 22 July (day 65): Redbridge to Bexley: Redbridge; Barking and Dagenham; Havering; Bexley; 23 July (day 66): Lewisham to Wandsworth: Lewisham; Bromley; Croydon; Sutton; Merton; Wandsworth; 24 July (day 67): Kingston to Ealing: Kingston; Richmond; Hounslow; Hillingdon; Ealing; 25 July (day 68): Harrow to Haringey: Harrow; Brent; Barnet; Enfield; Haringey; 26 July (day 69): Camden to Westminster: Camden; Islington; City; Southwark; Lambeth; Hammersmith and Fulham; Kensington and Chelsea; Westminster; 27 July (day 70): Hampton Court Palace to Olympic Park: Hampton Court Palace; Olympic Park; Olympic Stadium	2012 Summer Olympics torch relay is located in Greater London

== End of relay ==
The end of the relay took place in the 2012 Summer Olympics opening ceremony.

The torch arrived aboard a speedboat piloted by David Beckham, via the Limehouse Cut. Steve Redgrave received the flame from young footballer Jade Bailey, the torchbearer on the boat, and carried it into the Olympic Stadium. Then Redgrave handed the torch to seven young athletes, each one nominated by an athlete. The athletes then each applied their torch to one of the 204 petals, which then lit and converged to create the cauldron, which was designed by Thomas Heatherwick.

== See also ==
- 2012 Summer Paralympics torch relay
- Real Relay
- Episode 4466, episode of EastEnders in which the torch was carried (https://www.youtube.com/watch?v=g24q1nu-hg4)
