= DM Crombie =

Military munitions depot

Coordinates: 56.040299°N 3.529687°W

Defence Munitions Crombie is a military munitions depot on the upper Firth of Forth in West Fife, Scotland. The depot is located on the north shore of the river, south of the village of Crombie and west of Charlestown. The site commenced operations in 1916. It was formerly known as RNAD Crombie and DMC Crombie. It is now operated as part of the UK's Defence Storage and Distribution Agency.

The depot has two jetties and a deep water channel allowing Royal Navy warships and Royal Fleet Auxiliary replenishment vessels to moor for resupply.

The US Navy operates a cooperative security location (CSL) at the depot which provides logistical capabilities in support of US Navy and allied forces operating in northern Europe. The CSL is administered by Naval Supply Systems Command's Fleet Logistics Center Sigonella, based at Naval Air Station Sigonella in Italy.

== History ==
DM Crombie formerly served as the primary munitions depot for Rosyth Naval Yard, which is 3 miles (5 km) downriver of the depot. Since the naval yard's closure, DM Crombie has been retained primarily as a loading/off-loading facility for naval vessels and the storage and maintenance of the Royal Air Force's air launched weapons. In 2003 the site employed around 200 people; by 2012 this was reduced to 84 staff, all civilians.

The site occupies about 200 acres.
