= Crossford, Fife =

Coordinates: 56.06167°N 3.50167°W

Crossford
- Location within Fife
- Population: 2,320 (2020)
- OS grid reference: NT068866
- Council area: Fife
- Country: Scotland
- Sovereign state: United Kingdom
- Police: Scotland
- Fire: Scottish
- Ambulance: Scottish
- UK Parliament: Dunfermline and West Fife
- Scottish Parliament: Dunfermline

Crossford is a small village located in West Fife, Scotland. Its population was 2,358 in 2011. It is 1 mile (1.6 kilometers) west of the city Dunfermline, east of Cairneyhill, astride the A994.

The village has mixed housing with large housing estates on the southwest and northwest ends. Most residents work either locally or commute to Edinburgh or Glasgow.

Crossford lies north of the Firth of Forth and 17 mi (27 km) from Edinburgh.

== Bus Routes ==
The village sits on the main bus route X24 X27 from Fife to Central Glasgow's Buchanan Bus Station. Bus routes 8, and 8A go to High Vallyfield and Stirling. Bus route 89 goes to St Margarets Hospital in Dunfermline and then to North Queensferry.

Dunfermline City rail station is 2 1/2 mi (4 km) away.

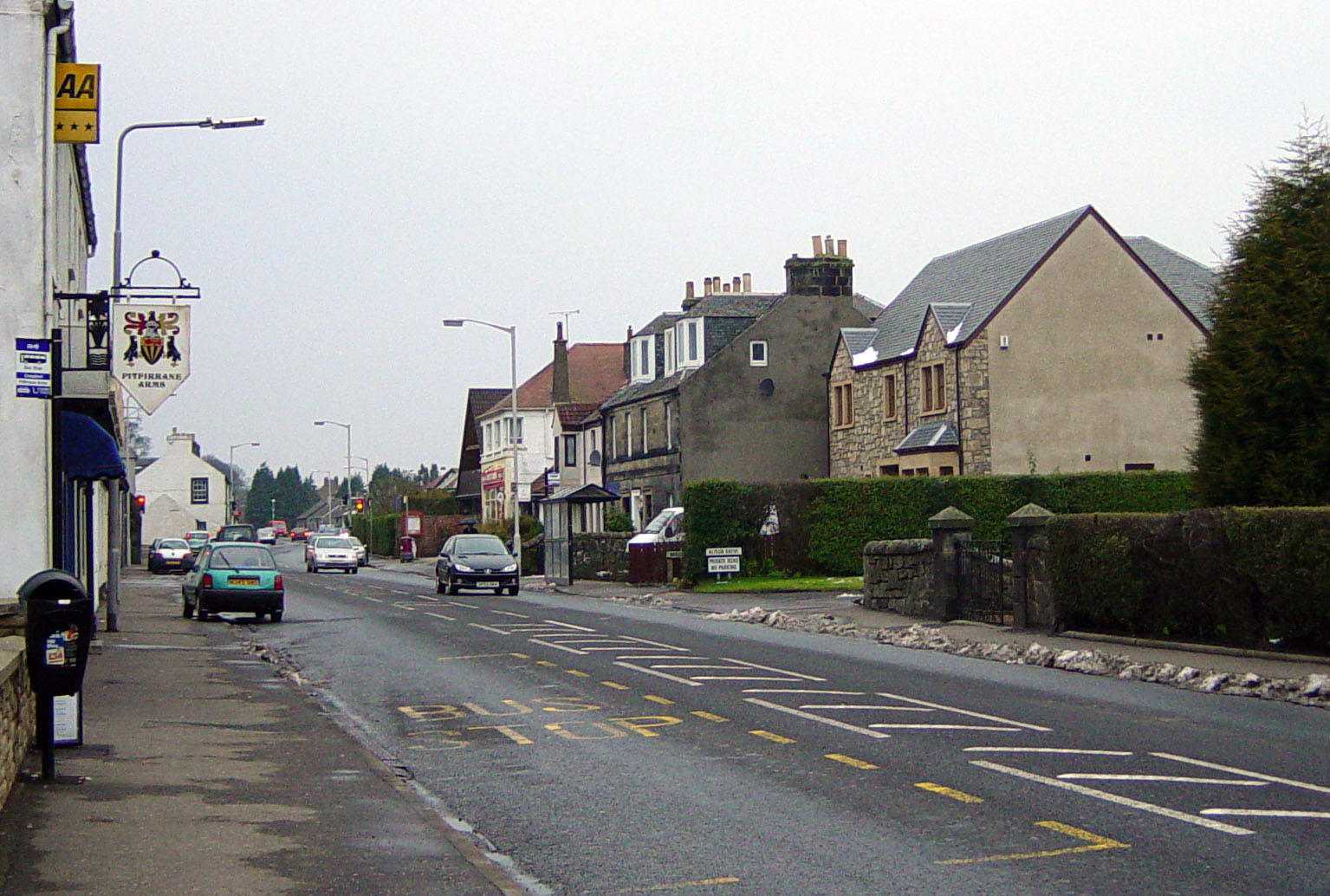
Crossford Main Street looking west on a cold morning in March 2006

== Local Facilities ==
Crossford Primary School was built in 1973 replacing the old school that was located on the North side of the A994 halfway between Cairneyhill and Crossford. The school has ten teaching areas in a semi-open plan arrangement, plus a separate nursery class. There is a grass playing field for football and other sports.

At the park there is a Scout hall (with Scouts and Girl Guides held weekly).

On Main Street, the Village Hall is used by a variety of organisations including; Crossford Playgroup, Crossford Ladies Group, SWRI, Zumba classes, religious meetings, and Crossford Community Council.

The highlights of the social year in Crossford are probably the Children's Gala events held over the year to raise funds for the November Fireworks and the Gala Week, with daily events, each June. The Children's Gala has been held since 1955 and is organised by the Crossford Gala Committee for children from the village.

== Businesses and employment ==
Businesses in the village include a Pharmacy and Post Office, supermarket (Co-operative), bakers, hairdresse, beauty salon, chip shop, with garage and fireplace sales situated to the east.

The Adamson Hotel formerly known as The Pitfirrane Arms Hotel is in the centre of the village and is one of the few original Coaching Inns left in Scotland.

The Keavil House Hotel stands in 12 acres (5 hectares) of grounds to the west of Crossford and its meeting facilities, restaurant and health club with swimming pool are an amenity for the village and surrounding area.

== Sport ==
Crossford boasts the King George V Memorial Park playing fields, opened in 1950 by the Countess of Elgin. The land was gifted by the Halkett family of the Pitfirrane Estate. The community itself paid for the establishment of the facilities together with a Major Fiddes of the National Playing Fields Association. New sports facilities in King George V Memorial Park were unveiled on 8 May 2005. The floodlit, all-weather multi court was proposed by Crossford Recreation and the Environment, and will be used by schools and the community for five-a-side football, tennis, basketball, hockey, and netball.

To the southeast of Crossford the Dunfermline Golf Club has an 18-hole golf course. The Halkett family owned the Pitfirrane Estate until 1951, living in the Pitfirrane Castle which has become the clubhouse.

Crossford is an ideal centre for walking. Numerous pathways radiate from the village, to Dean Woods and Milesmark in the north, to Pitliver and Limekilns/Charlestown in the south, to Cairneyhill in the west and to Pittencrieff Park at Dunfermline, in the east. To the north of the village, near Dean Woods, there is a paved cycle track which extends from Dunfermline to Clackmannan.

== History ==
Crossford can trace its history back into the distant past with Bronze Age discoveries having been made on Craigs Farm indicating agricultural activity into antiquity. Crossford is said to take its name from the ford crossed by monks on their way between the abbeys of Dunfermline and Culross. and together with the early agricultural activity this seems to form the main part of the activity in the village. In the 16th century the village found a new life as coal and ironstone were mined from the lands of Pitfirrane under a charter granted to the Lairds of Pitfirrane (the Halkett family) by Queen Mary. The produce of this activity was then transported down the Waggon Road to Limekilns for shipping via the port there. The Halketts enjoyed a privilege to ship free of duty to all foreign lands until 1788 when the government purchased the right for £40,000. The uppermost 4 inches and lowermost 2 inches of ironstone were said to be of such high quality as to be suitable for the making of cannon, and the produce was shipped to the Carron Company ironworks for that purpose.

The introduction of the Turnpike Act in 1796 brought about the installation of a tollbar on the Waggon Road. The building housing this still exists on the crossroads in the centre of the village.

At the beginning of the 19th century, it is recorded that some 50 handlooms were in use in the village with a population of 380 persons. This follows a pattern in the area for such weaving communities, another example being Gowkhall a few miles north.

The Earls of Elgin owned land in the Crossford area in connection with the Elgin Colliery (at Parkneuk and Baldridge Burn, northwest of Dunfermline) and the Elgin Railway that ran from the colliery round Crossford and then down beside Waggon Road and on to Charlestown harbour. The route of the railway and the site of the Elgin Colliery are shown in a map in Chalmers' book, Historical and Statistical Account of Dunfermline. Photographs are available online of where the railway was.

An 1856 map shows a brewery at the west end of the village, and whinstone quarry to the north of the main road.

During World War I the modern day Keavil House Hotel was used by the Admiralty as a location to base high-ranking officers, the naval base at Rosyth (Rosyth Dockyard) being of a much greater size and importance at the time. During 1917 the First Sea Lord, Prince Louis of Battenburg and his son (Earl Mountbatten of Burma) were in residence when their names were officially changed to Mountbatten in order to reduce the Germanic image. This was very common in the UK at the time given the situation of total war being prosecuted against Germany. Prince Louis wrote in the visitors' book at Keavil "July 9th: arrived Prince Hyde. July19th: departed Lord Jekyll." From 1955 until 1975/6, the building was used as the Martha Frew Childrens Home for children placed in care by Dunfermline town council. Responsibility shifted between the newly formed Fife Regional Council and Dunfermline District Councils before being sold privately and renovated as a hotel in 1978/9.

Crossford also boasts the Pitfirrane Castle, a 16th-century 4 storey Towerhouse. In modern times this has become home to the Dunfermline Golf Club. The building has been modified and extended in recent years, but still maintains some impressive stained glass and much of its original stature.

== Nature ==
The land around Crossford is fertile and sought after for agriculture. There is a designated Green Belt at the southeast of the village, between Waggon Road and Dunfermline which attracts a variety of birdlife; pheasant, wild geese, curlew, heron, et cetera. On the southwest corner, near Keavil Steadings, is the Crossford sycamore, of about 300 years — a significant heritage tree which is recorded in the veteran tree register. The Crossford Burn comes from the Dean Wood, in the north and travels through the village to join the Lyne Burn near the railway at the south. Land to the south of the village is of high risk to river flooding.

== Useful Information ==
- Telephone area code: 01383 (Dunfermline)
- Post Code: KY12 area (Dunfermline)
- SEPA floodmap: http://map.sepa.org.uk/floodmap/map.htm
