= Real Relay =

The EnduranceLife Real Relay was an unofficial event following the route of the 2012 Summer Olympics torch relay, conceived by Andrew Barker, an endurance runner.

After the Olympic torch relay had begun Barker, his wife Charlotte, and organiser Kate Treleaven were dismayed to discover the torch would be carried by a security van for 80% of its journey. In contrast the Real Relay was run entirely on foot.

The Real Relay began ten days after the official relay at midnight on 28 May 2012, and reached the gates of the Olympic Park at 2.00pm on 22 July 2012, several days in advance of the official torch. In place of the Olympic torch, a single baton fitted with a GPS tracking device was passed along the entire route.

== Stages and Route ==
The route was divided into 672 stages, averaging ten miles per stage, which were posted in batches on the Real Relay website. Each stage featured a start and end point – such as a city, town, or landmark – which related to the Olympic torch relay. The first person to volunteer for the stage secured the right to carry the torch and to designate the exact route between points. Runners were required to keep a ten minutes per mile pace so that the aim of reaching the Olympic stadium in advance of the opening ceremony could be achieved.

=== Modifications to Olympic Route ===
Distinct from the Olympic torch relay, the Real Relay baton was taken to the peaks of Scafell Pike, Slieve Donard and Ben Nevis, the tallest mountains in England, Northern Ireland and the United Kingdom, respectively.

Organisers of the EnduranceLife Real Relay hoped to obtain permission from LOCOG to end the relay with a lap of the Olympic stadium, but this was refused by officials due to ongoing rehearsals for the opening ceremony.

== Recognition ==
The One Show on BBC One featured the Real Relay on 23 July 2012 including an interview with Kate Treleaven and footage of the final five miles. Around twenty of the runners were guests in the studio.

== Charitable Donations ==
All participating runners were asked to contribute at least £10 to CHICKS, a charity providing week-long respite breaks for disadvantaged children across the UK. Donations reached over £10,000.
