= Limekilns =

Coordinates: 56.0329°N 3.4795°W

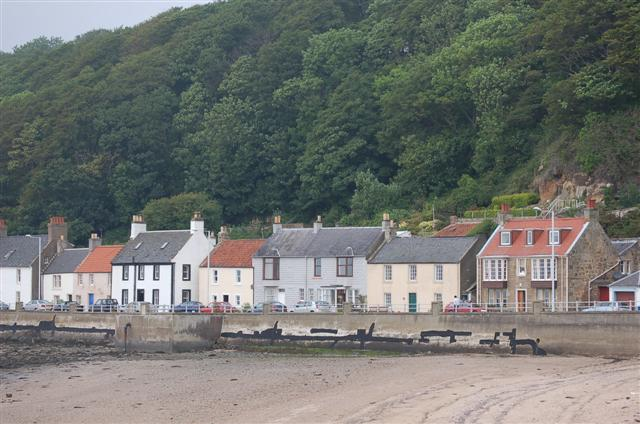
- Houses along the shore at Limekilns

- Location within Fife
- Population: 1,450 (2020)
- OS grid reference: NT079832
- Council area: Fife
- Lieutenancy area: Fife
- Country: Scotland
- Sovereign state: United Kingdom
- Post town: DUNFERMLINE
- Postcode district: KY11
- Dialling code: 01383
- Police: Scotland
- Fire: Scottish
- Ambulance: Scottish
- UK Parliament: Dunfermline and West Fife
- Scottish Parliament: Dunfermline

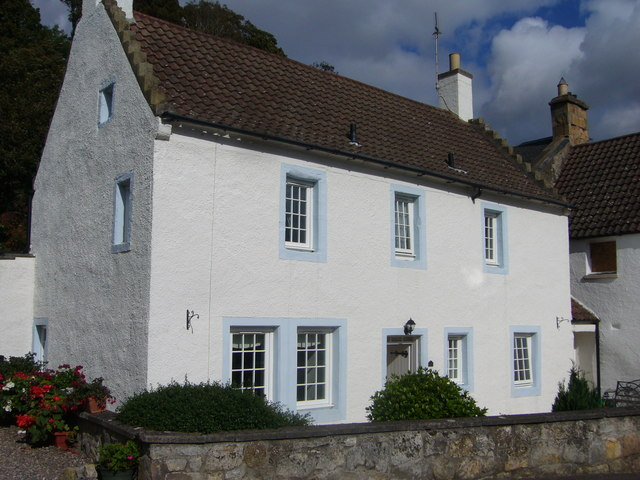
18th-century house in Limekilns

Limekilns is a historic coastal village in Fife, Scotland. It lies on the shore of the Firth of Forth, around 3 miles (5 km) south of Dunfermline and 13 miles (21km) northwest of Edinburgh.

Limekilns has a medieval past as a fishing village, dating back to the 14th century. The town gets its name from its 18th century limestone industry, with lime kilns still found at the near contingent town of Charlestown. Today, the town is popular with tourists and is home to 40 listed buildings by Historic Scotland. The population is 1,450 (2020)

== History and economy ==
Unlike the neighbouring village of Charlestown, Limekilns is an old settlement dating back to the 14th century. In its early days Limekilns was mainly a fishing village, with the large natural harbour, sheltered by the rocky ridge known as The Ghauts, providing docking facilities for small to medium transport and cargo ships. From here ships traded with the ports in the Baltic Sea and France until the seventeenth century when the Union of the Crowns saw the royal interests move south to London. In the early 14th century there was a port for the town of Dunfermline, called Galletts, at the site of the current settlement of Limekilns, this served as the principal port for the town which lies a few miles inland.

The importance of the local limestone became clear quite early in the village's history, being used both as a fertiliser and for the manufacture of mortar used in the construction of stone buildings. Workings using kilns fuelled by charcoal and later coal to convert lime to quicklime grew up, the product being exported from the port along the east coast of Scotland. Today the only tangible legacy of this industry in village is the name Limekilns. In the 1750s the lime industry transferred a mile or so west along the coast to Charlestown, where the ruins of the massive kilns still exist today.

For many centuries Limekilns was also the northern terminus for a ferry linking it to Bo'ness on the southern side of the Forth. This found an echo in Robert Louis Stevenson's Kidnapped: and it was from Limekilns that David Balfour and Alan Breck were carried across the Forth in a rowing boat.

Soap was also produced from a soapworks located near Caupernaum Pier. The 'Soap Sheds' still exist and are used as storage facilities. The years of industrial decline meant that most of these industries were lost and Limekilns became just another sleepy coastal village. New housing estates were added during the property boom of the 1970s and 1980s, considerably boosting the size and population of the village.

== Landmarks ==
Limekilns sits within the lands which traditionally belonged to the Earl of Elgin of Broomhall House, which overlooks the village.

The oldest building in the village is The King's Cellar, a large property which can be traced back to 1362. It has served many different purposes throughout its long life, notably as a store house, school, library and chapel. It is currently employed as a Freemasons Lodge and is generally not open to the public.

The village has a range of amenities including a primary school, doctor's surgery, shops and a Sea Scout Group as well as a Guide unit. The Ship Inn is said to be the 'watering hole' featured in Robert Louis Stevenson's novel Kidnapped.

== Transport ==
The Earls of Elgin owned land in the Crossford area in connection with the Elgin Colliery (at Parkneuk and Baldridge Burn, NW of Dunfermline) and the Elgin Railway that ran from the Colliery round Crossford and then down beside Waggon Road and on to Charlestown harbour. The route of the railway and the site of the Elgin Colliery are shown in a map in Chalmers' book, Historical and Statistical Account of Dunfermline.

To the north, paths run via Pitliver to Crossford and through the estate of the Earl of Elgin and Wester Gellet to Pittencrieff Park at Dunfermline.

== Notable people ==
Limekilns is the birthplace of George Thomson.
