= Crombie, Fife =

Coordinates: 56°02′56″N 3°31′40″W

Crombie: Scottish Gaelic: Crombaidh
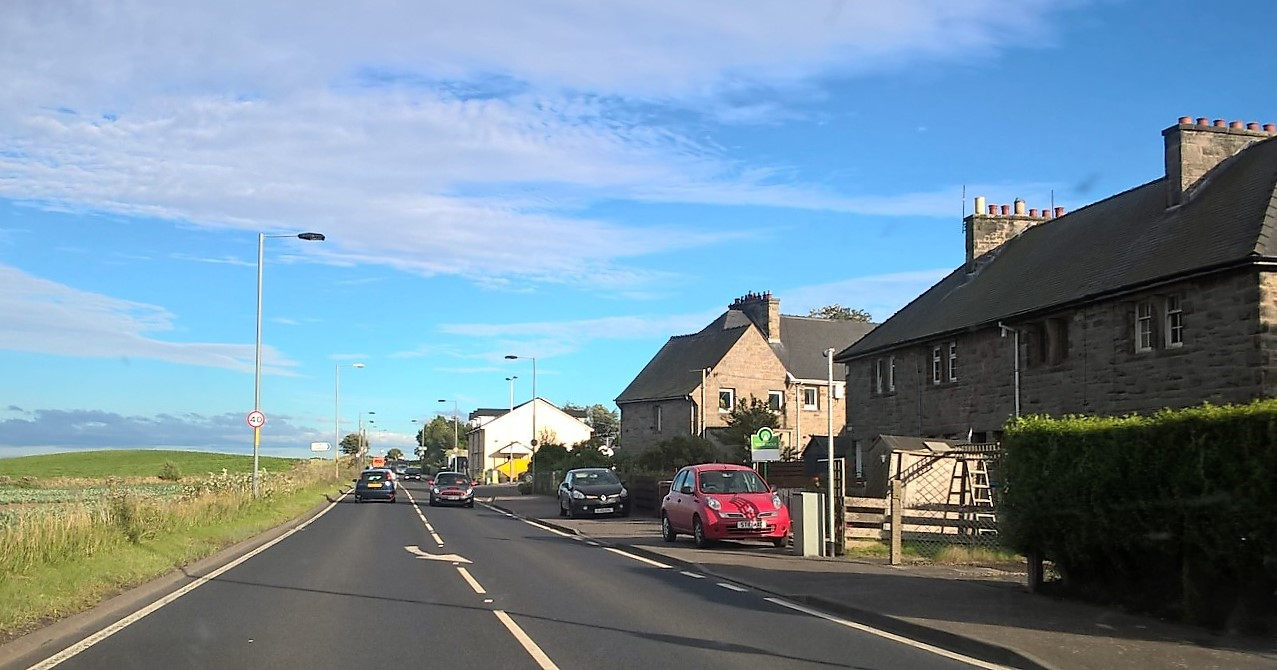
- Main Road

- Location within Fife
- Civil parish: Torryburn
- Council area: Fife
- Lieutenancy area: Fife
- Country: Scotland
- Sovereign state: United Kingdom
- Police: Scotland
- Fire: Scottish
- Ambulance: Scottish

Crombie is a village in the civil parish of Torryburn, in southwest Fife, Scotland. The village is on the A985 road 3 miles (5 km) west of Dunfermline and is to the south of Cairneyhill, and north-west of Charlestown. On the southern side of the village is Defence Munitions Crombie, a military munitions depot and pier on the upper Firth of Forth.

== Geography and community facilities ==
It comprises around 200 houses, a community center and garden. There is a local residents association.

The Fife Coastal Path goes through the village.

== History ==
The former parish of Crombie was united with Torryburn in 1622. The old parish church, to the west of the present village, is now a ruined scheduled monument. Parts of the old church date to the 13th century.

Pitliver House is a Category B listed country house and estate to the east of the village.

In the late 18th century, two homes were erected at Crombie Point, by the Forth. These are now Category C and Category B listed.

In the First World War, an anti-aircraft battery was erected at Crombie. A wooden church was built in Crombie in the 1920s by the Admiralty. Crombie Primary School was built in 1925.
