= Cairneyhill =

Coordinates: 56°03′35″N 3°32′05″W

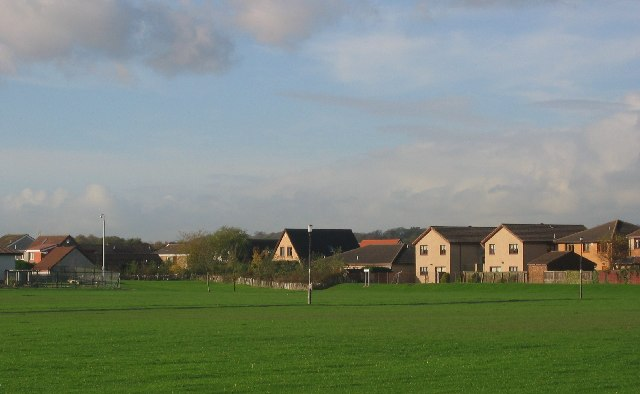
- Modern houses on the north side of Cairneyhill

- Location within Fife
- Population: 2,500 (2020)
- Council area: Fife
- Lieutenancy area: Fife
- Country: Scotland
- Sovereign state: United Kingdom
- Post town: Dunfermline
- Postcode district: KY12
- Dialling code: 01383
- Police: Scotland
- Fire: Scottish
- Ambulance: Scottish

Cairneyhill is a village in West Fife, Scotland. It is 3 miles west of Dunfermline, on the A994, and has a population of around 2,510 (2020)

The village's architecture is a mix of old weavers' cottages and modern suburban housing estates. The village is located north and west of the A985, a major trunk road that provides fast travel by car or bus to the Kincardine Bridge, the M90 Motorway and the Queensferry Crossing/Forth Road Bridge. Cairneyhill lies to the north of Crombie.

The Firth of Forth is located 1.5 miles south of Cairneyhill, which is 1 mile (1.6 km) west of Crossford.

== Amenities ==
Cairneyhill hosts a number of local businesses and other amenities. There are two shops, a garden centre, a petrol station, a number of housing estates, a guest house/ pub/restaurant, a primary school, a Scout hall, and a small industrial estate. There is a golf course, The Forrester Park Resort, which has two restaurants and a driving range.

== History ==
The name is Scots language for rocky hill, the village is, in fact, on a noticeable hill. Old maps before 1800 make little mention of the name, the area usually being marked as Pitdinny or Pitdinnie, which is still found in a local farm on the eastern edge, as well as an area of housing in the village.

The village grew in the 18th century as a settlement for local weavers and was served by the parish church that was built in 1752 and is still used today. This was a hotbed of dissenters and the village was a central point for the religious disputes in Scotland in the early 19th century.

There is a small bridge over the Torry Burn at the west end of the village known as the "Conscience Bridge". This name arises from local legend, in which a murderer was caught and confessed to his crime on the bridge and hanged himself. The line of the road has been straightened and widened over the years, with only the original north parapet remaining, but the name of the bridge is carved into a plaque which can be seen by leaning over the wall.

== Schools ==
Cairneyhill is served by Cairneyhill Primary School, which opened in its current location in July 1980 with 110 pupils, and as of 2014 had 372 pupils. It has 11 classrooms over 2 buildings. The Headteacher currently is Fiona Hall. On 8 December 2017, part of the school was destroyed by a fire. All of the pupils and staff were evacuated and there were no injuries.

== Burn ==
The Torry Burn runs through the village. There are seven bridges that cross the burn – four footbridges and three road bridges.
