= Haswell Plough =

Village in County Durham, England

Coordinates: 54°46.4′N 1°25.6′W

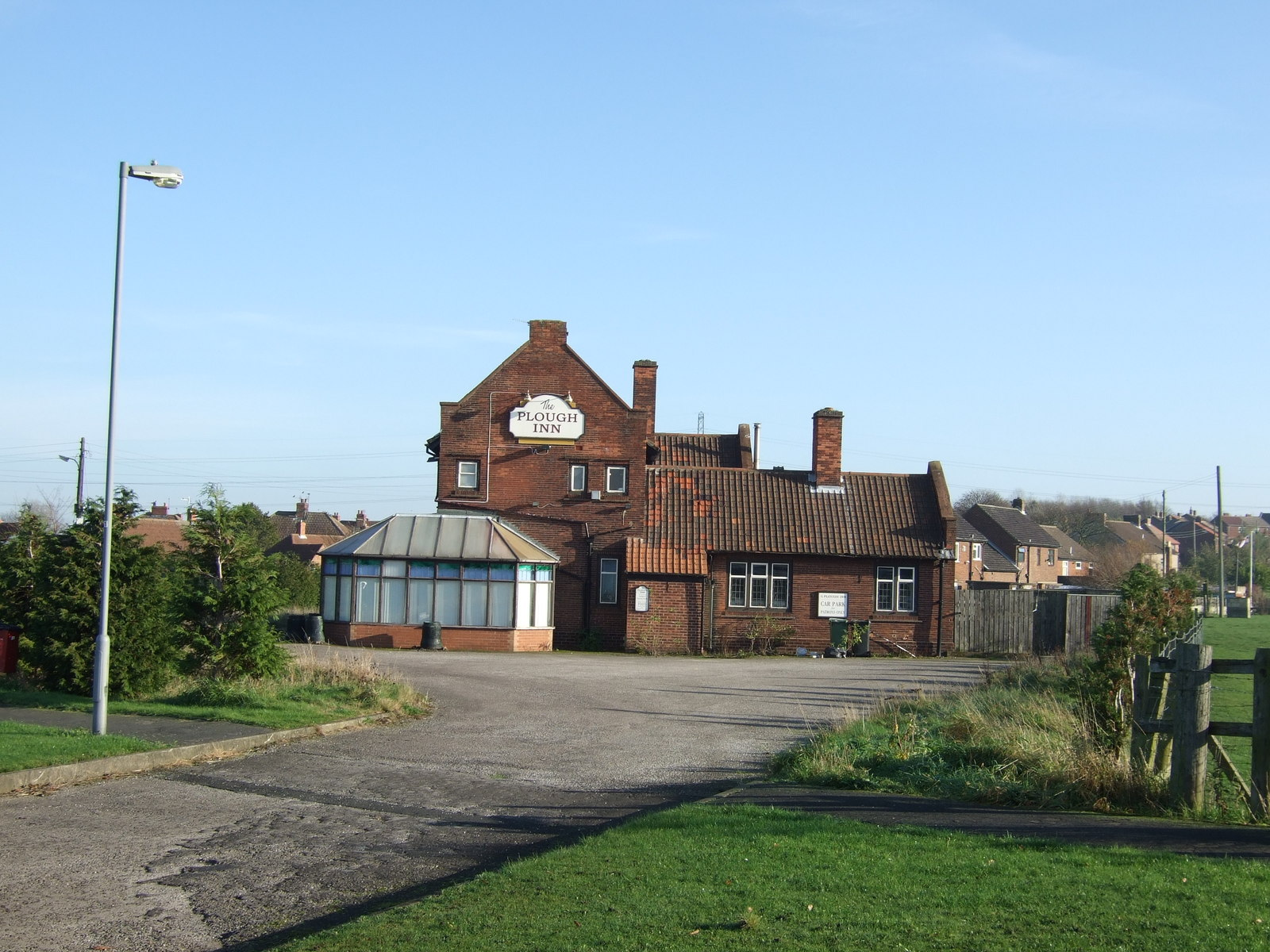
The Plough

Haswell Plough is a village in County Durham, England. It is situated between Durham and Peterlee, south of Haswell. Haswell Plough was first mentioned in the 12th century as being one of three parts of the village of Haswell. It is also the village where MEP of thirty years Stephen Hughes was brought up.
