= Charlestown, Fife =

Village in Fife, Scotland

Coordinates: 56°2′12″N 3°30′0″W

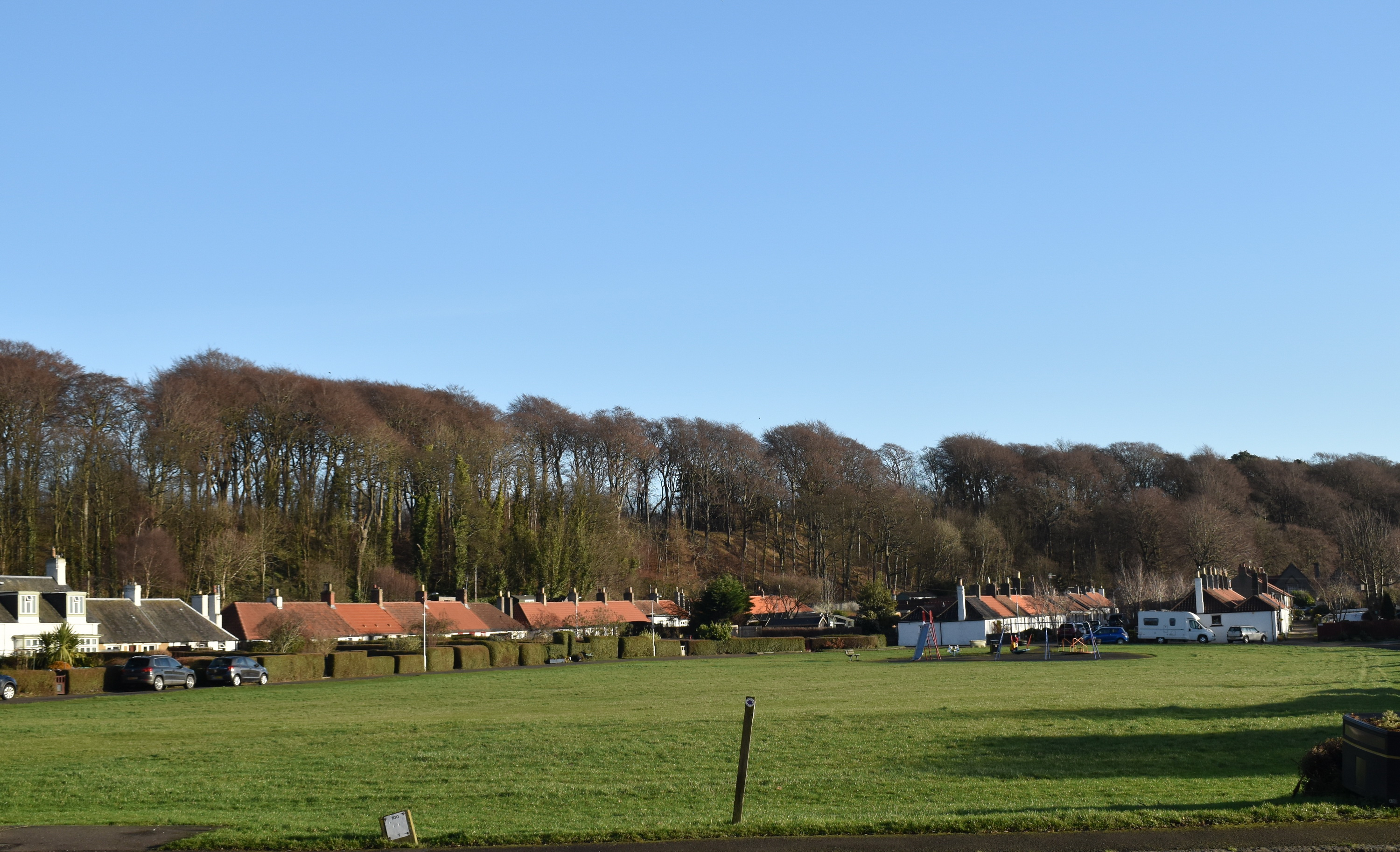
The Green, Charlestown

Charlestown (also known as Charlestown-on-Forth) is a village in Fife, Scotland. It lies on the north shore of the Firth of Forth, south-east of Crombie and around 1 mile (1.6 km) west of Limekilns, and 3 miles (5 km) south-west of Dunfermline. The village is known for its historic 18th century lime kilns and its Georgian planned housing.

== History ==
Charlestown was established in 1756 by Charles Bruce, 5th Earl of Elgin. The planned village is laid out in the shape of a letters C and E, for Charles Elgin. It was established as a harbour town for the shipment of coal mined on Lord Elgin's Fife estates, and for the production of lime. The harbour's outer basin was built around 1840. In 1887, on the occasion of Queen Victoria's Golden Jubilee, the Queen's Hall was built at the village centre, to designs by Robert Rowand Anderson.

Shipbuilding was carried on at Charlestown in the 19th century, as well as ship-breaking. Some of the German Imperial Fleet were brought here from Scapa Flow after World War I to be broken up.

== The Lime Kilns ==
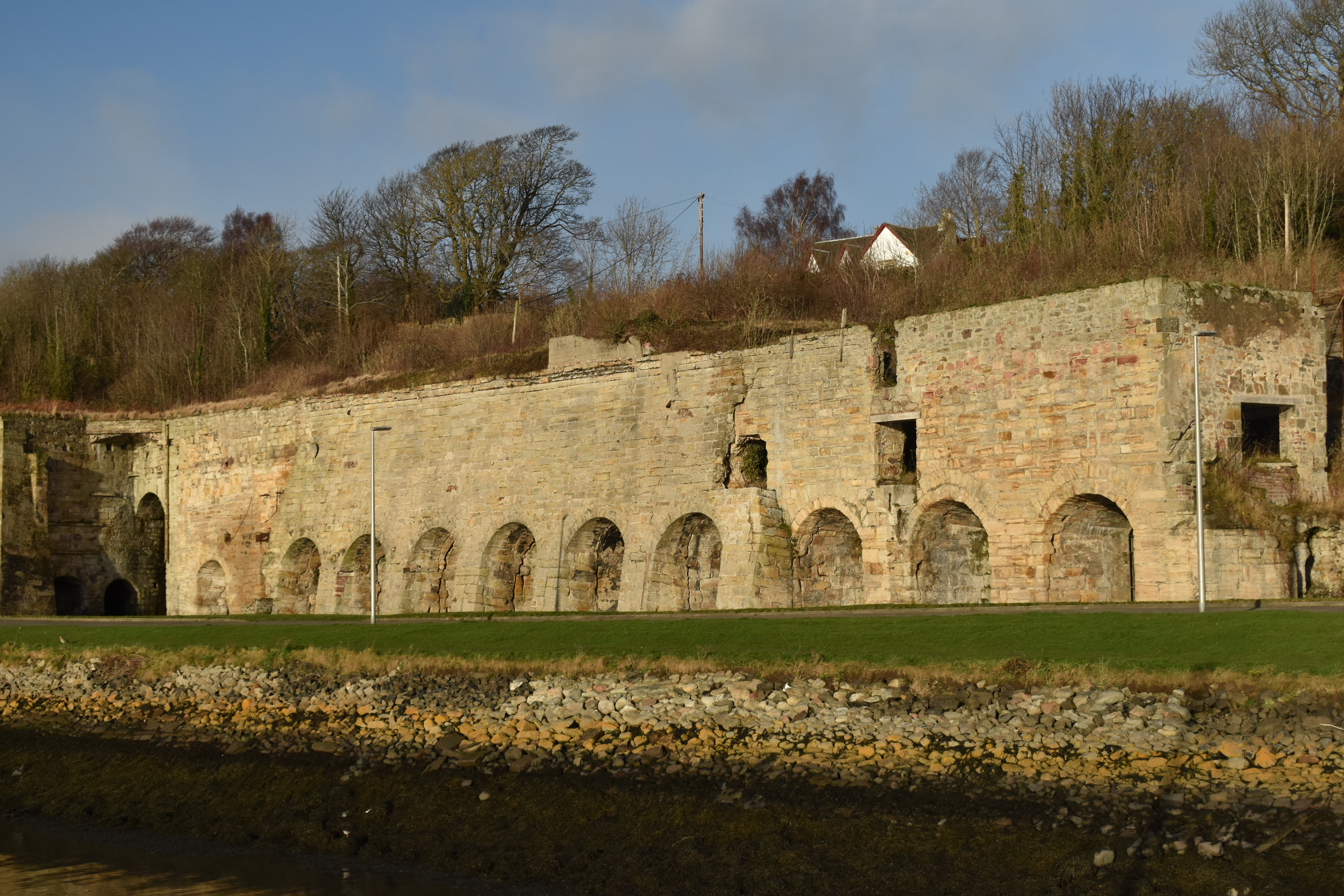
The Lime Kilns, view looking north, showing Kilns 1 to 11

The fourteen massive lime kilns built of dressed-sandstone are a remarkable feature of Charlestown. They are regarded as one of the most important Industrial Revolution remains in Scotland and indeed the United Kingdom, being Scottish Category A Listed buildings. Built into the hillside below the village, they form a stone facade 110 metres long by 10 metres high. They are in a generally stable state of preservation with many features relating to the operation of the kilns still in situ. Most of the kilns were re-faced, probably in the 19th century.

The kilns were built by Charles Bruce, 5th Earl of Elgin, in the late 18th century, building dates quoted vary, but Pevsner states that the first nine were built 1777 to 1778 and the last five in 1792. They were the largest group of lime kilns in Scotland, producing a third of all lime production, and were particularly important to agriculture for soil improvement but also for building work to produce mortar, plaster and other lime based products.

Through the late eighteenth and nineteenth centuries, the kilns were part of a major industrial complex of the time, including coal mining, ironworking and salt extraction. Coal and limestone were brought in from the local quarries, also on the Earl's estate. The adjacent harbour was as well built by the Earl and used for transporting the lime products, limestone and importantly coal. There were local railway lines, also a railway link to Dunfermline. Around the lime kilns there were many ancillary buildings, these have almost entirely gone. The operation ran down from the 1930s and finally closed in 1956. The site is owned by the Broomhall Estate.

== The Planned Village ==
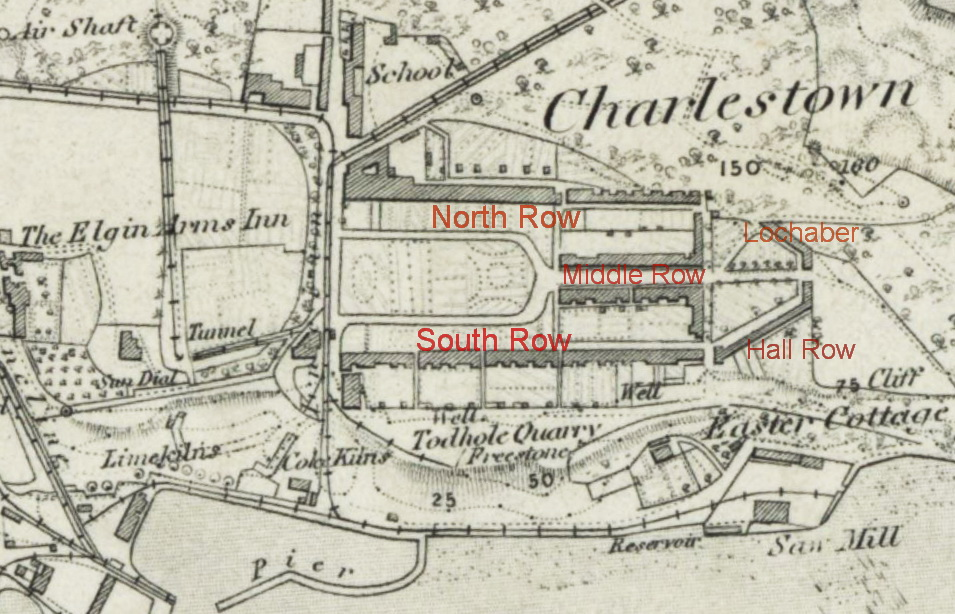
Ordnance Survey map, 6" to mile scale, 1856, with street names overlaid

Another distinctive feature of Charlestown is the early planned village, established again by Charles Bruce, the 5th Earl in 1756. It is however quite an unusual "plan", as the street pattern was reputedly laid out as the letters C and E, for Charles Elgin.

The village was part of the Improving Movement in Scotland that led to the establishment of some 500 planned villages and small towns throughout the country between the mid 18th century to mid 19th century, although McWilliam writing earlier in 1975 gives a lower figure for the same period of some 200 towns. Charlestown however has the distinction of perhaps being one of the first industrial villages in Scotland, as against the numerous farming and fishing based planned villages. This was because it encompassed not only the housing accommodation for the workers, but an integrated operation of coalmining, limestone quarrying, tramways, lime kilns, the harbour and other ancillary operations.

Building of the original village was commenced in 1756, and comprises the North Row, the South Row, the Double Row and also the shorter Hall Row and Lochaber to the east. The western half of the North and South Rows face the village green. Most house building was complete by 1771, although some houses were not completed until the early 19th century. The houses were originally single story, built in groups of six, some of them later extended to a second floor. As well, various other buildings were erected by the Earl, for example Easter Cottage built 1760, a school in 1768 and the Sutlery, being a stable and granary, in 1770.

The houses are all Scottish B Grade Listed Buildings (excepting nos 36,37 and 52 to 55) within the Charlestown Conservation Area. While all were originally "estate" cottages belonging to the Broomhall Estate, after the decline and closure of most of the works in 1935, many were sold to the tenants. The original unity and appearance of the terraces is now somewhat compromised by alterations to doors and windows, high privet hedges and by many rear extensions, as identified in the Conservation Plan.

== Paths ==
Some of the off-road paths in the village reflect aspects of the past; for example, "Shell Road" and "Lime Brae" indicate the routes over which these materials were transported in the past; "Craw Road" and "Rocks Road" refer to the avian inhabitants and the underfoot surface respectively; "The Run" refers to the route by which surplus water was run off from the upper part of the village and down to the sea.

== Cricket ==
Charlestown is the home of Broomhall Cricket Club, named after Broomhall, the nearby home of Lord Elgin. They have a 1st XI and a 2nd XI that play in the Scottish East League run by the East of Scotland Cricket Association and have junior, midweek and Sunday teams as well. They play at The Cairns, Charlestown.

== The Scottish Lime Centre ==
The Scottish Lime Centre Trust (SLCT) was established in 1994 by a pioneer in the re-introduction of lime in building repairs in Scotland, Pat Gibbons (Mrs Patricia). She was the founder and first Director, an architect with many years experience of building conservation in Scotland. Previously she had been a Senior Architect with Historic Scotland. The Director since 2005 is Roz Artis. Housed in an historic Charlestown building, the former Estate workshop, the Centre enjoys an international reputation for its work in promoting and training in the use of lime in building.

The aims and objectives of the Trust are to:

- Promote for the public benefit the appropriate repair of Scotland's traditional and historic buildings
- Advance education through the provision of advice, training and practical experience in the use of lime for the repair and conservation of such buildings
- Promote and further the preservation and development of Scottish building traditional, crafts and skills.
