= Kynoch (disambiguation) =

Kynoch was a British manufacturer of ammunition.

Kynoch may also refer to:

- Kynoch (surname)
- Kynoch, Ontario, Canada
- Kynoch Park, a football ground in Keith, Scotland
- Kynoch Press, English press in Witton, Birmingham
