= Baron Rockley =

Barony in the Peerage of the United Kingdom

Baron Rockley, of Lytchett Heath in the County of Dorset, is a title in the peerage of the United Kingdom, created on 11 January 1934 for the Conservative politician Sir Evelyn Cecil, who previously represented Hertfordshire East, Aston Manor and Birmingham Aston in the House of Commons.

As Sir Evelyn was the son of Lord Eustace Cecil, fourth son of the 2nd Marquess of Salisbury KG, the Barons Rockley are in remainder to the marquessate of Salisbury. The first Baron was married to the horticulturist the Hon. Alicia Amherst. As of 2024 the title is held by their great-grandson, the fourth Baron, who succeeded his father in 2011.

== Barons Rockley (1934) ==
- Evelyn Cecil, 1st Baron Rockley (1865–1941)
- Robert William Evelyn Cecil, 2nd Baron Rockley (1901–1976)
- Hugh Cecil, 3rd Baron Rockley (1934–2011)
- Anthony Robert Cecil, 4th Baron Rockley (b. 1961)

The heir apparent is the present baron's only son the Hon. William Evelyn Cecil (b. 1996).

== Arms ==
Coat of arms of Baron Rockley
Crest Six Arrows in saltire Or barbed and flighted Argent girt together with a Belt Gules buckled and garnished Gold over the Arrows a Morion Cap Proper. Escutcheon Barry of ten Argent and Azure over all six Escutcheons Sable three two and one each charged with a Lion rampant of the First and for difference a Crescent Gules charged with another Crescent Or. Supporters On either side a Lion Ermine gorged with a Collar Or pendent therefrom an Escutcheon the dexter Sable a Lion rampant Argent and the sinister Gules three Tilting Spears erect Or headed Argent. Motto Sero Sed Serio

== See also ==
- Marquess of Salisbury
- Marquess of Exeter
- Viscount Cecil of Chelwood
- Viscount Wimbledon
- Baron Quickswood
- Baron Amherst of Hackney
