= Rockley =

Rockley may refer to:

== People ==
- Ann Rockley, Canadian technical communicator
- Rockley Wilson (1879–1957), English cricketer

== Places ==
- Rockley, New South Wales, a small village in Australia
- Rockley, Barbados, a resort
- Rockley, Nova Scotia, Canada, a small community
- Rockley, Nottinghamshire, a hamlet in England
- Rockley, Wiltshire, a hamlet in England

== Other uses ==
- Baron Rockley, a title in the Peerage of the United Kingdom

== See also ==
- Rockley Park, a caravan park in Hamworthy, Dorset, England
- Rocklea, a suburb in Brisbane, Queensland, Australia
- Rocklea Station, a pastoral lease in the Pilbara region of Western Australia
- Rockleigh, New Jersey, a borough in the United States
