= 1963 Dundee West by-election =

UK parliamentary by-election

The 1963 Dundee West by-election was held on 21 November 1963 due to the death of the incumbent Labour MP John Strachey. It was won by the Labour candidate, Peter Doig.

== Background ==
Dundee West had been held by the Labour Party since its creation in 1950. In 1959, the Unionist candidate Robert Taylor had reduced the Labour majority to just 714 votes, thereby coming close to a surprise victory. The 43 year-old Dr. Taylor was selected again as the Unionist and National Liberal candidate. The Communist Party selected fifty year-old Dave Bowman, a local engine driver who had contested the seat at the previous three elections.

On 22 September 1963, local councillor Peter Doig was chosen ahead of five other people to be the Labour Party candidate. Doig, a bakery supervisor, was chairman of the Labour group on Dundee Town Council. He was also deputy chairman of the council and honorary city treasurer of Dundee. The short list of six had been drawn up from a field of at least ten candidates. This included three other Dundee-based aspirants, one of whom was Doig's fellow councillor Bailie James L. Stewart.

The Scottish National Party selected James C. Lees and were reported to have high hopes of achieving a good result following their strong showing in the West Lothian by-election the previous year.

== Result ==
Dundee West by-election, 1963
Party	Candidate	Votes	%	±%
Labour	Peter Doig	22,449	50.56	+0.92
Unionist	Robert R. Taylor	17,494	39.40	−8.87
SNP	James C. Lees	3,285	7.40	New
Communist	Dave Bowman	1,170	2.64	+0.55
Majority		4,955	11.16	+9.81
Turnout		44,398	71.6	−11.3
Labour hold		Swing		

After his victory Doig declared that Alec Douglas-Home's claim of a new chapter following his victory in the recent Kinross and Western Perthshire by-election was now a closed book and predicted the Conservatives’ hopes of holding their seats at the forthcoming St Marylebone and Dumfries contests were in danger. He also called on Home to call a general election.
