= George Kynoch =

George Kynoch may refer to:

- George Kynoch (businessman) (1834–1891), founder of IMI plc, Conservative Member of Parliament (MP) for Aston Manor
- George Kynoch (Kincardine and Deeside MP) (born 1946), Scottish Conservative Party MP

== See also ==
- Kynoch (surname)
