= Alicia Amherst =

English horticulturist, botanist (1865–1941)

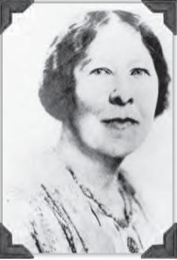
- Born: Alicia Margaret Tyssen Amherst; 30 July 1865; Poole, Dorset, England
- Died: 14 September 1941 (aged 76); Poole, Dorset, England
- Occupations: Horticulturist; botanist; writer
- Spouse: Evelyn Cecil, 1st Baron Rockley
- Relatives: William Tyssen-Amherst, 1st Baron Amherst of Hackney (father)
- Writing career
- Pen name: Mrs. Evelyn Cecil; Lady Rockley of Lytchett Heath; Baroness Rockley
- Language: English
- Subjects: horticulture, gardening history
- Notable work: The History of Gardening in England (1896)

Alicia Margaret Tyssen Amherst, Baroness Rockley CBE GCStJ (30 July 1865 – 14 September 1941) was an English horticulturist, botanist, and author of the first scholarly account of English gardening history.

== Family and personal life ==
Alicia Amherst was born in 1865 in Poole, Dorset, one of seven daughters of William Tyssen-Amherst, 1st Baron Amherst of Hackney, who was later the Conservative Member of Parliament for West Norfolk. Her mother, Margaret Susan Mitford, was an avid gardener and gave Amherst her own plot to care for at the age of ten. Her interest in history was spurred by access to her father's large library.

In 1898, she married Evelyn Cecil and gained the second of the names under which she would publish, Mrs Evelyn Cecil. They had three children. Evelyn Cecil, a Conservative Member of Parliament, was knighted and, in 1934, raised to the peerage as Baron Rockley, so she became Lady Rockley of Lytchett Heath and then the dowager Baroness Rockley, two more names under which she would publish.

She died in Poole in 1941.

== Writing ==
Amherst became known for her first and still most famous book, The History of Gardening in England (1895), published under the name Alicia M. T. Amherst. Unexpectedly for its author, it was a huge and immediate success. For the second edition, which was contracted within a month of the first, Amherst received ten times the amount she had been offered for the first.

At the time, most gardening books were practical handbooks, and Amherst was the first writer to take a careful look at the history of gardening in England, going back much further in time than other gardening writers did. Indeed, she led the first wave of writing about Euro-American garden history, with well-known works such as Rose Standish Nichols' English Pleasure Gardens following in 1902 and Marie-Luise Gothein's A History of Garden Art in 1913. Amherst never became nearly as popular or influential a writer on gardening. But with its footnotes and in-depth annotated bibliography, The History of Gardening in England became the authoritative work in its field and remains of value to historians today. Amherst wrote several more books, including one for children after she became a mother: Children's Gardens (1902). Her London Parks and Gardens (1907) is the first serious and deeply informed book on London's open spaces. Amherst wrote a number of scholarly papers on garden history, as well as growing unusual plants in her own garden and collecting specimens on trips abroad for Kew Gardens.

=== Books ===
London Parks and Gardens (1907)

- The History of Gardening in England (1896, as Alicia M. T. Amherst)
- Children's Gardens (1902, as the Hon'ble Mrs. Evelyn Cecil)
- London Parks and Gardens (1907, as the Hon'ble Mrs. Evelyn Cecil; with illustrations by Lady Victoria Manners)
- Children and Gardens (1908)
- Wild Flowers of the Great Dominions of the British Empire (Macmillan, 1935, as the Lady Rockley)
- Some Canadian Wildflowers: Being the First Part of Wild Flowers of the Great Dominions of the British Empire (1937, as Lady Rockley)
- Historic Gardens of England (1938, as Mrs. Evelyn Cecil)

== Other botanical and horticultural activities ==
Amherst's collecting expeditions took her to Mozambique and South Africa (1899), Rhodesia (1900), and Ceylon (now Sri Lanka), New Zealand, Australia, and Canada (1927).

This was a period when horticultural schools were being founded in England, and Amherst advocated on behalf of women entering the field. Amherst spoke at Swanley Horticultural College in 1902.

Amherst was also known as a fine artist of botanical and other subjects. In 1900, her husband published On the Eve of the War: A Narrative of Impressions During a Journey in Cape Colony, the Free State, the Transvaal, Natal, and Rhodesia and several of its illustrations were from sketches or photographs by Amherst.

She took part in a campaign to save the Chelsea Physic Garden, a London garden dating back to 1673. She sat on its management committee, and the garden now holds her archive.

== Honours and legacy ==
Amherst was made a Member of the Order of the British Empire in 1918. She was the only woman to receive the Freedom of the Worshipful Company of Gardeners, a London livery company (a kind of trade association or guild) that was chartered in 1605.

The plant Hebe 'Alicia Amherst'—a purple-flowered cultivar synonymous with H. veitchii as well as a plant species Kaempferia ceciliae N.E.Br. (family Zingiberaceae) —were named after her.

A first biography, The Well-Connected Gardener: A Biography of Alicia Amherst, Founder of Garden History, was published in 2010.
