= Hardingham =

Civil parish in Norfolk, England

Coordinates: 52.59469°N 1.01667°E

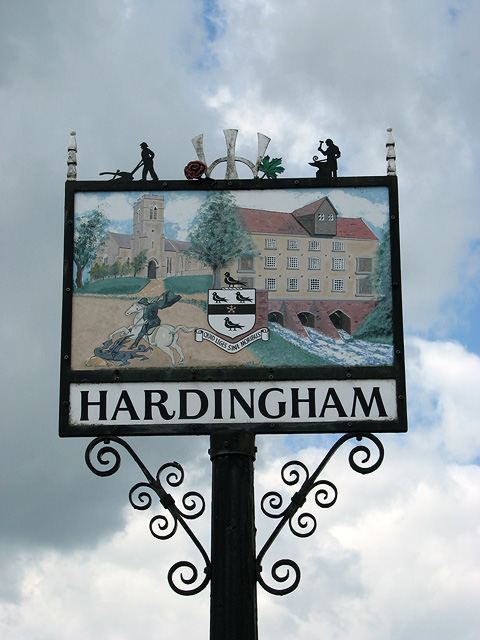
- Hardingham Village Sign

- Location within Norfolk
- Area: 3.78 sq mi (9.8 km^{2})
- Population: 335 (2021 census)
  - Density: 89/sq mi (34/km^{2})
- OS grid reference: TG044039
- Civil parish: Hardingham
- District: Breckland
- Shire county: Norfolk
- Region: East
- Country: England
- Sovereign state: United Kingdom
- Post town: NORWICH
- Postcode district: NR9
- Dialling code: 01953
- Police: Norfolk
- Fire: Norfolk
- Ambulance: East of England
- UK Parliament: Mid Norfolk
- Website: https://hardinghamparish.wixsite.com/home

Hardingham is a civil parish in the English county of Norfolk. The civil parish also includes the hamlet of Danemoor Green, located about one mile north-east of the village.

Hardingham is located 4.5 miles (7.2 km) north-west of Wymondham and 12 miles (19 km) west of Norwich.

== History ==
Hardingham's name is of Anglo-Saxon origin and derives from the Old English for the homestead of Hearda's people.

Hardingham is not recorded in the Domesday Book.

The parish also includes the location of the medieval settlement of Flockthorpe, which was probably abandoned due to the ravages of the Black Death.

In the 16th century, Sir Thomas Gresham built a moated residence in Hardingham.

Hardingham Watermill is first recorded in 1766 and was eventually closed in 1933. The mill building was burnt down in 1966 as part of the film The Shuttered Room starring Oliver Reed, despite a last minute intervention by Sir Ian Gilmour MP.

Hardingham railway station opened in 1847 as a stop on the Wymondham-Dereham Railway Line. The station closed to passengers in 1969 but still operates periodically on the Mid-Norfolk Railway.

== Geography ==
According to the 2021 census, Hardingham has a population of 335 people which shows an increase from the 267 people recorded in the 2011 census.

== St George's Church ==
Hardingham's parish church is dedicated to Saint George and dates from the 13th century. St George's is located outside of the village on Church Road and has been Grade I listed since 1960. The church holds sporadic church services and is part of the Barnham Broom & Upper Yare Benefice.

St George's holds a memorial to Major William Mordaunt Marsh Edwards VC who lived in the parish and was awarded the Victoria Cross in the Anglo-Egyptian War as well as several original battlefield crosses from the First World War.

== Governance ==
Hardingham is part of the electoral ward of Mattishall for local elections and is part of the district of Breckland.

The village's national constituency is Mid Norfolk which has been represented by the Conservative's George Freeman MP since 2010.

== War Memorial ==
Hardingham's war memorial is an elaborate wooden memorial in St George's Church which lists the following names for the First World War:

Rank	Name	Unit	Date of death	Burial/Commemoration
Lt.	Geoffrey S. Walley	5th Bn., King's Royal Rifle Corps	20 Aug. 1916	Dernancourt Cemetery
2Lt.	Frederick Abel	3rd Bn., Norfolk Regiment	30 Dec. 1917	Chatby War Cemetery
CSt.	John W. Brown	HMS Formidable	1 Jan. 1915	Chatham Naval Memorial
Sgt.	Arthur W. Whitehand	H.T., Army Service Corps	3 May 1917	St George's Churchyard
LCpl.	John T. Abel	4th Bn., Machine Gun Guards	27 Mar. 1918	Cabaret Rouge Cemetery
Pte.	Wilfred J. Fox	4th Bn., Bedfordshire Regiment	30 Sep. 1918	Sunken Road Cemetery
Pte.	Arthur S. Adcock	6th Bn., Royal Dublin Fusiliers	12 Oct. 1916	Thiepval Memorial
Pte.	John T. Scase	10th Bn., Essex Regiment	22 Oct. 1916	Thiepval Memorial
Pte.	Arthur Websdale	1st Bn., King's Own Royal Regiment	17 Apr. 1918	Loos Memorial
Pte.	Frank Hunt	8th Bn., Leicestershire Regiment	22 Mar. 1918	Épehy Wood Cemetery
Pte.	Charles H. Balaam	4th Bn., Norfolk Regiment	20 Apr. 1917	Deir al-Balah Cemetery
Pte.	Ernest D. Risebrook	4th Bn., Norfolk Regt.	27 Jul. 1917	St George's Churchyard
Pte.	Alfred J. Chaplin	7th Bn., Norfolk Regt.	14 Oct. 1917	Arras Memorial
Pte.	Harry A. Egle	8th Bn., Norfolk Regt.	10 Mar. 1917	Aveluy Cemetery
Pte.	Bertie W. Adcock	4th Bn., Northumberland Fusiliers	15 Nov. 1916	Thiepval Memorial
Pte.	Alfred Hunt	11th Bn., Royal Sussex Regiment	31 Jul. 1917	Menin Gate

The following names were added after the Second World War:

Rank	Name	Unit	Date of death	Burial/Commemoration
Lt.	William B. M. Edwards	1st Bn., Rifle Brigade	26 Mar. 1943	Sfax War Cemetery
Sgt.	William A. Winchester	4th Bn., Queen's Own Regiment	15 Jul. 1940	Malbork Cemetery
LCpl.	Horace F. Mann	4th Bn., Royal Norfolk Regiment	2 Aug. 1943	Kranji War Memorial
LAC	Stanley C. Warnes	Royal Air Force Volunteer Reserve	17 May 1943	St George's Churchyard
Dvr.	Victor C. Goldson	221 Coy., Royal Engineers	26 Aug. 1943	Enfidaville Cemetery
Pte.	William A. James	4th Bn., Royal Norfolk Regiment	20 Jun. 1943	Kanchanaburi Cemetery
Pte.	Ernest H. Websdale	5th Bn., Royal Norfolks	17 Mar. 1945	Kranji War Cemetery
