= 1939 Birmingham Aston by-election =

UK parliamentary by-election

The 1939 Birmingham Aston by-election was a parliamentary by-election held on 17 May 1939 for the British House of Commons constituency of Birmingham Aston.

== Background ==
Arthur Hope, who served as Birmingham Aston's Member of Parliament since 1931, gave up his seat after being appointed Governor of Madras in 1939. He assumed office as governor in March 1940.

=== Previous result ===
General election, 14 November 1935
| Party | Candidate | Votes | % | ±% |
|---|---|---|---|---|
| Conservative | Arthur Hope | 18,933 | 68.8 | −2.1 |
| Labour | Rudolph Putnam Messel | 8,578 | 31.2 | +12.0 |
| Majority | | 10,355 | 37.6 | −14.1 |
| Turnout | | 27,511 | 64.5 | −9.0 |
| Conservative hold | | Swing | | |

== Candidates ==
- Edward Kellett - A lieutenant in the Sherwood Rangers Yeomanry.
- Samuel Segal - Physician and son of Moshe Zvi Segal.

== Result ==
Birmingham Aston, by-election 1939
| Party | Candidate | Votes | % | ±% |
|---|---|---|---|---|
| Conservative | Edward Kellett | 12,033 | 66.3 | −2.5 |
| Labour | Samuel Segal | 6,122 | 33.7 | +2.5 |
| Majority | | 5,911 | 32.6 | −5.0 |
| Turnout | | 18,155 | | |
| Conservative hold | | Swing | | |

== Aftermath ==
Kellett sat until killed on active service in 1943. The Conservatives also held the ensuing by-election.

General election, 5 July 1945
| Party | Candidate | Votes | % | ±% |
|---|---|---|---|---|
| Labour | Woodrow Wyatt | 15,031 | 61.9 | +30.7 |
| Conservative | F.B. Normansell | 9,264 | 38.1 | −30.7 |
| Majority | | 5,767 | 23.8 | N/A |
| Turnout | | 24,295 | 67.75 | +3.2 |
| Labour gain from Conservative | | Swing | | |
