= Evelyn Cecil, 1st Baron Rockley =

British politician (1865–1941)

The Right Honourable The Lord Rockley GBE PC
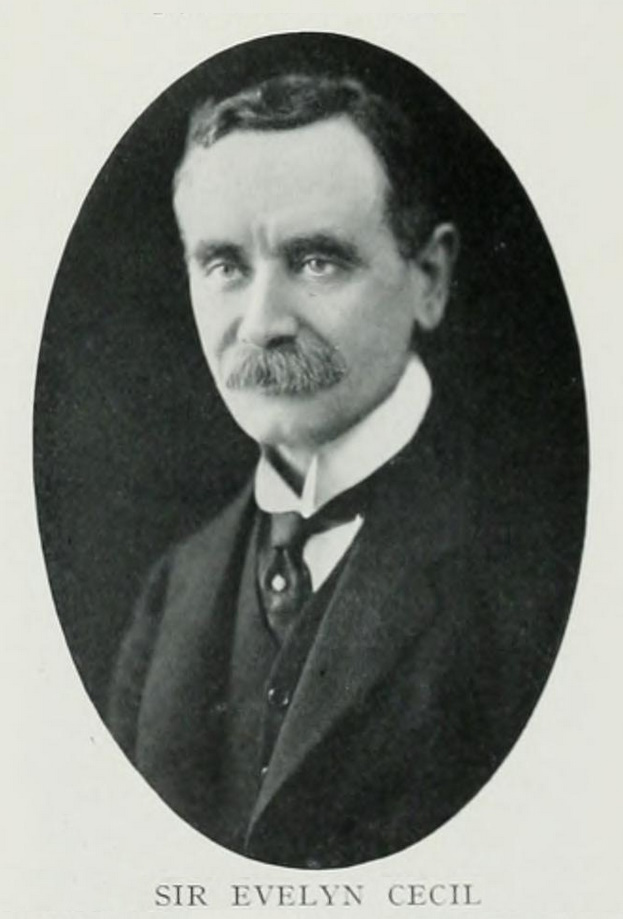
- Sir Evelyn Cecil (in about 1922)

Member of Parliament for Birmingham Aston Aston Manor (1910–1918)
- In office 26 September 1900 – 30 May 1929
- Preceded by: George Grice-Hutchinson
- Succeeded by: John Strachey

Member of Parliament for Hertford
- In office 22 June 1898 – 26 September 1900
- Preceded by: Abel Smith
- Succeeded by: Abel Henry Smith

Personal details
- Born: 30 May 1865 London, England, UK
- Died: 1 April 1941 (aged 75) Poole, Dorset, England, UK
- Party: Conservative
- Spouse: Alicia Amherst (m. 1898–1941)
- Relations: James Gascoyne-Cecil (grandfather); William Tyssen-Amherst (father-in-law); Sir Robert Cecil (cousin); Arthur Balfour (cousin)
- Children: 3; Robert William Evelyn; Margaret Gertrude Cecil; Maud Katharine Alicia Cecil
- Parent: Lord Eustace Cecil (father)
- Education: Eton College
- Alma mater: New College, Oxford

Evelyn Cecil, 1st Baron Rockley (30 May 1865 – 1 April 1941), was a British Conservative Party politician.

== Early life and career ==
Evelyn Cecil was born in the parish of St George's, Hanover Square in the heart of London's Mayfair, the eldest son of Lord Eustace Cecil, grandson of James Gascoyne-Cecil, 2nd Marquess of Salisbury, and cousin of both Sir Robert Cecil and Arthur Balfour.

He was educated at Eton before going up to New College, Oxford. Cecil was Private Secretary from 1891 to 1892, to the Prime Minister, his uncle, Robert Gascoyne-Cecil, 3rd Marquess of Salisbury, during the latter's second term and during his third term from 1895 to 1902.

Cecil was a director of the London and South Western Railway company. He was the chairman of various investment trust companies and deputy chairman of the Clerical, Medical and General Life Assurance Society.

== Political career ==
Cecil served as a Member of Parliament from 1898 to 1929 and was appointed a Knight Grand Cross of the Order of the British Empire (GBE) in the 1922 New Year Honours. He was raised to the Peerage on 11 January 1934 as Baron Rockley, of Lytchett Heath, in the County of Dorset.

== Personal life ==
On 16 February 1898, Cecil married the Hon. Alicia Amherst (a garden historian and daughter of William Tyssen-Amherst, 1st Baron Amherst of Hackney), having three children: Robert William Evelyn, later 2nd Baron Rockley (28 February 1901 – 26 January 1976), Margaret Gertrude (27 November 1898 – 26 August 1962) and Maud Katharine Alicia (21 November 1904 – 12 June 1981).

Lord Rockley died in 1941 in Poole in Dorset, aged 75.

== Arms ==
Coat of arms of Evelyn Cecil, 1st Baron Rockley
Crest Six arrows in saltire Or barbed and flighted Argent girt together with a belt Gules buckled and garnished Gold over the arrows a morion cap Proper. Escutcheon Barry of ten Argent and Azure over all six escutcheons Sable three two and one each charged with a lion rampant of the first and for difference a crescent Gules charged with another crescent Or. Supporters On either side a lion Ermine gorged with a collar Or pendent therefrom an escutcheon the dexter Sable a lion rampant Argnet and the sinister Gules three tilting spears erect Or headed Argent. Motto Sero Sed Serio

Parliament of the United Kingdom
Preceded by Abel Smith	Member of Parliament for Hertford; 1898–1900	Succeeded by Abel Henry Smith
Preceded by George Grice-Hutchinson	Member of Parliament for Aston Manor; 1900–1918	constituency renamed
New constituency	Member of Parliament for Birmingham Aston; 1918–1929	Succeeded by John Strachey
Peerage of the United Kingdom
New creation	Baron Rockley; 1934–1941	Succeeded by Robert Cecil
