= George Grice-Hutchinson =

British Conservative politician

Member of Parliament for Aston Manor
- In office March 20, 1891 – October 1, 1900
- Preceded by: George Kynoch
- Succeeded by: Sir Evelyn Cecil

Personal details
- Born: 1848
- Died: 18 May 1906 (aged 58)
- Party: Conservative

George William Grice-Hutchinson (c. 1848 – 18 May 1906) was a British Conservative politician who served as Member of Parliament for Aston Manor in Warwickshire from a by-election in 1891 to 1900, when he stood down.

The son of Captain G. R. Hutchinson, RE, George Hutchinson was educated at Rugby School and University College. He entered the British Army in 1871, served with the 40th Foot Regiment, and served in the Anglo-Zulu War of 1879. He retired as a captain in 1881.

In 1885, he assumed the additional name of Grice.
