= Redvers Prior =

Commander Redvers Michael Prior, DSO, DSC, (29 September 1893 – 4 November 1964) was a Conservative Member of Parliament, representing Birmingham Aston from 1943 to 1945, and an officer in the Royal Navy.

== Military career ==
Prior joined the Navy as a midshipman in January 1912, and was promoted to acting sub-lieutenant in May 1914, substantive sub-lieutenant in January 1915, and full lieutenant in July 1916, in which rank he was serving at the end of the war. He was promoted to lieutenant-commander in 1924, and later retired from the Navy.

In February 1940 he returned to active service in command of the anti-submarine trawler Angle (FY 201), and then the trawler Ruby (T 24) from March to May. He then saw service at the Dunkirk evacuation, for which he was awarded the Distinguished Service Cross in June 1940.

In August 1942 he participated in the Dieppe Raid, as the senior naval beachmaster on one of the five landing beaches. He was severely wounded during the fighting, and taken prisoner. Near the Belgian-German border he escaped from a hospital train, making his way to the coast and observing the construction of the Atlantic Wall. He made contact with the maquis on his arrival in Paris, and attempted to head south and leave France through Marseille, in the Vichy zone. He was, however, recaptured, and imprisoned in Grenoble in the winter of 1942/43. Here, he met Donald Caskie, who helped him escape to the United Kingdom. On his return to England, in March 1943, he was made a Companion of the Distinguished Service Order.

He returned to active service after his recuperation, and during the North West Europe Campaign he was mentioned in despatches for service in the Normandy landings, and was awarded a bar to the Distinguished Service Cross for his part in Operation Infatuate, the capture of Walcheren.

== Parliament ==
Here in this country we have thousands of men who are straining at the leash to make an assault and are impatient to get to grips with the enemy. When we make our assault on this Western wall we will require all our skill and all our experience. Let us get that skill by seeking out the enemy, by hammering him incessantly, by assaulting him in every direction and playing on his nerves, not only by words but by deeds. [...] When I was walking through France I was continually asked questions by working men and women who aided me at the risk not only of their own lives but the lives of their families as well. I was asked, "When is your Prime Minister going to speak to us again? His words hearten us and give us strength to endure." I was asked also, "What do you in Great Britain think of France now? When are you coming to help us?"

— Maiden speech of Redvers Prior MP, 22 September 1942.

Prior was elected to Parliament at the Birmingham Aston by-election in June 1943, shortly after his return to the UK. He succeeded Edward Kellett, who had been killed in action in North Africa that March; as a result of the war-time electoral pact, Labour and the Liberals did not stand candidates, and Prior was only opposed by a candidate of the Common Wealth Party as well as a local independent. His maiden speech, in which he described his experiences in France and called for continuing raids on the continent, was well received and widely reported. Due to his military service he only spoke twice more in 1943 and 1944, but became a more active member in 1945, particularly on military matters. He held the seat for the Conservative Party until the 1945 general election, when he contested Stratford West Ham, a safe Labour seat, and lost.

After service in Parliament, he was a member of Kent County Council in 1949, and later retired to Saint Lawrence, Jersey, where he died in 1964.
