= Dundee West (UK Parliament constituency) =

Parliamentary constituency in the United Kingdom, 1950 onwards

Coordinates: 56°30′15″N 3°05′05″W

- Former burgh constituency for the House of Commons
- Boundary of Dundee West in Scotland
- Subdivision: Angus/Dundee City
- Major settlements: Dundee

1950–2024
- Created from: Dundee
- Replaced by: Dundee Central

Dundee West was a constituency of the House of Commons of the Parliament of the United Kingdom. It elected one Member of Parliament (MP) by the first-past-the-post voting system.

The constituency was created for the 1950 general election, when the two-seat Dundee constituency was split into two single seat constituencies: Dundee East and Dundee West.

Further to the completion of the 2023 periodic review of Westminster constituencies, the seat was subject to boundary changes, gaining further parts of the Dundee City council area. As a consequence, it was renamed Dundee Central, and was first contested at the 2024 general election.

== Boundaries ==
Map of boundaries 2005-2024

1950–1974: The County of the City of Dundee wards numbers 2, 3, 6, 7, 8, and 9.

1974–1983: The County of the City of Dundee wards of Balgay, Camperdown, Downfield, Law, Lochee, and Riverside. The constituency boundaries remained unchanged.

1983–1997: The City of Dundee District electoral divisions of Ardler/Blackside, Central/Riverside, Downfield/St Mary's, Dudhope/Logie, Gourdie/Pitalpin, Law/Ancrum, Lochee, Menziehill/Ninewells, Rockwell/Fairmuir, and Trottick/Gillburn.

1997–2005: The City of Dundee District electoral divisions of Central, Charleston, Kingsway West, Kirkton, Law, Lochee, Ninewells, Riverside, and St Mary's.

2005–2024: The part of the Dundee City council area other than the Dundee East Burgh Constituency and the Angus Council ward of Sidlaw West.

The constituency was one of two covering the Dundee City council area, the other being Dundee East. Final boundaries were first used in the 2005 general election.

As well as covering a western portion of the city area, the West constituency also included, to the north and west, part of the Angus council area. Similarly, the east constituency included, to the north and east, another part of the Angus council area.

Prior to the 2005 election, both constituencies were entirely within the city area, and the north-eastern and north-western areas of the city were within the Angus constituency. Scottish Parliament constituencies retain the older boundaries.

== Politics and history of the constituency ==
Dundee West was held by the Labour Party from the first time it was contested in 1950 until the 2015 general election. Initially it was more marginal than its neighbour Dundee East. Additionally the Labour candidate always polled more than 50% of the votes cast in these contests. However, in 1959 Labour's majority over Conservative candidate was only 714 votes. This majority greatly increased at the 1963 by-election and by 1970, Labour's majority and share of the vote in Dundee West was better than the same figures in Dundee East.

Labour's majority was reduced in 2005 by the SNP candidate Joe Fitzpatrick despite changes to the boundaries which should have favoured Labour; suggesting that the constituency might be becoming more marginal, although the gap widened again in 2010. The last MP was Chris Law, who was the first-ever MP from the Scottish National Party elected for Dundee West; as part of the party's near-clean sweep of the majority of Scottish seats at that year's general election.

== Members of Parliament ==
Election	Member	Party
1950	John Strachey	Labour
1963 by-election	Peter Doig	Labour
1979	Ernie Ross	Labour
2005	Jim McGovern	Labour
2015	Chris Law	SNP

== Election results ==
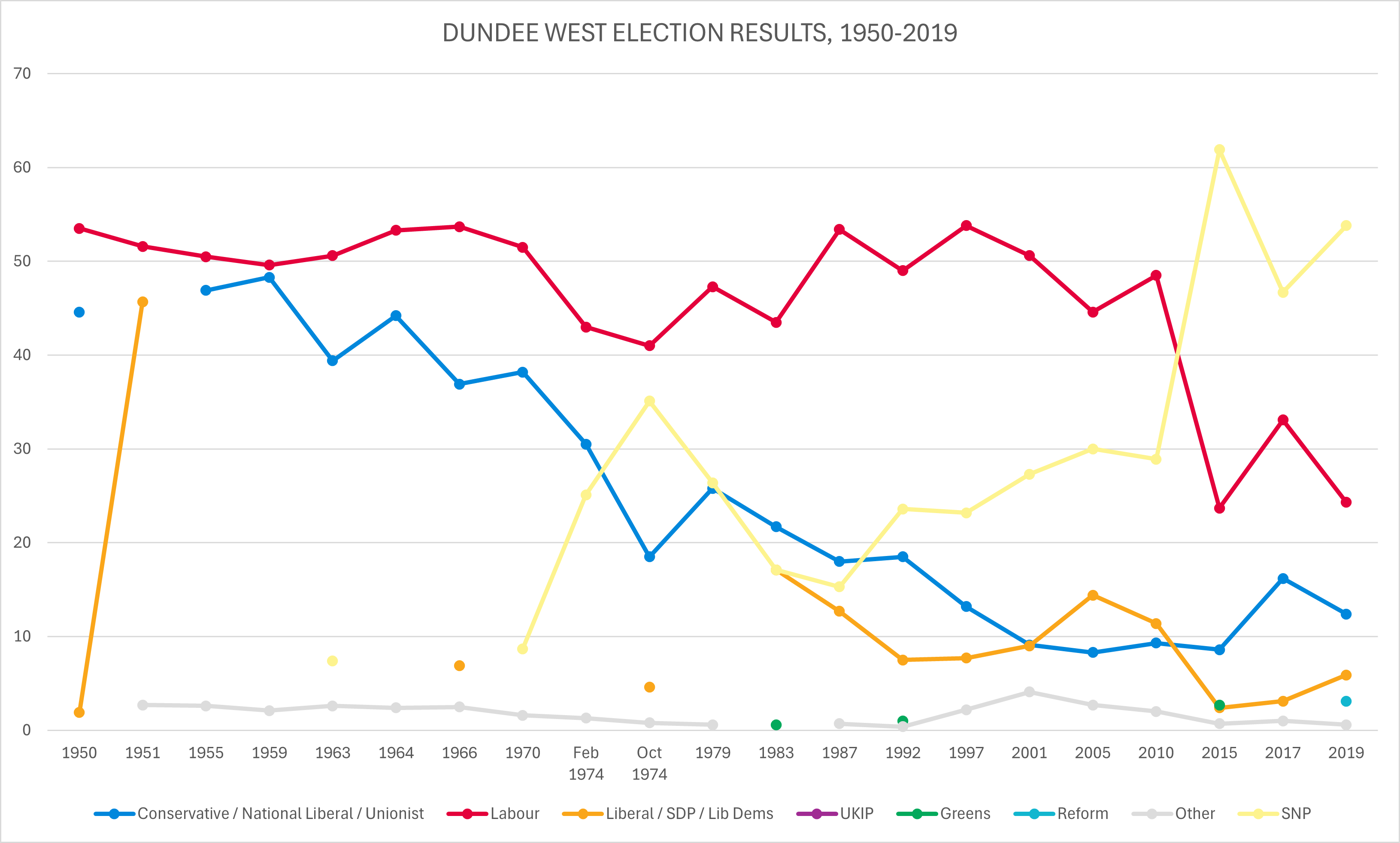
Election results 1950-2019

=== Elections in the 2010s ===
General election 2019: Dundee West
Party	Candidate	Votes	%	±%
SNP	Chris Law	22,355	53.8	+7.1
Labour	Jim Malone	10,096	24.3	−8.8
Conservative	Tess White	5,149	12.4	−3.8
Liberal Democrats	Daniel Coleman	2,468	5.9	+2.8
Brexit Party	Stuart Waiton	1,271	3.1	New
CPA	Quinta Arrey	240	0.6	New
Majority		12,259	29.5	+15.9
Turnout		41,579	64.5	+2.8
SNP hold		Swing	+7.1	

General election 2017: Dundee West
Party	Candidate	Votes	%	±%
SNP	Chris Law	18,045	46.7	−15.2
Labour	Alan Cowan	12,783	33.1	+9.4
Conservative	Darren Cormack	6,257	16.2	+7.6
Liberal Democrats	Jenny Blain	1,189	3.1	+0.7
Independent	Sean Dobson	403	1.0	New
Majority		5,262	13.6	−24.6
Turnout		38,677	61.7	−6.1
SNP hold		Swing	-12.3	

General election 2015: Dundee West
Party	Candidate	Votes	%	±%
SNP	Chris Law	27,684	61.9	+33.0
Labour	Michael Marra	10,592	23.7	−24.8
Conservative	Nicola Ross	3,852	8.6	−0.7
Green	Pauline Hinchion	1,225	2.7	New
Liberal Democrats	Daniel Coleman	1,057	2.4	−9.0
TUSC	Jim McFarlane	304	0.7	−0.3
Majority		17,092	38.2	N/A
Turnout		44,714	67.8	+8.9
SNP gain from Labour		Swing	+28.9	

General election 2010: Dundee West
Party	Candidate	Votes	%	±%
Labour	Jim McGovern	17,994	48.5	+3.9
SNP	Jim Barrie	10,716	28.9	−1.1
Liberal Democrats	John Barnett	4,233	11.4	−3.0
Conservative	Colin Stewart	3,461	9.3	+1.0
Independent	Andy McBride	365	1.0	New
TUSC	Jim McFarlane	357	1.0	New
Majority		7,278	19.6	+5.0
Turnout		37,126	58.9	+2.8
Labour hold		Swing	+2.5	

=== Elections in the 2000s ===
General election 2005: Dundee West (new boundaries)
Party	Candidate	Votes	%	±%
Labour	Jim McGovern	16,468	44.6	−5.7
SNP	Joe Fitzpatrick	11,089	30.0	+2.2
Liberal Democrats	Nykoma Garry	5,323	14.4	+5.2
Conservative	Christopher McKinlay	3,062	8.3	−0.6
Scottish Socialist	Jim McFarlane	994	2.7	−1.2
Majority		5,379	14.6	−7.9
Turnout		36,936	56.1	
Labour hold		Swing		

General election 2001: Dundee West
Party	Candidate	Votes	%	±%
Labour	Ernie Ross	14,787	50.6	−3.2
SNP	Gordon Archer	7,987	27.3	+4.1
Conservative	Ian Hail	2,656	9.1	−4.1
Liberal Democrats	Elizabeth Dick	2,620	9.0	+1.3
Scottish Socialist	Jim McFarlane	1,192	4.1	+3.0
Majority		6,800	23.3	−7.3
Turnout		29,242	54.4	−13.3
Labour hold		Swing		

=== Elections in the 1990s ===
General election 1997: Dundee West
Party	Candidate	Votes	%	±%
Labour	Ernie Ross	20,875	53.8	+4.8
SNP	John Dorward	9,016	23.2	−0.4
Conservative	Neil Powrie	5,015	13.2	−5.3
Liberal Democrats	Elizabeth Dick	2,972	7.7	+0.2
Scottish Socialist	Mary Ward	428	1.1	New
Referendum	John MacMillan	411	1.1	New
Majority		11,859	30.6	+5.2
Turnout		38,717	67.7	−2.1
Labour hold		Swing		

General election 1992: Dundee West
Party	Candidate	Votes	%	±%
Labour	Ernie Ross	20,498	49.0	−4.4
SNP	Keith Brown	9,894	23.6	+8.3
Conservative	Andrew Spearman	7,746	18.5	+0.5
Liberal Democrats	Elizabeth Dick	3,132	7.5	−5.2
Green	Elly Hood	432	1.0	New
Natural Law	Donald Arnold	159	0.4	New
Majority		10,604	25.4	−10.0
Turnout		41,861	69.8	−5.6
Labour hold		Swing		

=== Elections in the 1980s ===
General election 1987: Dundee West
Party	Candidate	Votes	%	±%
Labour	Ernie Ross	24,916	53.4	+7.9
Conservative	John Donnelly	8,390	18.0	−3.7
SNP	Alasdair Morgan	7,164	15.3	−1.8
SDP	Rosemary Lonie	5,922	12.7	−4.4
Communist	Stephen Matthewson	308	0.7	New
Majority		16,526	35.4	+13.6
Turnout		46,700	75.4	+1.0
Labour hold		Swing		

General election 1983: Dundee West
Party	Candidate	Votes	%	±%
Labour	Ernie Ross	20,288	43.5	−12.8
Conservative	David Senior	10,138	21.7	−8.9
SDP	Elizabeth Dick	7,976	17.1	New
SNP	James Lynch	7,973	17.1	+4.7
Ecology	Patrick Marks	302	0.6	New
Majority		10,150	21.8	+1.0
Turnout		46,677	74.4	−4.0
Labour hold		Swing		

=== Elections in the 1970s ===
General election 1979: Dundee West
Party	Candidate	Votes	%	±%
Labour	Ernie Ross	23,654	47.25	+6.24
SNP	Jim Fairlie	13,197	26.36	−8.75
Conservative	I. Stevenson	12,892	25.75	+7.29
Communist	Raymond Mennie	316	0.63	−0.17
Majority		10,457	20.89	+14.99
Turnout		50,059	78.41	+4.09
Labour hold		Swing		

General election October 1974: Dundee West
Party	Candidate	Votes	%	±%
Labour	Peter Doig	19,480	41.01	−2.02
SNP	Jim Fairlie	16,678	35.11	+9.98
Conservative	C.G. Findlay	8,769	18.46	−12.07
Liberal	R. Hewett	2,195	4.62	New
Communist	H. McLevy	381	0.80	−0.51
Majority		2,802	5.90	−6.60
Turnout		47,503	74.32	−6.94
Labour hold		Swing		

General election February 1974: Dundee West
Party	Candidate	Votes	%	±%
Labour	Peter Doig	22,193	43.03	−8.51
Conservative	Maureen Tomison	15,745	30.53	−7.43
SNP	Jim Fairlie	12,959	25.13	+16.42
Communist	H. McLevy	673	1.31	−0.28
Majority		6,448	12.50	−0.88
Turnout		51,570	81.26	+5.00
Labour hold		Swing		

General election 1970: Dundee West
Party	Candidate	Votes	%	±%
Labour	Peter Doig	26,271	51.54	−2.17
Conservative	J.A. Payne	19,449	38.16	+1.26
SNP	J.A. Shepherd	4,441	8.71	New
Communist	H. McLevy	809	1.59	−0.86
Majority		6,822	13.38	−3.42
Turnout		50,940	76.26	−3.64
Labour hold		Swing	-1.71	

=== Elections in the 1960s ===
General election 1966: Dundee West
Party	Candidate	Votes	%	±%
Labour	Peter Doig	26,705	53.71	+0.37
Conservative	C. A. MacNab	18,345	36.90	−7.65
Liberal	J. W. Cruddas	3,454	6.95	N/A
Communist	Dave Bowman	1,217	2.45	+0.03
Majority		8,360	16.81	+7.72
Turnout		49,721	79.90	−1.60
Labour hold		Swing		

General election 1964: Dundee West
Party	Candidate	Votes	%	±%
Labour	Peter Doig	27,090	53.3	+3.7
National Liberal	Henry Campbell Scarlett	22,473	44.2	−3.9
Communist	Dave Bowman	1,228	2.4	+0.3
Majority		4,617	9.1	+7.8
Turnout		50,791	81.5	−1.4
Labour hold		Swing		

1963 by-election: Dundee West
Party	Candidate	Votes	%	±%
Labour	Peter Doig	22,449	50.6	+1.0
National Liberal	Robert Taylor	17,494	39.4	−8.9
SNP	James C. Lees	3,285	7.4	New
Communist	Dave Bowman	1,170	2.6	+0.5
Majority		4,955	11.2	+9.9
Turnout		44,398	71.6	−11.3
Labour hold		Swing		

=== Elections in the 1950s ===
General election 1959: Dundee West
Party	Candidate	Votes	%	±%
Labour	John Strachey	25,857	49.6	−0.9
Unionist	Robert R. Taylor	25,143	48.3	+1.4
Communist	Dave Bowman	1,087	2.1	−0.5
Majority		714	1.3	−2.3
Turnout		52,087	82.9	+0.2
Labour hold		Swing		

General election 1955: Dundee West
Party	Candidate	Votes	%	±%
Labour	John Strachey	26,082	50.52	−1.08
National Liberal	Gordon HM Pirie	24,208	46.89	N/A
Communist	Dave Bowman	1,335	2.59	−0.09
Majority		1,874	3.63	−3.25
Turnout		51,625	82.70	−4.10
Labour hold		Swing		

General election 1951: Dundee West
Party	Candidate	Votes	%	±%
Labour	John Strachey	29,020	51.60	−1.90
Liberal	John Junor	25,714	45.72	+43.87
Communist	Dave Bowman	1,508	2.68	New
Majority		3,306	5.88	−2.98
Turnout		56,242	86.80	−1.28
Labour hold		Swing		

General election 1950: Dundee West
Party	Candidate	Votes	%	±%
Labour	John Strachey	28,386	53.50	
National Liberal	Henry Scrymgeour-Wedderburn	23,685	44.64	
Liberal	Colin James Canning	986	1.86	
Majority		4,701	8.86	
Turnout		53,057	88.08	
Labour win (new seat)				
