= Peter Doig (politician) =

British politician

Peter Doig MP

Member of Parliament for Dundee West
- In office 21 November 1963 – 7 April 1979
- Preceded by: John Strachey
- Succeeded by: Ernie Ross

Personal details
- Born: 27 October 1911
- Died: 31 October 1996 (aged 85)
- Party: Labour

Peter Muir Doig (27 October 1911 – 31 October 1996) was a British Labour Party politician.

Doig was educated at Blackness School, Dundee, before taking evening classes. He later became a sales supervisor. He joined the Labour Party in 1930. During the Second World War he served in the Royal Air Force. He was elected a Dundee town councillor for ten years, serving as honorary town treasurer.

Doig contested Aberdeen South in 1959. He was Member of Parliament for Dundee West from a 1963 by-election to 1979, preceding Ernie Ross. On 22 September 1963, Doig was chosen ahead of five other people to be the Labour Party candidate in the by-election. At the time he was a bakery supervisor and chairman of the Labour group on Dundee Town Council. He was also deputy chairman of the council.

In 1966 Doig was recorded as a member of the Transport and General Workers Union and the Co-operative Society. He was married with two sons.

In the 1970s Doig was one of a small number of Labour MPs who supported the restoration of capital punishment, and was reported to favour a "hard line" approach towards crime. In 1979, when chairing the Scottish Standing Committee of MPs he used his casting vote to support a Conservative proposal to give police in Scotland wider powers to search for offensive weapons.

== Sources ==
- Times Guide to the House of Commons October 1974
- Leigh Rayment's Peerage Pages

Parliament of the United Kingdom
Preceded by John Strachey	Member of Parliament for Dundee West; 1963–1979	Succeeded by Ernie Ross
