= Kynoch (surname) =

Kynoch is a surname. Notable people with the surname include:

- George Kynoch (disambiguation)
  - George Kynoch (businessman) (1834–1891), founder of IMI plc, Conservative Member of Parliament (MP) for Aston Manor
  - George Kynoch (Kincardine and Deeside MP) (born 1946), Scottish Conservative Party MP
- John Kynoch (born 1933), British sport shooter
- Sholto Kynoch, English pianist
