= St Aldhelm's Church, Lytchett Heath =

Church in Dorset, England

St Aldhelm's Church
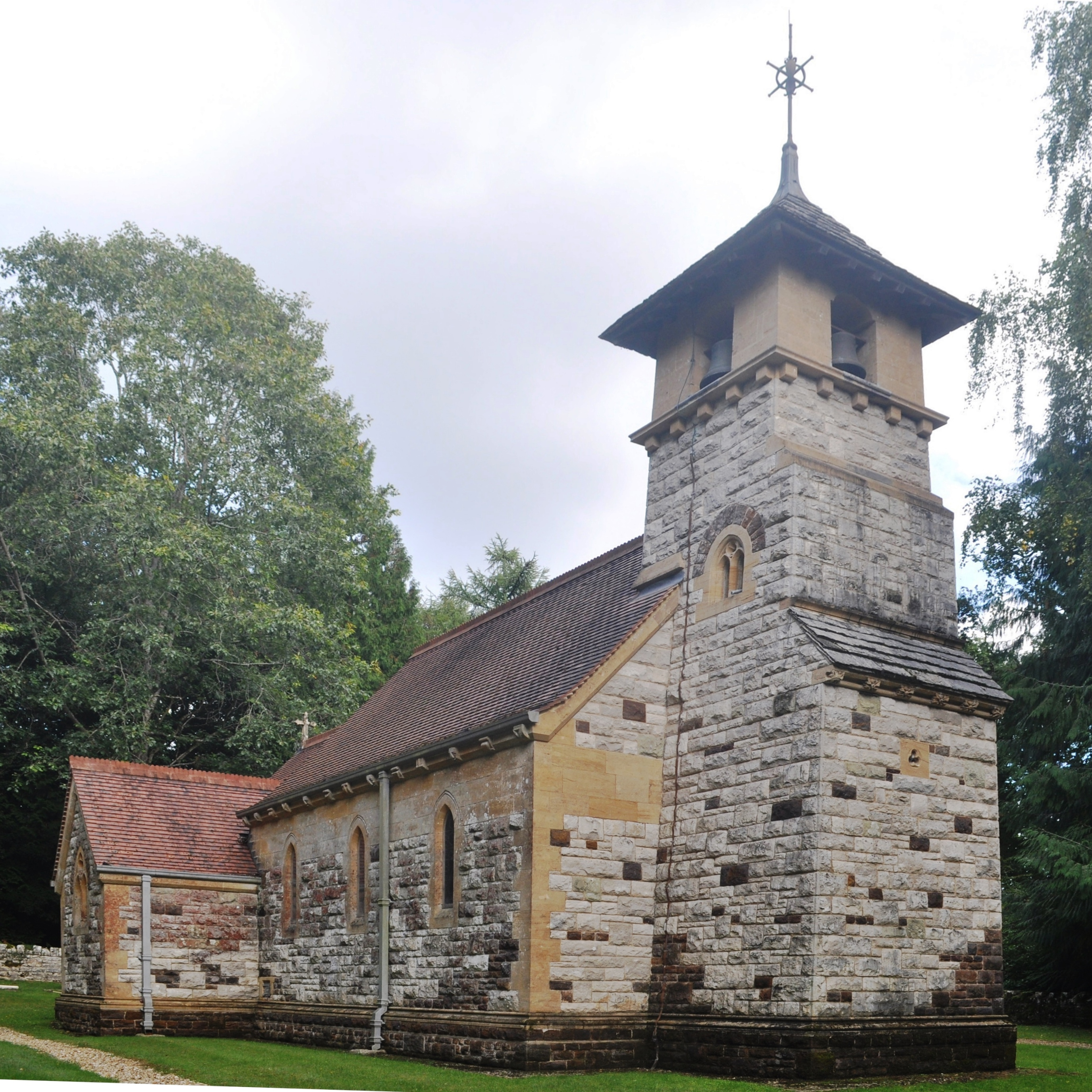
- The church in September 2025

Religion
- Affiliation: Church of England
- Ecclesiastical or organizational status: Active

Location
- Location: Lytchett Heath, Dorset, England
- Interactive map of St Aldhelm's Church
- Coordinates: 50.7502°N 2.0449°W

Architecture
- Architect: George Crickmay
- Type: Church
- Completed: 1898

St Aldhelm's Church is a private church in Lytchett Heath, Dorset, England. It was designed by George Crickmay for Lord Eustace Cecil and built in 1898. It has been a Grade II* listed building since 1984. The lychgate of the churchyard is also Grade II listed.

== History ==
St Aldhelm's was built in 1898 at the sole expense of Lord Eustace Cecil for use as a private church and to commemorate the Diamond Jubilee of Queen Victoria. It was designed by George Crickmay and dedicated by the Bishop of Salisbury, the Right Rev. John Wordsworth, on 31 May 1898. Lord Cecil first purchased a large area of land at Lytchett Heath in 1874 and built a residence, Lytchett Heath House, there in 1875.

== Architecture ==
St Aldhelm's is built of rock-faced and smooth ashlar stone in the Early English style. Designed to accommodate 60 persons, it is made up of a nave, chancel, north vestry and south porch. The west turret contains eight bells, which were added to commemorate Lord Cecil's 80th birthday in 1914. The interior uses a mixture of Purbeck, Ham and Tisbury stone. Many of the internal fittings are of oak, carved by Harry Hems of Exeter. The font is of Caen stone with a Purbeck shaft. In 2001, five stained glass windows based on Saint Aldhelm were designed and made for the church by Jude Tarrant.
