= Arthur Hope, 2nd Baron Rankeillour =

British politician, soldier and colonial administrator

The Right Honourable The Lord Rankeillour GCIE MC
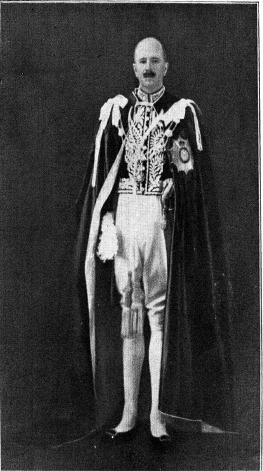
- Arthur Hope in 1940

Member of Parliament for Nuneaton
- In office 1924–1929
- Preceded by: Herbert Willison
- Succeeded by: Francis Smith
- Majority: 2,563 (6.4%)

Member of Parliament for Birmingham Aston
- In office 1931–1939
- Preceded by: John Strachey
- Succeeded by: Edward Orlando Kellett

Treasurer of the Household
- In office 1937–1939
- Preceded by: Sir Lambert Ward
- Succeeded by: Charles Waterhouse

Governor of Madras Presidency
- In office 12 March 1940 – 26 February 1946
- Governors-General: Victor Hope, 2nd Marquess of Linlithgow; The Earl Wavell
- Preceded by: John Erskine, Lord Erskine
- Succeeded by: Sir Henry Foley Knight; As Acting Governor

Personal details
- Born: 7 May 1897 Marylebone, London, England
- Died: 26 May 1958 (aged 61) Surrey, England
- Party: Conservative
- Spouse: Grizel Gilmour (m. 1919)

Arthur Oswald James Hope, 2nd Baron Rankeillour GCIE MC (7 May 1897 – 26 May 1958) was a British politician, soldier and administrator. He was a Conservative and served as Member of Parliament for Nuneaton from 1924 to 1929 and for Birmingham Aston from 1931 to 1939, after which he was Governor of the Madras Presidency of British India from 1940 to 1946.

Hope was born to James Hope, 1st Baron Rankeillour in 1897 and had his early education in England. He served with distinction in France during the First World War and entered public life soon after his military service was over.

Hope married Grizel Gilmour (daughter of Brig.-Gen. Sir Robert Wolrige Gordon, 8th of Craigmillar and 13th of Liberton, 1st Bt. and Lady Susan Lygon) in 1919 and had four daughters. He died on 26 May 1958, nineteen days after his 61st birthday.

== Early life ==
Arthur Oswald James Hope was born to James Hope, 1st Baron Rankeillour, by his marriage to Mabel Ellen Riddell, at Marylebone, England on 7 May 1897. His father had served as a Deputy Speaker of the House of Commons.

Hope was educated at The Oratory School and at Royal Military College, Sandhurst. He was commissioned into the Coldstream Guards in 1914 at the outbreak of the First World War and rose to be a Captain. He was wounded in action in France and was mentioned in dispatches. He was awarded the Military Cross and the Croix de Guerre.

== Public life ==
Hope left the army at the conclusion of the First World War and entered public life. He joined the Conservative Party and at the 1924 general election was elected to the Parliament of the United Kingdom from the Nuneaton constituency in Warwickshire. Hope served a total of fourteen years in the House of Commons, representing Nuneaton from 1924 to 1929 and Birmingham Aston from 1931 to 1940. At the 1935 election, he defeated the only other candidate (Labour's Rudolph Putnam Messel) by a margin of 10,355 votes. He was still a member of the House of Commons when appointed as Governor of Madras but gave up his seat, thereby causing a by-election in Birmingham Aston.

Hope served as the Parliamentary Private Secretary to Colonel George Lane Fox, Secretary for Mines from 1924 to 1926 and was a whip from 1935 to 1939, first as an unpaid Assistant Whip in 1935, then as an unpaid Lord of the Treasury from 1935 to 1937, as Vice-Chamberlain of the Household from May 1937 to October 1937 and finally as Treasurer of the Household from 1937 to 1939.

He was a cricketer for a time and played a first-class match for the British Army against Cambridge University at Fenner's Ground on 7 June 1926.

== As Governor of Madras ==
Hope was appointed Governor of Madras in 1940 and succeeded John Erskine, Lord Erskine on 12 March 1940.

Hope served as the Governor throughout the Second World War. Following the Japanese conquest of Burma and the Andaman and Nicobar Islands, there were strong apprehensions about possible Japanese attacks on coastal Indian cities. On 18 April 1942, in a secret communication to Victor Hope, 2nd Marquess of Linlithgow, the Viceroy of India, Hope described reports of a Japanese force heading towards India. There were Japanese air raids on the coastal towns of Vizagapatam and Cocanada on 6 April 1942 followed by sea attacks on Madras port. Hope responded by evacuating commercial and administrative establishments and business offices along the Madras coast and moving them inland.

Madras was in a state of emergency when Hope assumed his post, as the last elected government had resigned in October 1939. An anti-British campaign, the Quit India Movement, was launched in 1942. The provincial governments responded with a crackdown. Hope imposed censorship of newspapers in the Presidency and reporting on internal politics was suppressed. In protest against the government's actions, newspapers all over India were suspended for a day. Hope responded by withdrawing special privileges accorded to striking newspapers.

Due to economic reasons, the different battalions of the Madras Regiment had been disbanded in stages. With the transferring of the 1st Battalion in 1928, the Madras Regiment ceased to exist. When Hope became governor in 1940, he tried to revive the Madras Regiment and canvassed for the same.

I have always felt reading the history of the Madras army in the old days that there must be something fundamentally wrong in ignoring the Madrasis in recent years. When you read the history of the past from 1750 onwards, you will see that the Madras troops did a great part of the fighting in India in those days and were nearly always successful. It only required a good lever and a good office to bring a Madrasi back to his proper place and, therefore, almost from the first week that I was in the country, I have impressed on the late Commander-in-chief and his successor the fact that Madrasis were as good as, if not better, than anybody else and they have fought, are fighting and would fight again, as well as any other people in India, or indeed in the whole world.

Due to the efforts of Hope, the Madras Regiment was revived in 1942 and Hope was appointed the regiment's first Colonel-in-chief. A training centre was raised at Madukkarai in Coimbatore district in July 1942 and the regiment fought with distinction in the Burma campaign.

In 1945, Hope inaugurated a polytechnic college built by G. D. Naidu in Coimbatore which was later named "Arthur Hope Polytechnic" in his honour. The polytechnic was later upgraded to a college of science and technology and renamed Government College of Science and Technology in 1950. Though the college was renamed and moved to a new campus, the area where it was originally located is still called "Hope College".

== Embezzlement and forced resignation ==
Hope's tenure came to an end on 26 February 1946. Papers preserved at The National Archives indicate Lord Wavell (by then Viceroy) and the British government feared scandal after it became known to officials that Hope was receiving loans from wealthy Indians to pay off large debts incurred "speculating on the racecourse" before his appointment. Hope eventually admitted that this assumption was accurate. It was feared by Lord Wavell that Hope might be sued if he was merely removed from office; governors had protection from litigation while they remained in office. It was decided that Hope must be quickly removed as governor without raising suspicion.

Hope was diagnosed as suffering from Tropical Neurasthenia, a pseudo-medical health condition used at the time for the cover of Europeans returning home.

Hope was succeeded by Henry Foley Knight in early March 1946 who served as the Acting Governor till the arrival of Hope's designated successor Archibald Edward Nye. Nye told his superiors in September 1946, that he discovered Hope had misappropriated 50,000 rupees (£3,750) given to him the previous year and intended for the Red Cross in India (equivalent to £133,923 in 2023).

Other money given to Hope was found to have been misappropriated in the same way; no proper auditing of what was termed a "special pod account" had taken place. The prime minister of the day, Clement Attlee, consented in April 1947 for Hope's debts to paid off from British government funds. An account based in India was used to prevent any indication to the local population London had become involved in the issue. Hope is thought to have misappropriated about £40,000 (equivalent to £1,386,190 in 2023) to settle his debts.

His obituary in The Times, published in 1958, maintained the official account given a decade earlier: "He was compelled by ill-health to resign . . . before his extended term of office was complete."

== Honours ==
Hope was appointed to the Order of the Indian Empire as a Knight Grand Commander in 1939 just before his appointment as Governor of Madras. Arthur Hope succeeded to the barony on the death of his father, the 1st Baron on 14 February 1949.

== Death ==
Hope died on 26 May 1958 at the age of 61.

== Family ==
On 2 June 1919, at the age of 22, Hope married Grizel Gilmour. The couple had four daughters.

On Hope's death in 1958, as he had no son, his title and Scottish estate (Achaderry House, Roy Bridge, Inverness-shire) were inherited by his younger brother, Henry John Hope, a barrister.

== Notes ==
Parliament of the United Kingdom
Preceded by Herbert Willison	Member of Parliament for Nuneaton; 1924–1929	Succeeded by Francis Smith
Preceded by John Strachey	Member of Parliament for Birmingham Aston; 1931–1939	Succeeded by Edward Orlando Kellett
Political offices
Preceded by George Davies	Vice-Chamberlain of the Household; 1937	Succeeded by Ronald Cross
Preceded by Sir Lambert Ward	Treasurer of the Household; 1937–1939	Succeeded by Charles Waterhouse
Peerage of the United Kingdom
Preceded by James Fitzalan Hope	Baron Rankeillour; 1949–1958	Succeeded by Henry John Hope
