= 1891 Aston Manor by-election =

UK parliamentary by-election

The 1891 Aston Manor by-election was a parliamentary by-election held for the United Kingdom House of Commons constituency of Aston Manor on 20 March 1891. It was triggered by the death of incumbent MP George Kynoch. The Seat was retained by the Conservative Party.

== Result ==
1891 Aston Manor by-election
Party	Candidate	Votes	%	±%
Conservative	George Grice-Hutchinson	5,310	69.5	+13.2
Liberal	William Beale	2,332	30.5	−13.2
Majority		2,978	39.0	+26.4
Turnout		7,642	76.8	+4.4
Registered electors		9,950		
Conservative hold		Swing	+13.2	
