= Ernie Ross =

British politician (1942–2021)

- Ross as an MP

Member of Parliament for Dundee West
- In office 3 May 1979 – 11 April 2005
- Preceded by: Peter Doig
- Succeeded by: Jim McGovern

Personal details
- Born: Ernest Ross; 27 July 1942 Dundee, Scotland
- Died: 17 October 2021 (aged 79) Dundee, Scotland
- Party: Labour
- Spouse: Jane Moad (m. 1964)
- Children: 3

Ernest Ross (27 July 1942 – 17 October 2021) was a British politician who served as Member of Parliament (MP) for Dundee West from 1979 to 2005. He was a member of the Labour Party.

== Early life ==
Ross was born in Dundee, Scotland, on 27 July 1942. Both his parents were employed by National Cash Register. He completed his primary education at St Joseph's and St Mary's primary schools before attending St John's Roman Catholic High School. After graduating, he first worked as an engineer in a shipyard, then as a senior quality control engineer at Timex. He joined the Labour Party in 1973.

== Political career ==
Ross was elected Member of Parliament (MP) for Dundee West in the 1979 general election, succeeding Peter Doig. He supported Tony Benn in the 1981 Labour Party deputy leadership election. Ross was re-elected five times until his retirement at the 2005 general election, when he was succeeded by Jim McGovern.

Ross sat on the Foreign Affairs Select Committee from July 1997 to March 1999, the Standards and Privileges Committee from October 1996 to March 1997, and the Education & Employment Committee from November 1995 to March 1997. He also served on the Court of Referees from June 1987 to May 2005. While serving on the foreign affairs committee in 1999, he leaked a draft report to foreign secretary Robin Cook concerning the Sandline affair and Sierra Leone. Cook then erroneously mentioned the findings in interviews ahead of the publication of the report. This led to Ross's resignation from the committee and suspension from the House of Commons for ten days. He was consequently dubbed "the plumber", in reference to his ability to "fix leaks".

Ross was an ardent supporter of Palestinian nationalism, leading to him being nicknamed "the MP for Nablus West". He backed the decision by Dundee City Council in 1980 to twin the city with Nablus. In April of the following year, he took part in a good-will delegation from Dundee to visit Nablus and Kuwait City.

== Personal life ==
Ross married Jane Moad in 1964. They remained married until his death. Together, they had three children: Stephen, Ali and Karen. He had cancer while serving his first term in Parliament but survived after undergoing keyhole surgery by Alfred Cuschieri.

Ross died on 17 October 2021 in Dundee. He was 79 years old.

== General sources ==
- Leigh Rayment's Historical List of MPs

Parliament of the United Kingdom
Preceded by Peter Doig	Member of Parliament for Dundee West; 1979–2005	Succeeded by Jim McGovern
