= Jim McGovern (British politician) =

British politician (born 1956)

James McGovern
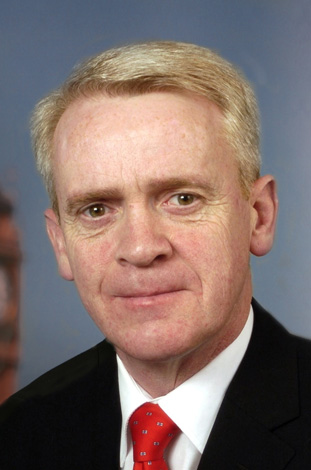

Member of Parliament for Dundee West
- In office 5 May 2005 – 30 March 2015
- Preceded by: Ernie Ross
- Succeeded by: Chris Law

Personal details
- Born: 17 November 1956 (age 69) Glasgow, Lanarkshire, Scotland
- Party: Labour
- Spouse: Norma McGovern

James McGovern (born 17 November 1956) is a Scottish Labour politician who was the Member of Parliament (MP) for Dundee West from 2005 to 2015.

== Early life ==
McGovern was born in Glasgow, but moved to Dundee at the age of 9. He was educated at the Catholic Lawside Academy. He left school at the age of 15 and at the age of 16 began an apprenticeship as a glazier. In 1987, after being made redundant, he worked as a glazier for Dundee City Council. Whilst working for the council he was active within the GMB union. In 1997 he began working full-time for the union as Trade Union Organiser.

== Parliamentary career ==
He was first elected to the British House of Commons at the 2005 general election for Dundee West with a 14.6% majority, following the retirement of the sitting Labour MP Ernie Ross. Since 2005, he has served on the Scottish Affairs Committee. Between 2007 and 2008, he served as the Parliamentary Private Secretary to Pat McFadden, the Minister of State at the Department for Business, Enterprise and Regulatory Reform, before resigning over the row surrounding the privatisation of Royal Mail. He was re-elected in 2010 with a majority of 19.6%.

McGovern lost his appeal against the Independent Parliamentary Standards Authority's rejection of a £23.90 single rail ticket from Dundee to Glasgow in April 2013. The Sunday Herald reported that Parliamentary authorities determined that the detour was unconnected to McGovern's official work as an MP. He had been attending a Labour Party event in Glasgow. IPSA revealed that its bill for defending against McGovern's appeal was £27,000, to be met by the taxpayers.

In February 2013, McGovern voted against the Marriage (Same Sex Couples) Act 2013, opposing the legalisation of same-sex marriage within England and Wales. The MP subsequently declined to vote during the bill's third and final reading.

On 3 April 2015, McGovern announced he would not stand at the 2015 general election, citing ill health.

== Personal life ==
He is married to Norma with two children and lives in the Law part of Dundee.

Parliament of the United Kingdom
Preceded by Ernie Ross	Member of Parliament for Dundee West; 2005–2015	Succeeded by Chris Law
