= Hugh Reid (politician) =

Scottish journalist and politician

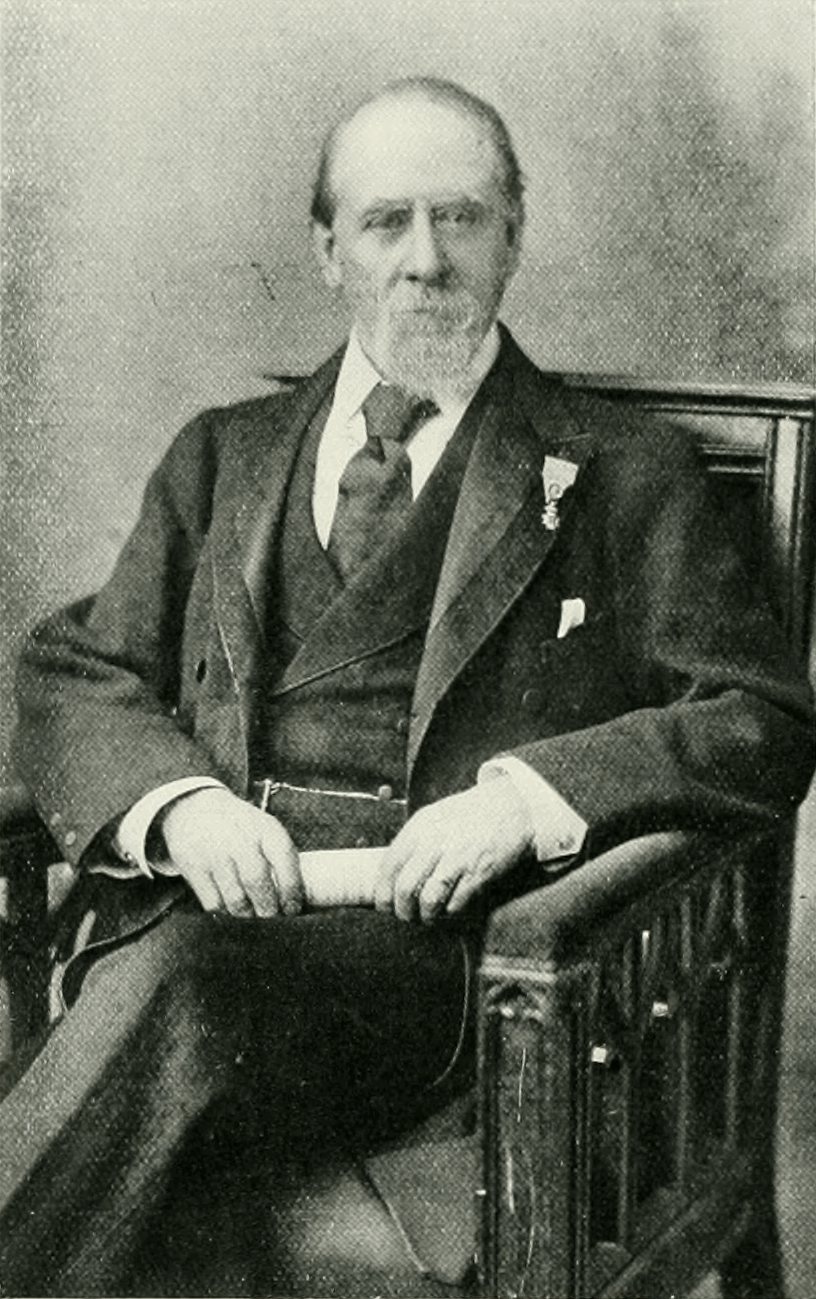
This photo of Hugh Gilzean-Reid appeared in Page's Magazine, August 1902.

Sir Hugh Gilzean Reid (11 August 1836 – 5 November 1911) was a Scottish journalist and Liberal politician who sat in the House of Commons from 1885 to 1886.

Reid was the son of the Hugh Reid and his wife Christian Gilzean who was descended from a long line of Highland crofters. He was primarily self-educated and later studied for the non-conformist ministry, and passed examinations in classics and theology.

Reid was editor of the Edinburgh Weekly News. In the early 1860s, he founded the Middlesbrough Daily Gazette, the first halfpenny evening newspaper in the United Kingdom.

In the 1885 general election, Reid was elected as Member of Parliament for the English constituency of Aston Manor as a Liberal. His wife, Anne Gilzean Reid, was a founder member and president of the Women's Liberal Association.

Gilzean-Reid resided much in Belgium, and took early part in promoting civilising and religious agencies in the Congo. For his services, he was appointed and Officer of the Order of Leopold in 1897 and a Commander of the Order of the Crown in 1899.

In 1897, Reid leased Dollis Hill House in North London, where he invited the writer Mark Twain to stay as a guest in 1900. He died in Hendon aged 75.

== Honours ==
He was knighted in 1893.

Parliament of the United Kingdom
New constituency	Member of Parliament for Aston Manor; 1885 – 1886	Succeeded by George Kynoch
