= IMI plc =

British engineering company

- Formerly: Imperial Metal Industries Limited (1962–1978); IMI Limited (1978–1981)
- Type: Public
- Traded as: LSE: IMI; FTSE 100 component
- ISIN: GB00BGLP8L22
- Industry: Engineering
- Founded: 1862
- Headquarters: Birmingham, England, UK
- Key people: Jamie Pike (Chairman); Roy Twite (CEO); Luke Grant (CFO)
- Revenue: ▲£2,304.0 million (2025)
- Operating income: ▲£460.1 million (2025)
- Net income: ▲£309.9 million (2025)
- Number of employees: 10,000 (2026)
- Website: imiplc.com

IMI plc (LSE: IMI), formerly Imperial Metal Industries Limited (1962–1968) and IMI Limited (1978–1981), is a British-based engineering company headquartered in Birmingham, England. It is listed on the London Stock Exchange and is a constituent of the FTSE 100 Index.

== History ==
The company was founded by Scottish entrepreneur George Kynoch who opened a percussion cap factory in Witton, West Midlands in 1862, trading as Kynoch. The business soon diversified, manufacturing goods ranging from soap and bicycle components to non-ferrous metals, but by the early 20th century it had developed particular expertise in metallurgy. After World War I it merged with Nobel Industries. In 1926 the company acquired Eley Brothers, an ammunition business. The company, by then known as Nobel Explosives, was one of the four businesses that merged in 1927 to create Imperial Chemical Industries. The Witton site became the head office of ICI Metals. During the Second World War the Witton site was used for the development and production of uranium for the Tube Alloys project.

In the 1950s the company's researchers perfected the process for producing titanium on a commercial basis. In 1958 ICI Metals bought 50% of Yorkshire Imperial Metals: it acquired the other 50% four years later.

The name Imperial Metal Industries Limited (IMI for short) was adopted on the 100th anniversary of the firm in 1962. The company was listed on the London Stock Exchange in 1966. Initially ICI retained a majority holding, but in 1978 IMI became fully independent. In the 1990s the Company disposed of its more basic businesses such as metal smelting and metal founding.

In 2003, IMI moved from the Witton site to new headquarters close to Birmingham Airport.

The company announced in October 2013 that a decade-long programme of transformation had been completed with the disposal of two non-core subsidiaries to Berkshire Hathaway for £690m. The disposal of the Cornelius Group, a beverage-dispensing machine business, together with the disposal of a marketing intelligence business, would enable the company to focus on its control valve making business.

In November 2022, it was announced IMI had acquired the Blackburn-based smart thermostatic control manufacturer, Heatmiser, for £110 million.

== Sectors ==
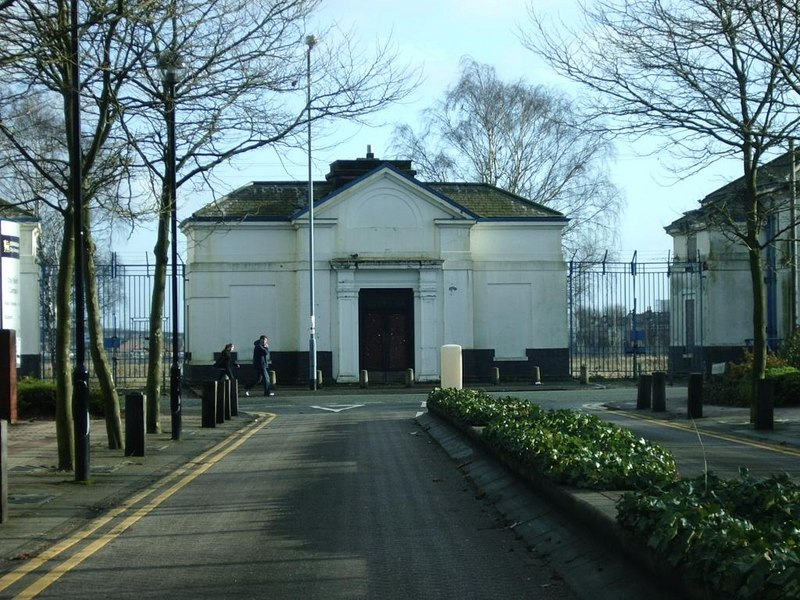
Former IMI entrance at Perry Barr

The company is involved in five sectors:

- Process automation
- Industrial automation
- Climate control
- Life science & fluid control
- Transport
