= John Strachey (politician) =

British politician and writer

The Right Honourable John Strachey MP
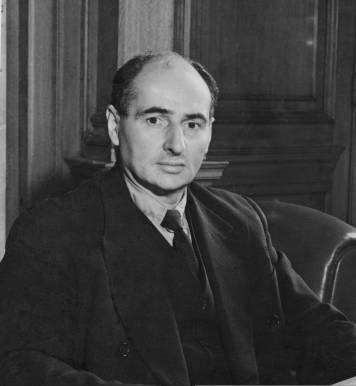

Secretary of State for War
- In office 28 February 1950 – 26 October 1951
- Monarch: George VI
- Prime Minister: Clement Attlee
- Preceded by: Manny Shinwell
- Succeeded by: Antony Head

Minister of Food
- In office 27 May 1946 – 28 February 1950
- Preceded by: Sir Ben Smith
- Succeeded by: Maurice Webb

Personal details
- Born: 21 October 1901 Guildford, Surrey, UK
- Died: 15 July 1963 (aged 61) Marylebone, London, UK
- Party: Labour
- Other political affiliations: Communist Party of Great Britain (until 1940); Popular Front; New Party (1931)
- Education: Magdalen College, Oxford

Evelyn John St Loe Strachey (21 October 1901 – 15 July 1963) was a British Labour politician and writer.

A journalist by profession, Strachey was elected to Parliament in 1929. He was initially a disciple of Oswald Mosley, and, feeling that the Second Labour Government was not doing enough to combat unemployment, joined Mosley in founding the New Party in 1931. He broke with Mosley later in the year and so did not follow him into fascism. Strachey lost his seat in 1931, was a Communist sympathiser for the rest of the 1930s and broke with the Communist Party in 1940.

During the Second World War, Strachey served as a Royal Air Force officer in planning and public relations roles. He was once again elected to Parliament as a Labour MP in 1945 and held office under Clement Attlee as Minister of Food (he became an unpopular figure because of the continued food rationing) and as Secretary of State for War. He continued to be a Labour MP, generally as a supporter of the party's right wing until his death.

Throughout his career, Strachey was a prolific writer of books and articles from a communist perspective in the 1930s and as a social democrat after the Second World War.

== Early and education ==
Strachey was born in Guildford, Surrey, on 21 October 1901, the youngest of three sons of John St Loe Strachey (1860–1927), editor of The Spectator.

He was educated at Eton College (1915–19). He went up to Magdalen College, Oxford, in 1920. At Oxford he was editor, with his close friend Robert Boothby, of the Tory-leaning Oxford Fortnightly Review. Strachey's Oxford career was interrupted by ill-health – peritonitis – and he left after two years in 1922 without taking a degree.

He joined the staff of The Spectator in 1922.

== Political career ==
=== Disciple of Oswald Mosley ===
In 1923 Strachey began writing for the Independent Labour Party (ILP) publication New Leader.

He joined the Labour Party in 1923 and in 1924 he was the unsuccessful Labour candidate for Birmingham Aston. He became a close ally of Oswald Mosley, then an up-and-coming Labour politician who had contested Birmingham Ladywood.

In 1925 Mosley and Strachey published the "Birmingham Proposals", calling for better policies to deal with unemployment. In 1925 Strachey published Revolution by Reason, calling for money-printing, redistribution and state planning. In 1926, during the General Strike, he became editor of the ILP's Socialist Review and of The Miner. He was sympathetic to Marxist analysis, but disliked class warfare. In 1928 he visited the USSR. On 24 April 1929 he married Esther Murphy (c. 1899–1962), the daughter of a New York department store owner. Mosley was his best man.

At the 1929 general election he became the MP for Birmingham Aston and Mosley's Parliamentary private secretary. In May 1930 Mosley and Strachey resigned over the government's unemployment policies. In 1930 he visited the USSR for a second time. In February 1931 Strachey supported Mosley in founding the New Party, but he resigned in July 1931 when Mosley rejected socialism and close links with the USSR. Mosley subsequently turned to fascism.

By this time Strachey's marriage had failed, and he renewed an old relationship with Celia Simpson (1900–79), the daughter of a clergyman. She had been sacked from The Spectator for being too left-wing, having joined the Communist Party of Great Britain (CPGB). In the October 1931 election, Strachey defended his seat at Aston as an independent pro-communist workers' candidate, but was defeated. He applied to join the CPGB himself but was rejected in the summer of 1932 as an unreliable intellectual. He suffered a nervous breakdown and underwent three years of psychoanalysis. After obtaining a divorce from his first wife he married Celia on 13 October 1933. They had a son, Charles, in 1934 and a daughter Elizabeth in 1936.

=== Communist ===
Mosley's British Union of Fascists (BUF) organised a large rally at the Olympia Hall in London in June 1934. A counter-demonstration was organised, and the rally turned into a violent disturbance in which many were injured. A Committee for Coordinating Anti-Fascist Activities was formed, with Strachey as secretary, sponsored by the World Committee Against War and Fascism (Amsterdam-Pleyel). When the BUF staged another demonstration of 3,000 Fascists in Hyde Park, London, on 9 September 1934, Strachey's committee organised a major counter-demonstration by 20,000 anti-Fascists.

Strachey assisted the publisher Victor Gollancz and Harold Laski in founding the Left Book Club in 1936. As the author of The Coming Struggle for Power (1932), and a series of other significant works, Strachey was one of the most prolific and widely read British Marxist–Leninist theorists of the 1930s. He wrote what the Oxford Dictionary of National Biography (ODNB) calls "the most influential popularisations of Marxism that were ever published in English". He criticised the economics of John Maynard Keynes from a Marxist perspective before himself becoming a Keynesian. He often wrote for the monthly bulletin Left News.

Strachey helped launch the Popular Front in December 1936.

=== Second World War ===
By 1938 Strachey was persuaded by Keynesianism and the New Deal of American president Franklin D. Roosevelt. In 1940 he published "A Programme for Progress". Strachey became increasingly unhappy with the Communist movement following the Molotov–Ribbentrop Pact and the Soviet Invasion of Finland. In a letter to the New Statesman Strachey claimed the Communists "are prepared, for the sake of the ... Soviet Union, to give way to Hitler to any extent, and they are utterly irresponsible as to the consequences to the British people of such unlimited giving way. So long as that remains the case I ... can have nothing to do with them." He broke with the CPGB in April 1940.

Early in the war Strachey served as a volunteer air raid warden. Towards the end of 1940 he joined the Royal Air Force in which he served as a squadron leader with a temporary commission. He served first as an adjutant with No. 87 Squadron RAF, a Hawker Hurricane fighter squadron, then as the PR officer with a bomber group. He was posted to the Air Ministry as a public relations officer in the Directorate of Bombing Operations and made a reputation as an air commentator for the BBC, making official broadcasts about the men of RAF Bomber Command.

=== Attlee Government and after ===
Returning to the Labour Party, he was chosen to be the Labour candidate for Dundee early in 1943.

He was re-elected to Parliament in 1945 initially representing Dundee. He was immediately appointed Under-Secretary of State for Air and is widely credited as having been responsible for ignoring Air Chief Marshal Sir Arthur Harris and, by implication, Bomber Command from the Victory Honours List. This may have been retaliation for Harris' request to have Strachey removed from his wartime post within the Directorate of Bombing Operations due to Strachey's changeable political persuasions, a request that was not successful as Strachey remained in the post until the end of the war.

During the Palestine Emergency, Strachey's support for Zionism went as far as collaborating against the British Mandate government. One such attack in which he was implicated was the Night of the Bridges. Although no British soldiers were killed in the initial attacks, 20-year-old Royal Engineer Roy Charles Allen was killed while trying to defuse an undetonated bomb. Hugh Thomas claims in his biography of Strachey that:

"One day, Crossman, now in the House of Commons, came to see Strachey. The former was devoting his efforts to the Zionist cause. He had heard from his friends in the Jewish Agency that they were contemplating an act of sabotage, not only for its own purpose but to demonstrate to the world their capacities. Should this be done, or should it not? Few would be killed. But would it help the Jews? Crossman asked Strachey his advice, and Strachey, a member of the Defence Committee of the Cabinet, undertook to find out. The next day in the smoking room of the House of Commons, Strachey gave his approval to Crossman. The Haganah went ahead and blew up all the bridges over the Jordan. "

He was appointed Minister of Food in May 1946 and became a Privy Counsellor that same year. His appointment owed much to his reputation as a confidently facile speaker and for being ultra-efficient. However, his time in office was beset with problems about food rationing. His obituary in The Glasgow Herald noted he had introduced bread rationing almost as soon as he took up his new office and that although he defended the policy as being "forced on him by world shortage", this was deeply unpopular; from then on he and his junior minister Dr Edith Summerskill were faced with "constant criticism which would have tried spirits more patient than those of Strachey". Another issue which he was a proponent of was the Tanganyika groundnut scheme. The same obituarist opined that Strachey's defence of the "ill-fated groundnuts scheme" was "more notable for loyalty than discretion".

On the division of the Dundee constituency, he was elected as Labour MP for Dundee West in February 1950, holding the seat until his death in 1963. He succeeded Manny Shinwell as Secretary of State for War (1950–51). This was not a Cabinet post at the time. His Glasgow Herald obituary commented that the move to the War Office "was, therefore, no surprise" after his unpopularity at the Food Ministry. Strachey was subjected to press attack after the Klaus Fuchs Affair (March 1950) as he was known to have been a communist sympathiser. He then denounced the Schuman Plan, which did not help his reputation. He had doubts about the Korean War but unlike Aneurin Bevan did not resign in April 1951.

During the Labour Party's civil war of the early 1950s Strachey tried to be an "insider", neither Bevanite nor Gaitskellite. He supported Hugh Gaitskell as successor to Clement Attlee as Labour Party leader in the 1955 leadership election. In the 1950s Strachey devoted much of his time to writing studies of British society from a social democratic viewpoint. Strachey was an opponent of the Campaign for Nuclear Disarmament. In 1963 he supported George Brown for the party leadership; the victorious candidate, Harold Wilson, appointed him Shadow Secretary of State for Commonwealth Affairs.

== Death ==
Strachey died in Marylebone, London, on 15 July 1963, after a spinal operation, aged 61.

His wealth at death was £50,157 and 1s (equivalent to £916,122 in 2025).

== Publications ==
- Revolution by Reason (1925)
- Workers' Control in the Russian Mining Industry, (1928)
- The Coming Struggle for Power (1932) – in which he advocated reason, science and culture
- Unstable Money, John Day (1933)
- The Menace of Fascism (1933) – calling for militant resistance and arguing that fascism was based on the defence of private property
- The Nature of Capitalist Crisis (1935)
- The Theory and Practice of Socialism (1936) – described by ODNB as "the most important book ever published by the Left Book Club"
- What Are We to Do? (1938)
- Why You Should be a Socialist (1938) – which sold 200,000 copies within two months of publication
- A Programme for Progress (1940)
- Digging for Mrs. Miller: Some Experiences of an Air-Raid Warden in London (1941)
- A Faith to Fight For (1941)
- Post D (1941/1942)
- Labour's task (1951)
- Contemporary Capitalism (1956) – a blend of Keynesian and Marxist analysis, in which he argued that there was an inherent conflict between capitalism and democracy
- The End of Empire (1959)
- The pursuit of peace (1960)
- On the Prevention of War (1962) – advocating deterrence theory rather than unilateral disarmament
- The Strangled Cry (1962) – a critique of communism
- "The Challenge of Democracy" (1963)

== See also ==
- Strachey baronets

== Sources ==
- International Who's Who, 1945–1946 ("Strachey, Evelyn John St. Loe, M.P.")
- Ceplair, Larry (1987). Under the Shadow of War: Fascism, Anti-Fascism, and Marxists, 1918–1939. Columbia University Press. ISBN 978-0-231-06532-0.
- Falconer, Jonathon (1998). The Bomber Command Handbook 1939–1945. Stroud: Sutton Publishing Limited. ISBN 0-7509-1819-5.
- Macintyre, Stuart (1972), John Strachey, 1901–1931: The development of an English Marxist, MA thesis, Monash University
- Markwell, Donald (2006). John Maynard Keynes and International Relations: Economic Paths to War and Peace. Oxford University Press.
- Matthew, Colin, ed. (2004). Dictionary of National Biography. Vol. 52. Oxford: Oxford University Press. ISBN 978-0198614111., essay on Strachey written by Michael Newman

Parliament of the United Kingdom
Preceded by Evelyn Cecil	Member of Parliament for Aston; 1929–1931	Succeeded by Arthur Hope
Preceded by Florence Horsbrugh; Dingle Foot	Member of Parliament for Dundee; 1945–1950; With: Thomas Cook	Constituency abolished
New constituency	Member of Parliament for Dundee West; 1950–1963	Succeeded by Peter Doig
Political offices
Preceded by Hon. Quintin Hogg; The Earl Beatty	Under-Secretary of State for Air; 1945–1946	Succeeded by Geoffrey de Freitas
Preceded by Ben Smith	Minister of Food; 1946–1950	Succeeded by Maurice Webb
Preceded by Manny Shinwell	Secretary of State for War; 1950–1951	Succeeded by Antony Head
