= Eric Anderson (VC) =

Recipient of the Victoria Cross

- Born: 15 September 1915; Bradford, West Yorkshire, England
- Died: 6 April 1943 (aged 27); Wadi Akarit, French Tunisia
- Burial place: Sfax War Cemetery, Tunisia
- Military career
- Allegiance: United Kingdom
- Branch: British Army
- Service years: 1940–1943
- Rank: Private
- Service number: 4347754
- Units: East Yorkshire Regiment
- Conflicts: Second World War: North African campaign; Tunisian campaign; Battle of Wadi Akarit (DOW)
- Awards: Victoria Cross

Private Eric Anderson (15 September 1915 – 6 April 1943) was a British Army soldier and an English recipient of the Victoria Cross (VC), the highest and most prestigious award for gallantry in the face of the enemy that can be awarded to British and Commonwealth forces.

== Early life ==
He was born in Fagley in Bradford, West Yorkshire, the only son of George and Mary Anderson. He became a driver for a building and contracting firm in Idle, West Yorkshire.

== Service ==
Anderson was 27 years old, and a Private in the 5th Battalion, East Yorkshire Regiment, British Army during the Second World War when the following deed took place for which he was awarded the VC.

On 6 April 1943 on the Wadi Akarit, Tunisia, when a company of the East Yorkshire Regiment had to withdraw temporarily behind the crest of a hill, Private Anderson, a stretcher-bearer, went forward alone through heavy fire to rescue the wounded. Three times he brought in wounded comrades, and was rendering first aid to a fourth when he was mortally wounded.

He is buried in Sfax War Cemetery in southern Tunisia. His Victoria Cross is displayed at The Prince of Wales Own Regiment of Yorkshire Museum in York.

== See also ==
- List of Second World War Victoria Cross recipients
