= Edward Kellett (Conservative politician) =

British Army officer and politician (1902–1943)

Edward Orlando Kellett DSO MP
- Born: 19 May 1902; Ireland
- Died: 22 March 1943 (aged 40); Tunisia
- Burial place: Sfax War Cemetery, Tunisia
- Military career
- Allegiance: United Kingdom
- Branch: British Army
- Rank: Colonel
- Service number: 26078
- Unit: Royal Armoured Corps
- Conflicts: World War II: North African Campaign; Tunisian campaign †
- Awards: Distinguished Service Order

Colonel Edward Orlando Kellett DSO (19 May 1902 – 22 March 1943) was an English Member of Parliament and British Army officer who was killed in action during the fighting in Tunisia during the Second World War.

The son of Major-General Richard Orlando Kellett, Kellett graduated from the Royal Military College, Sandhurst, and was commissioned as a second lieutenant into the Irish Guards on 1 February 1923. In 1928 he was confirmed as a lieutenant in the reserves. On 1 March 1930 he transferred to the Territorial Army (TA) as a lieutenant in the Sherwood Rangers Yeomanry. By 1939 he was a major and in May 1939 was elected as Member of Parliament for Birmingham Aston. He was also a big game hunter.

The Second World War saw him fighting in Tunisia as a colonel of the Royal Armoured Corps. Kellett is prominently featured in Keith Douglas' memoir 'Alamein to Zem Zem', where he is referred to under the pseudonym 'Piccadilly Jim'. Kellett was killed in action by a shell which hit his tank during the fighting in North Africa. He is buried in Section XIII, Row A, Grave 12 at Sfax War Cemetery.

Parliament of the United Kingdom
| Preceded by Arthur Hope | Member of Parliament for Birmingham Aston; 1939–1943 | Succeeded by Redvers Michael Prior |
