= William Mordaunt Marsh Edwards =

English soldier, recipient of the Victoria Cross

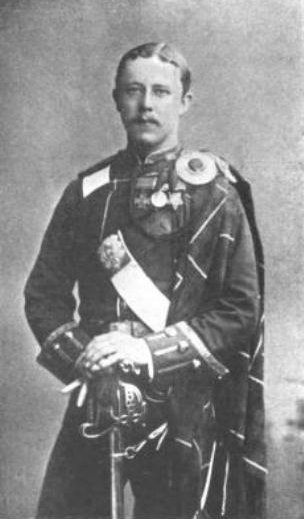
- Born: 7 May 1855; Hardingham, Norfolk, England
- Died: 17 September 1912 (aged 57); Hardingham, Norfolk, England
- Burial place: St George's Churchyard, Hardingham, Norfolk; 52°36′21″N 1°00′15″E
- Military career
- Allegiance: United Kingdom
- Branch: British Army
- Service years: 1876–1896
- Rank: Major
- Units: 74th Highlanders; Highland Light Infantry
- Conflicts: 1882 Anglo-Egyptian War
- Awards: Victoria Cross
- Other work: Honourable Corps of Gentlemen at Arms

Major William Mordaunt Marsh Edwards, VC, DL (7 May 1855 – 17 September 1912) was an English recipient of the Victoria Cross, the highest and most prestigious award for gallantry in the face of the enemy that can be awarded to British and Commonwealth forces.

== Early life ==
Edwards was the son and heir of Henry William Bartholomew, of Hardingham Hall, Norfolk. He was educated at Eton and Trinity College, Cambridge. He did not take a degree at Cambridge, but joined the Army. He was commissioned as a sub-lieutenant on the Unattached List on 22 March 1876, and in January 1877 joined the 74th (Highland) Regiment of Foot, with the rank of lieutenant.

== Victoria Cross ==
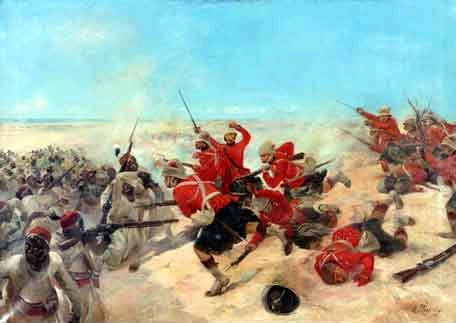
Depiction of the battle of Tel-el-Kebir

Edwards was 27 years old, and serving as a lieutenant in the 2nd Battalion, The Highland Light Infantry, during the British occupation of Egypt when the following deed took place for which he was awarded the VC.

On 13 September 1882 at Tel-el-Kebir, Egypt, Lieutenant Edwards led a party of the Highland Light Infantry to storm a redoubt. The lieutenant who was in advance of his party, rushed alone into the battery, killed the artillery officer in charge and was himself knocked down by a gunner with a rammer and was rescued only by the timely arrival of three men of his regiment. He was severely wounded.

== Later career ==
Edwards was promoted to captain on 23 March 1887. He served as adjutant of the 3rd Battalion, HLI, from 1 January 1892, until 1 November 1893, and was promoted to major on 4 September 1895. Edwards retired from the army on 11 November 1896.

On 19 February 1899, on the nomination of Lord Belper, he was appointed one of the Honourable Corps of Gentlemen-at-Arms, and on 13 August 1900 he was commissioned as a deputy lieutenant of the County of Norfolk.
