= Sfax War Cemetery =

Commonwealth War Graves Commission cemetery in Tunisia

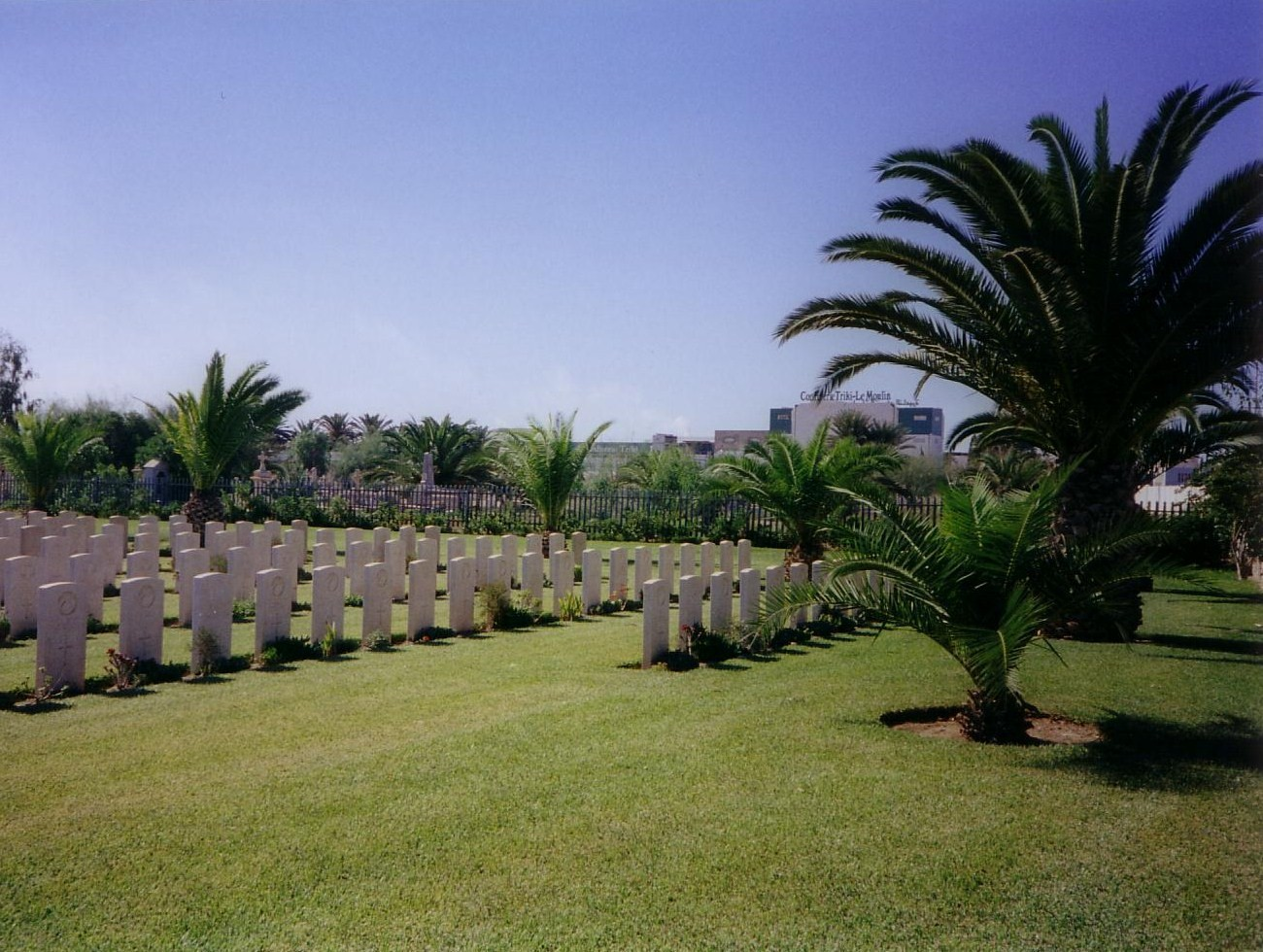
- Sfax War Cemetery

Details
- Location: Sfax
- Country: Tunisia
- Coordinates: 34.72034°N 10.73369°E
- Type: Commonwealth War Graves Commission cemetery
- No. of interments: 1,253
- Website: Official website

Sfax War Cemetery is a war cemetery located near Sfax, Tunisia, currently maintained by the Commonwealth War Graves Commission. It contains a single Commonwealth burial from World War I, 1253 Commonwealth burials from World War II (52 of them have yet to be identified), and the grave of one Greek soldier from World War II.

== Notable interments ==
- Private Eric Anderson VC
- Colonel Edward Orlando Kellett DSO
- Second Lieutenant Moana-Nui-a-Kiwa Ngarimu VC
- Company Havildar-Major Chhelu Ram VC
- Lieutenant Colonel Derek Anthony Seagrim VC
