= Kynoch =

British ammunition manufacturer

- Type: Private
- Industry: ammunition
- Founded: 1862, Witton in Birmingham, United Kingdom
- Founder: George Kynoch
- Fate: Incorporated
- Successor: ICI
- Headquarters: Mildenhall, Suffolk, United Kingdom
- Website: www.kynochammunition.co.uk

Kynoch was a manufacturer of ammunition that was later incorporated into ICI, but remained as a brand name for sporting cartridges.

== History ==
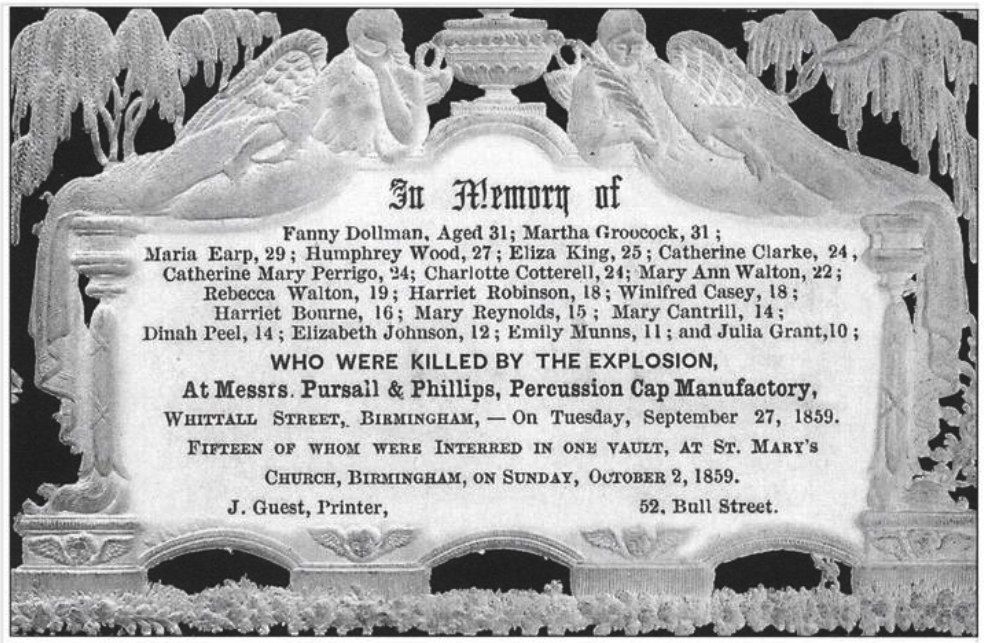
Memorial card to the nineteen victims of the explosion at Messrs Pursall and Philip's works on Whittall Street, fifteen of whom were interred together at St Mary's Church, also in Whittall Street

The firm of Pursall and Phillips operated a 'percussion cap manufactory' at Whittall Street, in Birmingham, in the mid 19th century. In 1856, Scottish entrepreneur George Kynoch joined the company. An explosion in 1859 destroyed the works, killing 19 of the 70 employees. As a result, the firm moved to Witton in 1862, on a site adjacent to the London and North Western Railway's Grand Junction line. In 1863, Kynoch took over the business, which was subsequently renamed G. Kynoch and Co. A further series of explosions in the 1860s and in 1870 led to dozens of deaths and hundreds of injuries.

In 1895 Kynoch built an explosives factory east of Shell Haven Creek, Essex (now known as Coryton). This opened in 1897, with an estate for employees called Kynochtown. Products included cordite, guncotton, gunpowder, and cartridges. After World War I many of the UK ammunition and explosives manufacturers were brought together under Nobel Explosives to become Nobel Industries, which was a founding element of Imperial Chemical Industries Ltd (ICI) in 1926. Once Nobel Industries, including Kynoch Ltd, had merged to form ICI, the original Kynoch factory in Witton became the head office and principal manufacturing base of the "ICI Metals Division". Kynoch, along with names such as Eley, became brands of subsidiaries.

Kynoch established a munitions factory on the north side of Arklow, Ireland. This factory employed several thousand workers during World War I, but closed shortly after it, all production being moved to South Africa. Seventeen workers were killed in an explosion there on 21 September 1917. It was believed that the plant was shelled by a German U-boat

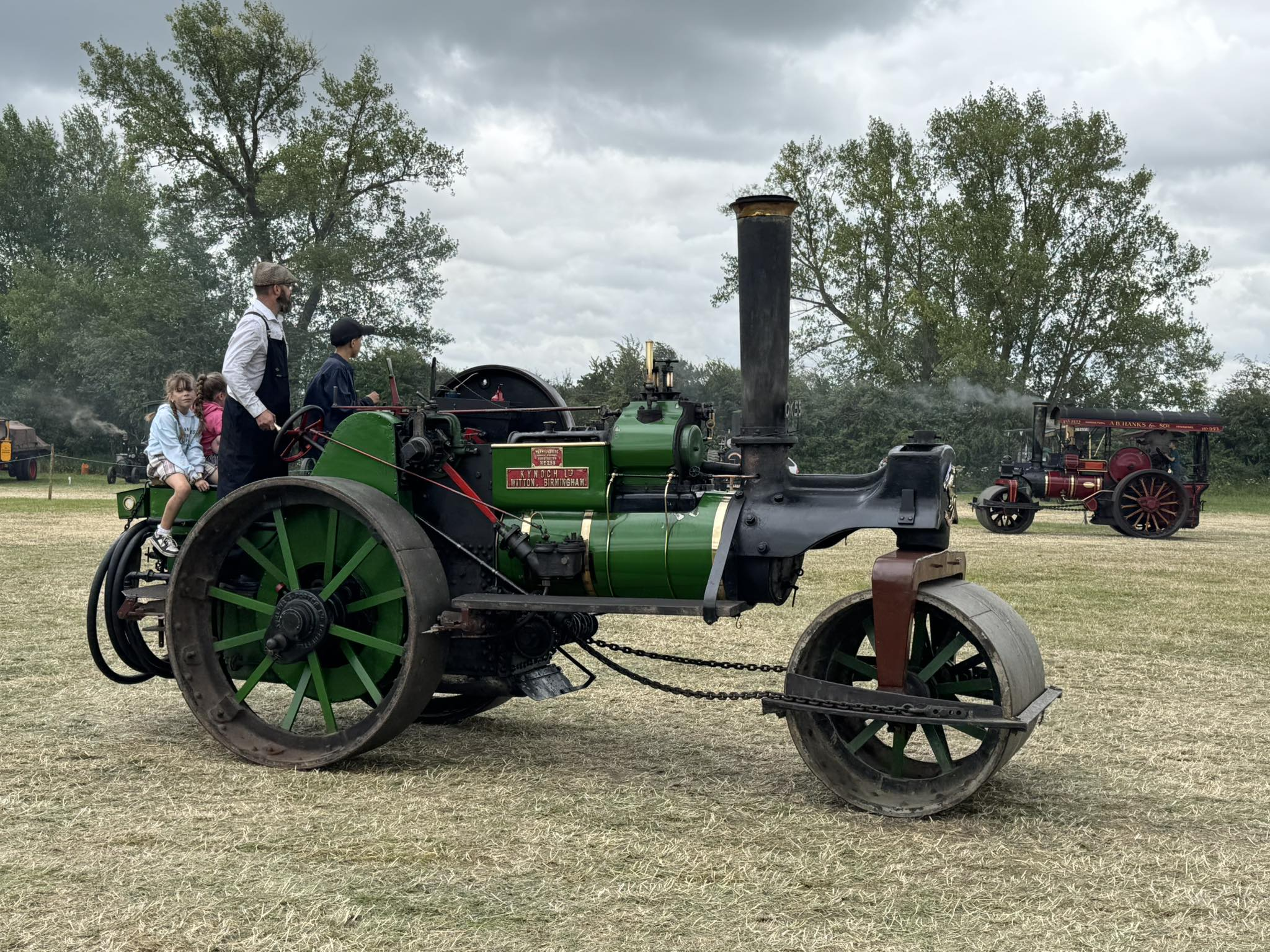
Steam roller, formerly owned by Kynoch and used at Witton until the 1960s. Seen at Appleford Steam Fair in 2025.

During the 1950s, the sound of test firing of munitions still occasionally shattered the peace over Witton, but with the standardization of cartridges across the Western powers and a general downturn in ammunition requirements, the sidelines in sporting cartridges were discontinued by Imperial Metal Industries (IMI) in 1970. IMI became independent of ICI in 1977, still producing rimfire and shotgun cartridges for the sporting markets. The more economically viable production of shotgun and rimfire ammunition continued. The Ammunition Division was incorporated separately as Eley Limited in 1983.

== Kynamco ==
In 1996, David Little working under the company name Kynamco Ltd (Kynoch Ammunition Company) took over the Kynoch brand. Initially production commenced in Royston, Hertfordshire and in 2000, moved to a purpose built facility in Mildenhall, Suffolk.

Kynamco, using the Kynoch trademark manufacture 51 of the more popular Kynoch calibres from 6.5x54 mm up to the .700 Nitro Express. They also produced various other types of ammunition for industrial, film and re-enactment use.

In July 2025, Kynamco eventually entered into liquidation.

== The Kynoch Press ==
The Kynoch Press was founded as a company press in 1876 to print packaging. To manage publicity, the company set it up as a fine press, which, when Kynoch became part of ICI in 1926, continued as a division and kept its name, The Kynoch Press. The Kynoch Press not only handled the firm's printing, but performed independent work, operating at times like a small press, and at other times like a fine press, and yet at other times like a private press.

== Gallery ==
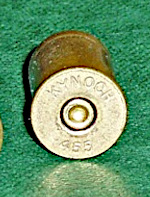
A Kynoch-produced Webley .455 cartridge

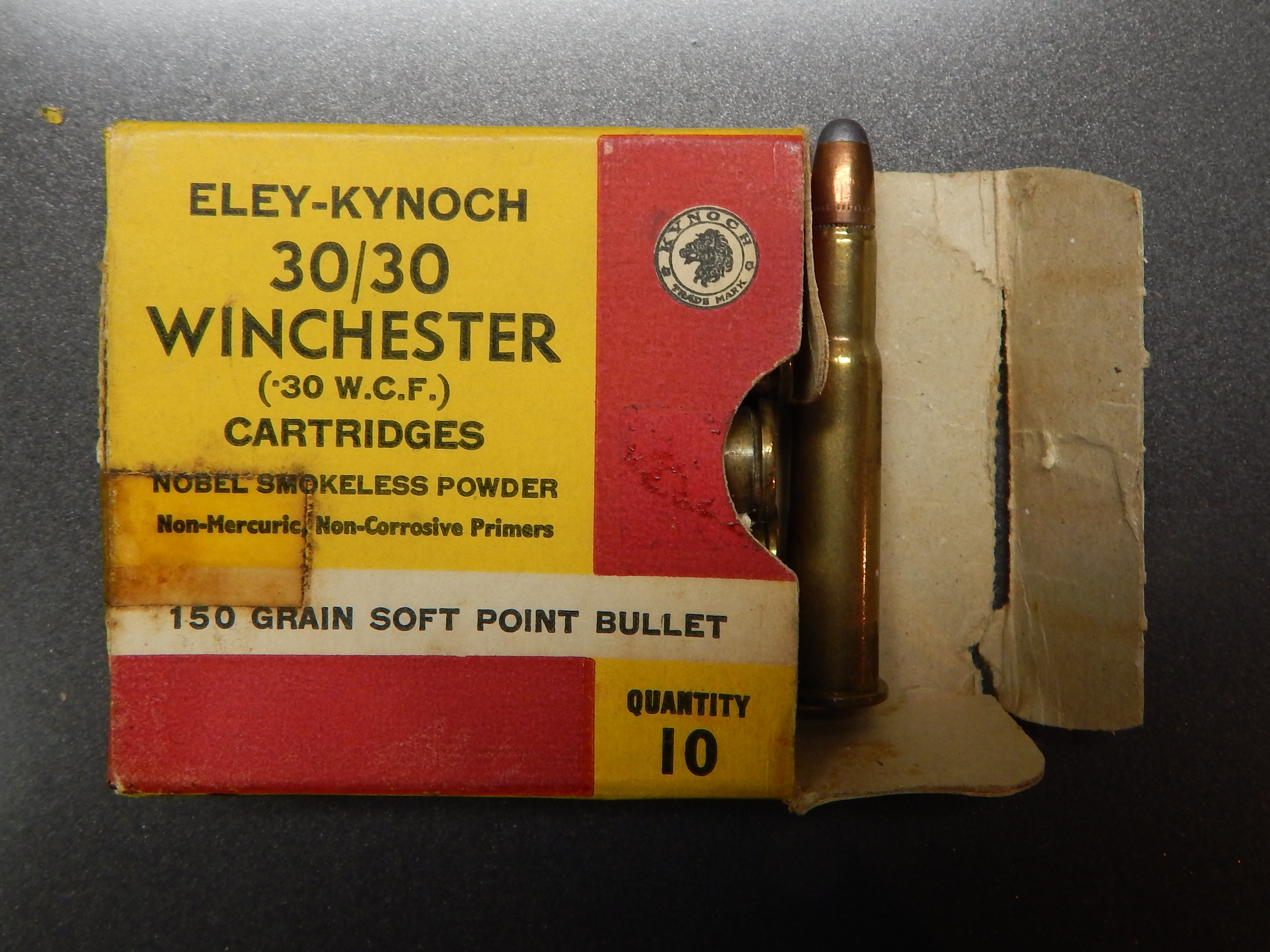
Eley-Kynoch consumer packaging for .30/30 centrefire rifle cartridges (front)

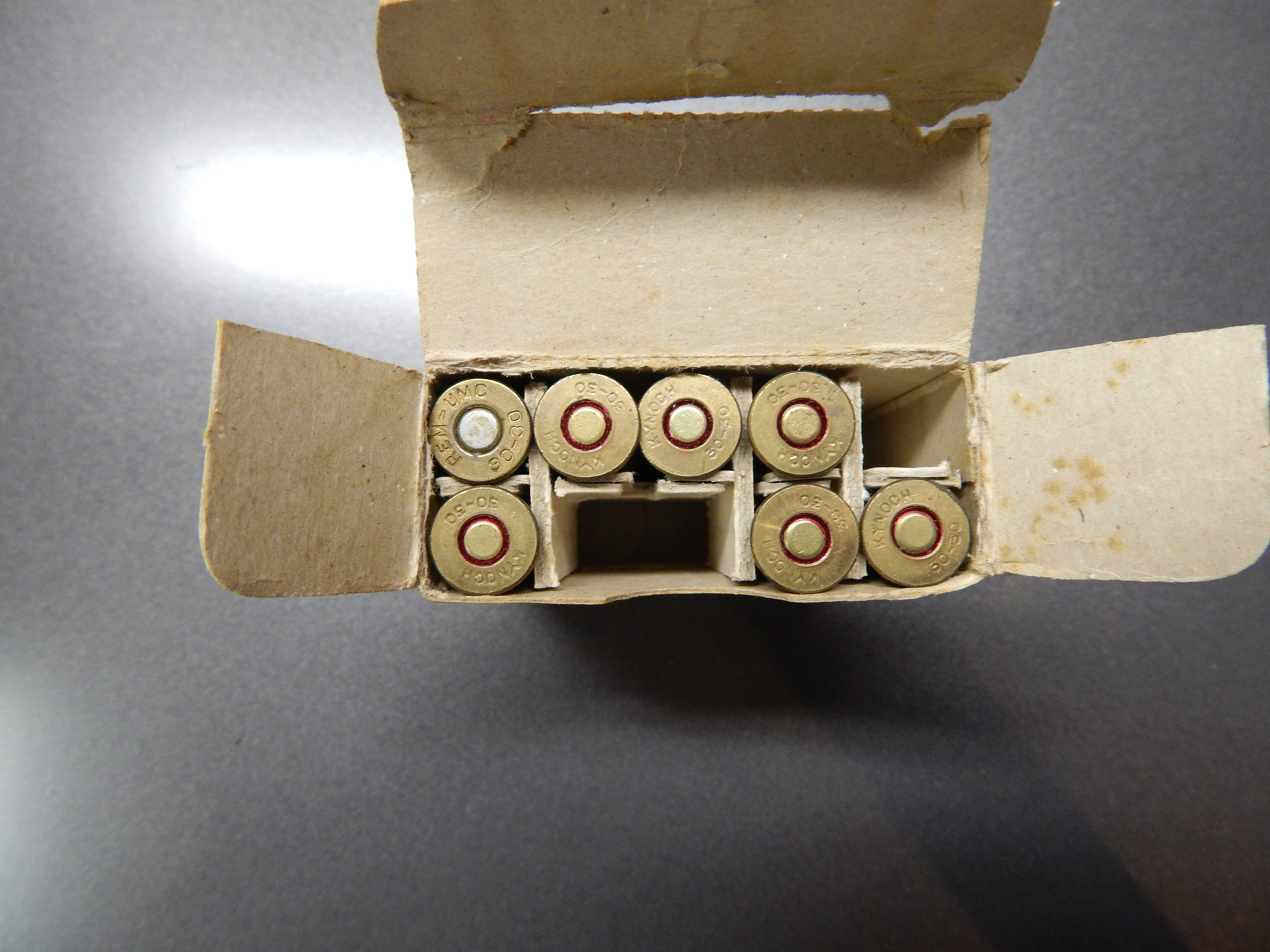
Eley-Kynoch consumer packaging (inside of packaging) for .30/30 centrefire rounds. Headstamp is "KYNOCH 30-30"

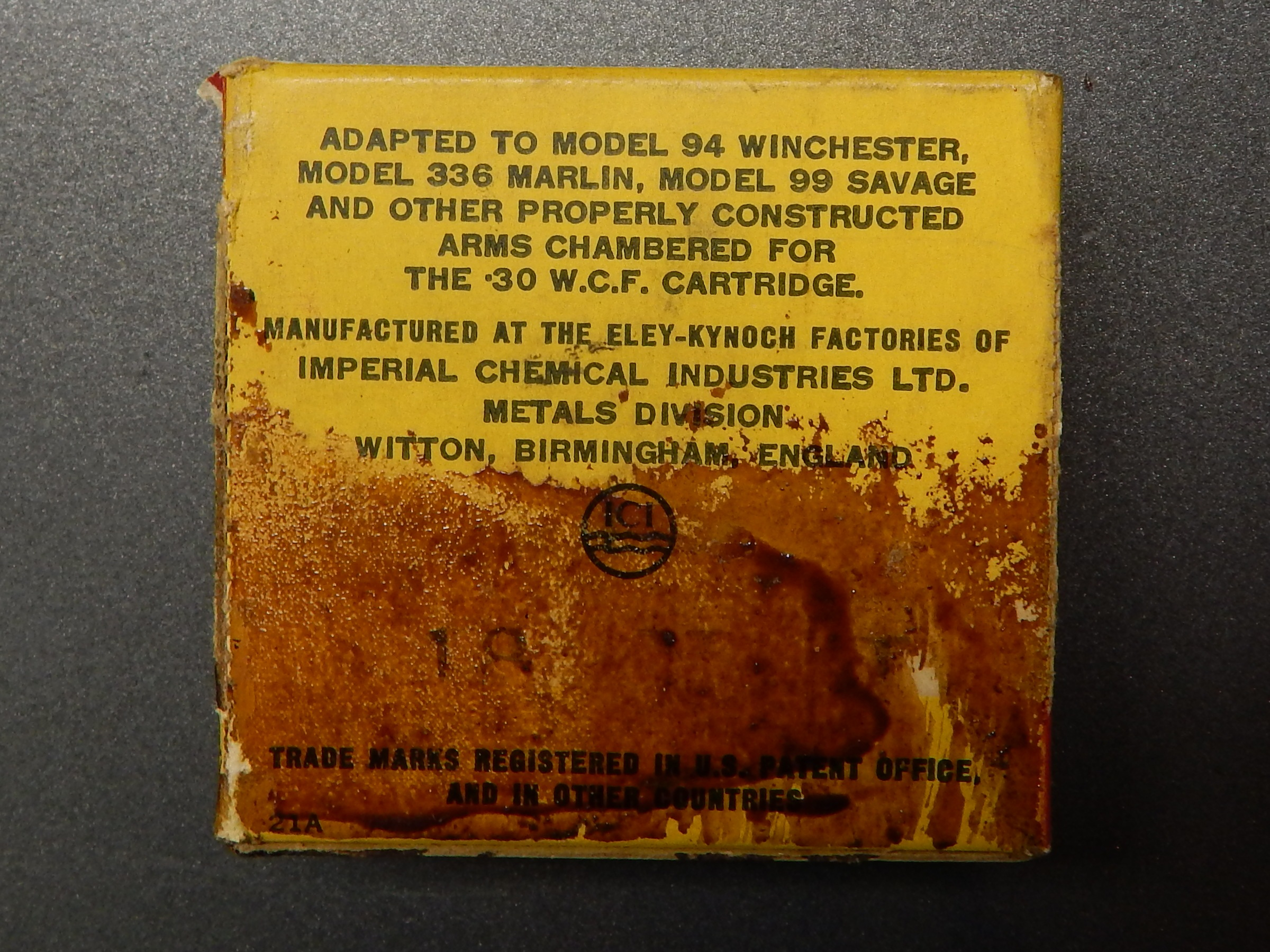
Eley-Kynoch consumer packaging for .30/30 centrefire rifle cartridges

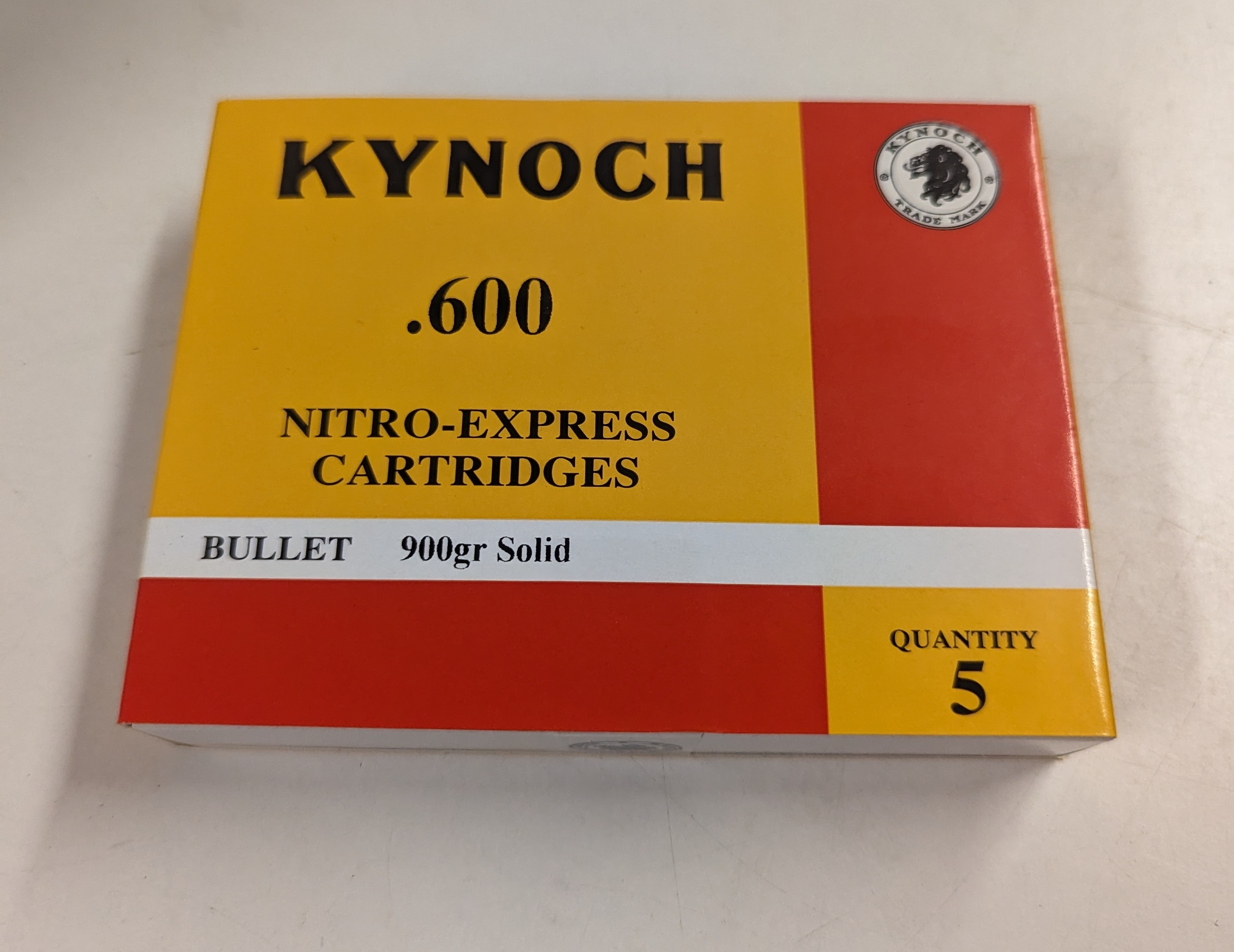
.600NE produced by Kynamco Ltd in 2023. The packaging has had the same styling since 1936.

== See also ==
- John Sutton Nettlefold JP - former managing director
- Eley Brothers
- Corringham Light Railway
