= Ann Rockley =

Canadian content manager

Ann Rockley is a Canadian content manager. She is the founder and President of The Rockley Group, based in the greater Toronto Area. She regularly presents papers and workshops on subjects involving the efficient creation, management and delivery of content for organizations in North America and Europe. She was the lead analyst for The XML & Component Content Management Report on Content Management Systems Watch.

== Education and early career ==
At university, Ann Rockley took a Bachelor of Science degree in Astronomy. In the early 1980s, she got her first permanent job as a junior technical writer at I. P. Sharp Associates. She went on to work for Cemcorp, Unisys, and American Express, then formed Information Design Solutions with two partners, Heather Fawcett and Sam Ferdinand. According to Gerlinde Schuller, information design is a complex, interdisciplinary, and experimental art. The partnership consulted in usability, document analysis, SGML, and large-scale online documentation projects.

In 1995, Rockley left Information Design Solutions to start The Rockley Group. She took a master's degree in information science at the University of Toronto while continuing to work at The Rockley Group full-time.

== Involvement with the STC ==
In the mid-1980s, Rockley took the initiative to revive the Toronto chapter of the Society for Technical Communication, a professional organization for technical communicators, by getting in touch with the international organization's representative for her area, Rennie Charles. The chapter was founded in 1959 but had been dormant for several years. She and Michelle Hutchinson, another technical communicator, assembled a group of their colleagues and presented a plan to hold regular meetings, find speakers of interest, and develop services for technical communicators. The chapter has been active ever since. Among other things, Rockley served as chapter president, produced the newsletter, and was general manager for a very successful three-day, multi-stream conference in 1989. (Hutchinson served as chapter president, produced the newsletter, and organized the hosting of the international society's annual conference in 1997.)

When Toronto hosted the international conference, Rockley proposed producing the conference proceedings on CD as well as in book form. She also volunteered to produce the CDs for the 2500 attendees. That was the first time it had been done. The machine-readable format proved to be so popular that it has been provided in one form or another ever since.

Rockley regularly presents papers and workshops at the annual meeting of the international Society for Technical Communication. She was named an Associate Fellow of the STC for her contributions to the profession, and in 2005 became a Fellow, the Society's highest honor.

== Teaching and writing ==
Ann Rockley helped to develop the Information Design certificate program at the University of Toronto. She has taught courses in the program (information design and enterprise content management).

Rockley is the lead author of a 2002 book, Managing Enterprise Content: A Unified Content Strategy. It has become a standard reference manual for content management. Her methodology includes return on investment calculations, which can justify the content management effort to executives.

She is also the lead author of a 2009 book, DITA 101: Fundamentals of DITA for Authors and Managers, co-authored with Charles Cooper and Steve Manning. It is a beginner's guide to understanding the Darwin Information Typing Architecture (DITA), an XML-based architecture for authoring, producing, and delivering information.

Rockley's 2015 book, Intelligent Content: A Primer, was co-authored with Charles Cooper and Scott Abel. It is a beginner's guide to creating intelligent content—defined as content which is not limited to one purpose, technology or output—and overcoming the challenges to its adoption. Intelligent Content was published by XML Press.

== Innovation ==
Facing challenges such as putting online 10,000+ pages of documentation for a nuclear power plant, Rockley has been an innovator in devising ways to handle large quantities of online information. She has progressed from information design and online documentation through single sourcing to content management for entire enterprises. She pioneered content reuse using a unified content strategy and was among the first content strategists to regularly incorporate the use of XML for implementing that strategy.

== Involvement with CM Pros ==
As her interests became more specialized, Rockley went on to help found another professional organization, the Content Management Professionals (CM Pros), in 2004. She served as the president in 2005.

== Involvement with OASIS ==
Ann Rockley is a member of the Organization for the Advancement of Structured Information Standards (OASIS). It is a "not-for-profit consortium that drives the development, convergence and adoption of open standards for the global information society". She is the Co-Chair of the DITA for Enterprise Business Documents Subcommittee

== Bibliography ==
- Rockley, Ann; Cooper, Charles (2012). Managing Enterprise Content: A Unified Content Strategy. Berkeley, CA: New Rider Books. ISBN 978-0132931649.
- Rockley, Ann; Cooper, Charles; Abel, Scott (2015). Intelligent Content: A Primer. Laguna Hills, CA: XML Press. ISBN 978-1937434465.
