= 1943 Birmingham Aston by-election =

UK Parliamentary by-election

The 1943 Birmingham Aston by-election was held on 9 June 1943. The by-election was held due to the death during World War II of the incumbent Conservative MP, Edward Kellett. It was won by the Conservative candidate Redvers Prior.

Birmingham Aston by-election, 1943
Party	Candidate	Votes	%	±%
Conservative	Redvers Prior	6,316	72.4	+3.6
Common Wealth	G Hall	1,886	21.6	New
Independent	S H Davis	515	6.0	New
Majority		4,430	50.8	+13.2
Turnout		8,717		
Conservative hold		Swing		
