= Aston Manor (constituency) =

Parliamentary constituency in the United Kingdom, 1885–1918

- Former borough constituency for the House of Commons
- County: Warwickshire
- Major settlements: Aston

1885–1918
- Seats: 1
- Created from: North Warwickshire
- Replaced by: Birmingham Aston, Birmingham Duddeston and Birmingham Erdington

Aston Manor was a constituency of the House of Commons of the Parliament of the United Kingdom. It existed from 1885 until 1918, and elected one Member of Parliament (MP) by the first-past-the-post system of election.

== Boundaries ==
1885–1918: The local government district of Aston Manor.

The constituency was created, as a borough constituency in Warwickshire, for the 1885 general election. In 1885, the area was to the north of the Birmingham parliamentary borough. Birmingham, which from 1889 was a county borough with city status, gradually expanded into adjacent areas.

The constituency bordered to the west Handsworth; to the north and east Tamworth and to the south Birmingham East and Birmingham North.

By 1918 the Aston area had been incorporated within the growing city of Birmingham. For the 1918 general election, the Aston Manor constituency was abolished, and parts of its territory were incorporated in a new borough constituency known as Birmingham Aston. The new seat comprised parts of the then County Borough of Birmingham wards of All Saints, Aston, Lozells and St. Mary's. The seat was smaller and more the northern part of central Birmingham than Aston Manor had been.

== Members of Parliament ==
Election	Member	Party
1885	Hugh Reid	Liberal
1886	George Kynoch	Conservative
1891 by-election	George Grice-Hutchinson	Conservative
1900	Sir Evelyn Cecil	Conservative
1918	constituency abolished. See Birmingham Aston	

== Elections ==
=== Elections in the 1880s ===
General election 1885: Aston Manor
Party	Candidate	Votes	%	±%
Liberal	Hugh Reid	4,241	57.9	
Conservative	Robert Perks Yates	3,088	42.1	
Majority		1,153	15.8	
Turnout		7,329	85.5	
Registered electors		8,571		
Liberal win (new seat)				

General Election 1886: Aston Manor
Party	Candidate	Votes	%	±%
Conservative	George Kynoch	3,495	56.3	+14.2
Liberal	Hugh Reid	2,713	43.7	−14.2
Majority		782	12.6	N/A
Turnout		6,208	72.4	−13.1
Registered electors		8,571		
Conservative gain from Liberal		Swing	+14.2	

=== Elections in the 1890s ===
1891 Aston Manor by-election
Party	Candidate	Votes	%	±%
Conservative	George Grice-Hutchinson	5,310	69.5	+13.2
Liberal	William Beale	2,332	30.5	−13.2
Majority		2,978	39.0	+26.4
Turnout		7,642	76.8	+4.4
Registered electors		9,950		
Conservative hold		Swing	+13.2	

General election 1892: Aston Manor
Party	Candidate	Votes	%	±%
Conservative	George Grice-Hutchinson	5,300	80.1	+23.8
Independent Labour	I. Ward	1,313	19.9	New
Majority		3,987	60.2	+47.6
Turnout		6,613	63.4	−9.0
Registered electors		10,431		
Conservative hold		Swing		

General election 1895: Aston Manor
Party	Candidate	Votes	%	±%
Conservative	George Grice-Hutchinson	5,353	76.2	−3.9
Lib-Lab	John Lawson	1,675	23.8	New
Majority		3,678	52.4	−7.8
Turnout		7,028	64.2	+0.8
Registered electors		10,952		
Conservative hold		Swing		

=== Elections in the 1900s ===
General election 29 September 1900: Aston Manor
Party	Candidate	Votes	%	±%
Conservative	Evelyn Cecil	Unopposed		
Conservative hold				

General election 1906: Aston Manor
Party	Candidate	Votes	%	±%
Conservative	Evelyn Cecil	7,134	74.6	N/A
Liberal	John A. Richardson	2,431	25.4	New
Majority		4,703	49.2	N/A
Turnout		9,565	78.7	N/A
Registered electors		12,149		
Conservative hold		Swing	N/A	

=== Elections in the 1910s ===
General election January 1910: Aston Manor
Party	Candidate	Votes	%	±%
Conservative	Evelyn Cecil	7,369	79.3	+4.7
Liberal	Joseph H. Allen	1,928	20.7	−4.7
Majority		5,441	58.6	+9.4
Turnout		11,894	78.2	−0.5
Conservative hold		Swing		

General election December 1910: Aston Manor
Party	Candidate	Votes	%	±%
Conservative	Evelyn Cecil	Unopposed		
Conservative hold				

== See also ==
- Aston Manor
- List of former United Kingdom Parliament constituencies
