= Dave Bowman (trade unionist) =

Scottish trade unionist and activist (1913–1996)

David P. Bowman (March 1913 – March 1996) was a Scottish trade unionist and political activist.

Born in Dundee, Bowman worked briefly in a biscuit factory and a bakery before following his father in working on the railways. In 1930, he became an engine cleaner, but he was made redundant two months later. He then worked as a salesman, while spending his spare time reading about politics, and also about Robert Burns. In about 1935, he joined the Labour League of Youth, associated with the Labour Party. He returned to the railways in 1936, joining the National Union of Railwaymen (NUR). Inspired by its activity in the Spanish Civil War, in 1940 he joined the Communist Party of Great Britain (CPGB), and the following year was expelled by Labour for supporting the People's Convention.

Bowman stood for the CPGB in Dundee East at the 1950 UK general election, then at Dundee West at every election from 1951 to 1966, coming last and losing his deposit on each occasion. Despite his lack of success, he became a well-known figure in the city's politics. He was noted for campaigning against protectionism in the jute trade, arguing instead for a campaign for higher wages for jute workers in India.

In the 1950s and 1960s, Bowman served on the National Executive Committee of the NUR, and argued that the union should more strongly oppose the Beeching Plan. He was part of a union delegation to the Soviet Union in 1956, during which Jim Campbell and Tom Hollywood were killed in a car crash. As a member of the CPGB, he was ineligible to stand for the presidency of the union. However, in 1970, he resigned from the CPGB and joined the Labour Party, and in 1975 he stood and was elected as president. He served alongside the anti-communist general secretary Sidney Weighell, who later wrote that they "managed to reach an understanding" and that Bowman was a "strong president". During his time in office, he argued against the British Rail pension trustees investing in art, and appeared on the Jimmy Young radio show.

Trade union offices
Preceded by Harold McRitchie	President of the National Union of Railwaymen; 1975–1978	Succeeded by Alun Rees
