= Birmingham Aston =

Parliamentary constituency in the United Kingdom, 1918–1974

Coordinates: 52.5°N 1.88°W

- Former borough constituency for the House of Commons
- County: West Midlands
- Major settlements: Aston

1918–1974
- Seats: One
- Created from: Aston Manor
- Replaced by: Birmingham Erdington (Majority) and Birmingham Handsworth

Birmingham Aston was a constituency of the House of Commons of the Parliament of the United Kingdom. From 1918 to 1974 it elected one Member of Parliament (MP) by the first-past-the-post system of election.

== History ==
The constituency was created for the 1918 general election, when the boundaries of the city of Birmingham had been expanded. One of the areas included in the city's expansion was the Aston area, which had formerly been part of Warwickshire. From 1885 to 1918, Aston Manor was a borough constituency in Warwickshire.

== Boundaries ==
1918–1950: Parts of the County Borough of Birmingham wards of All Saints', Aston, Lozells, and St Mary's. The newly created seat was smaller and more the northern part of central Birmingham than Aston Manor had been.

1950–1955: The County Borough of Birmingham wards of Aston, Lozells, and St Paul's.

1955–1974: The County Borough of Birmingham wards of Aston, Gravelley Hill, and Stockland Green. The latter two wards had formerly been part of Birmingham Erdington. St Paul's ward became part of Birmingham Ladywood. Lozells ward was transferred to Birmingham Handsworth.

In the 1974 redistribution, this constituency disappeared. Aston ward became part of Birmingham Handsworth, while Gravelley Hill and Stockland Green wards became part of Birmingham Erdington.

== Members of Parliament ==
Election	Member	Party	Notes
1918	Sir Evelyn Cecil	Conservative	Member for Aston Manor (1900–1918)
1929	John Strachey	Labour	
February 1931	John Strachey	New	
June 1931	John Strachey	Independent Socialist	
October 1931	Arthur Hope	Conservative	Appointed Governor of Madras Presidency
1939 by-election	Edward Kellett	Conservative	Died March 1943
1943 by-election	Redvers Prior	Conservative	
1945	Woodrow Wyatt	Labour	Contested Grantham following redistribution
Constituency split, majority joined Ladywood, minority merged with the abolished Erdington
1955	Julius Silverman	Labour	Member for Birmingham Erdington (1945–1955); Contested Birmingham Erdington following redistribution
Feb 1974	constituency abolished		

== Elections ==
=== Elections in the 1910s ===
General election 1918: Birmingham Aston
Party		Candidate	Votes	%
C	Unionist	Evelyn Cecil	9,997	62.4
	Labour	William Banfield	4,451	27.8
	NFDDSS	James Henry Dooley	1,561	9.8
Majority			5,546	34.6
Turnout			16,009	45.2
Registered electors				
	Unionist win (new seat)			
C indicates candidate endorsed by the coalition government.

=== Elections in the 1920s ===
General election 1922: Birmingham Aston
Party	Candidate	Votes	%	±%
Unionist	Evelyn Cecil	15,913	60.8	−1.6
Labour	Joe Cotter	10,279	39.2	+11.4
Majority		5,634	21.6	−13.0
Turnout		26,192	72.5	+27.3
Registered electors		36,113		
Unionist hold		Swing	−6.5	

General election 1923: Birmingham Aston
Party	Candidate	Votes	%	±%
Unionist	Evelyn Cecil	13,291	56.2	−4.6
Labour	P. Bower	7,541	31.8	−7.4
Liberal	Joseph Conyers Tillotson	2,846	12.0	New
Majority		5,750	24.4	+2.8
Turnout		23,678	65.0	−7.5
Registered electors		36,416		
Unionist hold		Swing	+1.4	

General election 1924: Birmingham Aston
Party	Candidate	Votes	%	±%
Unionist	Evelyn Cecil	14,244	54.6	−1.6
Labour	John Strachey	11,859	45.4	+13.6
Majority		2,385	9.2	−15.2
Turnout		26,103	71.7	+6.7
Registered electors		36,391		
Unionist hold		Swing	−7.6	

General election 1929: Birmingham Aston
Party	Candidate	Votes	%	±%
Labour	John Strachey	18,672	52.2	+6.8
Unionist	John Whiteley	17,114	47.8	−6.8
Majority		1,558	4.4	N/A
Turnout		35,786	78.3	+6.6
Registered electors		45,687		
Labour gain from Unionist		Swing	+6.8	

=== Elections in the 1930s ===
General election 1931: Birmingham Aston
Party	Candidate	Votes	%	±%
Conservative	Arthur Hope	22,959	70.9	+23.1
Labour	T. J. May	6,212	19.2	−33.0
Ind. Socialist	John Strachey	3,236	10.0	New
Majority		16,747	51.7	N/A
Turnout		32,407	73.5	−4.8
Registered electors				
Conservative gain from Labour		Swing		

General election 1935: Birmingham Aston
Party	Candidate	Votes	%	±%
Conservative	Arthur Hope	18,933	68.8	−2.1
Labour	Rudolph Putnam Messel	8,578	31.2	+12.0
Majority		10,355	37.6	−14.1
Turnout		27,511	64.5	−9.0
Registered electors				
Conservative hold		Swing		

1939 Birmingham Aston by-election
Party	Candidate	Votes	%	±%
Conservative	Edward Kellett	12,033	66.3	−2.5
Labour	Samuel Segal	6,122	33.7	+2.5
Majority		5,911	32.6	−5.0
Turnout		18,155		
Registered electors				
Conservative hold		Swing		

=== Elections in the 1940s ===
1943 Birmingham Aston by-election
Party	Candidate	Votes	%	±%
Conservative	Redvers Prior	6,316	72.4	+3.6
Common Wealth	Gilbert Hall	1,886	21.6	New
Independent	Samuel Henry Davis	515	6.0	New
Majority		4,430	50.8	+13.2
Turnout		8,717		
Registered electors		39,262		
Conservative hold		Swing		

General election 1945: Birmingham Aston
Party	Candidate	Votes	%	±%
Labour	Woodrow Wyatt	15,031	61.9	+30.7
Conservative	Frederick Bruce Normansell	9,264	38.1	+6.9
Majority		5,767	23.8	N/A
Turnout		24,295	67.75	
Registered electors				
Labour gain from Conservative		Swing		

=== Elections in the 1950s ===
General election 1950: Birmingham Aston
Party	Candidate	Votes	%
Labour	Woodrow Wyatt	28,867	60.8
Conservative	Charles Doughty	16,826	35.4
Liberal	Arthur Embrey	1,487	3.1
Independent	SW Keatley	338	0.7
Majority		12,041	25.4
Turnout		47,518	78.4
Registered electors			
Labour win (new boundaries)			

General election 1951: Birmingham Aston
Party	Candidate	Votes	%	±%
Labour	Woodrow Wyatt	27,899	62.6	+1.8
Conservative	Clement Sweet	16,136	36.2	+0.8
Independent	SW Keatley	545	1.2	+0.5
Majority		11,763	26.4	+1.0
Turnout		44,580	74.6	−3.8
Registered electors				
Labour hold		Swing		

General election 1955: Birmingham Aston
Party	Candidate	Votes	%
Labour	Julius Silverman	25,546	59.7
Conservative	Frances Vale	17,284	40.4
Majority		8,262	19.3
Turnout		42,830	71.6
Registered electors			
Labour win (new boundaries)			

General election 1959: Birmingham Aston
Party	Candidate	Votes	%	±%
Labour	Julius Silverman	21,518	53.1	−6.6
Conservative	Anthony Beaumont-Dark	18,894	46.8	+6.4
Majority		2,534	6.3	−13.0
Turnout		40,412	70.3	−1.3
Registered electors				
Labour hold		Swing		

=== Elections in the 1960s ===
General election 1964: Birmingham Aston
Party	Candidate	Votes	%	±%
Labour	Julius Silverman	19,512	54.7	+1.6
Conservative	Anthony Beaumont-Dark	16,146	45.3	−1.5
Majority		3,366	9.4	+3.1
Turnout		35,658	65.4	−4.9
Registered electors				
Labour hold		Swing		

General election 1966: Birmingham Aston
Party	Candidate	Votes	%	±%
Labour	Julius Silverman	20,716	60.9	+6.2
Conservative	Joseph R Kinsey	13,316	39.1	−6.2
Majority		7,400	21.8	+12.4
Turnout		34,032	64.2	−1.2
Registered electors				
Labour hold		Swing		

=== Elections in the 1970s ===
General election 1970: Birmingham Aston
Party	Candidate	Votes	%	±%
Labour	Julius Silverman	15,456	55.1	−5.8
Conservative	Arthur A Hill	11,894	42.4	+3.3
British Movement	Colin Jordan	704	2.5	New
Majority		3,562	12.7	−9.1
Turnout		28,054	58.8	−5.4
Registered electors				
Labour hold		Swing		

== See also ==
- List of former United Kingdom Parliament constituencies
