= George Kynoch (businessman) =

George Kynoch (22 August 1834 – 28 February 1891) was the founder of IMI plc, one of the United Kingdom's largest engineering businesses.

== Biography ==
George Kynoch was born at Peterhead in Aberdeenshire and educated at the local school. He first worked as an insurance clerk in Glasgow and then as a bank clerk in Worcester.

After working for a while at larger bank branch in Birmingham, in 1856 the Scottish entrepreneur decided to join Pursall & Phillips, percussion cap manufacturers, in Birmingham. An explosion in 1859 destroyed the works, killing 19 of the 70 employees. As a result, the firm moved to a site on four acres of land at Witton in 1862, on a site adjacent to the London and North Western Railway's Grand Junction line. In 1863, Kynoch took over the business, which was subsequently renamed G. Kynoch and Co. A further series of explosions in the 1860s and in 1870 led to dozens of deaths and hundreds of injuries.

In 1863, Kynoch took over the business, which was subsequently renamed G. Kynoch and Co. The Lion Works, as it became known, quickly secured contracts to supply ammunition to the British and Turkish Governments. In 1884 his interests were bought out and he was simply employed as managing director.

In 1886, he became Member of Parliament for Aston Manor and in 1887 he was appointed president of Aston Villa Football Club. These roles distracted him from his business and in 1888 he was forced to resign.

== Personal life ==
In 1863, he married Helen Birley. They later separated.

== Death ==
He emigrated to South Africa and died in Johannesburg in 1891, aged 56.

Parliament of the United Kingdom
Preceded by Hugh Gilzean-Reid	Member of Parliament for Aston Manor; 1886–1891	Succeeded by George Grice-Hutchinson
