= Lytchett Heath =

Coordinates: 50.754°N 2.054°W

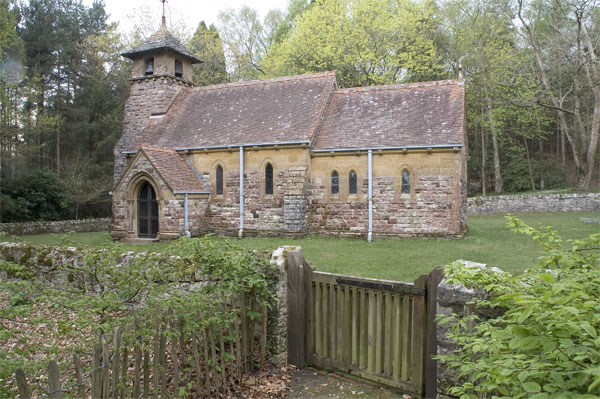
St Aldhelm's Chapel, Lytchett Heath

Lytchett Heath is an area of woods and farmland on the Dorset Heaths between the villages of Lytchett Matravers, Lytchett Minster and the hamlet of Beacon Hill in the county of Dorset, England. Part of it is a reserve managed jointly by the Dorset Wildlife Trust and the Amphibian and Reptile Conservation Trust. St Aldhelm's was built in 1898 as a private church for Lord Eustace Cecil.

== Etymology ==
The name of Lytchett Heath is first attested in the Domesday Book of 1086 as Lichet. This name comes from the Brittonic words that survive in modern Welsh as llwyd ("grey") and coed ("wood").
