= Sybil Lupp =

New Zealand motor-racing driver

- Born: Sybil Audrey Marie Colley; 1 August 1916; Clive, Hawke's Bay, New Zealand
- Died: December 26, 1994 (aged 78)
- Occupations: Mechanic, motor-racing driver, garage proprietor, motor vehicle dealer.

Sybil Audrey Marie Lupp (later Archer, née Colley; 1 August 1916 – 26 December 1994) was a New Zealand mechanic, motor-racing driver, garage proprietor and motor vehicle dealer, known as the Jaguar Lady.

== Early life ==
Sybil Audrey Marie Colley was born in Clive, Hawke's Bay, New Zealand on 1 August 1916. Her parents Ethel Violet Mary Goulter and Joseph Wellesley Colley owned Greenfields, a sheep farm. Her father was declared bankrupt in February 1923 and the family moved to Marlborough where her mother had roots dating back to the foundation of the province.

The young Sybil was interested in mechanics at an early age, preferring building model railways and playing with Meccano. She later said ‘They all laughed when I asked for boys’ toys, but I used to get them in the end.’ Family lore recorded that aged four she smashed a dolls’ tea-set as she wanted a present with ‘wheels and things’. Whilst still very young, she wired a large magneto to a toilet seat and zapped her father sufficiently to cause him to fly out of the outhouse door. She was educated at home by governesses and competed at country shows on ponies. Her father loved fast cars and taught Sybil to drive by the time she was 11. By age 14 she was driving an M-type MG her father had bought her. However, Sybil's ambition to be a mechanical engineer was not considered suitable by her parents, although she managed to take a correspondence course in car maintenance, using the family cars and farm machinery to practice and tried to find a job in garages without her family's knowledge.

== Career ==
In 1936 she took a job at the canning factory in Nelson run by S. Kirkpatrick and Company and persuaded the chief engineer to let her work in the machine workshop. He helped her get a job at J. G. Ingram and Company’s garage in 1938. She worked there until 1940 when she had her first child, after marrying the sales manager in 1939.

During World War II, Sybil Lupp was a driver in the New Zealand Women’s Auxiliary Air Force. She worked on vehicle maintenance, and trained on diesel engines.

Lupp and her second husband were amongst the founders the Otago Sports Car Club and she raced in their events for the next decade. In 1947-8 she was the club’s delegate and first woman member of the executive of the new Association of New Zealand Car Clubs.

Lupp won several Otago championship trophies in hill-climbing and the standing-start quarter-mile sprints, including South Island hill-climb champion in 1949. In 1951 and 1952 she was the first woman to win the Otago Automobile Association’s Sundstrum Memorial Trophy. She usually raced in overalls but wore a dress underneath. Lupp was a founder of New Zealand's MG Car Club and raced in MGs for the first part of her career.

In February 1949, Lupp was the only women entrant in the New Zealand Road Racing Championship (later the Lady Wigram Trophy race), the country’s first national circuit car race and came fifth in a field of 22. In 1950 she claimed second place in the championship, and first in the handicap, a result still standing half a century later. She set South Island and New Zealand speed records in the late 1940s and early 1950s.

From the 1950, Lupp focussed on Jaguar cars, and ultimately owned 15 of the vehicles. She built a successful business based on her skills in tuning and mechanical work in high-performance motors. What started as a backyard business grew into a travelling tuning and repair service across both islands of New Zealand and expanded into selling used Jaguars.

By 1957 Lupp moved to Wellington and worked seven day weeks in her workshop, which was nicknamed ‘the cave’. She met Lionel George Archer, a Jaguar engineer from England, and they built the business further, registering Jag Service as a company in 1958. By 1961, Lupp employed seven full time mechanics and in 1966 set up Archer and Lupp to sell Jaguars.

From 1970s, Lupp was suffering from rheumatoid arthritis which affected her ability to undertake mechanical work, so she worked more on the sales element of the business. Her son Danie Lupp bought the business assets in 1980, with Sybil a shareholder and involved in sales for the first half of the decade.

She later worked part-time work for a market research company and as a volunteer at the Mary Potter Hospice. She had her gold 1972 E-type V12 custom-painted to match her evening dress. Eventually her arthritis made it too difficult to drive, so she bought a bright red Le Mans XJS with automatic transmission and power steering.

== Personal life ==
On 18 April 1939, Sybil married John (Jack) Morris Charles Lupp at St Mary’s Church, Blenheim. They had a daughter the following year and a son Duane (Danie) in 1945 before Jack's early death from a heart attack in July 1945. He died in debt and Sybil struggled financially. Sybil married her husband's younger brother, Percival Louis Lupp, on 8 April 1947 at the same church as her first wedding. They divorced in 1961, and Sybil married her business partner Lionel George Archer in Taupō Methodist church on 12 April 1969. They remained married until her death in Wellington on 26 December 1994. Lionel Archer died two months later in February 1995. Sybil Lupp's funeral featured a large motorcade put on by the MG Car Club (Wellington Centre) and the local Jaguar Drivers’ Club.

== Recognition ==
Lupp was awarded the New Zealand 1990 Commemoration Medal and, in 1993, the New Zealand Suffrage Centennial Medal.

== Legacy ==
In 2024, as part of International Women's Day, Jaguar Heritage Trust launched an exhibition called "The Women Who Made Their Marque". The exhibition included Lupp in its celebration of women who had contributed to Jaguar and the other marques associated with the brand. Other women featured included:

- Alice Fenton - First woman to be a director of Jaguar Cars.
- Connie Teather - Colleague and Friend of Fenton's
- Bibiana Boerio - First woman to serve as Managing Director of Jaguar
- Joska Bourgeois - Businesswoman and European distributor of Jaguars
- Patricia Lyons - rally driver, daughter of Jaguar Cars founder William Lyons.
- Barbara Bergmeier
- Bill Wisdom - Early woman in motorsport in England
- Lola Grounds - Early woman in motorsport in England
- Denise McCluggage - American racing driver
- Greta, Lady Lyons - Lyons' wife
