= British Motor Museum =

Coordinates: 52.1887°N 1.4806°W

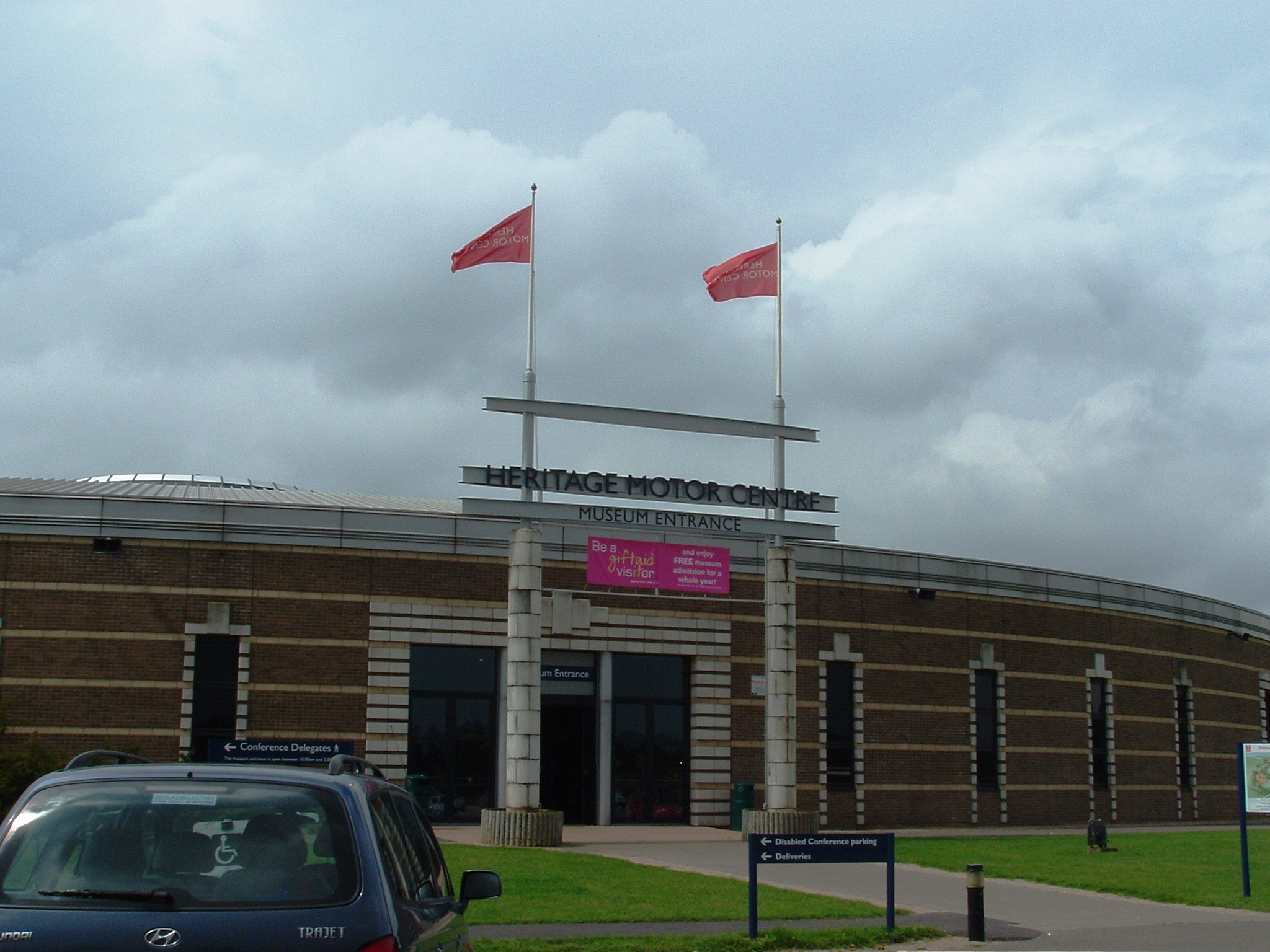
- Former name: Heritage Motor Centre (1993–2015)
- Established: 1993; 33 years ago
- Location: Banbury Road, Gaydon, Warwickshire, England
- Type: Transport Museum
- CEO: Peter Armstrong
- Owner: British Motor Industry Heritage Trust (BMIHT)
- Parking: Free On-Site Parking
- Website: www.britishmotormuseum.co.uk

The British Motor Museum is an automotive museum in Gaydon, Warwickshire, England. It holds the world's largest collection of historic British cars, with over 300 cars on display from the British Motor Industry Heritage Trust and the Jaguar Heritage Trust.

== History ==
The creation of the British Leyland Motor Corporation (BL) in 1968 saw the bringing together of multiple motor vehicle companies and marques (Austin, Jaguar, Morris, MG, Riley, Rover, Standard Triumph, and Wolseley). With many of the companies having their own collections of historic vehicles, in 1975 a centralised Leyland Historic Vehicles department was created to manage these. As the collection got ever larger, in 1983 BL created charitable trusts to ensure that these important collections, not only of vehicles, but of company archives too, would be preserved for the nation. The British Motor Industry Heritage Trust (BMIHT) was created, and under its umbrella, so were the Austin Rover Group Heritage Trust and the Jaguar Daimler Heritage Trust. In 1990, following the acquisition of Jaguar by Ford, the Jaguar Daimler Heritage Trust collection was moved to the Jaguar Browns Lane plant in Coventry. The Austin Rover Group Heritage Trust, which with the company by then having morphed into the Rover Group, became the Rover Group Trust, transferred its collection in its entirety to the BMIHT.

The collection, some of which was located at Syon Park, London, and the remainder being kept at Studley Castle, Warwickshire, continued to grow, and the BMIHT decided that a new building was required to house it all. With financial assistance from the Rover Group, and other benefactors, a large new facility was built, set in 65 acres (260,000 m^{2}) of grounds, on the Rover Group's Gaydon site in Warwickshire (the former RAF Gaydon airfield), and opened as the Heritage Motor Centre in 1993. The trust's complete collection, which included more than 25 vehicles, was relocated to the new centre.

The museum became a Designated Collection when it was added to the "exceptional cultural collections" of the Arts Council England in December 2014.

In 2015, the museum was temporarily closed for a £1.1 million refurbishment and rebranding to take place. Additionally, a new £4 million two-storey Collection Centre was built to house the reserve collection of the trust. The museum was reopened on 13 February 2016 as the British Motor Museum. The new Collection Centre houses about 250 extra vehicles, and is used for both BMIHT and Jaguar Heritage Trust (formerly the Jaguar Daimler Heritage Trust) cars.

Following Jaguar's decision to close their Jaguar Heritage Centre, a small selection of the Jaguar Heritage Collection has been on display at the Museum.

In 2003 more than sixty cars from the collection were auctioned off by the British Motor Industry Heritage Trust; over forty more cars were sold off from the museum in 2006.

=== The Women who made their Marque ===
In 2024, as part of International Women's Day, the British Motor Museum launched an exhibition called "The Women Who Made Their Marque". The exhibition celebrates of women who have contributed to Jaguar and the other marques associated with the brand. Some of the women featured included:

- Alice Fenton – First woman to be a director of Jaguar Cars.
- Connie Teather – Colleague and Friend of Fenton's
- Bibiana Boerio – First woman to serve as Managing Director of Jaguar
- Joska Bourgeois – Businesswoman and European distributor of Jaguars
- Patricia Lyons – Lyons' daughter and rally driver.
- Barbara Bergmeier
- Sybil Lupp – Early woman in motorsport in New Zealand
- Bill Wisdom – Early woman in motorsport in England
- Lola Grounds – Early woman in motorsport in England
- Denise McCluggage – American racing driver
- Greta, Lady Lyons – Lyons' wife

== Vehicles in the collection ==
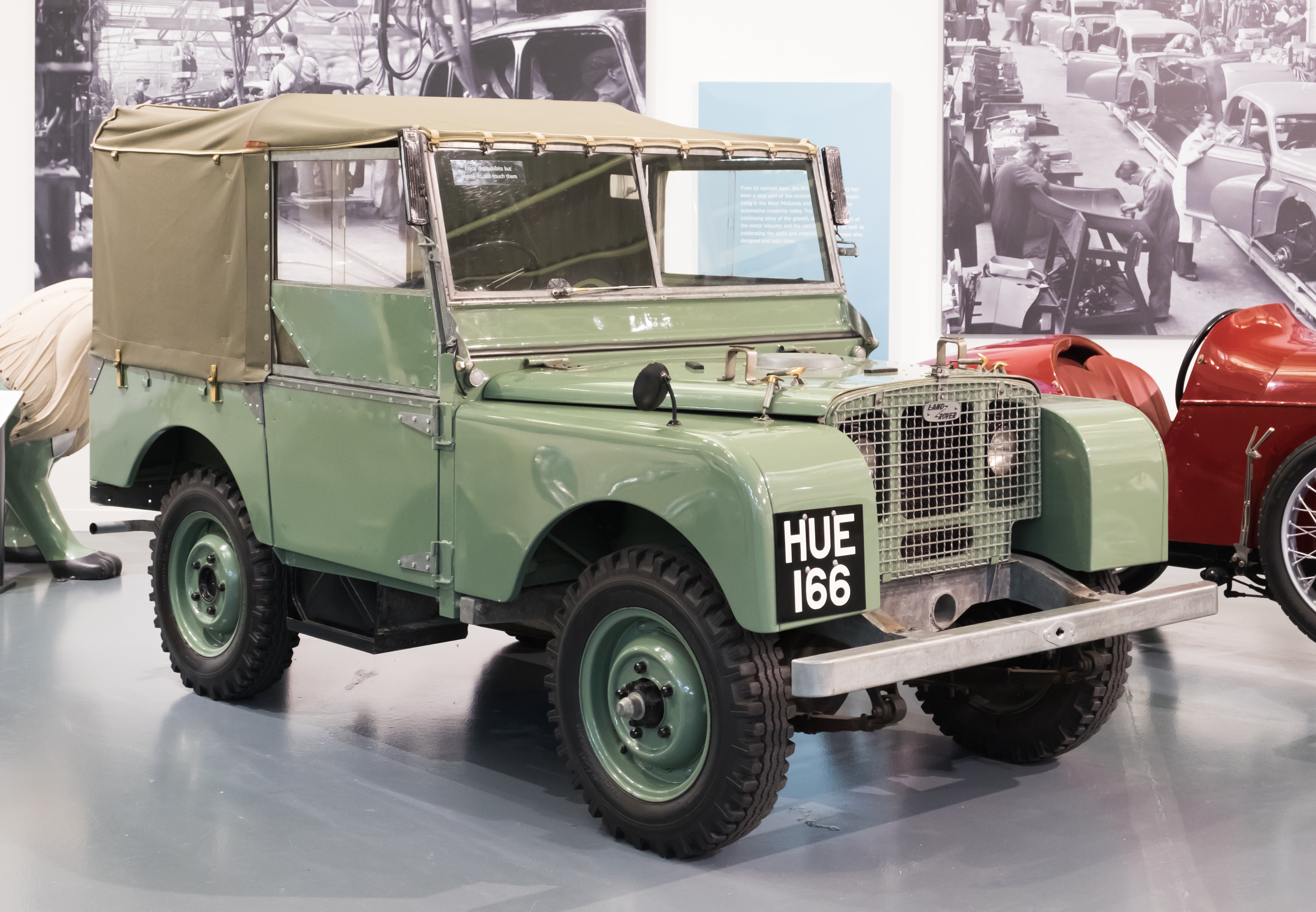
1948 the first production Land Rover HUE 166

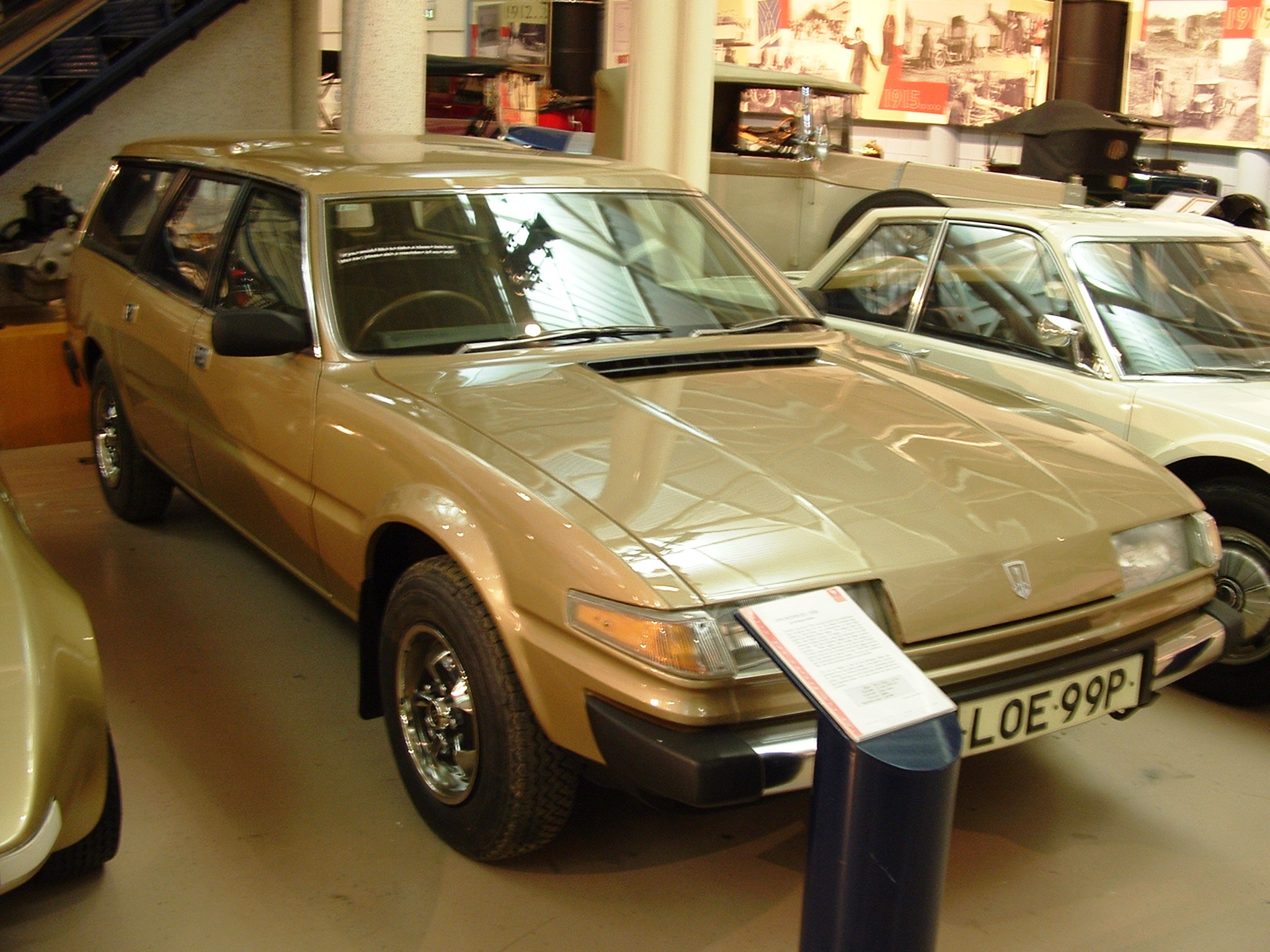
A prototype Rover SD1 Estate

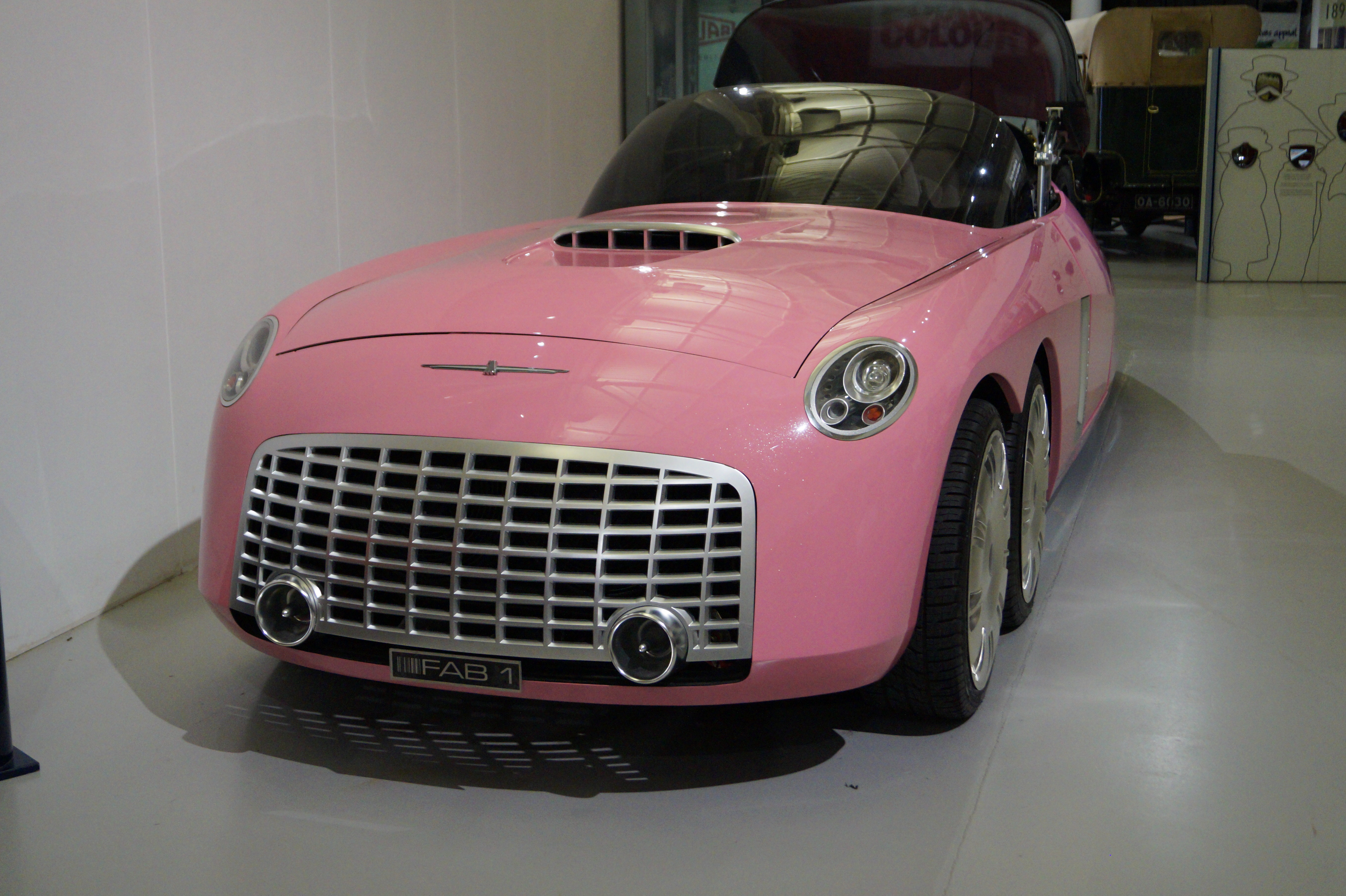
FAB1 car from the 2004 Thunderbird film

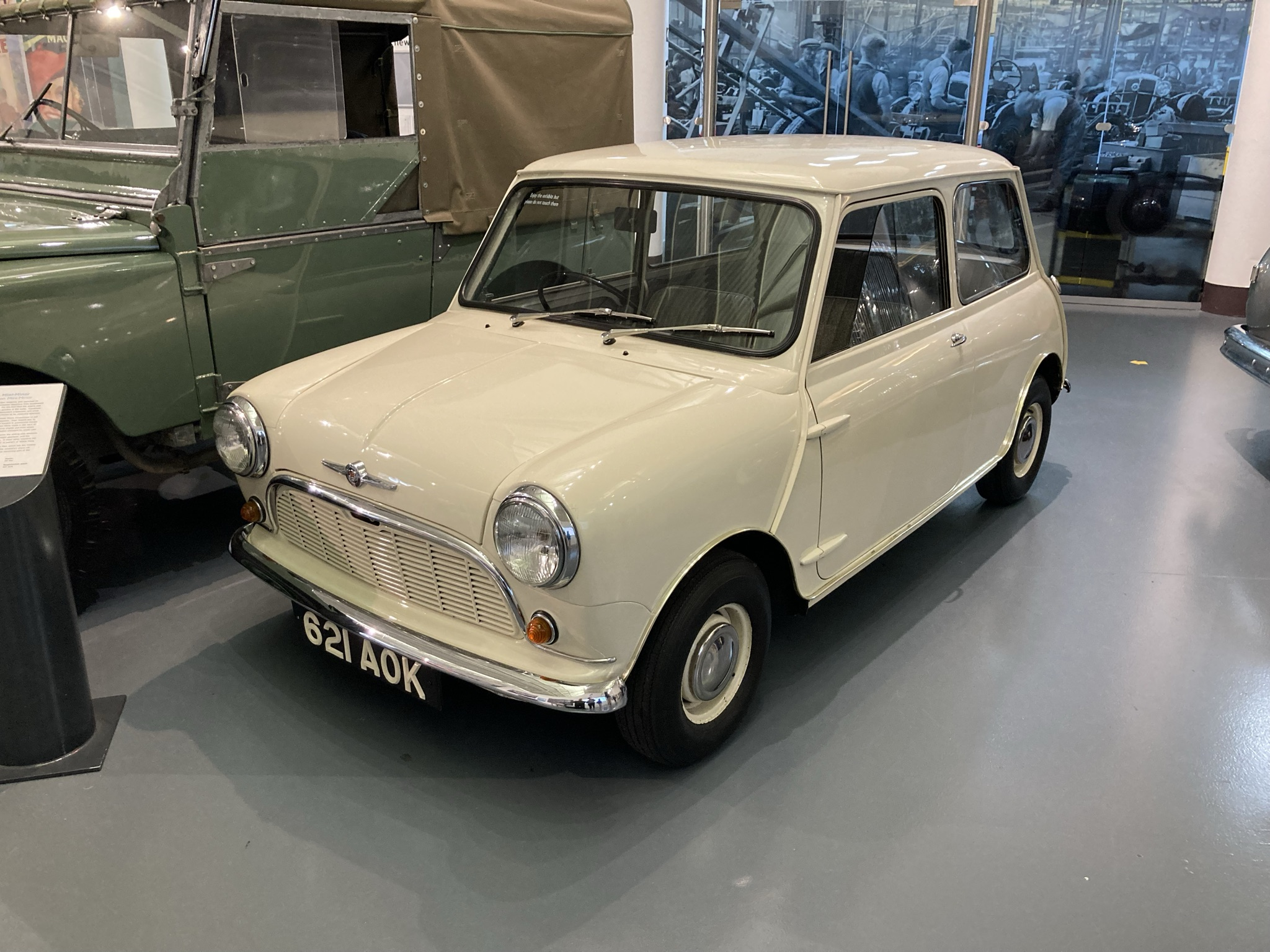
621 AOK the very first Mini off the production line.

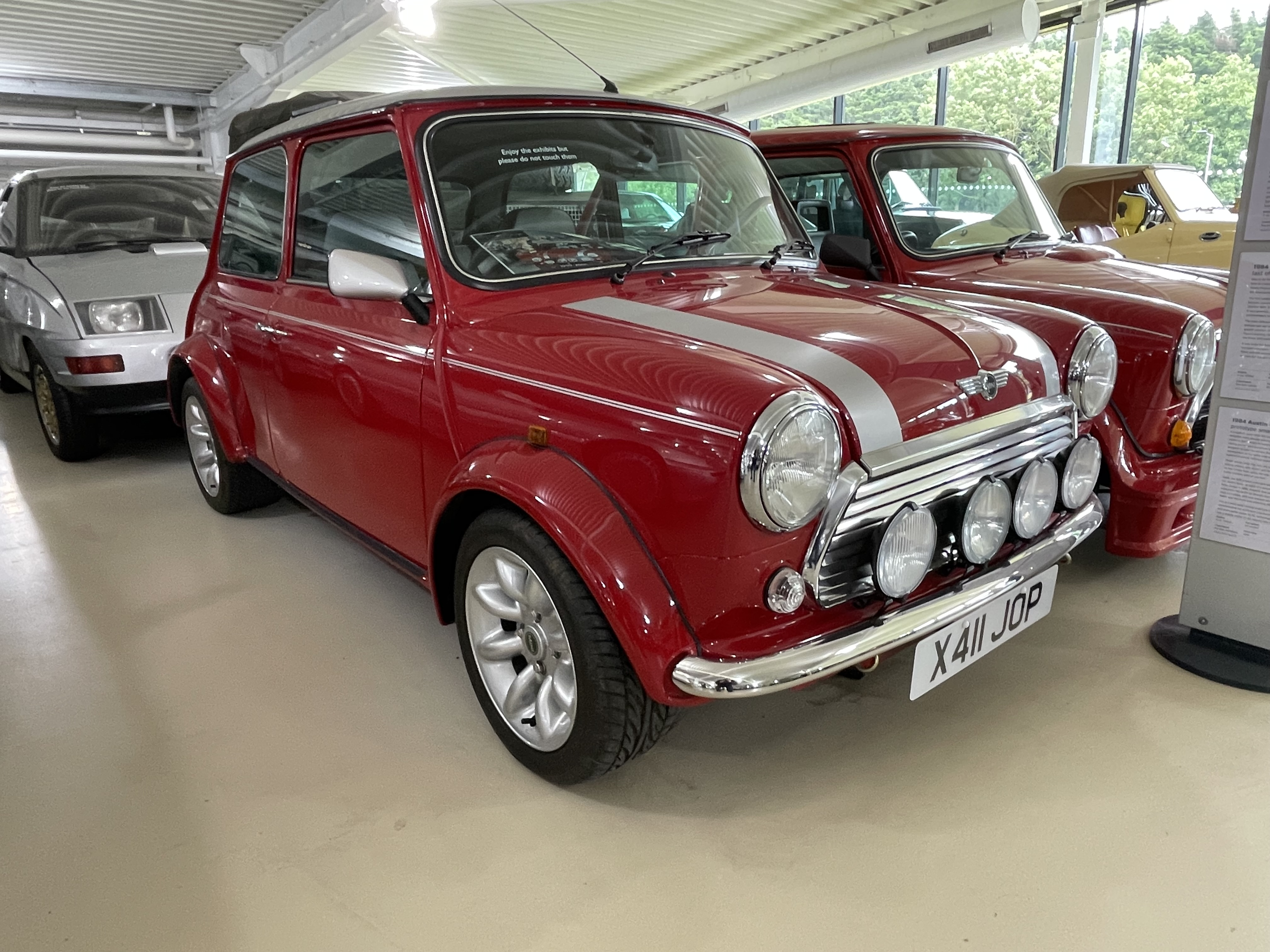
X411 JOP the last ever Mini off the production line, in October 2000.

This is not an exhaustive list — a complete list is provided on the centre's website. Due to space limitations, not all cars are exhibited at all times.

- The very first Land Rover (1948)
- The first and last production models of the Land Rover Freelander
- Various Land Rover, Range Rover, and Rover P5 vehicles used by the British royal family and senior politicians
- An SAS Land Rover
- Prototype Land Rover 101 Recovery Truck
- Shaun the Sheep Land Rover Defender
- Land Rover Series 2 track wheeled off-road vehicle
- Rare Land Rover Llama lorry
- The millionth Land Rover Discovery 4
- The first and last production models of the Rover 75
- Rover Gas Turbine cars
- The Metro 1.3 HLS as shown at the 1980 Motor Show
- Metro 6R4 Rally Car
- Various MG Speed Record cars
- The first Mini produced: 621 AOK
- The last Rover Mini Cooper produced (2000)
- The Minis that won the Monte Carlo Rally during the 1960s
- Various Mini based prototypes, such as the Minissima
- FAB1 from the Thunderbirds film
- An Ascari KZ1 show car from 2000
- Rolls-Royce Phantom
- The last Aston Martin DB7
- Aston Martin V12 Vanquish
- Sinclair C5
- Ford RS200
- The last production Austin Montego
- Jaguar R1 Formula One racecar from 2000
- Nuffield Gutty prototype

== Research services ==
The British Motor Museum offers a research and registry service for several British car marques. The Archive houses authentic historical records by many of the major car manufacturers, including a range of original factory ledgers which record the details of individual vehicles as they came off the production line. For a small fee, owners may send in their Vehicle Identification Number (VIN – aka chassis number) and/or engine numbers, and they will research the original production records for that vehicle and send back whatever information on the vehicle is available. This is a 'Certified Copy of a Factory Record' or more commonly known as a Heritage Certificate. This can include such details as a list of the options the car was ordered with, the original paint colour and any identification numbers that may be missing. This can be useful when applying for tax exemption or to obtain an age-related Registration Mark.
