= Valerie Wise =

English politician

Valerie Wise is a British socialist politician and activist. She is among the fourth generation of Labour Party activists in her family.

Her mother was the late Audrey Wise, MP for Coventry South West 1974–79, then MP for Preston from 1987 until her death in 2000. During this time, Valerie Wise was a parliamentary assistant to her mother. Audrey was well known for her socialist, unionist and feminist views, shared by her daughter Valerie.

Representing Battersea South, Valerie Wise was a significant figure in Ken Livingstone's administration at the Greater London Council. She was chairman of the GLC Women's Committee, the first committee of its kind in UK government. She became chair at age 25, making her the youngest woman elected to a London-wide authority. Many of the issues that the women's committee fought for and supported are now enshrined in UK law. However, some Labour politicians believed these policies contributed to their 1987 general election defeat.

Wise was a Labour councillor in Preston from the 1990s until 2000, when she lost her seat to the Conservatives. In 1995 she was elected Labour Leader of the Council, the first woman to hold the post in Preston. After a falling-out with the chief executive over claims she was attempting to create a socialist republic in Preston, she stood down when a vote of no confidence was passed against her.

The death of her mother in 2000 resulted in a parliamentary by-election in the Preston constituency. She applied for selection as the prospective Labour candidate, but her local party did not select her.

Valerie Wise left the Labour Party in the early 2000s over the Iraq War and interventions in the Middle East. She publicly declared that in 2003 she had voted for a Socialist Alliance council candidate whilst still a Labour Party member and in the 2007 local elections gave her support to a Respect Party candidate. She declared her intention to stand in the 2010 parliamentary election as a candidate for the Trade Unionist and Socialist Coalition (TUSC) against the Labour candidate. She withdrew a few weeks before the election, leaving TUSC without a candidate. She rejoined the Labour Party in August 2015 to support her friend Jeremy Corbyn's bid for leader. She campaigned again for him during the leadership challenge of 2016.

In autumn 2017, Wise stood for selection as the Labour Party Parliamentary candidate in the Rossendale and Darwen constituency, but was unsuccessful. She is currently the Labour Party councillor for Fishwick & Frenchwood ward, having been elected in the 2022 Preston City Council election.

Due to her contribution to women's liberation over years, her oral history is kept in the British Library.
