= International Trade Select Committee =

The International Trade Select Committee was a select committee of the British House of Commons that existed from 2016 to 2023. It oversaw the operations of the now defunct Department for International Trade and its associated public bodies.

== Chairs ==
Committee chairs include those listed below.

| Name | Start | End | Party | Constituency |
|---|---|---|---|---|
| Angus MacNeil | 19 October 2016 | 26 April 2023 | Scottish National Party | Na h-Eileanan an Iar |

== Membership ==
As of February 2023, the members of the committee were as follows:

| Member | Party | Constituency |
|---|---|---|
| Angus MacNeil MP (chair) | Scottish National Party | Na h-Eileanan an Iar |
| Mark Garnier MP | Conservative | Wyre Forest |
| Paul Girvan MP | Democratic Unionist | South Antrim |
| Sir Mark Hendrick MP | Labour | Preston |
| Anthony Mangnall MP | Conservative | Totnes |
| Mark Menzies MP | Conservative | Fylde |
| Lloyd Russell-Moyle MP | Labour Co-op | Brighton Kemptown |
| Martin Vickers MP | Conservative | Cleethorpes |
| Andrew Western MP | Labour | Stretford and Urmston |
| Mick Whitley MP | Labour | Birkenhead |
| Mike Wood MP | Conservative | Dudley South |

=== Changes since 2019 ===
| Date | Outgoing Member & Party | Constituency | → | New Member & Party | Constituency | Source |
|---|---|---|---|---|---|---|
| 8 June 2020 | Gareth Thomas MP (Labour) | Harrow West | → | Taiwo Owatemi MP (Labour) | Coventry North West | Hansard |
| 28 September 2020 | Matt Western MP (Labour) | Warwick and Leamington | → | Lloyd Russell-Moyle MP (Labour) | Brighton Kemptown | Hansard |
| 9 November 2020 | Robert Courts MP (Conservative) | Witney | → | Anthony Mangnall MP (Conservative) | Totnes | Hansard |
| 13 July 2021 | Taiwo Owatemi MP (Labour) | Coventry North West | → | Tony Lloyd MP (Labour) | Rochdale | Hansard |
| 14 December 2021 | Craig Williams MP (Conservative) | Montgomeryshire | → | Mike Wood MP (Conservative) | Dudley South | Hansard |

== 2017-2019 ==
The chair was elected on 12 July 2017, with the members of the committee being announced on 11 September 2017.

| Member | Party | Constituency |
|---|---|---|
| Angus MacNeil MP (chair) | Scottish National Party | Na h-Eileanan an Iar |
| Julia Dockerill MP (Note: Julia Lopez following marriage) | Conservative | Hornchurch and Upminster |
| Nigel Evans MP | Conservative | Ribble Valley |
| Marcus Fysh MP | Conservative | Yeovil |
| Ranil Jayawardena MP | Conservative | North East Hampshire |
| Chris Leslie MP | Labour and Co-op | Nottingham East |
| Emma Little-Pengelly MP | Democratic Unionist Party | Gainsborough |
| Faisal Rashid MP | Labour | Warrington South |
| Keith Vaz MP | Labour | Leicester East |
| Catherine West MP | Labour | Hornsey and Wood Green |
| Matt Western MP | Labour | Warwick and Leamington |

=== Changes 2017-2019 ===
| Date | Outgoing Member & Party | Constituency | → | New Member & Party | Constituency | Source |
|---|---|---|---|---|---|---|
| 4 December 2017 | Keith Vaz MP (Labour) | Leicester East | → | Stephanie Peacock MP (Labour) | Barnsley East | Hansard |
| 2 July 2018 | Stephanie Peacock MP (Labour) | Barnsley East | → | Sir Mark Hendrick MP (Labour) | Preston | Hansard |
| 25 March 2019 | Catherine West MP (Labour) | Hornsey and Wood Green | → | Owen Smith MP (Labour) | Pontypridd | Hansard |
| 8 May 2019 | Chris Leslie MP (Change UK) | Nottingham East | → | Gareth Thomas MP (Labour and Co-op) | Harrow West | Hansard |

== 2016-2017 ==
The chair was elected on 19 October 2016, with members being announced on 31 October 2016.

| Member | Party | Constituency |
|---|---|---|
| Angus MacNeil MP (chair) | Scottish National Party | Na h-Eileanan an Iar |
| Liam Byrne MP | Labour | Birmingham Hodge Hill |
| James Cleverly MP | Conservative | Braintree |
| Nigel Evans MP | Conservative | Ribble Valley |
| Marcus Fysh MP | Conservative | Yeovil |
| Ranil Jayawardena MP | Conservative | North East Hampshire |
| Sir Edward Leigh MP | Conservative | Gainsborough |
| Chris Leslie MP | Labour and Co-op | Nottingham East |
| Shabana Mahmood MP | Labour | Birmingham Ladywood |
| Toby Perkins MP | Labour | Chesterfield |
| Sir Desmond Swayne MP | Conservative | New Forest West |

== Work and publications ==
2019–present
| Report/session details | Witnesses | Government response |
|---|---|---|
| UK Trade Negotiations: Parliamentary scrutiny of free trade agreements (October 2022) | | Third special report |
| UK Trade Negotiations: Agreement with New Zealand (October 2022) | Anne-Marie Trevelyan MP and Matthew Davies (24 November 2021) Richard Price, Stephen Gibson, Dr Jonathan Cave and Tammy Holmes (23 March 2022) Professor Tony Venables and Professor Joe Francois (23 March 2022) Professor Andrew Lang, Lucy Monks, Catherine Brims and Chris Southworth (18 May 2022) David Henig, Tim Hiscock and Jack Semple (18 May 2022) Peter Dawson, Phil Stocker, David Swales and Miles Beale (25 May 2022) Sue Davies, Dr Barbara Allen, Dr Jason Paul Mika and Sir Lockwood Smith (25 May 2022) Professor Lorand Bartels (6 July 2022) Anne-Marie Trevelyan MP and Crawford Falconer (6 July 2022) | Second special report |
| UK Trade Negotiations: Scrutiny of Agreement with Australia (June 2022) UK Trade Negotiations: Agreement with Australia (July 2022) | Richard Rumbelow, Alessandro Marongiu, Sam Lowe and Mr Shanker Singham (9 February 2022) Alan Vallance, Mr John Cooke, Prof Daniel Hodson and Dr Minako Morita-Jaeger (9 February 2022) Sarah Williams, Ruth Bergan and Sir Lockwood Smith (2 March 2022) Rosa Crawford, Dr Silke Trommer, Professor Emily Reid and Victoria Hewson (2 March 2022) Sabina Ciofu, Eunice Lim and Swee Leng Harris (9 March 2022) William Kovacic, Eduardo Pérez Motta, Professor Albert Sanchez-Graells and Anne L. Petterd (9 March 2022) Richard Price, Stephen Gibson, Dr Jonathan Cave and Tammy Holmes (23 March 2022) Professor Tony Venables and Professor Joe Francois (23 March 2022) Professor Lorand Bartels (26 April 2022) Nick von Westenholz, Robert Hodgkins, James Russell, Miles Beale and Gerald Mason (26 April 2022) Anne-Marie Trevelyan MP and Crawford Falconer (29 June 2022) | First special report |
| Inward Foreign Direct Investment (September 2021) | Neil Francis, Professor Riccardo Crescenzi, Emily Kent and Professor Susan Scholefield (26 May 2021) Lawrence Slade, Dr Ashley Thomas Lenihan and Camilla de Coverly Veale (26 May 2021) Nicolai Tangen and Trond Grande (16 June 2021) Diego López, Dr Tim Vlandas and Duncan Bonfield (16 June 2021) Lord Grimstone of Boscobel Kt, Lord Callanan, Ceri Smith, Daniel Gieve and Jacqui Ward (16 June 2021) | Fifth special report |
| UK Export Finance (September 2021) | Jonathan Brenton and Susan Ross (20 January 2021) Chris Walker and Peter Ellingworth (20 January 2021) Jack Semple, Nicholas Wrigley and Ipek Gencsu (28 April 2021) Dr Alistair Clark, Professor Andreas Klasen and Dr Susan Hawley (28 April 2021) Richard Simon-Lewis and Vomic Shah (12 May 2021) Mark Ling, Bhavna Saraf and Ian Tandy (12 May 2021) Dr Kamala Dawar and Adrian Jones (12 May 2021) Graham Stuart MP and Louis Taylor (23 June 2021) | Sixth special report |
| Digital trade and data (June 2021) | Hosuk Lee-Makiyama, Professor Elaine Fahey, Javier Ruiz Diaz and Dr Emily Jones (27 January 2021) Diana Avila, David Holman and Nick Ashton-Hart (27 January 2021) Professor David Collins, Professor Christopher Kuner and Dr Kristina Irion (10 March 2021) Sue Davies, Sabina Ciofu and Jim Killock (10 March 2021) Rt Hon John Whittingdale OBE MP, Rt Hon Greg Hands MP, Graham Floater and Nick Russell (21 April 2021) | Fourth special report |
| UK trade remidies policy (March 2021) | Dr Lorand Bartels and James Kane (14 October 2020) Rosa Crawford, Dr Laura Cohen and Richard Warren (14 October 2020) Simon Walker and Satjit Singh (25 November 2020) Mr Ranil Jayawardena MP and Claire Vince (13 January 2021) | First special report Third special report (TRA's response) |
| UK Freeports (April 2021) | Chris Walker, Alex Stojanovic and Professor Catherine Barnard (15 July 2020) Charles Hammond, Simon Bird and Karen Dee (15 July 2020) Richard Ballantyne, Andrew Carter and Councillor Kevin Bentley (9 September 2020) Dr Anton Moiseienko and Charlotte Morgan (9 September 2020) Chris Starkie, Roger Pollen, Roy MacGregor and Tim Williams (7 October 2020) Aidan McMahon, Ivan McKee MSP and Rebecca Evans MS (7 October 2020) Rt Hon Steve Barclay MP, Luke Hall MP and Rachel Campbell (24 February 2021) | Second special report |
| UK-Japan Comprehensive Economic Partnership Agreement (November 2020) | Dr Anna Jerzewska, Sam Lowe, Lucia Quaglia and Dr Minako Morita-Jaeger (11 November 2020) Mike Hawes, Sabina Ciofu, George Riddell and Nick von Westenholz (11 November 2020) | Second special report |
| The Covid-19 pandemic and international trade (July 2020) | Dr Samuel Roscoe and Dr Richard Torbett (23 April 2020) Peter Ellingworth and Mark Roscrow (23 April 2020) Professor Bob Doherty and Professor Fiona Smith (30 April 2020) Andrew Opie and Ian Wright (30 April 2020) Carlos López-Gómez, Stephen Phipson and Elizabeth De Jong (6 May 2020) Mike Hawes, Philip Law, and Paul Alger (6 May 2020) John Drummond, Vivienne Stern and Miles Celic (13 May 2020) Courtney Fingar, Laura Bannister and Dr James X Zhan (13 May 2020) Soumaya Keynes, Professor Simon J. Evenett and Marianne Petsinger (5 June 2020) Alan Wolff and Peter Ungphakorn (5 June 2020) Rt Hon Elizabeth Truss MP and Andrew Mitchell (24 June 2020) | First special report |

== See also ==
- Parliamentary committees of the United Kingdom
