= Greg Beales =

British unhoused rights advocate and former political adviser

- Born: 1977 (age 48–49)
- Occupation: Political adviser
- Known for: Downing Street adviser to Tony Blair and Gordon Brown

Greg Beales (born 1977) formerly worked as a Downing Street advisor to Prime Ministers Gordon Brown and Tony Blair and as Director of Strategy and Planning for the Labour Party.

== Political career ==
Beales served as Senior Advisor for Health and Social Care issues to the British Prime Minister Gordon Brown after Brown became Prime Minister in 2007.

Initially a Senior Civil Servant, in 2010 Beales was made a political appointment and was listed on the Cabinet Office website as a Policy Advisor assigned to the Downing Street Policy Directorate. In 2010, Beales became Labour Party Director of Policy as the party become the official opposition. Following a reorganisation of the party in 2012, Beales served as the Labour Party's Executive Director, responsible for strategy and the keeper of party polling for Ed Miliband.

Patrick Wintour of The Guardian described Ed Miliband's leadership as an evolution from Stewart Wood's demands for a bodily ideological break from "New Labour" to Beales' apparently more pragmatic approach. Beales was a member of the "quarterly look-ahead" group composed of Senior Miliband advisers who were tasked with the winning the 2015 general election for Labour. Nevertheless, Beales was considered by The Spectator to be a 'second tier adviser' who felt the polling he commissioned was frustratingly under-considered in strategic decision-making. In 2012-2013 Beales was cited in numerous sources as the architect of Labour's focus on living standards and what the party dubbed a "cost of living crisis". In 2013 he was described as "energy personality of the year" after being seen to be responsible for the Labour party's proposals to cap energy bills.

One Labour MP quoted in the spectator described Beales' role; ‘Greg manages the feedback from the focus groups and the polling. And that means he’s actually the guy with the widest interface with the voters. Greg’s always trying to pull Ed’s people back towards that swath of former Labour voters the party lost under Blair. While every-one else is banging on about how to hang on to former Lib Dems, Greg’s popping up and saying, “Fine, but remember that if we want to win, there’s a few blue-collar, small-c conservatives we’re going to need to pull across as well.”’

Geoffrey Robinson, Labour MP for Coventry North West was rumoured to have told party activists he would step down in 2015 to allow Beales to contest his seat; an email seen by the Coventry Telegraph's Simon Gilbert appeared to show Beales and Robinson discussing introductions to prominent members of the local labour party. However Robinson subsequently contested and won Coventry North West.

== Homelessness ==
Beales was the Director of Campaigns, Communications and Policy of the homelessness charity Shelter between September 2017 and November 2020. He took on the post after leaving his position as Senior Director of the multinational advertising agency WPP. In January 2019, he led the publication of the landmark independent Shelter report on the future of social housing and he has led campaigns to challenge discrimination against benefit recipients in the housing sector. He was previously involved in the development of the Living Wage campaign.
