= Coventry South West =

UK Parliament constituency (1974–1997)

- Former borough constituency for the House of Commons
- County: West Midlands

February 1974–1997
- Seats: One
- Created from: Coventry South, Coventry West, Warwick and Leamington
- Replaced by: Coventry South, Coventry North West

Coventry South West was a parliamentary constituency in the city of Coventry. It returned one Member of Parliament (MP) to the House of Commons of the Parliament of the United Kingdom.

The constituency was created for the February 1974 general election, and abolished for the 1997 general election, when it was partially replaced by Coventry South.

== Boundaries ==
1974–1983: The County Borough of Coventry wards of Cheylesmore, Earlsdon, Westwood, Whoberley, and Woodlands.

1983–1997: The City of Coventry wards of Earlsdon, Wainbody, Westwood, Whoberley, and Woodlands.

== Members of Parliament ==
Election	Member	Party	Notes
Feb 1974	Audrey Wise	Labour	Defeated at 1979 general election. Subsequently, MP for Preston 1987-2000
1979	John Butcher	Conservative	Retired at 1997 general election, following boundary changes
1997	constituency abolished: see Coventry South & Coventry North West		

== Elections ==
=== Elections in the 1970s ===
General election February 1974: Coventry South West
Party	Candidate	Votes	%	±%
Labour	Audrey Wise	22,985	40.46	
Conservative	JR Jeffrey	22,472	39.56	
Liberal	NB Chapple	11,348	19.98	
Majority		513	0.90	
Turnout		56,805	84.15	
Labour win (new seat)				

General election October 1974: Coventry South West
Party	Candidate	Votes	%	±%
Labour	Audrey Wise	23,225	43.11	
Conservative	JR Jeffrey	21,107	39.18	
Liberal	NB Chapple	8,579	15.92	
National Front	R Rickard	822	1.53	New
More Prosperous Britain	Tom Keen	144	0.27	New
Majority		2,118	3.93	
Turnout		53,877	79.42	
Labour hold		Swing		

General election 1979: Coventry South West
Party	Candidate	Votes	%	±%
Conservative	John Butcher	27,928	49.27	
Labour	Audrey Wise	22,274	39.30	
Liberal	NB Chapple	5,921	10.45	
National Front	M Williamson	482	0.85	
More Prosperous Britain	Tom Keen	79	0.14	
Majority		5,654	9.97	N/A
Turnout		56,684	81.50	
Conservative gain from Labour		Swing		

=== Elections in the 1980s ===
General election 1983: Coventry South West
Party	Candidate	Votes	%	±%
Conservative	John Butcher	22,223	45.00	
Labour	David Edwards	15,776	31.94	
SDP	Marjorie Lyle	11,174	22.63	N/A
Nationalist Party	M Williamson	214	0.43	New
Majority		6,447	13.06	
Turnout		49,387	75.89	
Conservative hold		Swing		

General election 1987: Coventry South West
Party	Candidate	Votes	%	±%
Conservative	John Butcher	22,318	43.3	−1.7
Labour	Robert Slater	19,108	37.0	+5.1
Liberal	Robert Wheway	10,166	19.70	−2.9
Majority		3,210	6.3	−6.8
Turnout		51,592	78.69	+2.80
Conservative hold		Swing		

=== Elections in the 1990s ===
General election 1992: Coventry South West
Party	Candidate	Votes	%	±%
Conservative	John Butcher	23,225	45.7	+2.4
Labour	Robert Slater	21,789	42.8	+5.8
Liberal Democrats	Geoffrey Sewards	4,666	9.2	−10.5
Liberal	Robert Wheway	989	1.9	New
Natural Law	David S. Morris	204	0.4	New
Majority		1,436	2.9	−3.4
Turnout		50,873	80.1	+1.4
Conservative hold		Swing	−1.7	
