= Coventry North =

Parliamentary constituency in the United Kingdom, 1950–1974

- Former borough constituency for the House of Commons
- County: Warwickshire (West Midlands from 1974)

1950–1974
- Seats: One
- Created from: Coventry East; Coventry West
- Replaced by: Coventry North West; Coventry North East

Coventry North was a parliamentary constituency in the city of Coventry in the West Midlands. It returned one Member of Parliament (MP) to the House of Commons of the Parliament of the United Kingdom, elected by the first past the post system.

== History ==
The constituency was created for the 1950 general election, and abolished for the February 1974 general election.

Throughout its history this constituency provided a reasonably safe seat for Labour backbencher, Maurice Edelman. His majority ranged between 1,241 (2.8%) in the 1959 election to 11,117 (22.2%) in 1950.

== Boundaries ==
The County Borough of Coventry wards of Bablake, Foleshill, Holbrook, Radford, and Sherbourne.

The constituency was one of three divisions of Coventry, a parliamentary borough in the historic county of Warwickshire in the West Midlands region of England.

When Coventry was first divided for parliamentary purposes, in the 1945-50 Parliament, the area that later became this constituency was split between the then two seats of Coventry East and Coventry West.

In 1974 Coventry was split into four new constituencies, and this seat disappeared. Foleshill ward became part of Coventry North East, while the remaining four wards from this seat formed the whole of Coventry North West.

== Members of Parliament ==
Election	Member	Party
1950	Maurice Edelman	Labour
Feb 1974	constituency abolished	

== Elections ==
=== Elections in the 1950s ===
General election 1950: Coventry North
Party	Candidate	Votes	%	±%
Labour	Maurice Edelman	28,924	57.93	
Conservative	John Dalley	17,807	35.67	
Liberal	John Burns	3,195	6.40	
Majority		11,117	22.26	
Turnout		49,926	87.78	
Labour win (new seat)				

General election 1951: Coventry North
Party	Candidate	Votes	%	±%
Labour	Maurice Edelman	29,826	59.58	
Conservative	Harold Sydney Clippingdale	20,238	40.42	
Majority		9,588	19.16	
Turnout		50,064	86.38	
Labour hold		Swing		

General election 1955: Coventry North
Party	Candidate	Votes	%	±%
Labour	Maurice Edelman	24,565	53.45	
Conservative	John Poole	21,608	43.81	
Majority		3,173	9.64	
Turnout		46,173	82.29	
Labour hold		Swing		

General election 1959: Coventry North
Party	Candidate	Votes	%	±%
Labour	Maurice Edelman	23,035	51.38	
Conservative	Francis Charles Maynard	21,794	48.62	
Majority		1,241	2.76	
Turnout		44,829	83.64	
Labour hold		Swing		

=== Elections in the 1960s ===
General election 1964: Coventry North
Party	Candidate	Votes	%	±%
Labour	Maurice Edelman	23,355	52.73	
Conservative	Michael Heseltine	19,825	44.76	
Independent	Ronald Robinson	1,112	2.51	New
Majority		3,530	7.97	
Turnout		44,292	81.42	
Labour hold		Swing		

General election 1966: Coventry North
Party	Candidate	Votes	%	±%
Labour	Maurice Edelman	25,170	59.32	
Conservative	David Henry J Martin-Jones	17,263	40.68	
Majority		7,907	18.64	
Turnout		42,433	78.66	
Labour hold		Swing		

=== Elections in the 1970s ===
General election 1970: Coventry North
Party	Candidate	Votes	%	±%
Labour	Maurice Edelman	24,004	56.68	
Conservative	Frederick Tuckman	18,344	43.32	
Majority		5,660	13.36	
Turnout		42,348	74.57	
Labour hold		Swing		
