= John Butcher (British politician) =

British politician

Parliamentary Under-Secretary of State for Education and Science
- In office 26 July 1988 – 24 July 1989
- Preceded by: Baroness Hooper
- Succeeded by: Alan Howarth

Parliamentary Under-Secretary of State for Trade and Industry
- In office 14 June 1983 – 26 July 1988
- Preceded by: Position established
- Succeeded by: Eric Forth

Parliamentary Under-Secretary of State for Industry
- In office 6 April 1982 – 12 June 1983
- Preceded by: John Wakeham
- Succeeded by: Position abolished

Member of Parliament for Coventry South West
- In office 3 May 1979 – 8 April 1997
- Preceded by: Audrey Wise
- Succeeded by: Constituency abolished

Birmingham City Councillor
- In office 1972–1978

Personal details
- Born: 13 February 1946 Doncaster, England
- Died: 25 December 2006 (aged 60) Lake District, England
- Citizenship: British
- Party: Conservative
- Children: 3, including Jessica
- Education: Huntingdon Grammar School
- Alma mater: University of Birmingham

John Patrick Butcher (13 February 1946 – 25 December 2006) was a Conservative Party politician in the United Kingdom.

Butcher was born in Doncaster but grew up in Huntingdonshire where he was educated at Huntingdon Grammar School and the University of Birmingham. He fought the seat of Birmingham Northfield in February 1974 and was a Birmingham City Councillor from 1972 until 1978.

He was Member of Parliament (MP) for Coventry South West from 1979 until 1997, when the seat was abolished by boundary changes. In business he became chairman of Texas Instruments and the Institute of Directors (1997–2001).

He was married with three children, including Jessica Butcher, and despite living in Solihull was a common sight at the Carlton Club in London.

== Westminster ==
Following his election in 1979, Butcher was appointed PPS to Leon Brittan in 1981 and became a Parliamentary Under-Secretary in 1982 at the Department of Trade. Butcher also served as Parliamentary Under-Secretary for Education and Science between 1988 and 1989, after being moved from what was then called the Department of Trade and Industry.

During his time as minister at the Department of Trade and Industry during the eighties he deregulated the mobile telephone market in the UK.

After he left ministerial office he introduced the Property Misdescriptions Act, which aimed to curb "the more extravagant claims of estate agents". He was also a euro-sceptic and was one of the Maastricht Rebels who voted against the Government in 1993.

== After politics ==
When he left politics due to heart problems, which would eventually take his life, he became chairman of Texas Instruments (1990–98) and the Institute of Directors (1997-2001). In 1997, he became a director of Pertemps Group and two years later became a director of Phoenic Telecom. He ran his own company, John Butcher Associates in the West Midlands.

He died from a heart attack on Christmas Day 2006, while walking in the Lake District with his family.

The initial John Butcher Memorial Lecture was held at University of Warwick on 19 March 2008. The first guest speaker was Michael Howard QC MP.

== Notes ==
Parliament of the United Kingdom
Preceded by Audrey Wise	Member of Parliament for Coventry South West; 1979–1997	Constituency abolished
