= Alice Fenton =

British Business Woman in the Automotive Industry

- Born: 27 March 1909; Blackpool
- Died: 17 March 1960 (aged 50)
- Known for: Motor industry

Alice Fenton (27 March 1909 – 17 March 1960) was the first woman to be a director of Jaguar Cars.

== Early life and family ==
Alice Fenton was born in Blackpool on 27 March 1909 to William and Alice. She also had a sister called Nancy. Fenton's first job was at a music shop, as she was a proficient pianist part of her job was to play the piano in the shop window to attract customers. The music shop was owned by the parents of William Lyons who recommended Fenton when Lyons required more staff at the first premises of the Swallow Sidecar Company, of which Lyons was a co-founder. Fenton had been studying a commercial course, shorthand and typing and was therefore well equipped to join the Swallow Sidecar Company as an Office Junior.

== Career ==
In 1925, Fenton started at the Bloomfield Road site of Swallow Sidecars, staying with the company each time it moved site in Blackpool.

To support sales of the two-seater, Austin Seven Swallow and the Morris Cowley, marketing photos were taken on location at the newly opened attraction Stanley Park, Blackpool. Fenton featured as a model in many of these photos.

With increasing sales, Lyons moved the business to Coventry in 1928 taking 32 of his 50 employees with him, including Fenton. Fenton became Lyons' Personal Assistant at the new plant in the Sales department and had her hair cut short to appear older to match the responsibility of the role. In 1929, Fenton attended her first Motor Show Week in Olympia, London, which she attended every year until 1959.

To begin with, Fenton boarded in a small terrace house with other women who worked at Swallow's after the move to Coventry. Later to mark her 25 years of service she was gifted a cheque to purchase a larger house which would fit a grand piano.

In 1956, Lyons created four new director positions at what was now known as Jaguar after the company had changed names several times. One of these positions was the Home Sales Director, which Fenton took on. This position made Fenton the first woman to become a Director at the company and the most senior woman in the automotive industry in Britain at the time.

== Death and legacy ==
In 1959 at the age of 49, Fenton had been experiencing symptoms which were suspected to be Bell's Palsy and she suspected a minor car incident that autumn may have been to blame. Despite this, Lyons and Fenton had planned for her to attend the 1960 New Year Motor Show in New York City for the launch of the new Mark II compact saloon for the US market. Unfortunately, Fenton died suddenly overnight on the 17th of March ahead of the Motor Show. The cause of death was a cerebral haemorrhage.

Following her death, the road leading to the Jaguar Social Club was named in her honour.

In 2024, as part of International Women's Day, Jaguar Heritage Trust launched an exhibition called "The Women Who Made Their Marque". The exhibition included Fenton in its celebration of women who had contributed to Jaguar and the other marques associated with the brand.
