= Campaign for a More Prosperous Britain =

Defunct political party in the United Kingdom

- Leader: Tom Keen
- Founded: 1974
- Dissolved: c. 1982
- Headquarters: Manchester
- Ideology: Anti-Labour Party; Anti-Trade unionism

The Campaign for a More Prosperous Britain was a political party in the United Kingdom. It was founded before the February 1974 general election by Tom Keen and Harold Smith, both business owners in Manchester.

Keen was the party's leader. Before forming the campaign, he had become a millionaire through property development. The party called for voters not to vote for its candidates, but for tactical voting to defeat the Labour Party; it distributed anti-Labour literature. Despite this, some of its candidacies received hundreds of votes, with Keen's candidacy in Portsmouth North at the October 1974 general election attracting 1.0% of all the votes cast.

The party first came to public attention when members plastered the headquarters of the Trades Union Congress with anti-union posters. It was also strongly opposed to the Communist Party of Great Britain.

Smith stood against Labour Party leader Harold Wilson at the February 1974 general election, taking 234 votes. Keen and Smith set a new record at the October general election by standing simultaneously in eleven and twelve constituencies, respectively. With two associates who stood in a single constituency each, the campaign stood in a total of 25 seats, receiving 4,301 votes. Each constituency was a marginal seat held by the Labour Party, but Labour held each seat at the election.

Keen stood for the party again in the 1979 general election and several by-elections. However, the party was apparently dissolved in the early 1980s, Keen standing in five Labour seats at the 1983 general election as an independent.

== Results ==
=== February 1974 general election ===
Constituency	Candidate	Votes	Percentage	Position	Result
Huyton	Harold Smith	234	0.4	4	Labour hold

=== October 1974 general election ===
Constituency	Candidate	Votes	Percentage	Position	Result
Aldridge-Brownhills	Tom Keen	210	0.4	4	Labour hold
Battersea South	Tom Keen	170	0.6	4	Labour hold
Birmingham Handsworth	Tom Keen	105	0.3	4	Labour hold
Birmingham Perry Barr	Tom Keen	86	0.2	5	Labour hold
Birmingham Yardley	Tom Keen	111	0.2	5	Labour hold
Bolton East	Harold Smith	149	0.3	5	Labour hold
Bradford West	Harold Smith	339	0.8	4	Labour hold
Chorley	Harold Smith	185	0.3	4	Labour hold
Coventry South West	Tom Keen	144	0.3	5	Labour hold
Derby North	Harold Smith	242	0.4	4	Labour hold
Glasgow Govan	T. Clyde	27	0.1	6	Labour hold
Gravesend	Tom Keen	239	0.4	5	Labour hold
Huddersfield West	Harold Smith	136	0.3	5	Labour hold
Ilford South	Tom Keen	169	0.4	4	Labour hold
Keighley	Charles William Deakin	179	0.4	5	Labour hold
Loughborough	Harold Smith	125	0.2	5	Labour hold
Manchester Moss Side	Harold Smith	96	0.3	5	Labour hold
Middleton and Prestwich	Harold Smith	234	0.4	4	Labour hold
Portsmouth North	Tom Keen	527	1.0	4	Labour hold
Preston North	Harold Smith	138	0.3	4	Labour hold
Preston South	Harold Smith	87	0.2	5	Labour hold
Putney	Tom Keen	125	0.3	4	Labour hold
Sowerby	Harold Smith	157	0.4	4	Labour hold
Walsall South	Tom Keen	150	0.4	5	Labour hold
York	Harold Smith	304	0.5	4	Labour hold

=== By-elections, 1974–1979 ===
Election	Candidate	Votes	Percentage	Position	Result
1976 Coventry North West	Tom Keen	40	0.1	6	Labour hold

=== 1979 general election ===
Constituency	Candidate	Votes	Percentage	Position	Result
Bristol North West	Tom Keen	73	0.1	5	Conservative gain
Bristol South East	Tom Keen	66	0.1	5	Labour hold
Colne Valley	Tom Keen	101	0.2	4	Liberal hold
Coventry North West	Tom Keen	98	0.3	4	Labour hold
Coventry South West	Tom Keen	144	0.3	5	Conservative gain
Huddersfield West	Tom Keen	101	0.2	4	Conservative gain

=== By-elections, 1979–1983 ===
Election	Candidate	Votes	Percentage	Position	Result
1981 Warrington	Tom Keen	10	0.0	11	Labour hold
1982 Beaconsfield	Tom Keen	51	0.1	6	Conservative hold

At Beaconsfield, Keen stood under the description "Benn in 10 unless Proportional Representation".
