= Mike McGinnity =

English football executive

Michael McGinnity MBE (11 September 1941 – 9 January 2016) was chairman and life president of Coventry City Football Club.

== Career ==
He held the position of life president at the club following resigning as chairman in 2006 due to ongoing health problems. He was succeeded by Geoffrey Robinson MP and later Ray Ranson, the former footballer turned entrepreneur.

McGinnity became chairman in 2002, replacing Bryan Richardson, after eight years as deputy chairman of the club. McGinnity also has an MBE.

McGinnity purchased a company called Pel in the summer of 1989, creating a new division specialising in plastic seating for football stadia. In January 1990 the Taylor report into the Hillborough disaster recommended all-seater stadia. The success of Pel Stadium Seating was subsequently attributed to having set up in time to benefit from the Taylor report.
