= Blippar =

British technology company

Blippar Group Limited
- Type: Private
- Industry: 3D + AR + eCommerce + AI
- Founded: 2011
- Founders: Ambarish Mitra; Omar Tayeb; Steve Spencer; Jessica Butcher
- Headquarters: London, New York, Melbourne, Dubai, Bangalore
- Area served: Worldwide
- Key people: Phillip Walter - Group CEO
- Products: World's pioneer and patent-holder of Augmented Reality and Spatial Technologies. Global Leader in 3D CPQ with agentic AI connectivity
- Website: www.blippar.com

Blippar is a company based in the UK that specialises in AI and LLM enabled 3D CPQ (configure price quote), augmented reality (AR) content creation and publishing, and agentic AI ecommerce.

Blippar's product offerings include in-house bespoke 3D modelling and AR content creation, with a focus on mobile and WebAR. The company has its main offices in London.

Blippar has created more than 25,000 AR campaigns for partners that include GSK, Porsche, Jaguar Land Rover, PepsiCo, Cadbury, L’Oréal, and Procter & Gamble. Blippar created the world's first AR product launch, delivered in partnership with OnePlus Nord.

== History ==
=== 2011–2018: Founding and Financial History ===
Blippar was founded in 2011 by Ambarish Mitra, Omar Tayeb and Steve Spencer, after a discussion about the possibility of Queen Elizabeth II ‘coming to life’ from a twenty pound note.

At its launch on Android and iOS in August 2011, Blippar teamed up with Cadbury, to invite chocolate fans to play an AR game triggered by its packaging.

From then, Blippar has worked with various brands and campaigns. In 2014 it launched a new platform for Google Glass, enabling developers to create AR games using a person's eyes to control gameplay.

In 2015, Blippar launched an R&D lab to explore “innovative use cases”, not just for AR, but also for virtual reality (VR).

By the time of its $54 million Series D round of funding in early 2016, Blippar had been doubling down on its broader machine learning and AI efforts, with 60 engineers in its San Francisco and Mountain View offices, and 300 employees spread across 14 offices globally.

=== 2019–2026: Restructure ===
Blippar was bought out of administration in early 2019, when it sold its IP assets to an investment firm headed by Nick Candy.

In 2021, Blippar secured a $5 million (approx €3.6 million) funding in a pre-Series A round, co-led by Chroma Ventures, the investment arm of Paddy Burns’ and Chris van der Kuyl's gaming company 4J Studios, and West Coast Capital; the private equity arm of Scottish entrepreneur Sir Tom Hunter and family. Canadian entrepreneur Anthony Lacavera also contributed to the round through his Globalive Capital investment firm.

In August 2020, Blippar's proprietary spatial visual LLM codebase was used to create the technology stack of its carve-out business, GreyParrot AI, which has grown to become a global leader in AI powered waste management.

Candy Ventures Sarl appointed experienced operational tech specialist Phillip Walter in August 2025 to transform the Company into a 3D + AR + AI group after his success assisting the transformation of their portfolio company Deeper Insights, an AI company that was sold to Cisco.

In November 2025, Blippar Group acquired Plattar, an Australian 3D + AR ecommerce company with a large global client list. In February 2026, Blippar Group incorporated an office in Dubai, UAE.

In October 2026, the group launched a revitalised 'Plattar', a specialist 3D product configuration company for the global home furnishings industry.

== Spatial Group Acquisition ==
=== The New Phase ===
On Friday 20th November 2026, Blippar Group Holdings was placed into administration. It's IP, business units, and Australian subsidiary were immediately acquired by Spatial Group Holdings. Spatial Group is an AI Innovation company with deep experience in spatial technology. Spatial Group builds and operates a growing portfolio of AI companies, each one an agentic ecosystem for the industry it serves. Blippar's IP has been incorporated into Spatial Intellect Limited, a wholly owned subsidiary of Spatial Group. All Blippar employees have transferred into a different Spatial Group subsidiary.

On Sunday 22nd November 2026, Phillip Walter announced that with this new holding company in place, the restructure of the Company into a specialist 3D+AR+AI adtech portfolio business was complete. Two further portfolio companies are expected to launch by the end of 2026.

== Recognition ==
Blippar has been ranked in CNBC’s global ‘Top-50 Disruptors’ list, as well as being listed as a 'Top -20 Business Innovator' by Bloomberg, and 'Most Innovative AR Company' by Fast Company in 2018. Blippar has won awards including best AR app at Mobile World Congress in 2017. The company was also shortlisted for the Most Effective Use of VR and AR at The Drum Awards for Digital Industries in 2020 for its work with OnePlus.
