= Marge Carey =

British trade unionist

Margery Carey, MBE (14 October 1938 – 23 January 2012) was a British trade unionist and served as President of the Union of Shop, Distributive and Allied Workers (USDAW) from 1997 to 2006.

== Early life ==
Carey was born in Middlesbrough, although her family soon moved to Liverpool.

Carey joined the USDAW in 1972, whilst working at Vernons Pools, and was appointed as an area organiser in 1978. She was promoted to Divisional Officer for the union's North West region in February 1990 and continued in that position until she retired in 2001. She was elected President of the USDAW from 1997 until 2006.

She also served as a member of the General Council of the Trades Union Congress from 1998 until 2006 and was awarded an MBE in 1998 "for services to industrial relations".

After retiring, Carey was diagnosed with motor neurone disease and became active in the Merseyside branch of the Motor Neurone Disease Association, serving as a branch committee member. She died of motor neurone disease on 23 January 2012, aged 73.

Political offices
Preceded by Audrey Wise	President of USDAW; 1997–2006	Succeeded by Jeff Broome
