= Audrey Wise =

British politician (1932–2000)

Member of Parliament for Preston
- In office 11 June 1987 – 2 September 2000
- Preceded by: Stan Thorne
- Succeeded by: Mark Hendrick

Member of Parliament for Coventry South West
- In office 28 February 1974 – 7 April 1979
- Preceded by: Constituency created
- Succeeded by: John Butcher

Personal details
- Born: Audrey Brown; 4 January 1932 Newcastle upon Tyne, England
- Died: 2 September 2000 (aged 68) Stafford, England
- Party: Labour
- Spouse: John Wise (m. 1953)
- Children: 2 (including Valerie)

Audrey Wise (née Brown; 4 January 1932 (Note: Wise gave her age as thirty-nine when nominated for the Coventry parliamentary seat, though she had just turned forty-two when she was elected in February 1974. Her date of birth was routinely reported as 1935 after this date, which often caused her "enormous difficulty" when asked in later years.) – 2 September 2000) was a British Labour politician who was the Member of Parliament for Coventry South West from 1974 to 1979, and for Preston from 1987 until her death.

== Early life ==
Audrey Wise was born Audrey Brown in Newcastle upon Tyne, the daughter of a former Labour councillor. She married her husband John, a dispensing optician, in 1953, and they had two children: Valerie, who is also a political activist, and a son, Ian.

== Political career ==
At the age of 21 she became a Tottenham borough councillor. She served as MP for Coventry South West from February 1974 to 1979, a period of tenuous Labour Government with marginal or no majorities. Despite Labour being in power, "at Westminster in the 1970s she was regarded as something of a left-wing nuisance, a state of affairs that she viewed as necessary and desirable." During the 1970s she was a leading member of the Institute for Workers' Control.

She visited Portugal in 1974 to report on and participate in the Carnation Revolution that overthrew the fascist dictatorship, recording her experiences and analysis in Eyewitness in Revolutionary Portugal. She was famously arrested on the picket line during the Grunwick dispute where Asian women workers were striking for union recognition.

With Jeff Rooker, she co-authored the Rooker-Wise Amendment to Denis Healey's 1977 budget which sought to freeze many annual fiscal changes to mitigate global inflation; this amendment introduced retrospective inflation-proofing on personal tax allowances (the tax-free portion of individuals' earnings), and resulted in £450 million being returned to taxpayers.

Losing her seat in the 1979 general election, she stood unsuccessfully in Woolwich in 1983. She was then elected as MP for Preston in 1987, which she held until her death in 2000. Wise was a member of the left-wing Campaign Group of Labour MPs. She was president of the shop staff union USDAW between 1991 and 1997.

As a member of the health select committee, she persuaded the committee to hold an inquiry into maternity services. The report, endorsed by the Conservative government, called for services to become more woman-centred, and recommended increased access to home births and water births.

The conflict between Wise and the Labour Whips was highlighted in the National Theatre play This House by James Graham in 2012.

== Death ==
On 2 September 2000, Wise died at her home in Stafford from a brain tumour, which had been diagnosed some five months earlier. Her family described her death as "one fight she did not win".

== Notes ==
Parliament of the United Kingdom
New constituency	Member of Parliament for Coventry South West; February 1974–1979	Succeeded by John Butcher
Preceded by Stan Thorne	Member of Parliament for Preston; 1987–2000	Succeeded by Mark Hendrick
Political offices
Preceded by Sydney Tierney	President of USDAW; 1991–1997	Succeeded by Marge Carey
