= Maurice Edelman =

British politician (1911–1975)

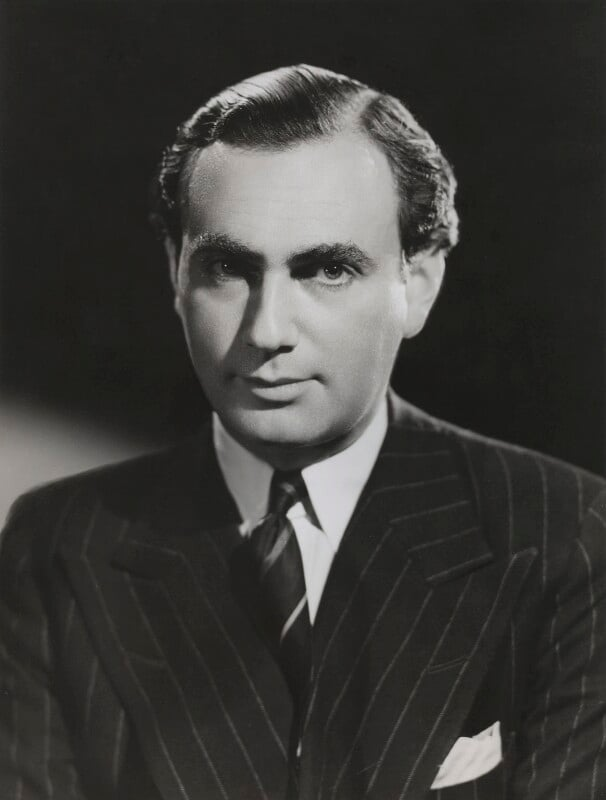
- Edelman in 1947

Member of Parliament for Coventry North West
- In office 28 February 1974 – 14 December 1975
- Preceded by: Constituency established
- Succeeded by: Geoffrey Robinson

Member of Parliament for Coventry North
- In office 23 February 1950 – 8 February 1974
- Preceded by: Constituency established
- Succeeded by: Constituency abolished

Member of Parliament for Coventry West
- In office 5 July 1945 – 3 February 1950
- Preceded by: Constituency established
- Succeeded by: Constituency abolished

Personal details
- Born: Israel Maurice Edelman; 2 March 1911 Cardiff, Wales
- Died: 14 December 1975 (aged 64) London, England
- Party: Labour
- Spouse: Matilda Yeager (m. 1933)
- Children: 2
- Education: Trinity College, Cambridge
- Profession: Author

Israel Maurice Edelman (2 March 1911 – 14 December 1975) was a British Labour Party politician, journalist, and novelist from Wales who represented Coventry constituencies in the House of Commons for over 30 years, from 1945 until his death.

== Early life ==
Maurice Edelman was born to a Jewish family in Cardiff in 1911. His parents had come to Wales seven years earlier, escaping the pogroms in Tsarist Russia. His father was a photographer. He was educated at Cardiff High School and Trinity College, Cambridge, where he was an Exhibitioner in Modern Languages (French, German and later Russian). He joined the plywood industry in 1931 as a company director, and at the outbreak of World War II was engaged in research into the application of plywood and plastic materials to aircraft construction. In 1933, he married Matilda "Tilli" Yeager, and they had two daughters.

== Writing career ==
Edelman was a prolific journalist and author of several works of fiction and non-fiction. During the Second World War, he was a correspondent for Picture Post. His non-fiction works include France: The Birth of the Fourth Republic, and a biography of David Ben Gurion. He also produced screenplays for television broadcasts during the 1960s and 1970s. His novels include A Trial of Love (1951), Who Goes Home? (1953), A Dream of Treason (1954), The Happy Ones (1957), A Call on Kuprim (1959), The Minister (1961), The Fratricides (1963), The Prime Minister's Daughter (1964), All on a Summer's Night (1969), Disraeli In Love (1972) and Disraeli Rising (1975).

C.P. Snow credited Edelman as helping him research his 1964 political novel Corridors of Power.

== Political career ==
At the 1945 election Edelman was elected as Member of Parliament (MP) for Coventry West. In 1950 he won the new seat of Coventry North.

He was a vice-chairman of the British Council and chairman of the Franco-British Parliamentary Relations Committee. Staunchly Pro-European, he was a founding member of the Council of Europe in 1949. A lifelong Francophile, Edelman was appointed Officier de la Légion d'Honneur in 1960, having previously been awarded Chevalier de la Légion d'Honneur in 1954. He was also president of the Anglo-Jewish Association, and an active member of the Friends of the Hebrew University.

He appeared on the live television panel show What's My Line? from New York on 29 April 1962.

Following further boundary changes in 1974, Edelman represented Coventry North West until his death, from an embolism, at Royal Brompton Hospital on 14 December 1975. His successor was Geoffrey Robinson, who won a by-election on 4 March 1976.

Parliament of the United Kingdom
Constituency established	Member of Parliament for Coventry West; 1945 – 1950	Constituency abolished
Constituency established	Member of Parliament for Coventry North; 1950 – February 1974	Constituency abolished
Constituency established	Member of Parliament for Coventry North West; February 1974 – 1975	Succeeded by Geoffrey Robinson
