= Jim Powell (British novelist) =

British novelist (1949–2023)

Jim Powell (17 May 1949 – 20 May 2023) was a British novelist, and a direct descendant of the 19th-century novelist Thomas Love Peacock. Powell also had careers in advertising and pottery, and was a political activist.

== Early life and education ==
Born in London, Jim Powell was educated at Charterhouse School and Trinity Hall, Cambridge, where he took a master's degree in history.

== Novelist ==
Powell's first novel, The Breaking of Eggs, was published in 2010. It deals with the impact of fascism and communism on 20th-century Europe. The novel was longlisted for the Desmond Elliott Prize for first novels. It was reviewed in The New Zealand Herald. Powell's second novel, Trading Futures, was published in 2016, and his third novel, Things We Nearly Knew, in 2018.

== Other activities ==
In 1971, after Cambridge, Powell found employment at Wasey, Campbell-Ewald, an advertising agency in London. He went on to become managing director of Michael Bungay DFS, another agency.

Powell was a co-founder of Holdenby Designs, a business designing and producing pottery.

At the 1987 general election, Powell stood as the Conservative Party candidate in Coventry North West, but lost to the incumbent Labour MP Geoffrey Robinson. He was a friend of senior politician Francis Pym whom he assisted with (Pym's) 1985 book The Politics of Consent.

== Death ==
Jim Powell died of emphysema on 20 May 2023, at the age of 74.
