= Taiwo Owatemi =

British politician (born 1992)

Taiwo Owatemi MP
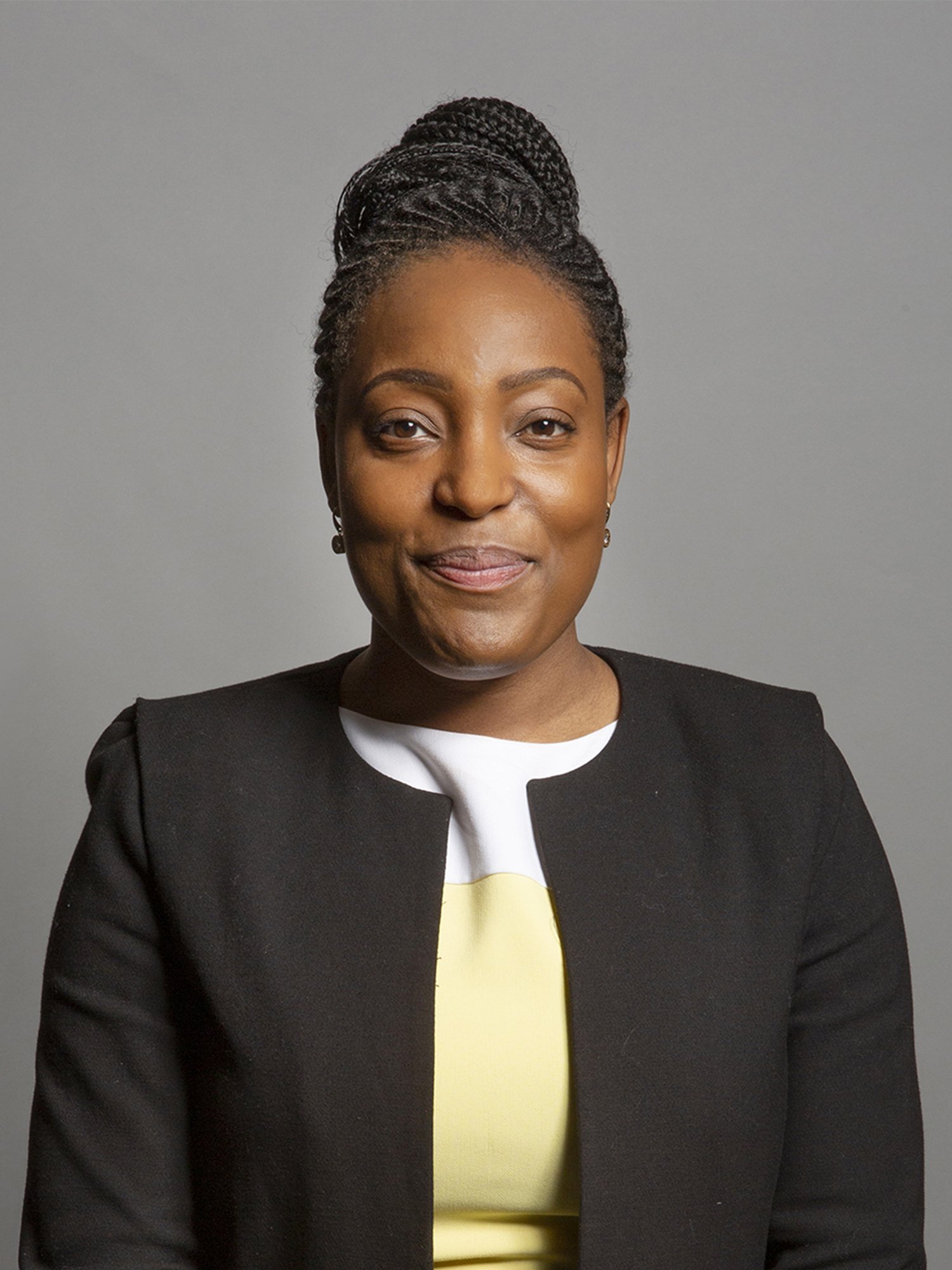
- Official portrait, 2019

Lord Commissioner of the Treasury
- In office 10 July 2024 – 22 July 2026
- Prime Minister: Keir Starmer

Shadow Minister for Women and Equalities
- In office 21 September 2021 – 7 September 2022
- Leader: Keir Starmer
- Preceded by: Charlotte Nichols
- Succeeded by: Yasmin Qureshi

Member of Parliament for Coventry North West
- Incumbent
- Assumed office 12 December 2019
- Preceded by: Geoffrey Robinson
- Majority: 11,174 (26.6%)

Personal details
- Born: 22 July 1992 (age 34)
- Party: Labour
- Children: 1
- Education: University of Kent
- Website: taiwoowatemi.co.uk

Taiwo Victoria Owatemi (born 22 July 1992) is a British politician who has been Member of Parliament (MP) for Coventry North West since 2019. A member of the Labour Party, she currently serves as a Lord Commissioner of the Treasury.

== Early and education ==
Owatemi grew up in Plumstead, with close links to an extended family via her aunt and cousins in Coventry. Her father died when she was seven. She was brought up with her twin and her elder brother by her mother, a nurse. She attended Conway Primary School in Plumstead and subsequently attended The Business Academy Bexley (now Harris Garrard Academy).

Owatemi holds an integrated Master's degree in Pharmacy from Medway School of Pharmacy, the University of Kent, and is qualified as a pharmacist.

== Early career ==
Whilst at school, Owatemi was selected for a parliamentary internship by the Social Mobility Foundation and gained experience working in the Westminster office of Conservative MP Oliver Letwin.

She then qualified as a Pharmacist at St Richard's Hospital, Chichester. She is a registered Pharmacist with the General Pharmaceutical Council. She worked as a oncology pharmacist at a cancer unit in Dartford and Gravesham NHS Trust before she entered Parliament.

From 2016 onwards, Owatemi served in a number of roles in the Young Fabians and published writing on health policy. She joined the Labour Party after becoming interested in health inequalities and health policy during her training year at St Richard's Hospital.

== Political career ==
She was selected as Labour's candidate for Coventry North West at the 2019 general election after the incumbent Labour MP, Geoffrey Robinson, announced his intention to stand down. Owatemi narrowly held the seat for Labour with a majority of 208 votes. She was one of three female MPs elected from Coventry in 2019, the others being Zarah Sultana and Colleen Fletcher.

After the financial collapse of the Coventry City of Culture Trust, set up to run legacy projects following Coventry's year as UK City of Culture in 2021, she raised an adjournment debate in the House of Commons.

In the 2020 Labour Party leadership election Owatemi nominated Lisa Nandy.

Owatemi served as Parliamentary Private Secretary (PPS) to the Shadow Home Secretary, Nick Thomas-Symonds, from April 2020 to September 2021. She was appointed as Shadow Minister for Women and Equalities in September 2021. She resigned from this position on 7 September 2022 to focus on local constituents. In July 2024, she was appointed to Labour's front bench as Government Whip, Lord Commissioner of HM Treasury.

Owatemi is a member of Labour Friends of Israel and was part of a delegation to the country in February 2023.

Owatemi sat on the Health and Social Care Select Committee between March 2020 and May 2024. She also sat on the International Trade Select Committee from June 2020 to July 2021, and the Petitions Committee from April 2021 to March 2022. Owatemi was the Chair / Co-Chair of the APPG on Pharmacy, the APPG on Child Criminal Exploitation and Knife Crime, and the APPG on Alternative Investment Management.

Owatemi was a governor of a local primary school from 2016. From 2021 onwards, she also held unpaid roles as a Trustee of multiple charities and non-public organisations before resigning in 2024 having been appointed as a Government Whip. These included being on the boards of the Albany Theatre Trust, the Holocaust Memorial Day Trust, and the Commonwealth Parliamentary Association. After being appointed was a Government Whip, Owatemi also stepped down from her role as an Executive Committee Member of the Fabian Society, and as a Strategic Adviser on Cancer Prevention Trials at King's College Hospital.

Owatemi has a cockapoo called Bella, and in March 2025 it was reported that Owatemi had made an expenses claim in summer 2024 to cover a £900 surcharge imposed by the landlord of the flat she rents in London to permit her to keep a dog in the property. This was criticised by fellow Labour MP Dan Jarvis, who said that Owatemi had followed the rules but that the government would make representations to the Independent Parliamentary Standards Authority "to ask them to look very carefully at the detail of this particular rule." In the United Kingdom, MPs can claim expenses under the heading of "Personal Additional Accommodation Expenditure" "for the additional expenses necessarily incurred in staying overnight away from their main home for the purpose of performing their parliamentary duties", including the cost of rent, mortgage interest and subsistence, meaning that expenses can be claimed for overnight stays in London if an MP represents a non-London constituency and their main home is in their own constituency.

Owatemi is a member of trade union GMB.

== Personal life ==
Owatemi is married and in December 2023, she announced the birth of her first child, a daughter.

Parliament of the United Kingdom
Preceded by Geoffrey Robinson	Member of Parliament for Coventry North West; 2019 – present	Incumbent
