= Anthony Mangnall =

British politician (born 1989)

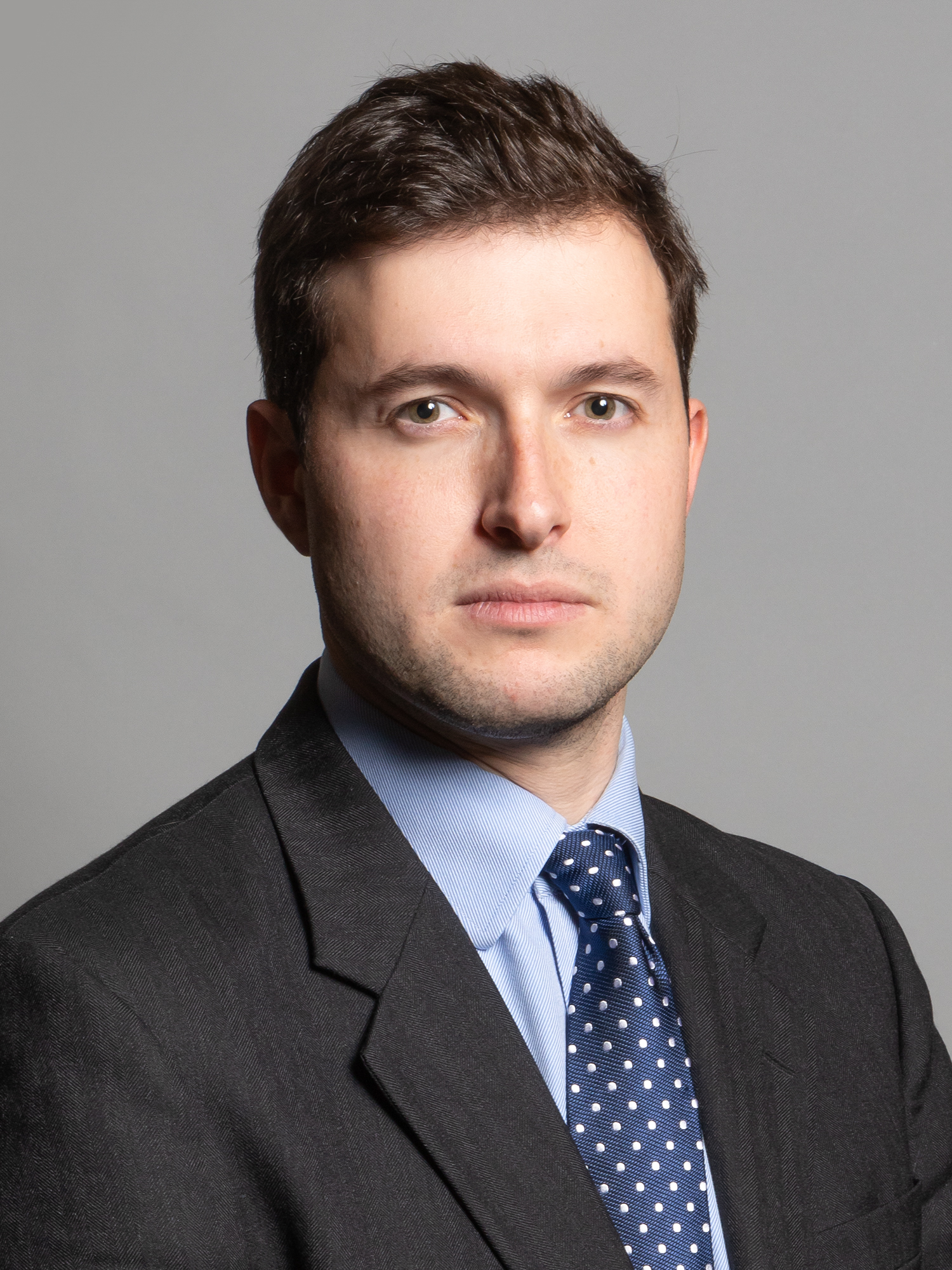
- Mangnall in 2020

Member of Parliament for Totnes
- In office 12 December 2019 – 30 May 2024
- Preceded by: Sarah Wollaston
- Succeeded by: Caroline Voaden (South Devon (Note: The Totnes constituency was renamed "South Devon" at the 2024 general election, with minor boundary changes.))

Personal details
- Born: 12 August 1989 (age 37) London, England
- Party: Conservative
- Education: University of Exeter

Anthony James Holland Mangnall (born 12 August 1989), is a British Conservative Party politician, who served as the Member of Parliament (MP) for Totnes from 2019 to 2024. After minor boundary changes, Mangnall stood again for the seat, now named South Devon, in 2024, and become the first Conservative to lose the seat since 1923 due to the fact that a South Devon Primary was run whereby the Labour Party, Green Party united to support the Liberal Democrats.

Mangnall worked in London and Singapore as a shipbroker before entering politics as a Special Adviser on foreign affairs. He now works in the coffee and cocoa markets in the city of London.

== Early life and education ==
The youngest son of Colonel Nicholas Mangnall OBE and Carola née Sayers, he was brought up in Zimbabwe then Northern Ireland. After attending Shrewsbury School in Shropshire, he read history, politics, and sociology at the University of Exeter, graduating as BA.

== Early career ==
Mangnall served an undergraduate internship as a parliamentary researcher for William Hague, then after graduating he embarked upon a career in shipbroking.

Joining Braemar ACM's Singapore office in 2012, Mangnall trained as a shipbroker chartering small tankers. In 2014 he returned to London with Poten & Partners establishing himself in the West Africa small tankers market, thus gaining experience in evaluating national fuel security levels.

Appointed Private Secretary to William Hague in 2016, Mangnall then managed Lord Hague's private and public interests including working on the closure of the UK's domestic trade of ivory. A passionate conservationist, he also helped to establish a Transport Taskforce directed at eradicating the movement of illegally poached goods.

== Parliamentary career ==
At the 2017 general election Mangnall contested the traditionally safe Labour seat of Warley, where although unsuccessful he did achieve the biggest swing to the Tories. Prior to his selection on 20 July 2019 as the Conservative PPC for Totnes, he was working as a Special Adviser to then Secretary of State for Wales, Alun Cairns. At the 2019 general election Magnall was returned to parliament as Conservative MP for Totnes with a majority of 12,724. He defeated the incumbent Dr Sarah Wollaston who had defected from the Conservatives in February crossing the floor to sit as a Change UK MP, before standing at the general election as a Liberal Democrat candidate.

After his election to Parliament in 2019 Mangnall was a regular contributor in debates on Bills regarding fishing, farming, international trade, development, foreign policy and defence. He briefly served as a Member of the Regulatory Reform Committee between March 2020 and May 2021, then the Procedures Committee between March 2020 to July 2020, before joining the International Trade Select Committee in November 2020. The Department for International Trade (DIT) and the Department for Business, Energy and Industrial Strategy (BEIS) merged to form the Department for Business and Trade, Mangnall joined the Business and Trade Committee.

Mangnall voted against the Government in 10 votes out of 889, 1.1% of his votes. He was the first of the 2019 Conservative intake to defy the Government Whip during the Telecommunications Bill which proposed that Huawei provide the UK's telecommunication infrastructure network. The Government then reversed its position after this vote and blocked Huawei from building the UK's 5G network. Mangnall was a vocal opponent of the cut to Foreign Aid believing the UK's role in international development to be globally leading and in the national interest. Despite failing to win this vote on Foreign Aid, the then-Chancellor Rishi Sunak MP agreed to return the Foreign Aid budget to 0.7% when the independent Office for Budget Responsibility's fiscal forecast stated that, on a sustainable basis, the UK is not borrowing to finance day-to-day spending and underlying debt is falling.

During the COVID-19 pandemic Mangnall persistently rebelled on COVID measures and opposed the second and third national lockdowns. He also advocated against NHS staff being forced to have vaccinations and the mandate extending the wearing of face-coverings to most indoor settings. Mangnall stated in Parliament that "no government should ever use fear as a tool to try and persuade its citizens", and that the UK needs to "build up its resilience and reduce its restrictions."

On the International Trade Committee Mangnall was a vocal contributor about the need for Parliament to have greater scrutiny over UK trade deals. He gained cross-party support in the House of Commons for all new free trade deals to be given significant debating time before a vote. Despite having supported UK's departure from the European Union, Mangnall has claimed to be a strong proponent of free trade and in 2020 he co-authored a paper with right-wing think tank Policy Exchange on the benefits of UK membership of the Comprehensive and Progressive Agreement for Trans-Pacific Partnership.

In February 2022 Mangnall declared that he had submitted a letter of no confidence in the then-Prime Minister, Boris Johnson MP, to the 1922 Committee. He tweeted that "standards in public life matter", concluding that Boris Johnson's behaviour had fallen short of the mark expected by the British public. Mangnall gave one interview to the Daily Telegraph journalist Chris Hope outlining his reasons.

Mangnall was Chairman of the All-Party Parliamentary Group (APPG) for Action on Conflict and Global Britain, Vice-Chairman of the APPG on Photonics and Quantum and of the APPG on Shellfish Aquaculture, and a member of the APPG on Ukraine. He was formerly the Chairman of the APPG for the UK's Preventing Sexual Violence in Conflict Initiative. He also co-chaired the Conservative Friends of International Development. In 2020 he co-authored a paper for the One Nation Conservatives exploring how to spend Aid more effectively. Mangnall is also an Ambassador for the HALO Trust.

In 2020, Mangnall introduced a Private Member's Bill to the Commons called the "Recall of MPs (Change of Party Affiliation) Bill" intending to create a recall process should a Member of Parliament voluntarily change party affiliation without mandate from the electorate. The bill did not progress beyond its second reading in the Commons.

== Post-parliamentary career ==
Prior to the 2024 UK General Election, the Liberal Democrats, Green Party and Labour Party formed an alliance called the South Devon Primary with the aim of unseating Mangall through tactical voting, leading to a victory for the Liberal Democrat candidate Caroline Voaden. Since leaving parliament, Mangall has worked as a Director of Business and Strategy at ICE Benchmark Administration.

== Family ==
On 12 May 2023, Mangnall married Harriet, only daughter of Paul Cherry, of Hertfordshire, and Caroline née Nall-Cain, the Hon. David Nall-Cain, and Lady Katherine Palmer, sister of the 4th Earl of Selborne GBE DL FRS.

Scion of a Cheshire gentry family formerly seated at Christleton Grange, his father, Colonel Nicholas Mangnall OBE, whose maternal grandfather was Colonel Jack Holland DSO MC, of Holland & Holland "fame", served in the Royal Green Jackets. His aunt, Caroline née Mangnall (Lady Bunbury) is married to Sir Michael Bunbury Bt KCVO, having by him two sons and a daughter. Richmal Mangnall was a collateral ancestor and Ernest Mangnall (the only person to have been manager of both Manchester United and Manchester City association football teams) a kinsman.

== Notes ==
Parliament of the United Kingdom
Preceded by Sarah Wollaston	Member of Parliament for Totnes; 2019–2024	Succeeded by Caroline Voaden
