= Jessica Butcher =

British human rights commissioner

Jessica Butcher MBE
- Occupation: Equality and Human Rights Commission (EHRC) commissioner
- Years active: November 2020–present

Jessica Butcher MBE is the co-founder of Blippar and social media video platform Tick. In 2012, she was listed as Fortune's "10 Most Powerful Women Entrepreneurs", and one of the BBC's 100 Women in 2014. She was one of four new Equality and Human Rights Commission (EHRC) board commissioners appointed in November 2020. She is the daughter of late Conservative MP for Coventry South West, John Butcher.

== Views on feminism and gender pay gap ==
Butcher has described herself as an "old-school feminist" who is critical of modern feminism. In a TEDx talk in 2018 called "Is modern feminism starting to undermine itself?" Butcher said: "Feminism, like other forms of identity politics, has become obsessed with female victimhood. Whereas it once used to be about the portrayal of women as mature, equal partners in society, it now seems more to be about girl power – and yet it disempowers, assumes that we're weak and defenceless, like children." She added: "Working-class girls have been deprived of jobs that they love such as Page 3 girls and [Formula One] grid girls because other women disapprove of them. What happened to 'my body, my choice'?"

She has argued that feminists have a victim mentality and seek to find discrimination where none exists, and that where gender discrimination "the most productive reaction to [gender discrimination] is not wounded insecurity ... [but to] take the onus to circumvent the situation in some way", adding: "It should be about resilience, and I feel that the narrative of discrimination and victimhood undermines both that confidence and that resilience and also the individual onus to take ownership of how you put yourself forward, and to mould yourself, change yourself to the circumstances as required."

She also criticised the MeToo movement, arguing that ruined the careers of men indiscriminately; "some possibly justly, but without any due process, no innocence until proven guilty".

Butcher is a critic of narratives around the gender pay gap; in a 2018 CityAM article she wrote that "these disparities are hugely affected by a potential positive: female choice". In her TEDx talk, she said "the pay gap is negligible". This was criticised by Sian Elliott, policy officer at the Trades Union Congress, who said: "Women's choices are constrained when it comes to work because of the unequal division of care between men and women, and that women have very little choice but to go into part-time work because of the lack of flexible quality jobs, and a lack of affordable flexible childcare. ... It is a necessity that many women have to go into part-time work because they need to be able to balance work and care."

== EHRC role ==
She is currently one of four Equality and Human Rights Commission (EHRC) board commissioners appointed by Liz Truss, Minister for Women and Equalities, whose job it is to enforce the Equality Act 2010, and in doing so reduce inequalities, prejudice and discrimination. The EHRC periodically intervenes in legal action against discrimination, including a case where a job offer was withdrawn because the woman was pregnant. Butcher's views on feminism and the gender pay gap have been criticised as incompatible with her EHRC role; the pay gap is a major focus for the EHRC, which takes legal action against employers that fail to report gender pay gaps for their workforces. Her appointment was criticised by Sam Smethers, (then) chief executive of the Fawcett Society, and British historian Kate Williams. However, figures such as fathers' rights group Fathers4Justice and Brexit activist Darren Grimes have supported her appointment to the role.
