= Geoffrey Robinson (politician) =

British politician (born 1938)

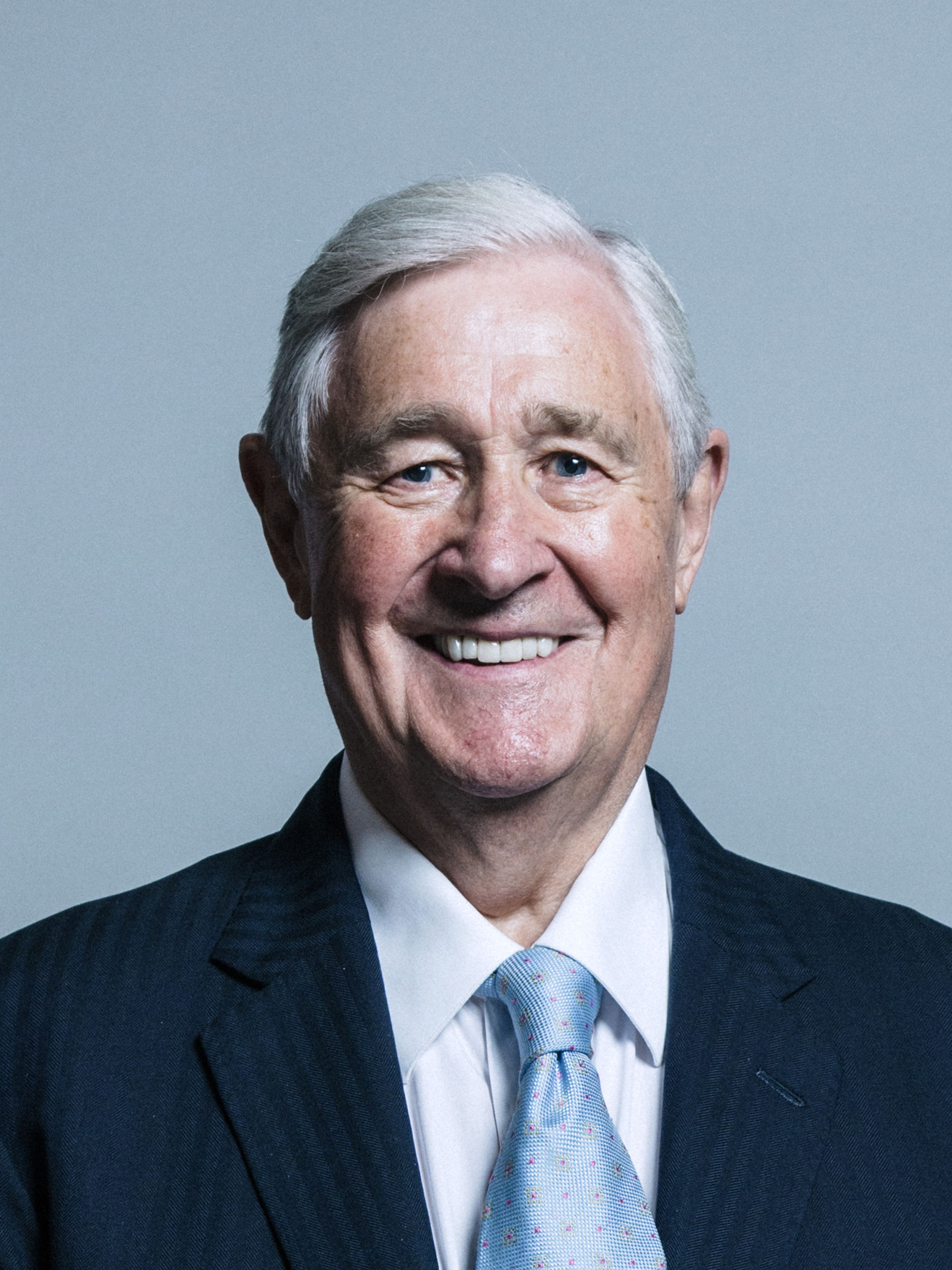
- Official portrait, 2017

Paymaster General
- In office 2 May 1997 – 23 December 1998
- Prime Minister: Tony Blair
- Preceded by: Michael Bates
- Succeeded by: Dawn Primarolo

Member of Parliament for Coventry North West
- In office 4 March 1976 – 6 November 2019
- Preceded by: Maurice Edelman
- Succeeded by: Taiwo Owatemi

Personal details
- Born: 25 May 1938 (age 88) Sheffield, West Riding of Yorkshire, England
- Party: Labour
- Spouse: Marie Elena Giorgio
- Children: 2
- Education: Clare College, Cambridge; Yale University

Geoffrey Robinson (born 25 May 1938) is a British Labour Party politician who was the Member of Parliament (MP) for Coventry North West for 43 years, from 1976 to 2019. He was Paymaster General from May 1997 to December 1998, resigning after the insolvency of his company Trans Tec. It was revealed that he had lent his government colleague Peter Mandelson £373,000 to buy a house. From 1996 to 2008 he was the owner of the New Statesman, a centre-left weekly political magazine.

== Background ==
Robinson was born in Sheffield, England, and educated at Emanuel School in Battersea, London, Clare College, Cambridge, and Yale University. On completing his formal education he became a Labour Party researcher before joining the newly created entity the Industrial Reorganisation Corporation, at a time when the British government was promoting a merger between the Leyland Motor Corporation and BMC. The merger duly took place amid high hopes that a solution to the BMC problem was in sight.

== Business career ==
A change of government led to a swift demise for the Industrial Reorganisation Corporation, and in 1970 Robinson joined British Leyland, the company in the creation of which he had been instrumental. His initial job title was "Staff executive, facilities planning", but after four months he was promoted to the position of Financial Controller. It was an unusual appointment in a conservative industry, both on account of his relative youth and because he had no accountancy qualification. (His formal tertiary education had concentrated on Russian, German and, possibly of more direct relevance, Economics.)

Geoffrey Robinson was from 1972 Chairman of Innocenti in Italy, appointed following acquisition of the business by British Leyland, Robinson having played a leading role in acquisition negotiations following the death of Ferdinando Innocenti.

At around that time he accepted an invitation from Jack Butterworth, Baron Butterworth to join the board of Midland Community Radio, the consortium which successfully bid for the Independent Local Radio franchise for Coventry and Warwickshire. The radio station launched as Mercia Sound in 1980.

Late in 1973, he succeeded Lofty England as Chairman of Jaguar Cars, also at that time under British Leyland ownership. He resigned in 1975 because he could not agree with the Ryder plan to integrate the many different makes under BLMC.

After the Triumph Motorcycles workers locked out their new owners, NVT, from their Meriden plant in 1973, Robinson was instrumental in setting up the subsequent Meriden Triumph workers' co-operative with a substantial Wilson Labour government loan from the minister for trade, Tony Benn. He served as an executive director in what was the last volume manufacturer of motorcycles in the United Kingdom. He occupied a similar non-executive role in the subsequent Triumph Motorcycles (Meriden) Ltd that the co-operative became when he helped negotiate away its debt with the new Conservative Thatcher government in 1981, although he left before the firm eventually closed in 1983.

In 1986, he founded technology company TransTec, which became a £200 million international conglomerate focusing on aerospace customers. In 1996, he acquired the centre-left New Statesman magazine for £375,000. In April 2008 he sold 50% of the business to Mike Danson, and the remainder a year later.

== Political career ==
Robinson became the MP for Coventry North West, a safe Labour Party seat, in a by-election on 4 March 1976 caused by the death of MP Maurice Edelman. His Conservative opponent in the 1987 election was the novelist Jim Powell. During the 1980s, with Labour in opposition, he held frontbench positions, speaking for the party on trade and industry and on science. He was Paymaster General in Tony Blair's government from May 1997 to December 1998, resigning after it was revealed that in 1996 he had lent his government colleague Peter Mandelson £373,000 to buy a house.

Robinson's previous life as a businessman made him one of the wealthiest members of parliament, with a personal fortune of around £30 million. He is a lover of fine wine and dining. He owns holiday homes in Tuscany (used once by Tony Blair for his summer holiday) and the South of France, and owns a penthouse flat in London's Park Lane. He bought the house Orchards in Godalming, Surrey (designed and built by Edwin Lutyens between 1897 and 1899) which has been described as 'among the finest Surrey Houses'. He also bought and restored Lutyens' Marshcourt (Stockbridge, Hampshire, 1901–1904) but sold it again in 1999 after resigning as Paymaster General. In November 1997 it was revealed by Chris Blackhurst in an article for the Independent on Sunday that Robinson had been a discretionary beneficiary of a £12.75 million offshore trust for him and his family established by Joska Bourgeois, called Orion, based in the tax haven of Guernsey. In 2000 the trust was reportedly worth £38 million.

In 2000 Robinson published a memoir of his time in the Blair government, The Unconventional Minister: My Life Inside New Labour. Robinson was the subject of Tom Bower's 2001 book The Paymaster. As a result of the book's revelation that Robinson had failed to register the receipt of £200,000 from Robert Maxwell, he was suspended for three weeks from the House of Commons in October 2001.

The Coventry Telegraph’s Simon Gilbert claimed in 2015 that Robinson had told party activists he would step down to allow Greg Beales, Director of Strategy and Planning for the Labour Party and a former aide to Ed Miliband, to contest his seat. An email appeared to show Beales and Robinson discussing introductions to prominent members of the local Labour party. The email, apparently sent before any announcement of Robinson's resignation, suggested selection of a new MP would take place within two weeks. A second email, addressed to senior members of the local party, stated categorically that Mr Robinson would stand down before the next election; it appears the local Labour party was concerned Labour HQ would deprive them of an opportunity to freely choose the next candidate by strongly referencing Beales. In the end he did not stand down; Robinson contested and won Coventry North West at the 2015 and 2017 elections.

Robinson supported Remain in the EU referendum and subsequently voted against the EU Withdrawal Bill, in line with his party's whip.

In May 2019 it was alleged that Robinson had been a spy for the communist Czechoslovak government, shared 87 confidential pieces of defence-related information between 1966 and 1969. Robinson is alleged to have had 51 meetings with Czechoslovak authorities and had also been in contact with Russian KGB agents. He denied the allegations, stating: "at no time did he ever pass confidential government documents or information to any foreign agent and he did not have access to such material."

Robinson was among a number of Labour MPs who did not seek re-election at the 2019 general election.

== Coventry City F.C. ==
Robinson has had a long association with Coventry City F.C., being a member of the board of directors from 1996. In 1997, when Robinson was made Paymaster General, he was forced to stand down from the board because members of the government were not permitted to hold directorships. Brenda Price, a former colleague from his Triumph Motorcycle board days at Meriden sat on the Coventry City board with him. In response to this the football club named him as honorary President but he eventually re-took his seat on the board of directors in 2002. On 21 September 2005, Robinson was named as acting Chairman of Coventry City after chairman Mike McGinnity was asked to step down by his doctor for an indefinite period due to ongoing health problems. Robinson was appointed chairman permanently on 3 November after McGinnity was forced to resign due to his health problems. On 10 October 2007 he announced that he would step down as chairman because "there are not enough hours in the day". He remains a director of the club.

== Personal life ==
Robinson married Marie Elena Giorgio in 1967. They have a son and a daughter.

Parliament of the United Kingdom
Preceded by Maurice Edelman	Member of Parliament for Coventry North West; 1976–2019	Succeeded by Taiwo Owatemi
Political offices
Preceded by Michael Bates	Paymaster General; 1997–1998	Succeeded by Dawn Primarolo
Business positions
Preceded by Mike McGinnity	Coventry City F.C. chairman 2005–2007	Succeeded by Ray Ranson
