= 1976 Coventry North West by-election =

UK parliamentary by-election

← Oct. 1974	4 March 1976	1979 →

Constituency of Coventry North West
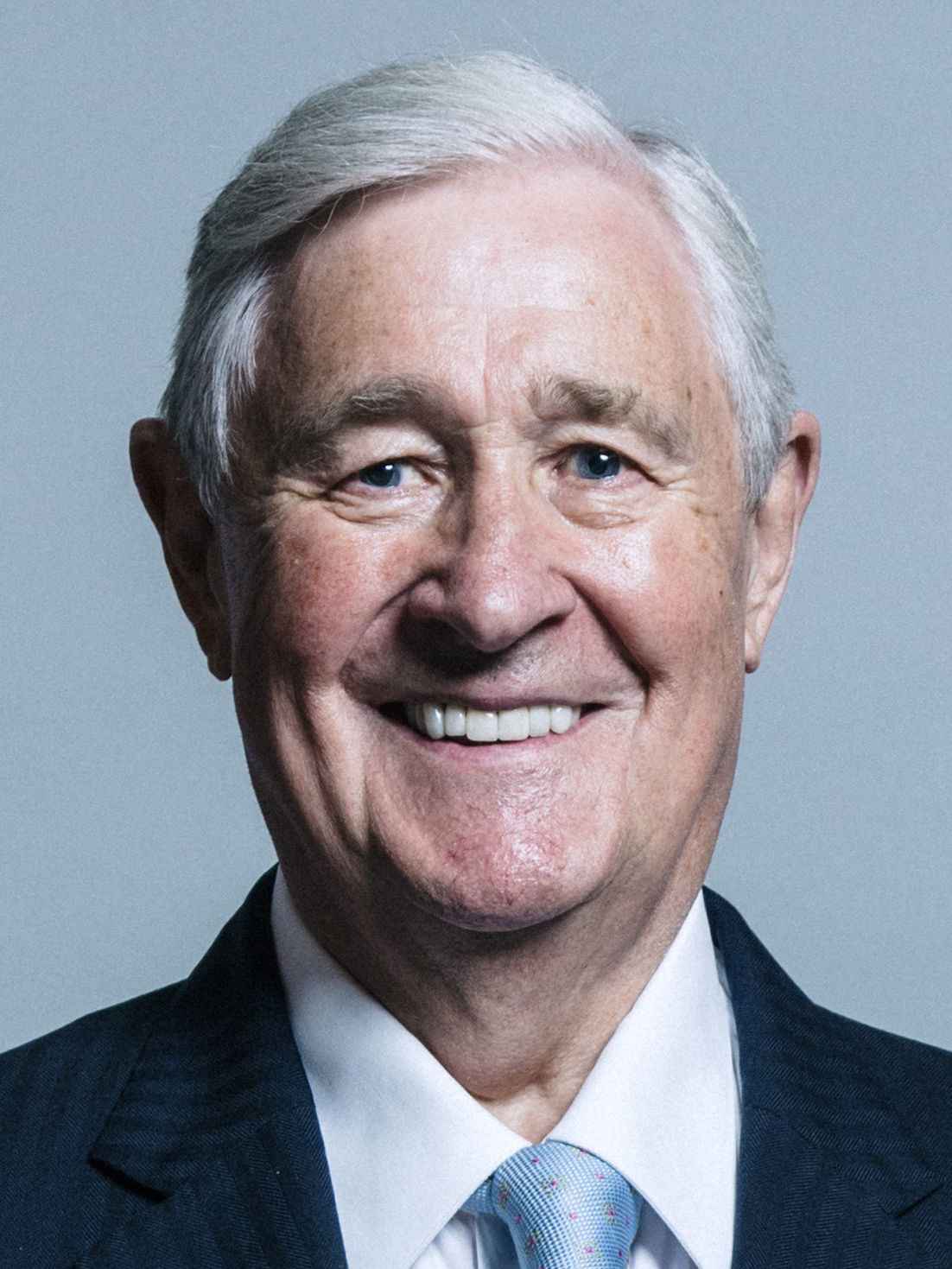
	First party	Second party	Third party
		Con	Lib
Candidate	Geoffrey Robinson	Jonathan Guinness	Alan Leighton
Party	Labour	Conservative	Liberal
Popular vote	17,118	13,424	4,062
Percentage	47.72%	37.42%	11.32%
Swing	▼4.14%	▲6.08%	▼4.34%
MP before election
Maurice Edelman
Labour
Elected MP
Geoffrey Robinson
Labour

The 1976 Coventry North West by-election, in Coventry on 4 March 1976, was held after the death of Labour Member of Parliament (MP) Maurice Edelman. A safe Labour seat, it was won by Geoffrey Robinson, who retained the seat until 2019.

== Party performance ==
The by-election represented the first outing for the National Party; it had recently split from the National Front and both parties ran candidates in the election. Although both polled poorly, it set a trend for a split far right vote which was replicated in the 1989 Vauxhall by-election and elsewhere.

The Liberal Party vote fell in this by-election, a development that former leader Jo Grimond blamed in part on scandals surrounding incumbent Jeremy Thorpe's homosexuality. Grimond suggested that the result and the allegations meant that Thorpe "must think of stepping down". Thorpe stood down as Liberal leader two months later.

== Result ==
Coventry North West by-election, 1976
Party	Candidate	Votes	%	±%
Labour	Geoffrey Robinson	17,118	47.72	−4.14
Conservative	Jonathan Guinness	13,424	37.42	+6.08
Liberal	Alan Leighton	4,062	11.32	−4.34
National Front	Andrew Fountaine	986	2.75	New
National Party	John Kingsley Read	208	0.60	New
More Prosperous Britain	Thomas Keen	40	0.11	New
Logic Party	William Dunmore	33	0.09	New
Majority		3,694	10.30	
Turnout		35,871		
Labour hold		Swing		
