= Simon Gilbert (journalist) =

English journalist and author (born 1984)

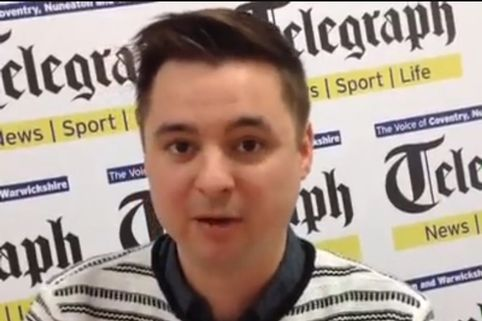
- Gilbert in 2017
- Born: 6 June 1984 (age 41); Nuneaton, Warwickshire, England
- Education: Liverpool University; Liverpool Hope University
- Occupations: Journalist, author

Simon Gilbert (born 6 June 1984) is an English journalist and author. He is a political reporter on radio, online and TV for the BBC and appears regularly on BBC CWR, BBC Radio WM, Midlands Today and Politics Midlands.

Previously, he was the chief reporter at the Coventry Telegraph and a regular contributor to the Daily Mirror.

He led the Coventry Telegraph's #bringCityhome campaign in the summer of 2014. The campaign played a role in Coventry City F.C.'s return to the city following their exile at Sixfields in Northampton. Gilbert and the campaign were shortlisted at the Press Gazette British Journalism Awards 2014 in the Campaign of the Year category and Gilbert won the Campaign of the Year Title at the 2014 Pride of Trinity Mirror Awards. The campaign also resulted in Gilbert becoming the only regional newspaper journalist in the country to be shortlisted in the Sports Journalist of the Year category at the 2014 British Journalism Awards.

His work was praised in the House of Commons by then Coventry North East MP Bob Ainsworth and the MP for Folkestone and Hythe, Damian Collins.

Gilbert's coverage around the Ricoh Arena fiasco led to him producing a book which documents the history of the stadium project and Coventry City F.C.'s subsequent fall from grace. The book entitled Coventry City: A Club Without a Home: The Fight Behind The Sky Blues' Return from Exile is published by Pitch Publishing and was released in October 2016.

In 2015, Gilbert was awarded Highly Commended prizes at the Midlands Media awards in three categories: Sports Journalist of the Year, Scoop of the Year and Campaign of the Year.

In 2016, he was shortlisted for Business Journalist of the Year at the Midlands Media Awards.

In 2017, he was shortlisted for Sports Journalist of the Year at the Midlands Media Awards.

In 2019, he was shortlisted in two categories at the Midlands Media Awards: Television Journalist of the Year and Radio Journalist of the Year. He was Highly Commended in the Radio Journalist of the Year category.

== Notable work ==
In September 2014, Gilbert broke a national exclusive which reported English Premiership rugby union side Wasps RFC were in talks to permanently relocate to the Ricoh Arena, in Coventry, from their home at Adams Park, in High Wycombe. The club later confirmed the takeover of the stadium and moved to the Ricoh Arena in December 2014.

In March 2015, Gilbert revealed that long-serving MP Geoffrey Robinson had told party activists he would step down to allow Greg Beales, Director of Strategy and Planning for the Labour Party and a former aide to Ed Miliband, to contest his seat. An email seen by Gilbert appeared to show Beales and Robinson discussing introductions to prominent members of the local Labour party. The email, apparently sent before any announcement of Robinson's resignation, suggested selection of a new MP would take place within two weeks. A second email, addressed to senior members of the local party, was also later exposed by Gilbert. It stated categorically that Mr Robinson would stand down before the next election; it appears the local Labour party was concerned Labour HQ would deprive them of an opportunity to freely choose the next candidate by strongly referencing Beales. A u-turn would appear to have taken place, due to the Coventry Telegraph coverage and Robinson eventually contested and won Coventry North West.

In September 2015, he broke the news that Maryam Namazie had been banned from speaking at the University of Warwick. The story prompted outcry from the likes of Brian Cox, Salman Rushdie and Richard Dawkins and the ban was overturned a few days later.

In October 2015, Gilbert reported from the scene of the fatal city centre bus crash in Coventry which claimed the lives of two people. He was interviewed live on BBC News and Sky News as the national media sought clarification of the details surrounding the tragedy.

Throughout 2016 and 2017, Gilbert undertook a series of interviews for national newspapers on the situation at Coventry City. He provide comment for The Guardian, Vice Sports and the i.

Gilbert's work on Coventry City led to a Parliamentary debate over the off the field issues at the club, and subsequent mediation, between various parties involved in the dispute.

In April 2017, Gilbert appeared on BBC One's Football Focus discussing Coventry City's off-field problems.

Gilbert exclusively revealed details of a leaked letter by Warwickshire Police to the Home Office in reports aired during September 2019 across the BBC. The letter, signed by the force's chief constable and the Warwickshire Police and Crime Commissioner, talked about the potential collapse of the police force and lives being "put at risk" as a result of the alliance with West Mercia Police being terminated.
