= Coventry West =

Parliamentary constituency in the United Kingdom, 1945–1950

- Former borough constituency for the House of Commons

1945–1950
- Seats: one
- Created from: Coventry
- Replaced by: Coventry North, Coventry South

Coventry West was a parliamentary constituency in the city of Coventry in the West Midlands of England. It returned one Member of Parliament (MP) to the House of Commons of the Parliament of the United Kingdom, elected by the first past the post system.

== History ==
The constituency was created for the 1945 general election, and abolished for the 1950 general election.

== Boundaries ==
The County Borough of Coventry wards of Bablake, Cheylesmore, Earlsdon, Greyfriars, Radford, and Westwood.

== Members of Parliament ==
Election	Member	Party
1945	Maurice Edelman	Labour
1950	constituency abolished	

== Election results ==
=== Elections in the 1940s ===
General election 1945: Coventry West
Party	Candidate	Votes	%	±%
Labour	Maurice Edelman	38,249	62.2	
Conservative	William Strickland	23,236	37.8	
Majority		15,013	24.4	
Turnout		61,485	66.1	
Labour win (new seat)				
