= Austin Seven =

There were four Austin cars to use the Seven name:

- The 1909–1911 Austin 7 hp
- The 1922–1939 Austin 7
- The launch title of the Austin A30
- The original Mini

The name Austin Seven was also used to refer to the LMS Class 7F 0-8-0 engines.
