= Joska Bourgeois =

Belgian businesswoman

Joska Bourgeois

Joska Bourgeois (c.1913 – 9 October 1994) was a Belgian businesswoman who was the Belgian agent for Jaguar and later Toyota cars. Bourgeois became notable after her death for her relationship with the British businessman and politician Geoffrey Robinson, who was the recipient of a £12.75 million trust fund established by Bourgeois.

== Early years ==
Bourgeois's father was a diplomat who had become wealthy through importing jewels, carpets and furniture from Iran. Bourgeois had a sister, and their father gave them gifts of gold until they possessed their exact weight in gold on Bourgeois's 26th birthday.

Differing accounts exist of Bourgeois's activities during World War II. Bourgeois was reported to have hidden British soldiers as a member of the Belgian resistance, or that she passed information about the Nazis to Belgian freedom fighters while working as a waitress in a cafe frequented by German officers. It has also been stated that Bourgeois drove an ambulance during the war, and was decorated for her bravery at the conclusion of the war.

Bourgeois was at one point married to George Buydendyk, the former European chief executive of tyre manufacturers Goodyear.

== Jaguar and Toyota ==
In 1947, Bourgeois met a Canadian soldier, and persuaded him to take her to England, where she went to the house of Jaguar Cars co-founder William Lyons. Bourgeois subsequently negotiated a five-year agreement to sell Jaguars in Belgium, under the auspices of her newly created Anglo-Belgian Motor Company, and would sell between 400-500 Jaguars annually for the next twenty years. In 1973, British Leyland, the owners of Jaguar, planned to end all contracts with foreign distributors of Jaguars without compensation, and Bourgeois went to Coventry to meet with executives from the company. Bourgeois met Geoffrey Robinson, an executive at Leyland, and he would subsequently help her negotiate distribution agreements with Toyota, who had replaced Jaguar as Bourgeois's primary income.

By 1979 Bourgeois's International Motor Company owned the franchises to sell Toyota and Daihatsu cars and Bridgestone tyres in Belgium, and Robinson advised her during the negotiations over the sale of the company for £14.6 million to Inchcape that year.

== Later years ==
Bourgeois became a tax exile after the sale of her company, and never returned to her native Belgium, moving to Geneva in the tax haven of Switzerland. Bourgeois spent her summers in Cannes, on the Cote d'Azur in the south of France, where she owned a 400sq m penthouse apartment on the Avenue Hesperides. In 1993 Bourgeois bought Marshcourt, a Grade I listed Arts and Crafts style country house near Stockbridge, Hampshire, designed by Edwin Lutyens. Bourgeois bought Marshcourt for £630,000, but allowed Robinson to appear as the owner of the house.

Bourgeois provided the collateral to help Robinson gain a £100,000 loan from Credit Suisse that he required to start the electronics company TransTec in 1981.

Bourgeois's companion towards the end of her life was the Algerian Saad Boudamagh. Bourgeois invested £500,000 in an Algerian sweet factory for Boudamagh. Bourgeois's jewellery collection, which she had estimated was worth $10 million, was donated to the Pasteur Institute after her death, and eventually sold at auction at Christie's in 1995 for $700,000.

Bourgeois died in Cannes in 1994, and was worth an estimated £35 million at her death. Her fortune was divided between Robinson and Boudamagh; Robinson also inherited all her property. Her funeral was held at the L'Eglise Saint-Lambert in Brussels.

In November 1997 it was revealed by Chris Blackhurst in an article for the Independent on Sunday that Robinson had been a discretionary beneficiary of a £12.75 million offshore trust for him and his family established by Bourgeois, called Orion, based in the tax haven of Guernsey. In 2000 the trust was reported have been worth £38 million.

== Notes ==
- Bower, Tom (2001). The Paymaster: Geoffrey Robinson, Maxwell and New Labour. Simon & Schuster. ISBN 978-0-7432-0689-1.
