= Pat Appleyard =

British rally driver and co-driver (1927–2025)

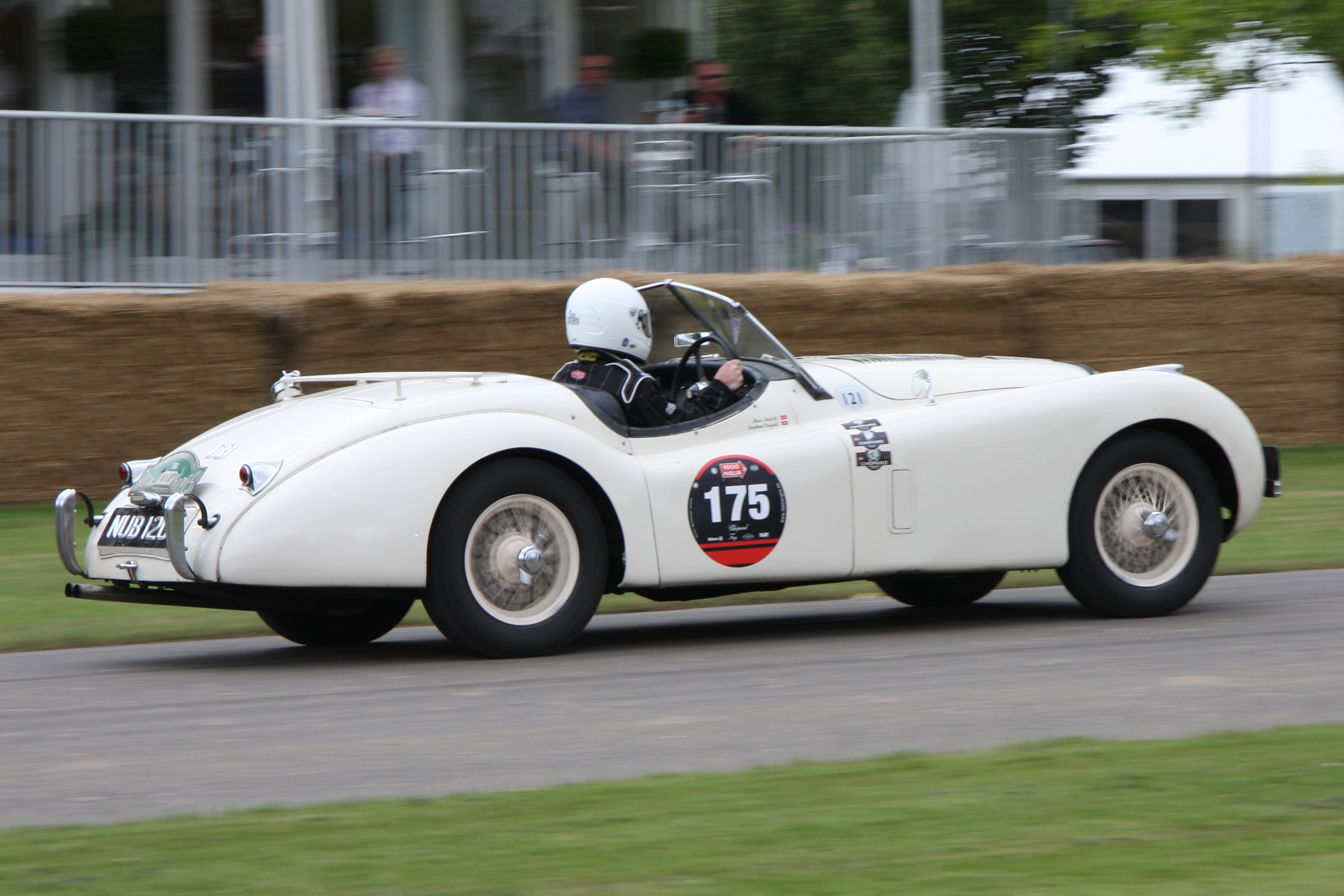
The Appleyards' 1950, 1951 and 1952 Coupe des Alpes-winning Jaguar XK120, registration NUB 120, being demonstrated at Goodwood in 2008

Patricia C. Quinn (née Lyons; 23 April 1927 – 11 October 2025), best known by her former married name Pat Appleyard, was a British rally driver and co-driver.

== Early life and motorsport career ==
Patricia C. Lyons was born on 23 April 1927, the daughter of Jaguar Cars founder Sir William Lyons. Co-driving with her then-husband, Ian Appleyard, she won the Alpine Rally's Coupe des Alpes each year from 1950 to 1953, in one of her father's company's Jaguar XK120 cars. On the third of these triumphs, in 1952, the Appleyards were the first crew ever to be awarded the event's Coupe d'Or (Gold Cup), for having won three consecutive Coupes des Alpes. During their competitive career the couple's major event victories also included the 1951 and 1953 RAC Rallies, and the 1951 Tulip Rally, and they were runners-up in the 1953 European Rally Championship. Her own driving career was less successful than her husband's, a fact that she herself partly put down to being unable to find suitably qualified female co-drivers, but nevertheless, she won a number of ladies' trophies in British events.

== Later life and death ==
Appleyard remarried in 1962, and latterly became well known as a farmer of rare breed livestock, including Cotswold sheep and English Longhorn cattle, at her farm in the Cotswolds. She died on 11 October 2025, at the age of 98.
