= Coventry North West =

UK Parliament constituency (since 1974)

Coordinates: 52.43°N 1.56°W

- Borough constituency for the House of Commons
- Interactive map of boundaries from 1997
- Boundary of Coventry North West in West Midlands region
- County: West Midlands
- Electorate: 73,431 (2023)

Current constituency
- Created: 1974
- Member of Parliament: Taiwo Owatemi (Labour)
- Seats: One
- Created from: Coventry North

Coventry North West is a constituency (Note: A borough constituency (for the purposes of election expenses and type of returning officer)) in the city of Coventry represented in the House of Commons of the UK Parliament since 2019 by Taiwo Owatemi of the Labour Party. (Note: As with all constituencies, the constituency elects one Member of Parliament (MP) by the first past the post system of election at least every five years.)

== Constituency profile ==
Coventry North West is a mostly urban and suburban constituency which covers the north-western neighbourhoods of Coventry, a city in the West Midlands. Areas of the city contained within the constituency include Earlsdon, Eastern Green, Allesley, Coundon, Radford and Holbrooks. Coventry is a historic cathedral city which became an important centre for the British motor industry in the mid-20th century, but suffered a decline after the closure of most factories in the 1980s. The constituency contains some areas of deprivation in Radford and Holbrooks, whilst Allesley and the rural parts of the constituency are generally affluent. House prices in the area are low.

Residents' levels of income, education and professional employment are marginally lower than national averages. White people make up 75% of the population with Asians, primarily Indians, forming the largest ethnic minority group at 13%. At the city council level, most of the constituency is represented by Labour Party councillors, although Eastern Green and the rural parts elected Conservatives. An estimated 57% of voters in Coventry North West supported leaving the European Union in the 2016 referendum, higher than the nationwide figure of 52%.

== Boundaries ==
1974–1983: The County Borough of Coventry wards of Bablake, Holbrook, Radford, and Sherbourne.

1983–1997: The City of Coventry wards of Bablake, Holbrook, Radford, and Sherbourne.

1997–present: The City of Coventry wards of Bablake, Holbrook, Radford, Sherbourne, Whoberley, and Woodlands.

The 2023 Periodic Review of Westminster constituencies left the boundaries unchanged.

== History ==
The area's electorate has roughly grown in line with national trends, leading to minimal boundary changes and has elected Labour MPs at every election since its first election in February 1974.

In 2019, the long-time incumbent Geoffrey Robinson retired, and at the ensuing general election the Conservatives achieved a swing of more than 8% in their favour, with the Labour majority falling to three figures for the first time in the seat's history, but the seat swung strongly to Labour in 2024, the largest majority they have had in the constituency since 1997.

== Members of Parliament ==
Election	Member	Party	Notes
Feb 1974	Maurice Edelman	Labour	Died December 1975
1976 by-election	Geoffrey Robinson	Labour	Paymaster General 1997–1998
2019	Taiwo Owatemi	Labour	

== Elections ==
=== Elections in the 2020s ===
General election 2024: Coventry North West
Party	Candidate	Votes	%	±%
Labour	Taiwo Owatemi	19,696	46.9	▲3.1
Conservative	Tom Mercer	8,522	20.3	▼23.1
Reform	Holly-Mae Nelson	7,950	18.9	▲14.8
Green	Esther Reeves	3,420	8.1	▲5.1
Liberal Democrats	Tom Holder	1,931	4.6	▼1.1
Independent	Elizabeth Richard	511	1.2	New
Majority		11,174	26.6	▲26.2
Turnout		42,030	56.5	▼9.0
Labour hold		Swing	▲13.1	

=== Elections in the 2010s ===
General election 2019: Coventry North West
Party	Candidate	Votes	%	±%
Labour	Taiwo Owatemi	20,918	43.8	▼10.2
Conservative	Clare Golby	20,710	43.4	▲6.7
Liberal Democrats	Greg Judge	2,717	5.7	▲4.1
Brexit Party	Joshua Richardson	1,956	4.1	New
Green	Stephen Gray	1,443	3.0	▲1.7
Majority		208	0.4	▼16.9
Turnout		47,744	63.5	▼2.8
Labour hold		Swing	▼8.4	

General election 2017: Coventry North West
Party	Candidate	Votes	%	±%
Labour	Geoffrey Robinson	26,894	54.0	▲13.0
Conservative	Resham Kotecha	18,314	36.7	▲5.7
UKIP	Michael Gee	1,525	3.1	▼12.6
Liberal Democrats	Andrew Hilton	1,286	2.6	▼1.4
Independent	Ciaran Norris	1,164	2.3	New
Green	Stephen Gray	666	1.3	▼3.0
Majority		8,580	17.3	▲7.3
Turnout		49,849	66.3	▲5.6
Labour hold		Swing		

General election 2015: Coventry North West
Party	Candidate	Votes	%	±%
Labour	Geoffrey Robinson	18,557	41.0	▼1.8
Conservative	Parvez Akhtar	14,048	31.0	▲1.7
UKIP	Harjinder Sehmi	7,101	15.7	▲12.9
Green	Laura Vesty	1,961	4.3	▲3.2
Liberal Democrats	Andrew Furse	1,810	4.0	▼13.9
TUSC	Dave Nellist	1,769	3.9	New
Majority		4,509	10.0	▼3.5
Turnout		45,246	60.7	▲2.8
Labour hold		Swing		

General election 2010: Coventry North West
Party	Candidate	Votes	%	±%
Labour	Geoffrey Robinson	19,936	42.8	▼5.2
Conservative	Gary Ridley	13,648	29.3	▲2.7
Liberal Democrats	Vincent McKee	8,344	17.9	▼0.5
BNP	Edward Sheppard	1,666	3.6	▼0.1
UKIP	Mark Nattrass	1,295	2.8	▲1.0
Independent	Nobby Clarke	640	1.4	New
Green	Justin Wood	497	1.1	New
Socialist	Nicky Downes	370	0.8	▼0.7
Christian Movement for Great Britain	William Sidhu	164	0.4	New
Majority		6,288	13.5	▼7.9
Turnout		46,560	63.9	▲3.8
Labour hold		Swing	▼3.9	

=== Elections in the 2000s ===
General election 2005: Coventry North West
Party	Candidate	Votes	%	±%
Labour	Geoffrey Robinson	20,942	48.2	▼3.2
Conservative	Brian Connell	11,627	26.8	▲0.9
Liberal Democrats	Iona Anderson	7,932	18.3	▲4.6
BNP	David Clarke	1,556	3.6	New
UKIP	Sandra List	766	1.8	▲0.3
Socialist	Nicky Downes	615	1.4	New
Majority		9,315	21.4	▼4.1
Turnout		43,438	59.4	▲3.9
Labour hold		Swing	▼2.0	

General election 2001: Coventry North West
Party	Candidate	Votes	%	±%
Labour	Geoffrey Robinson	21,892	51.4	▼5.5
Conservative	Andrew Fairburn	11,018	25.9	▼0.4
Liberal Democrats	Napier Penlington	5,832	13.7	▲3.2
Independent	Christine Oddy	3,159	7.4	New
UKIP	Mark Benson	650	1.5	New
Majority		10,874	25.5	▼5.0
Turnout		42,551	55.5	▼15.2
Labour hold		Swing		

=== Elections in the 1990s ===
General election 1997: Coventry North West
Party	Candidate	Votes	%	±%
Labour	Geoffrey Robinson	30,901	56.86	
Conservative	Paul Bartlett	14,300	26.33	
Liberal Democrats	Napier Penlington	5,690	10.48	
Referendum	Douglas Butler	1,269	2.34	New
Socialist Labour	Dave Spencer	940	1.73	New
Liberal	Rob Wheway	687	1.27	New
ProLife Alliance	Paul Mills	359	0.66	New
Rainbow Dream Ticket	Leslie Francis	176	0.32	New
Majority		16,601	30.53	
Turnout		54,322	70.69	
Labour hold		Swing		

General election 1992: Coventry North West
Party	Candidate	Votes	%	±%
Labour	Geoffrey Robinson	20,349	51.7	▲2.7
Conservative	Agnes A. B. Hill	13,917	35.4	▲0.7
Liberal Democrats	Ann Simpson	5,070	12.9	▼3.4
Majority		6,432	16.3	▲2.0
Turnout		39,336	77.6	▲2.8
Labour hold		Swing	▲1.0	

=== Elections in the 1980s ===
General election 1987: Coventry North West
Party	Candidate	Votes	%	±%
Labour	Geoffrey Robinson	19,450	49.0	▲4.7
Conservative	James Powell	13,787	34.7	▼1.8
SDP	Hywel Jones	6,455	16.3	▼2.9
Majority		5,663	14.3	▲6.5
Turnout		39,692	74.8	▲0.1
Labour hold		Swing	▲3.2	

General election 1983: Coventry North West
Party	Candidate	Votes	%	±%
Labour	Geoffrey Robinson	17,239	44.3	▼5.7
Conservative	Anthony Coombs	14,201	36.5	▼3.4
Liberal	Bill Talbot	7,479	19.2	▲10.4
Majority		3,038	7.8	▼2.4
Turnout		38,919	74.7	▼4.5
Labour hold		Swing	▼1.1	

=== Elections in the 1970s ===
General election 1979: Coventry North West
Party	Candidate	Votes	%	±%
Labour	Geoffrey Robinson	19,460	50.13	
Conservative	Derek Miles	15,489	39.90	
Liberal	Chris Poole	3,413	8.79	
National Front	Alan Stewart	359	0.92	N/A
More Prosperous Britain	Tom Keen	98	0.25	N/A
Majority		3,971	10.23	
Turnout		38,819	79.21	
Labour hold		Swing		

By-election 1976: Coventry North West
Party	Candidate	Votes	%	±%
Labour	Geoffrey Robinson	17,118	47.72	▼4.14
Conservative	Jonathan Guinness	13,424	37.42	▲6.08
Liberal	Alan Leighton	4,062	11.32	▼4.34
National Front	Andrew Fountaine	986	2.75	New
National Party	John Kingsley Read	208	0.60	New
More Prosperous Britain	Thomas Keen	40	0.11	New
Logic Party	William Dunmore	33	0.09	New
Majority		3,694	10.30	
Turnout		35,871		
Labour hold		Swing		

General election October 1974: Coventry North West
Party	Candidate	Votes	%	±%
Labour	Maurice Edelman	19,205	51.86	
Conservative	Jonathan Guinness	11,717	31.64	
Liberal	Patricia Newnham	5,798	15.66	New
PEOPLE	Lesley Whittaker	313	0.85	
Majority		7,488	20.22	
Turnout		37,033	75.20	
Labour hold		Swing		

General election February 1974: Coventry North West
Party	Candidate	Votes	%	±%
Labour	Maurice Edelman	22,089	56.55	
Conservative	Charles L. Wade	15,431	39.50	
PEOPLE	Lesley Whittaker	1,542	3.95	
Majority		6,658	17.05	
Turnout		39,062	79.78	
Labour win (new seat)				

== See also ==
- List of parliamentary constituencies in the West Midlands (county)
- List of parliamentary constituencies in West Midlands (region)
