= Parliamentary constituencies in Warwickshire =

The county of Warwickshire is divided into 6 parliamentary constituencies: 5 county constituencies and 1 borough constituency.

== Constituencies ==
† Conservative ‡ Labour ¤ Liberal Democrat

| Constituency (Note: BC denotes borough constituency, CC denotes county constituency.) | Electorate | Majority (Note: The majority is the number of votes the winning candidate receives more than their nearest rival.) | Member of Parliament | Nearest Opposition | Electoral wards | Map |
|---|---|---|---|---|---|---|
| Kenilworth and Southam CC | 74,923 | 6,574 | Jeremy Wright† | Cat Price‡ | Rugby Borough Council: Dunsmore, Leam Valley. Stratford on Avon District Council: Bishop’s Itchington, Harbury, Kineton, Long Itchington & Stockton, Napton & Fenny Compton, Red Horse, Southam North, Southam South, Wellesbourne East, Wellesbourne West. Warwick District Council: Budbrooke, Cubbington & Leek Wootton, Kenilworth Abbey & Arden, Kenilworth Park Hill, Kenilworth St. John’s. | Map showing the location of the Kenilworth and Southam constituency in Warwickshire under the boundaries created by the 2023 boundary review and first used at the 2024 general election. |
| North Warwickshire and Bedworth CC | 69,752 | 2,198 | Rachel Taylor‡ | Craig Tracey† | North Warwickshire Borough Council: Atherstone Central, Atherstone North, Atherstone South and Mancetter, Baddesley and Grendon, Coleshill North, Coleshill South, Curdworth, Dordon, Fillongley, Hurley and Wood End, Kingsbury, Newton Regis and Warton, Polesworth East, Polesworth West, Water Orton. Nuneaton and Bedworth Borough Council: Bede, Exhall, Heath, Poplar, Slough. | Map showing the location of the North Warwickshire and Bedworth constituency in Warwickshire under the boundaries created by the 2023 boundary review and first used at the 2024 general election. |
| Nuneaton CC | 71,843 | 3,479 | Jodie Gosling‡ | Marcus Jones† | North Warwickshire Borough Council: Arley and Whitacre, Hartshill. Nuneaton and Bedworth Borough Council: Abbey, Arbury, Attleborough, Bar Pool, Camp Hill, Galley Common, Kingswood, St Nicolas, Weddington, Wem Brook, Whitestone. | Map showing the location of the Nuneaton constituency in Warwickshire under the boundaries created by the 2023 boundary review and first used at the 2024 general election. |
| Rugby CC | 74,901 | 4,428 | John Slinger‡ | Yousef Dahmash† | Nuneaton and Bedworth Borough Council: Bulkington. Rugby Borough Council: Admirals and Cawston, Benn, Bilton, Clifton, Newton and Churchover, Coton and Boughton, Eastlands, Hillmorton, New Bilton, Newbold and Brownsover, Paddox, Revel and Binley Woods, Rokeby and Overslade, Wolston and the Lawfords, Wolvey and Shilton. | Map showing the location of the Rugby constituency in Warwickshire under the boundaries created by the 2023 boundary review and first used at the 2024 general election. |
| Stratford-on-Avon CC | 75,725 | 7,122 | Manuela Perteghella¤ | Chris Clarkson† | Stratford on Avon District Council: Alcester and Rural, Alcester Town, Avenue, Bidford East, Bidford West and Salford, Bishopton, Brailes and Compton, Bridgetown, Clopton, Ettington, Guildhall, Hathaway, Henley-in-Arden, Kinwarton, Quinton, Shipston North, Shipston South, Shottery, Snitterfield, Studley with Mappleborough Green, Studley with Sambourne, Tanworth-in-Arden, Tiddington, Welcombe, Welford-on-Avon, Wotton Wawen. | Map showing the location of the Stratford-on-Avon constituency in Warwickshire under the boundaries created by the 2023 boundary review and first used at the 2024 general election. |
| Warwick and Leamington BC | 76,294 | 12,412 | Matt Western‡ | James Uffindell† | Warwick District Council: Bishop’s Tachbrook, Leamington Brunswick, Leamington Clarendon, Leamington Lillington, Leamington Milverton, Leamington Willes, Radford Semele, Warwick All Saints and Woodloes, Warwick Aylesford, Warwick Myton and Heathcote, Warwick Saltisford, Whitnash. | Map showing the location of the Warwick and Leamington constituency in Warwickshire under the boundaries created by the 2023 boundary review and first used at the 2024 general election. |

== Boundary changes ==
=== 2024 ===
See 2023 review of Westminster constituencies for further details.

Name
1. Kenilworth and Southam CC
2. North Warwickshire CC / North Warwickshire and Bedworth CC
3. Nuneaton CC
4. Rugby CC
5. Stratford-on-Avon CC
6. Warwick and Leamington BC
Boundaries 2010–2024

Proposed Revision

Boundaries 2024–present

For the 2023 review of Westminster constituencies, which redrew the constituency map ahead of the 2024 United Kingdom general election, the Boundary Commission for England opted to retain the six constituencies in Warwickshire, with minor boundary changes primarily to reflect changes to ward boundaries. Although its boundaries are unchanged, North Warwickshire was renamed North Warwickshire and Bedworth.

=== 2010 ===
Under the fifth periodic review of Westminster constituencies, the Boundary Commission for England decided to the number of constituencies in Warwickshire from 5 to 6 for the 2010 election, with the creation of the new constituency of Kenilworth and Southam, combining the two towns of Kenilworth, transferred from Rugby and Kenilworth (renamed Rugby), and Southam, transferred from Stratford-on-Avon. The revised, more compact, Warwick and Leamington constituency was redesignated as a Borough constituency.

Name 1997–2010
1. North Warwickshire CC
2. Nuneaton CC
3. Rugby and Kenilworth CC
4. Stratford-on-Avon CC
5. Warwick and Leamington CC
Boundaries 1997–2010

Parliamentary constituencies in Warwickshire

Name 2010–2024
1. Kenilworth and Southam CC
2. North Warwickshire CC
3. Nuneaton CC
4. Rugby CC
5. Stratford-on-Avon CC
6. Warwick and Leamington BC
Boundaries 2010–2024

Proposed Revision

== Results history ==
Primary data source: House of Commons research briefing - General election results from 1918 to 2019

=== 2024 ===
The number of votes cast for each political party who fielded candidates in constituencies comprising Warwickshire in the 2024 general election were as follows:

| Party | Votes | % | Change from 2019 | Seats | Change from 2019 |
|---|---|---|---|---|---|
| Labour | 90,025 | 31.4% | ▲4.5% | 4 | ▲3 |
| Conservative | 86,657 | 30.2% | ▼26.9% | 1 | ▼4 |
| Reform | 47,812 | 16.7% | ▲16.4% | 0 | 0 |
| Liberal Democrats | 43,615 | 15.2% | ▲3.2% | 1 | ▲1 |
| Greens | 15,998 | 5.6% | ▲2.1% | 0 | 0 |
| Others | 2,507 | 0.9% | ▲0.7% | 0 | 0 |
| Total | 286,614 | 100.0 | | 6 | |

=== Percentage votes ===
| Election year | 1983 | 1987 | 1992 | 1997 | 2001 | 2005 | 2010 | 2015 | 2017 | 2019 | 2024 |
|---|---|---|---|---|---|---|---|---|---|---|---|
| Labour | 24.3 | 26.3 | 33.4 | 43.8 | 42.4 | 36.9 | 27.6 | 26.8 | 35.3 | 26.9 | 31.4 |
| Conservative | 49.2 | 50.9 | 49.6 | 38.7 | 39.4 | 40.7 | 45.7 | 50.3 | 55.1 | 57.1 | 30.2 |
| Reform | - | - | - | - | - | - | - | - | - | 0.3 | 16.7 |
| Liberal Democrat^{1} | 26.0 | 22.1 | 16.0 | 13.9 | 15.6 | 17.9 | 20.5 | 6.2 | 6.2 | 12.0 | 15.2 |
| Green Party | - | * | * | * | * | * | 0.8 | 3.3 | 2.1 | 3.5 | 5.6 |
| UKIP | - | - | - | * | * | * | 2.0 | 13.0 | 1.1 | * | * |
| Other | 0.4 | 0.7 | 0.9 | 3.6 | 2.5 | 4.5 | 3.4 | 0.4 | 0.2 | 0.2 | 0.9 |

^{1}1983 & 1987 - SDP–Liberal Alliance

* Included in Other

=== Seats ===
| Election year | 1983 | 1987 | 1992 | 1997 | 2001 | 2005 | 2010 | 2015 | 2017 | 2019 | 2024 |
|---|---|---|---|---|---|---|---|---|---|---|---|
| Labour | 0 | 0 | 2 | 4 | 4 | 3 | 0 | 0 | 1 | 1 | 4 |
| Conservative | 5 | 5 | 3 | 1 | 1 | 2 | 6 | 6 | 5 | 5 | 1 |
| Liberal Democrats | 0 | 0 | 0 | 0 | 0 | 0 | 0 | 0 | 0 | 0 | 1 |
| Total | 5 | 5 | 5 | 5 | 5 | 5 | 6 | 6 | 6 | 6 | 6 |

=== Maps ===
==== 1885-1910 ====
1885

1886

1892

1895

1900

1906

Jan 1910

Dec 1910

==== 1918-1945 ====
1918

1922

1923

1924

1929

1931

1935

1945

==== 1950-1979 ====
1950

1951

1955

1959

1964

1966

1970

Feb 1974

Oct 1974

1979

==== 1983-present ====
1983

1987

1992

1997

2001

2005

2010

2015

2017

2019

2024

== Historical representation by party ==
A cell marked → (with a different colour background to the preceding cell) indicates that the previous MP continued to sit under a new party name.

=== 1885 to 1918 ===
Conservative Independent Labour Liberal Liberal-Labour Liberal Unionist Speaker

| Constituency | 1885 | 1886 | 87 | 89 | 91 | 1892 | 95 | 1895 | 98 | 99 | 1900 | 01 | 04 | 1906 | 09 | 09 | Jan 1910 | Dec 1910 | 11 | 12 | 14 | 17 |
|---|---|---|---|---|---|---|---|---|---|---|---|---|---|---|---|---|---|---|---|---|---|---|
| Aston Manor | Gilzean Reid | Kynoch | | | Grice-Hutchinson | | | | | | Cecil | | | | | | | | | | | |
| Birmingham Bordesley | Broadhurst | Collings | | | | | | | | | | | | | | | | | | → | | |
| Birmingham Central | J. Bright | → | | J. A. Bright | | | | Parkes | | | | | | | | | | | | → | | |
| Birmingham East | Cook | Matthews | | | | | | Stone | | | | | | | | | Steel-Maitland | | | | | |
| Birmingham Edgbaston | Dixon | → | | | | | | | Lowe | | | | | | | | | | | | | |
| Birmingham North | Kenrick | → | | | | | | | | Middlemore | | | | | | | | | | → | | |
| Birmingham South | Powell-Williams | → | | | | | | | | | | | Howard | | | | | | Amery | → | | |
| Birmingham West | J. Chamberlain | → | | | | | | | | | | | | | | | | | | → | A. Chamberlain | |
| Coventry | Eaton | | Ballantine | | | | | Murray | | | | | | A. Mason | | | J. Foster | D. Mason | | | | |
| Nuneaton | Johns | Dugdale | | | | Newdigate | | | | | | | | Johnson | | → | | | | | → | |
| Rugby | Cobb | | | | | | | Verney | | | Grant | | | | | | Baird | | | | | |
| Stratford upon Avon | Compton | Townsend | | | | Freeman-Mitford | | Milward | | | | P. Foster | | Kincaid-Smith | → | P. Foster | | | | | | |
| Tamworth | Muntz | | | | | | | | | | | | | | | Newdegate | | | | | | Wilson-Fox |
| Warwick and Leamington | Peel | | | | | | Lyttelton | | | | | | | Berridge | | | Pollock | | | | | |

=== 1918 to 1950 ===
Coalition National Democratic & Labour Conservative Independent Labour Liberal New Party

| Constituency | 1918 | 19 | 21 | 22 | 1922 | 1923 | 1924 | 1929 | 29 | 31 | 1931 | 35 | 1935 | 36 | 37 | 39 | 40 | 41 | 42 | 43 | 1945 |
|---|---|---|---|---|---|---|---|---|---|---|---|---|---|---|---|---|---|---|---|---|---|
| Birmingham Aston | Cecil | | | | | | | Strachey | | → | Hope | | | | | Kellett | | | | Prior | Wyatt |
| Birmingham Deritend | Dennis | | | | Crooke | | | Longden | | | Crooke | | | | | | | | | | Longden |
| Birmingham Duddeston | Hallas | → | | | Hiley | Burman | | Sawyer | | | Simmonds | | | | | | | | | | Wills |
| Birmingham Edgbaston | Lowe | | | | | | | N. Chamberlain | | | | | | | | | Bennett | | | | |
| Birmingham Erdington | Steel-Maitland | | | | | | | Simmons | | | Eales | | | Wright | | | | | | | Silverman |
| Birmingham Handsworth* | Meysey-Thompson | | | | Locker-Lampson | | | | | | | | | | | | | | | | Roberts |
| Birmingham King's Norton | Austin | | | | | | Dennison | Thomas | | | | | Cartland | | | | | Peto | | | Blackburn |
| Birmingham Ladywood | N. Chamberlain | | | | | | | Whiteley | | | Lloyd | | | | | | | | | | Yates |
| Birmingham Moseley | Rogers | | Hannon | | | | | | | | | | | | | | | | | | |
| Birmingham Sparkbrook | Amery | | | | | | | | | | | | | | | | | | | | Shurmer |
| Birmingham West | A. Chamberlain | | | | | | | | | | | | | | Higgs | | | | | | Simmons |
| Birmingham Yardley | Jephcott | | | | | | | Gossling | | | Salt | | | | | | | | | | Perrins |
| Coventry / Coventry East (1945) | Manville | | | | | Purcell | Boyd-Carpenter | Noel-Baker | | | Strickland | | | | | | | | | | Crossman |
| Nuneaton | Maddocks | | | | | Willison | Hope | Smith | | | North | | Fletcher | | | | | | Bowles | | |
| Rugby | Baird | | | | Wallace | A. Brown | Margesson | | | | | | | | | | | | W. Brown | | |
| Tamworth / Sutton Coldfield (1945) | Wilson-Fox | | | Newson | | Iliffe | | | Steel-Maitland | | | Mellor | | | | | | | | | |
| Warwick and Leamington | Pollock | | | | | Eden | | | | | | | | | | | | | | | |
| Solihull | | | | | | | | | | | | | | | | | | | | | Lindsay |
| Birmingham Acock's Green | | | | | | | | | | | | | | | | | | | | | Usborne |
| Coventry West | | | | | | | | | | | | | | | | | | | | | Edelman |

*Transferred from Staffordshire 1911

=== 1950 to 1983 ===
Conservative Independent Labour Liberal

| Constituency | 1950 | 50 | 1951 | 52 | 53 | 1955 | 57 | 1959 | 61 | 63 | 1964 | 65 | 1966 | 67 | 68 | 69 | 1970 | Feb 1974 | Oct 1974 | 76 | 77 | 1979 | 82 |
|---|---|---|---|---|---|---|---|---|---|---|---|---|---|---|---|---|---|---|---|---|---|---|---|
| Birmingham Erdington | Silverman | | | | | | | | | | | | | | | | | Silverman | | | | | |
| Birmingham Aston | Wyatt | | | | | Silverman | | | | | | | | | | | | | | | | | |
| Birmingham Edgbaston | Bennett | | | | Pitt | | | | | | | | Knight | | | | | | | | | | |
| Birmingham Hall Green | Jones | | | | | | | | | | | Eyre | | | | | | | | | | | |
| Birmingham Handsworth | Roberts | Boyle | | | | | | | | | | | | | | | Chapman | Lee | | | | Wright | |
| B'ham King's Norton / B'ham Selly Oak ('55) | Lloyd | | | | | Gurden | | | | | | | | | | | | | Litterick | | | Beaumont-Dark | |
| Birmingham Ladywood | Yates | | | | | | | | | | | | | | | Lawler | Fisher | Walden | | | Sever | | |
| Birmingham Northfield | Blackburn | → | Chapman | | | | | | | | | | | | | | Carter | | | | | Cadbury | Spellar |
| Birmingham Perry Barr | Poole | | | | | Howell | | | | | Davies | | Price | | | | Kinsey | Rooker | | | | | |
| Birmingham Small Heath | Longden | | | Wheeldon | | | | | Howell | | | | | | | | | | | | | | |
| Birmingham Sparkbrook | Shurmer | | | | | | | Seymour | | | Hattersley | | | | | | | | | | | | |
| Birmingham Stechford | Jenkins | | | | | | | | | | | | | | | | | | | | MacKay | Davis | |
| Birmingham Yardley | Usborne | | | | | | | Cleaver | | | Evans | | | | | | Coombs | Tierney | | | | Bevan | |
| Coventry East / Coventry NE (1974) | Crossman | | | | | | | | | | | | | | | | | Park | | | | | |
| Coventry North / Coventry NW (1974) | Edelman | | | | | | | | | | | | | | | | | | | Robinson | | | |
| Coventry South / Coventry SE (1974) | Burton | | | | | | | Hocking | | | Wilson | | | | | | | | | | | | |
| Nuneaton | Bowles | | | | | | | | | | | Cousins | | Huckfield | | | | | | | | | |
| Rugby | Johnson | | | | | | | Wise | | | | | Price | | | | | | | | | Pawsey | |
| Solihull | Lindsay | | | | | | | | | | Grieve | | | | | | | | | | | | |
| Stratford-on-Avon | Profumo | | | | | | | | | Maude | | | | | | | | | | | | | |
| Sutton Coldfield | Mellor | | | | | Lloyd | | | | | | | | | | | | Fowler | | | | | |
| Warwick and Leamington | Eden | | | | | | Hobson | | | | | | | | Smith | | | | | | | | |
| Meriden | | | | | | Moss | | Matthews | | | Rowland | | | | Speed | | | Tomlinson | | | | Mills | |
| Birmingham All Saints | | | | | | Howell | | Hollingworth | | | Walden | | | | | | | | | | | | |
| Coventry South West | | | | | | | | | | | | | | | | | | Wise | | | | Butcher | |

=== 1983 to present ===
Conservative Labour

| Constituency | 1983 | 1987 | 1992 | 95 | 1997 | 2001 | 2005 | 2010 | 2015 | 2017 | 2019 | 2024 |
|---|---|---|---|---|---|---|---|---|---|---|---|---|
| North Warwickshire / N Warks and Bedworth (2024) | Maude | | O'Brien | | | | | Byles | Tracey | | | Taylor |
| Nuneaton | Stevens | | Olner | | | | | Jones | | | | Gosling |
| Rugby and Kenilworth / Kenilworth and Southam (2010) | J. Pawsey | | | | King | | Wright | | | | | |
| Stratford-on-Avon | Howarth | | | → | Maples | | | Zahawi | | | | Perteghella |
| Warwick and Leamington | Smith | | | | Plaskitt | | | White | | Western | | |
| Rugby | | | | | | | | M. Pawsey | | | | Slinger |

== See also ==
- List of parliamentary constituencies in the West Midlands (region)
