= David Verney, 21st Baron Willoughby de Broke =

British politician (born 1938)

The Right Honourable The Lord Willoughby de Broke DL FRSA FRGS
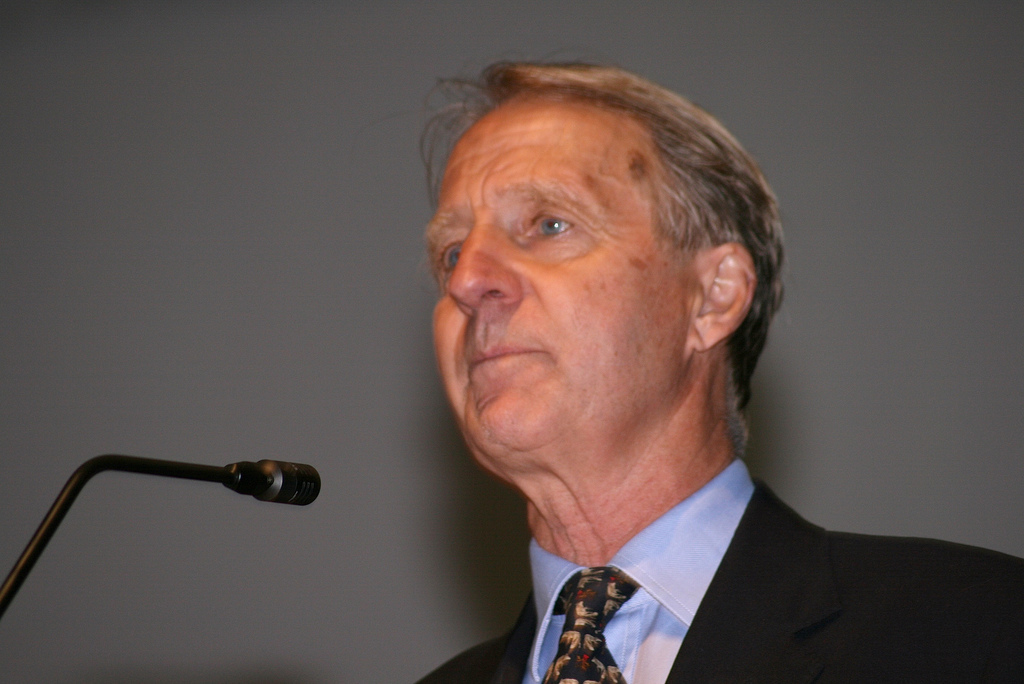

Member of the House of Lords
- Lord Temporal
- Hereditary peerage 9 July 1986 – 11 November 1999
- Preceded by: The 20th Baron Willoughby de Broke
- Succeeded by: Seat abolished
- Elected Hereditary Peer; 11 November 1999 – 9 July 2024
- Election: 1999
- Preceded by: Seat established
- Succeeded by: Seat abolished

Personal details
- Born: Leopold David Verney; 14 September 1938 (age 88)
- Party: Non-affiliated
- Other political affiliations: UKIP (2007–2018); Conservative (until 2007)
- Spouse(s): Petra Aird (m. 1965; div. 1989) Alexandra du Luart (m. 2003)
- Children: 2
- Education: New College, Oxford

Leopold David Verney, 21st Baron Willoughby de Broke, DL, FRSA, FRGS (born 14 September 1938), is a British hereditary peer and former member of the House of Lords.

== Early life ==
Leopold David Verney, 21st Baron Willoughby de Broke, was born on 14 September 1938. He is the only son of John Verney, 20th Baron Willoughby de Broke and Rachel Wrey. His paternal grandparents were Richard Verney, 19th Baron Willoughby de Broke and Marie Frances Lisette Hanbury. Verney was educated at Le Rosey in Switzerland and at New College, Oxford where he studied modern languages (BA, then Oxbridge MA).

== Career ==
He inherited his father's title in 1986 and was one of the 90 hereditary peers elected to remain in the House of Lords after the passing of the House of Lords Act 1999; originally elected a Conservative peer, he defected to the UK Independence Party (UKIP) in January 2007, making him one of only four UKIP members at Westminster.

Since 1992, he has been Chairman of the St Martin's Theatre Company Ltd. - the building of the St Martin's Theatre was commissioned by his grandfather. From 1999 to 2004, he was President of the Heart of England Tourist Board.

From 1990 to 2004, Willoughby de Broke was Patron of the Warwickshire Association of Boys' Clubs and from 2005 to the present has been Chairman of the Warwickshire Hunt. Since 2002 he has been a governor of the Royal Shakespeare Theatre and also since 2002 the president of the Warwickshire branch of the Campaign to Protect Rural England. He is a Fellow of the Royal Society of Arts (FRSA) and of the Royal Geographical Society (FRGS).

On 19 November 2009, Willoughby de Broke introduced the Constitutional Reform Bill 2009–10 into the House of Lords, with clauses to repeal the European Communities Act 1972 and the Human Rights Act 1998, to reduce the powers of the House of Commons and government, to reduce MPs' pay, and to give more power to local authorities.

On 29 May 2012, Willoughby de Broke introduced the Referendum (European Union) Bill 2012–13 to the House of Lords, to make provision for the holding of a referendum on the United Kingdom's continued membership of the European Union, on the same day as the next General Election.

He left UKIP in the autumn of 2018. On 9 July 2024, his membership of the House of Lords was revoked under the terms of the House of Lords Reform Act 2014, due to non-attendance for a whole session, triggering a by-election to replace him.

== Personal life ==
He married Petra Aird, the daughter of Colonel Sir John Renton Aird, Bart., in 1965. They divorced in 1989, and in 2003 he married secondly Alexandra "Min" du Luart, only daughter of Sir Adam Butler and a granddaughter of one-time Deputy Prime Minister Rab Butler. He has two sons by his first marriage, Rupert and John Verney, and two stepdaughters.

The heir apparent to the title is his elder son, the Hon Rupert Greville Verney (born 1966).

Peerage of England
Preceded by John Verney	Baron Willoughby de Broke; 1986–present Member of the House of Lords (1986–1999)	Incumbent
Parliament of the United Kingdom
New office created by the House of Lords Act 1999	Elected hereditary peer to the House of Lords under the House of Lords Act 1999; 1999–2024	Vacant
