= Kettleburgh =

Village in Suffolk, England

Coordinates: 52°11′N 1°19′E

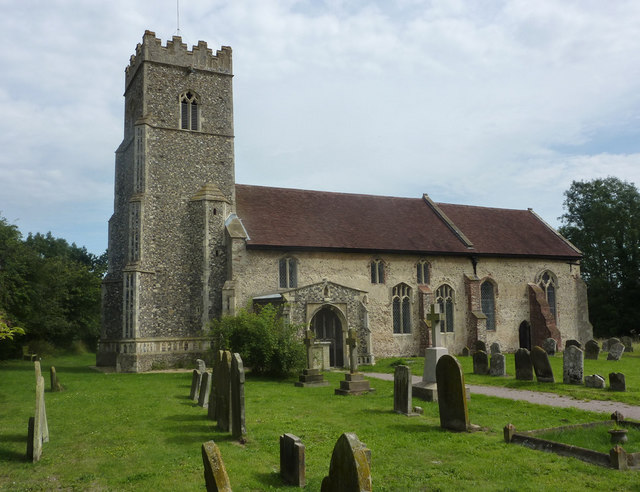
- Church of St Andrew, Kettleburgh

- Location within Suffolk
- Area: 5.87 km^{2} (2.27 sq mi)
- Population: 231 (2011)
  - Density: 39/km^{2} (100/sq mi)
- OS grid reference: TM265603
- District: East Suffolk
- Shire county: Suffolk
- Region: East
- Country: England
- Sovereign state: United Kingdom
- Post town: WOODBRIDGE
- Postcode district: IP13
- Dialling code: 01728
- Police: Suffolk
- Fire: Suffolk
- Ambulance: East of England
- UK Parliament: Central Suffolk and North Ipswich

Kettleburgh is a small village and civil parish in the East Suffolk district, in the county of Suffolk. The population of this Civil Parish at the 2011 Census was 231.

It is near the small towns of Wickham Market and Framlingham in the valley of the River Deben.

The grade I listed church of St Andrew dates from the 14th century and was restored in 1890. The village also has a pub.

== Notable residents ==
- Corrie Grant (1850–1924), journalist, barrister and Liberal Party politician who served as the Member of Parliament (MP) for the Rugby division of Warwickshire from 1900 to 1910.
