= George Francis Sawyer =

George Francis Sawyer (1871–27 August 1960) was Labour MP for Birmingham Duddeston.

Born in Cuddesdon in Oxfordshire, Sawyer worked as a railway guard, and joined the National Union of Railwaymen. He was active in the Labour Party, and was elected to Birmingham City Council.

Sawyer stood unsuccessfully in the Birmingham Duddeston seat in 1923 and 1924, finally winning it from the Conservatives in 1929. In 1931, the Conservatives regained the seat, and Sawyer was again unsuccessful in 1935.

Parliament of the United Kingdom
Preceded by John Burman	Member of Parliament for Birmingham Duddeston; 1929 – 1931	Succeeded by Oliver Simmonds
