= Simon Goldblatt =

British politician (1928–2021)

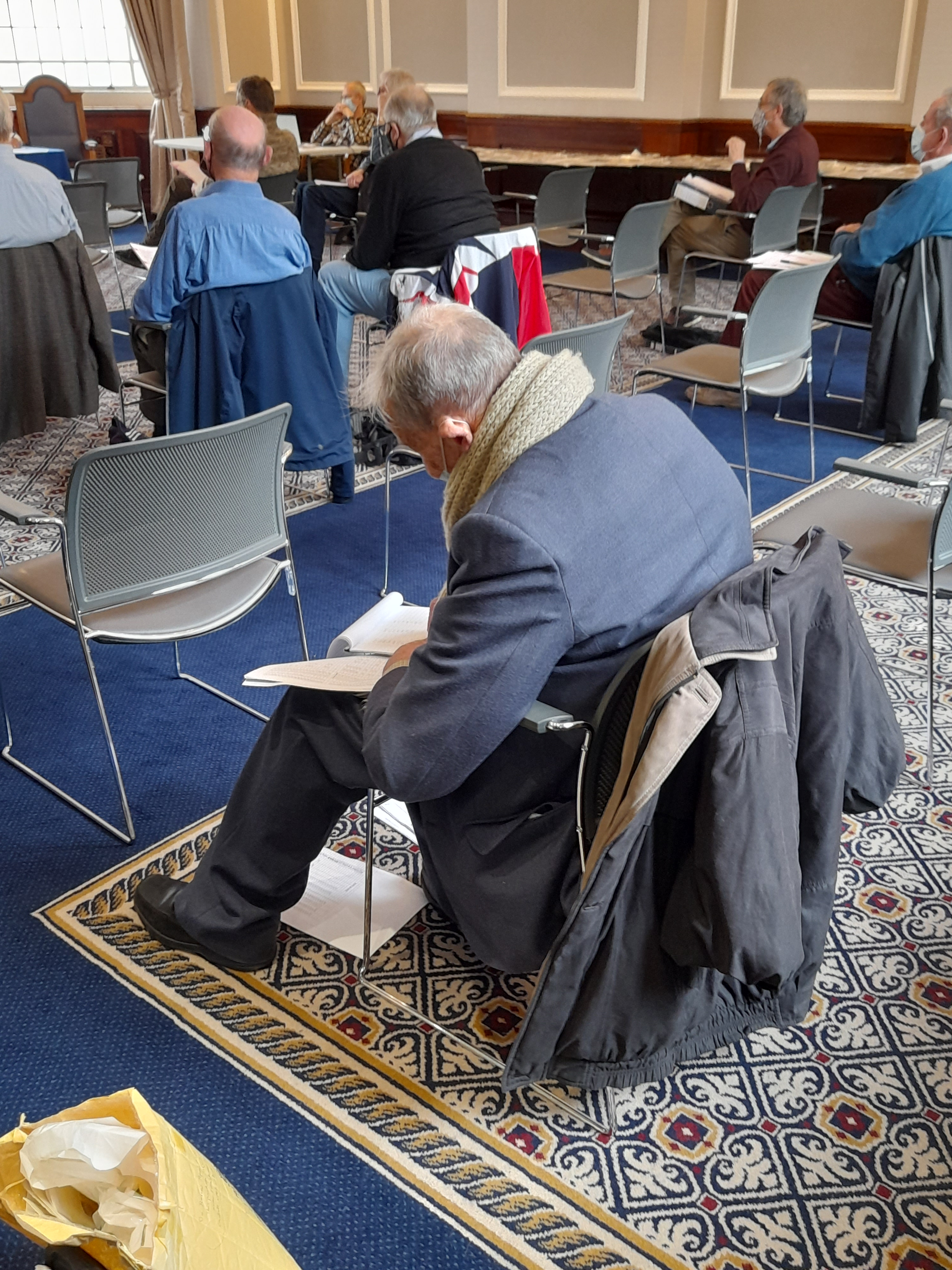
Simon Goldblatt at the British West Indies Study Circle club stamp auction, held at the Royal Philatelic Society London, 22 May 2021.

Simon Goldblatt QC (24 December 1928 – 2 November 2021) was a British Barrister, Liberal Party politician, philatelist, and pedagogue.

== Background ==
Simon Goldblatt was born in 1928. He was educated at Eton College, going up in 1941 as one of the few Jewish boys in attendance and ending his time there as captain of the school. He then studied the law tripos at Trinity Hall, Cambridge, graduating with a first-class degree in the subject in 1950.

== Professional career ==
Goldblatt was called to the Bar in 1953. He joined chambers soon thereafter. He took silk in 1972 (having effectively been positively invited to do so by the appellate committee of the House of Lords, one of whose members had commented in one case that they "took it most ill that submissions of that calibre come otherwise than from the front bench"), and was made a Bencher in 1982.

He was head of chambers at Essex Chambers from 1983 until 1986. He continued to practise there alongside occasional stints as a Deputy High Court Judge, where he had a tendency to find alternative paths to correct jurisprudence to those presented to him by counsel. He was still attending chambers daily, up to some weeks before his death. His personal interests included foreign travel, philately, and porcelain.

== Political career ==
Goldblatt was President of the West Midlands Young Liberals Federation, and was a Member of the Liberal Party Council. He was the Liberal candidate for the Rugby division of Warwickshire at the 1959 and 1964 General Elections, and for the Twickenham division of Middlesex at the 1966 General Election. He did not stand for parliament again.

=== Election results ===
General Election 1959: Rugby
Party	Candidate	Votes	%	±%
Conservative	Roy Wise	17,429	42.6	−4.0
Labour	James Johnson	16,959	41.4	−8.7
Liberal	Simon Goldblatt	6,413	15.7	N/A
Independent	Archibald S. Frost	142	0.4	N/A
Majority		470	1.2	−2.3
Turnout		40,924	85.6	+0.2
Conservative gain from Labour		Swing		

General Election 1964: Rugby
Party	Candidate	Votes	%	±%
Conservative	Alfred Roy Wise	19,221	45.1	+2.5
Labour	David H. Childs	17,532	41.2	−0.2
Liberal	Simon Goldblatt	5,522	13.0	−2.7
Social Credit Party	Archibald S. Frost	304	0.7	N/A
Majority		1,689	4.0	+2.8
Turnout		42,580	84.6	−1.0
Conservative hold		Swing		

General Election 1966: Twickenham
Party	Candidate	Votes	%	±%
Conservative	Roger Gresham Cooke	26,512	47.7	
Labour	David Carlton	18,884	34.0	
Liberal	Simon Goldblatt	10,160	18.3	
Majority		7,628	13.7	
Turnout		55,556	78.6	
Conservative hold		Swing		

== See also ==
- Rugby (UK Parliament constituency)
- Twickenham (UK Parliament constituency)
