= John Slinger =

British politician

John Slinger MP
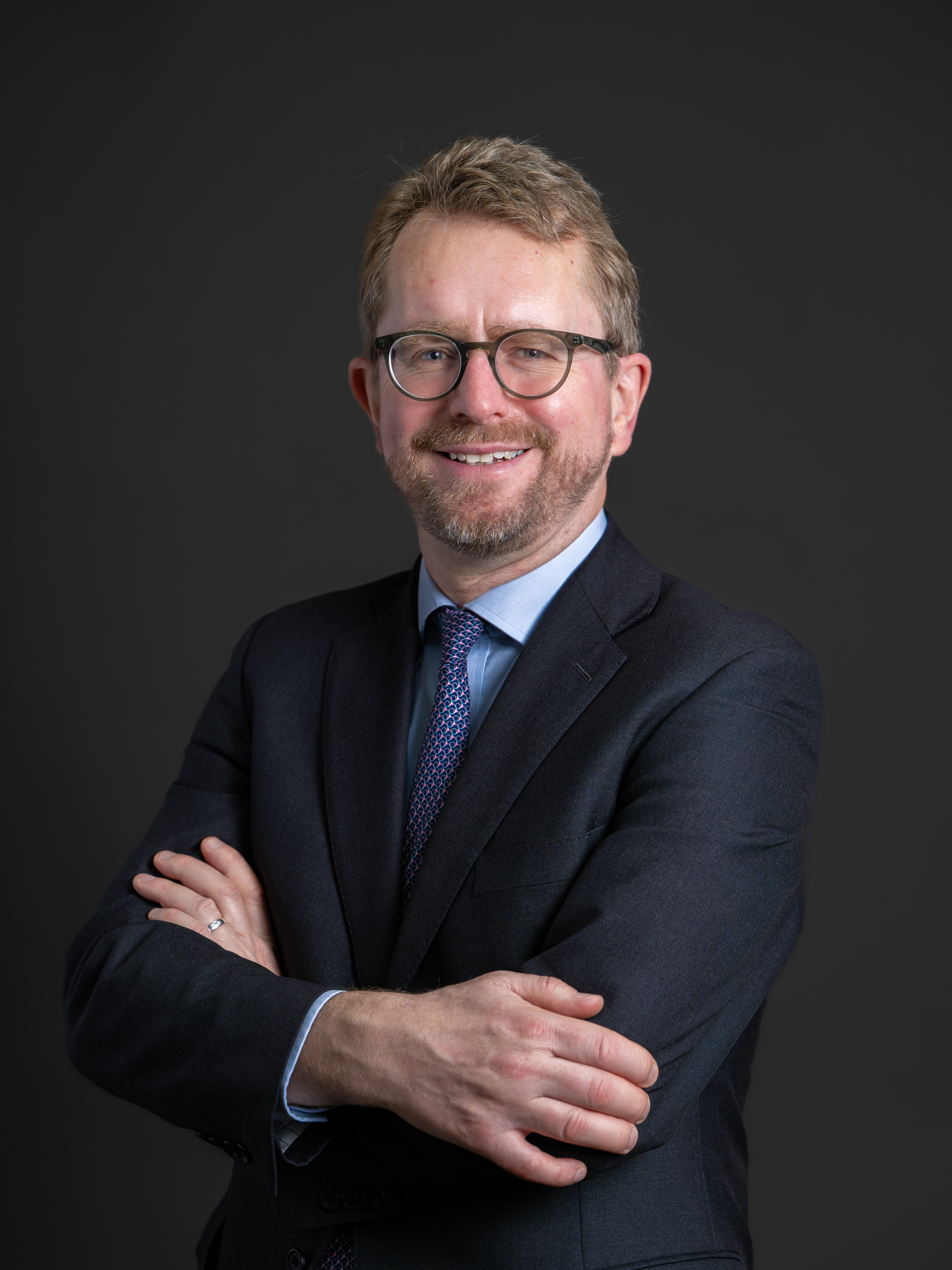
- Official portrait, 2026

Member of Parliament for Rugby
- Incumbent
- Assumed office 4 July 2024
- Preceded by: Mark Pawsey
- Majority: 4,428 (9.1%)

Personal details
- Born: January 1975 (age 51) Manchester, England
- Party: Labour
- Education: Durham University

John Anthony Slinger (born January 1975) is a British Labour politician who has served as the Member of Parliament for Rugby since 2024.

== Life and early career ==
Slinger was born in Manchester, and grew up in Gloucestershire. He joined the Labour Party in 1992 at the age of 17. He studied at Durham University and was formerly a partner at strategic communications company Consulum, founded by former employees of lobbying firm Bell Pottinger. According to his LinkedIn page, he has also worked for Tony Blair Associates, as a researcher for Ann Clwyd and Julia Drown, and was in rock bands in Leeds.

Slinger moved to Rugby in 2006, and became a governor of Northlands Primary School and a trustee of Warwickshire Young Carers. He later served as a councillor on Rugby Borough Council, representing the ward of New Bilton. He was selected as Labour's candidate for Rugby in 2023.

== Parliamentary career ==
Slinger was elected in the 2024 election, winning the seat from the Conservatives, with a majority of 4,428. He became the first Labour MP to represent Rugby since Andy King, between 1997 and 2005.

In April 2026, Slinger was appointed as the UK Government's Trade Envoy to South Korea. In September 2025, he was the only Labour MP to speak in an emergency debate on the Mandelson/Epstein scandal. In June 2026, he called for a full contest in the leadership election following the resignation of Keir Starmer.
