= Ernest Hiley =

Sir Ernest Varvill Hiley, KBE (1868–1949) was Conservative MP for Birmingham Duddeston

Originally a solicitor, he was town clerk of Leicester and Birmingham. He was knighted in 1917.

He was elected as an MP in 1922 but stood down in 1923, an unusually short term.

He later served on two Royal Commissions.

== Sources ==
Parliament of the United Kingdom
Preceded by Eldred Hallas	Member of Parliament for Birmingham Duddeston; 1922 – 1923	Succeeded by John Burman
