= Mark Pawsey =

British politician

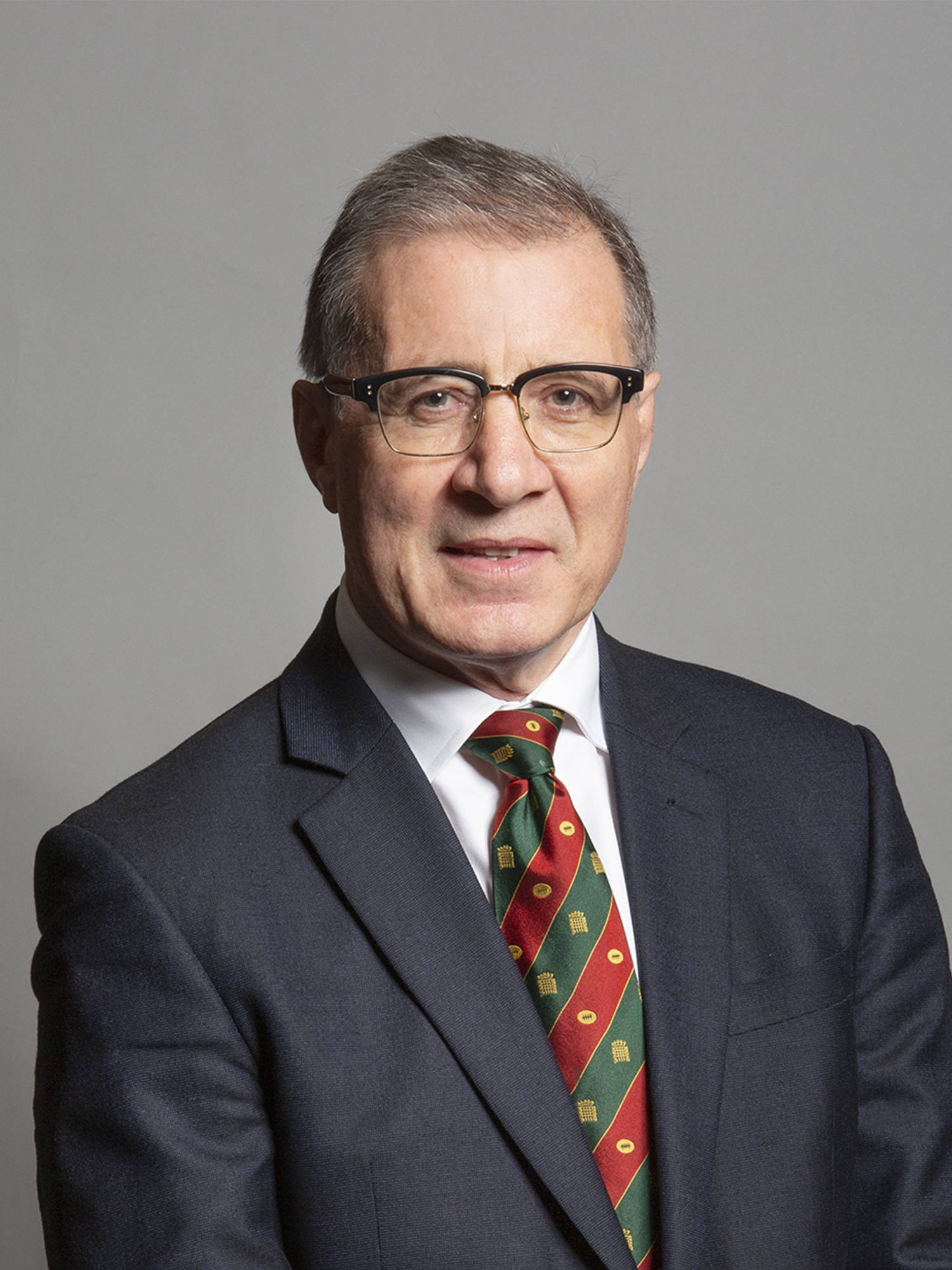

Member of Parliament for Rugby
- In office 6 May 2010 – 30 May 2024
- Preceded by: Constituency re-established
- Succeeded by: John Slinger

Personal details
- Born: Mark Julian Francis Pawsey; 16 January 1957 (age 69) Binley Woods, Warwickshire, England
- Party: Conservative
- Relations: Jim Pawsey (father)
- Education: Reading University
- Profession: Businessman
- Website: www.markpawsey.org.uk

Mark Julian Francis Pawsey (born 16 January 1957) is a British politician who served as the Member of Parliament (MP) for Rugby from the 2010 general election until stepping down at the 2024 general election. He is a member of the Conservative Party.

His father, Jim Pawsey, was the MP for Rugby from 1979 to 1983 and then for Rugby and Kenilworth until 1997, when he lost the seat in the general election to Labour's Andy King.

On 5 December 2022 Pawsey announced his intention not to stand for re-election in the 2024 general election.

== Education and early career ==
Mark Pawsey grew up in Binley Woods, Warwickshire, England, and was educated at Lawrence Sheriff School in Rugby. He later attended the University of Reading, where he earned a degree in estate management. In 1982, he founded a company with his brother, supplying products to the catering trade, which was later bought by an FTSE 100 company.

== Local government ==
Pawsey was elected as a Councillor for the Conservative Party for Dunchurch and Knightlow on the Rugby Borough Council in 2002. He served on planning, borough development and housing panels and was portfolio holder and cabinet member for Housing.

== House of Commons ==
Pawsey resigned from his position as a councillor upon selection in January 2007 for the new parliamentary constituency of Rugby and was a member of the A-List. Pawsey was first elected to the House of Commons in 2010 for Rugby with a majority of 6,000 votes; in this contest he defeated Andy King, who had unseated his father as MP for Rugby and Kenilworth in 1997. He was reelected in 2015 and 2017 with majorities of 10,345 and 8,212.

Pawsey served on the Communities and Local Government Committee, having taken over from George Freeman, between 2010 and 2015. He was also a member of the Public Bill Committee for the Defence Reform Act 2014 and has been a member of the all-party groups on manufacturing, microbusinesses, packaging, small business, sewers and sewerage and rugby union. He played for the Lords & Commons rugby club and is currently also secretary of the All-Party Parliamentary Group on Speedway Racing.

In December 2012, Pawsey spoke out against allowing same sex people to marry by suggesting that it may lead to lower levels of heterosexual people getting married. He said in the House of Commons: "Given that marriage rates in Spain and Holland collapsed after the introduction of same-sex marriage, does she [Maria Miller] not fear that in this country even fewer couples intending to have children will choose to marry?" Research later showed that Pawsey's evidence base for making his suggestion was problematic.

Since becoming an MP Pawsey has campaigned against various measures to limit the tobacco industry. In 2012 Pawsey set up, and became chair, of the All Party Parliamentary Group (APPG) for the Packaging Manufacturing Industry, with one of objectives of this APPG is "to address issues facing the industry from regulation".

Pawsey was opposed to Brexit prior to the 2016 referendum.

In July 2017, Pawsey was accused of hypocrisy by opponents after he voted against an Opposition Party amendment to end a below inflation public sector pay cap – one week after saying concerns over wages needed to be addressed in a letter to his local newspaper. Pawsey defended voting against Labour's amendment, stating: "It was gesture politics by Labour as this was not a vote on primary legislation."

In 2017, he said that he would support repealing the ban on fox hunting.

== Personal life ==
He is married to Tracy and they live in the village of Grandborough, Warwickshire, and London. They have four children.

== See also ==
- Rugby, Warwickshire
- Conservative Party
- Rugby Constituency

Parliament of the United Kingdom
New constituency	Member of Parliament for Rugby; 2010–2024	Succeeded by John Slinger
