= John Verney, 20th Baron Willoughby de Broke =

British peer

Lord Willoughby de Broke

Air Commodore John Henry Peyto Verney, 20th Baron Willoughby de Broke, MC, AFC (21 May 1896, London – 25 May 1986) was a British peer.

== Background and education ==
The son of Richard Verney, 19th Baron Willoughby de Broke, and Marie Frances Lisette Hanbury, Verney was educated at the Royal Military College, Sandhurst. He succeeded his father in 1923.

== Military career ==
During the First World War, he was awarded the Military Cross (1918). At the end of hostilities, he became aide-de-camp to the Governor of Bombay, Sir George Lloyd, from 1919 to 1922 and adjutant of the Warwickshire Yeomanry from 1925 to 1929. In 1939 he was appointed Lord Lieutenant of Warwickshire, a post he held until 1967. Between the wars both Lord and Lady Willoughby were keen aviators with their own aeroplane and private aerodrome at their home in Kineton, Warwickshire.

He was also Commanding Officer from 1936 to 1939 of the 605 County of Warwick squadron. In a memoir, Peter Townsend (noted Battle of Britain pilot and, post-war, romantically linked with Princess Margaret), recounts 605's arrival at RAF Tangmere, just before the outbreak of war. Townsend says that

Things hummed at Tangmere Cottage, just opposite the guard room, where John and Rachel Willoughby kept open house. There we spent wild evenings, drinking, singing, dancing to romantic tunes . . . we danced blithely, relentlessly towards catastrophe. . . . With one chance in five of survival - not counting the burnt and the wounded - only a handful of us would come through [i.e., survive to the end of World War II].

During the Second World War, he was a Duty Controller in the No. 11 Group Operations Room at RAF Uxbridge, responsible for the fighter protection of the south-east (when he was mentioned in despatches) and then became Deputy Director of Public Relations at the Air Ministry (1941–44) and Director from 1945 to 1946.

== Other ==
Joint Master of the Warwickshire Hounds (1929–35) and chairman of the Wolverhampton Racecourse Company (1947–71), he was also President of the Hunters' Improvement Society (1957–58).

== Family ==
On 4 October 1933 Lord Willoughby de Broke married Rachel Wrey (1911-1991), daughter of Sir (Robert) Bourchier Sherard Wrey, 11th Baronet (1855-1917) of Tawstock in Devon and Lutterworth in Leicestershire. They had two children:

- David Verney, 21st Baron Willoughby de Broke (born 1938)
- The Honourable Susan Geraldine Verney (born 1942).

Honorary titles
| Preceded by Lord Henry Charles Seymour | Lord Lieutenant of Warwickshire; 1939–1968 | Succeeded by Charles Smith-Ryland |
| Preceded by P.L.M. Wright | Honorary Colonel of The Warwickshire Yeomanry; 1942–1956 | Succeeded by (regiment amalgamated) |
| Preceded by (regiment formed) | Honorary Colonel of The Queen's Own Warwickshire and Worcestershire Yeomanry; 1956–1963 | Succeeded by The Viscount Cobham |
Peerage of England
| Preceded by Richard Greville Verney | Baron Willoughby de Broke; 1923–1986 | Succeeded by Leopold David Verney |
