= Charles Addington Hanbury =

English brewer (c.1828-1900)

- Born: 1828
- Died: 1900 (aged 71–72)
- Occupation: Brewer

Charles Addington Hanbury DL JP (c. 1828 – 13 December 1900) was an English brewer from the Hanbury brewing family and a master of the Brewers' Company in 1857.

== Family ==
Hanbury was born in Upper Clapton, Hackney, London, to Robert Hanbury, a partner in the brewers Truman, Hanbury, Buxton & Co., where he worked for over 50 years, and his wife, Emily Hall Hanbury.

In 1853, he married Christine Isabella MacKenzie in Inverness, Scotland. One of their sons was the geographer, traveller and author, David Theophilus Hanbury, and their daughter Marie Frances Lisette Hanbury married the peer and conservative politician Richard Verney, 19th Baron Willoughby de Broke.

== Career ==
In 1859, Hanbury was commissioned as a lieutenant in the 12th Middlesex Rifle Volunteers, a unit got up by Wilbraham Taylor of Hadley Hurst, a gentleman usher to Queen Victoria who became a captain in the unit. They had premises in High Street, Barnet. Around 1861, he bought Mount Pleasant in East Barnet.

The London Metropolitan Archives contain a number of leases entered into by Hanbury in the 1880s on behalf of Truman, Hanbury, Buxton & Co. By 1869, he was a member of the Brick Lane Establishment.

== Death ==
Hanbury died in a riding accident in 1900 when he was thrown from his horse and broke his neck while hunting with the Warwickshire Hounds at Grandborough near Rugby.
