= Rugby (constituency) =

UK Parliament constituency (1885–1983, 2010 onwards)

Coordinates: 52.24°N 1.98°W

- County constituency for the House of Commons
- Interactive map of boundaries since 2024
- Boundary of Rugby in West Midlands region
- County: Warwickshire
- Electorate: 72,603 (2023)
- Major settlements: Rugby, Bulkington

Current constituency
- Created: 2010
- Member of Parliament: John Slinger (Labour Party)
- Seats: One
- Created from: Rugby & Kenilworth

1885–1983
- Seats: One
- Created from: North Warwickshire
- Replaced by: Rugby & Kenilworth and Nuneaton

Rugby (referred to by local political parties as Rugby and Bulkington) is a constituency (Note: A county constituency (for the purposes of election expenses and type of returning officer)) represented in the House of Commons of the UK Parliament since 2024 by John Slinger, of the Labour Party. (Note: As with all constituencies, the constituency elects one Member of Parliament (MP) by the first past the post system of election at least every five years.)

== Constituency profile ==
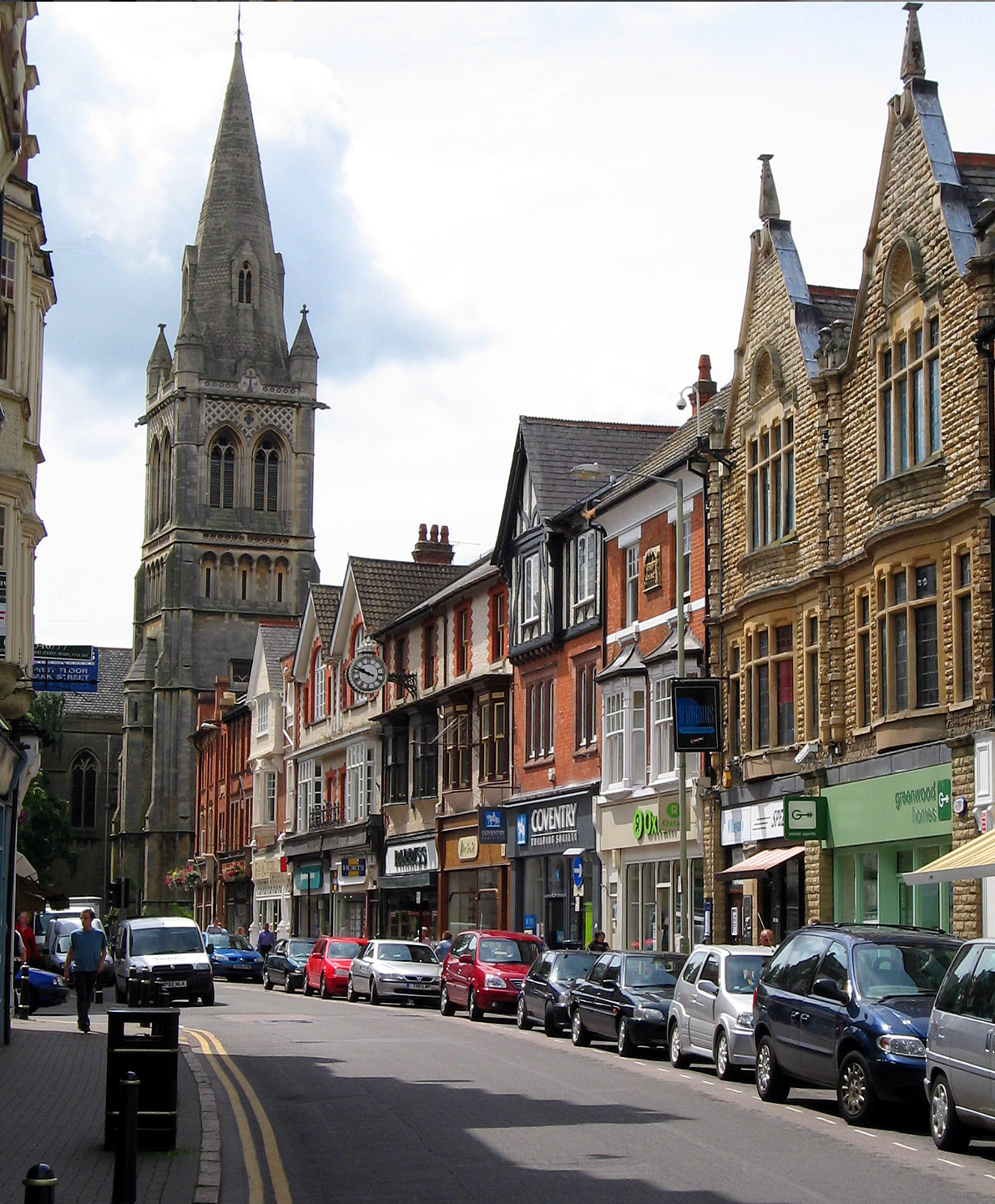
Regent Street, Rugby

Rugby is a constituency in Warwickshire in the West Midlands region of England, mostly within the Borough of Rugby and partly within the Nuneaton and Bedworth district. Its main settlement is the town of Rugby, which has a population of around 84,000. The constituency also covers a rural area north and west of the town including the villages of Cawston, Long Lawford, Wolston, Binley Woods and Bulkington.

Rugby is a large market town located around 11 miles (18 km) east of the city of Coventry. Known as the birthplace of rugby football, the town was a small, rural settlement until it became an important railway town in the mid-19th century. As a result, Rugby grew into a significant centre for engineering and logistics. There is deprivation, particularly in the town centre, which has a high quantity of dense terraced housing. Some of the town's outer suburbs are more affluent with many large detached homes. House prices are generally higher than the rest of the West Midlands but lower than the UK average.

The constituency generally comes out average for many points of demography and socioeconomic measures. Rugby has an above-average population of working-age adults with families and a low proportion of young adults. Residents have above-average levels of income and homeownership and the child poverty rate is slightly lower than the national average. They have average levels of education and a high proportion work in the manufacturing, science and transport sectors. The percentage of residents claiming unemployment benefits is also just below average. White people made up 86% of the population at the 2021 census.

At the local council level, the centre and north of Rugby are mostly represented by Labour Party councillors and the south of the town by Liberal Democrats. The rural areas mostly elected Conservatives. An estimated 58% of voters in Rugby supported leaving the European Union in the 2016 referendum, higher than the UK-wide rate of 52%.

== History ==
In its early history, Rugby was a marginal seat between the Liberals and Conservatives, before becoming a safer seat for the latter until the Second World War, when it was gained by an independent candidate.

Between 1950 and 1979 however, it was a consistent Labour-Conservative marginal, often bucking the national swing (for example, William Price held the seat for Labour with an increased majority in 1970 while the Wilson government was defeated).

Since its recreation in 2010, the seat produced solid Conservative majorities for Mark Pawsey until 2024, when it was won for Labour by John Slinger.

== Boundaries and boundary changes ==
Map of boundaries 2010-2024

1885–1918: When first created in 1885, the Rugby division consisted of the Petty Sessional Divisions of Rugby, Southam, Burton Dassett and Kington, and Kenilworth except the parishes of Lillington and Milverton. The division as recommended by the Boundary Commissioners had a population of 49,291 in the 1881 Census.

1918–1945: Boundary changes in 1918 expanded the constituency to the south, while removing some areas near Leamington Spa. The constituency was defined as consisting of the Urban District of Rugby, the Rural Districts of Farnborough, Monks Kirby, Rugby and Southam, together with the majority of Brailes Rural district (excepting only the two parishes of Ilmington and Stretton-on-Fosse which were in a detached part of Warwickshire). Finally, the division included several parishes which were in the east of Stratford-on-Avon Rural District: Charlcote, Combrook, Compton Verney, Eatington, Kineton, Loxley, Moreton Morrell, Newbold Pacey, Wellesbourne Hastings and Wellesbourne Mountford.

1945–1950: When changes were made to constituency boundaries in 1945 to split up some extremely large constituencies, Rugby was affected by the recommendations made as a result of the growth in electorate in the Coventry constituency. It gained some areas to the east of Coventry which had already been added to Rugby Rural District but were previously part of Nuneaton division. This change added about 2,000 voters.

1950–1983: The constituency was considerably reduced in area in boundary changes which came into effect in 1950, being reduced to simply the Municipal Borough of Rugby and the Rural District of Rugby. No alteration in boundaries was made as part of the First Periodical Review of Boundaries in 1954, and in the Second Periodical Review which came into effect in 1974, the definition remained the same although changes in local government boundaries under The West Midlands Order 1965 and The Coventry Order 1965 meant that a minor change was made.

The Third Periodical Review of constituency boundaries expanded the Rugby constituency to the west. The constituency lost 6,545 of its 60,909 electors, in and around the villages of Ansty and Wolvey, to Nuneaton. It then gained 16,600 electors from Kenilworth, resulting in its renaming as Rugby and Kenilworth.

2010–2024: Under the Fifth Periodic Review of Westminster constituencies the Boundary Commission re-established the constituency of Rugby for the 2010 general election as a consequence of the creation of the new constituency of Kenilworth and Southam and the abolition of Rugby and Kenilworth. It had similar boundaries to the 1950-1983 version, containing the following electoral wards:

- Admirals; Avon and Swift; Benn; Bilton; Brownsover North; Brownsover South; Caldecott; Earl Craven and Wolston; Eastlands; Fosse; Hillmorton; Lawford and King's Newnham; New Bilton; Newbold; Overslade; Paddox; Wolvey in Rugby Borough
- Bulkington in the Borough of Nuneaton and Bedworth.

2024–present: Further to the 2023 Periodic Review of Westminster constituencies which came into force for the 2024 general election, the constituency saw very small changes to align boundaries with those of revised wards in the Borough of Rugby; it is defined as being composed of the following (as they existed on 1 December 2020):

- The Borough of Nuneaton and Bedworth ward of Bulkington.
- The Borough of Rugby wards of: Admirals and Cawston; Benn; Bilton; Clifton, Newton and Churchover; Coton and Boughton; Eastlands; Hillmorton; New Bilton; Newbold and Brownsover; Paddox; Revel and Binley Woods; Rokeby and Overslade; Wolston and the Lawfords; Wolvey and Shilton.

== Members of Parliament ==
=== MPs 1885–1983 ===
Event	Member	Party
1885	Henry Peyton Cobb	Liberal
1895	Richard Verney (Note: Before birthright succession to the Lords as Baron Willoughby de Broke)	Conservative
1900	Corrie Grant	Liberal
Jan 1910	John Baird	Conservative
1922	Euan Wallace	Conservative
1923	Ernest Brown	Liberal
1924	David Margesson	Conservative
1942 by-election	William Brown	Independent
1950	James Johnson	Labour
1959	Roy Wise	Conservative
1966	William Price	Labour
1979	Jim Pawsey	Conservative
1983	constituency abolished	

=== MPs since 2010 ===
Election	Member	Party
2010	Mark Pawsey	Conservative
2024	John Slinger	Labour

== Elections ==
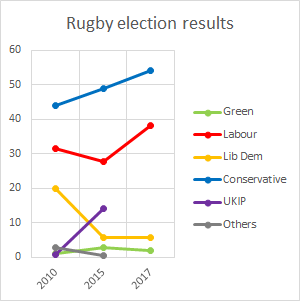
Rugby election history

=== Elections in the 2020s ===
General election 2024: Rugby
Party	Candidate	Votes	%	±%
Labour	John Slinger	19,533	39.9	+8.8
Conservative	Yousef Dahmash	15,105	30.8	−26.5
Reform	Devenne Kedward	8,225	16.8	N/A
Liberal Democrats	Richard Dickson	3,252	6.6	−1.7
Green	Becca Stevenson	2,556	5.2	+1.9
Independent	Mark Townsend	215	0.4	N/A
Independent	Anand Swayamprakasam	118	0.2	N/A
Majority		4,428	9.1	N/A
Turnout		49,004	65.4	−4.8
Labour gain from Conservative		Swing	+17.6	

=== Elections in the 2010s ===
General election 2019: Rugby
Party	Candidate	Votes	%	±%
Conservative	Mark Pawsey	29,255	57.6	+3.3
Labour	Debbie Bannagan	15,808	31.1	−7.2
Liberal Democrats	Rana Das-Gupta	4,207	8.3	+2.7
Green	Rebecca Stevenson	1,544	3.0	+1.1
Majority		13,447	26.5	+10.5
Turnout		50,814	70.2	−0.9
Conservative hold		Swing	+5.3	

General election 2017: Rugby
Party	Candidate	Votes	%	±%
Conservative	Mark Pawsey	27,872	54.3	+5.2
Labour	Claire Edwards	19,660	38.3	+10.4
Liberal Democrats	Jerry Roodhouse	2,851	5.6	−0.2
Green	Graham Bliss	953	1.9	−1.0
Majority		8,212	16.0	−5.2
Turnout		51,336	71.1	+1.0
Conservative hold		Swing	-2.6	

General election 2015: Rugby
Party	Candidate	Votes	%	±%
Conservative	Mark Pawsey	24,040	49.1	+5.1
Labour	Claire Edwards	13,695	27.9	−3.5
UKIP	Gordon Davies	6,855	14.0	+13.1
Liberal Democrats	Ed Goncalves	2,776	5.8	−14.1
Green	Terry White	1,415	2.9	+1.9
TUSC	Peter McLaren	225	0.5	New
Majority		10,345	21.2	+8.6
Turnout		49,006	70.1	+1.2
Conservative hold		Swing	+4.25	

General election 2010: Rugby
Party	Candidate	Votes	%	±%
Conservative	Mark Pawsey	20,901	44.0	
Labour	Andy King	14,901	31.4	
Liberal Democrats	Jerry Roodhouse	9,434	19.9	
BNP	Mark Badrick	1,375	2.9	
Green	Roy Sandison	451	1.0	
UKIP	Barry Milford	406	0.9	
Majority		6,000	12.6	
Turnout		47,468	68.9	
Conservative win (new seat)				

== Election results 1885-1983 ==
=== Elections in the 1880s ===
General election 1885: Rugby
Party	Candidate	Votes	%	±%
Liberal	Henry Peyton Cobb	4,877	58.0	
Conservative	James Darlington	3,533	42.0	
Majority		1,344	16.0	
Turnout		8,410	86.7	
Registered electors		9,700		
Liberal win (new seat)				

General election 1886: Rugby
Party	Candidate	Votes	%	±%
Liberal	Henry Peyton Cobb	4,006	53.2	−4.8
Liberal Unionist	Marston Clarke Buszard	3,528	46.8	+4.8
Majority		478	6.4	−9.6
Turnout		7,534	77.0	−9.0
Registered electors		9,700		
Liberal hold		Swing	−4.8	

=== Elections in the 1890s ===
General election 1892: Rugby
Party	Candidate	Votes	%	±%
Liberal	Henry Peyton Cobb	4,519	54.1	+0.9
Conservative	William Johnson Galloway	3,831	45.9	−0.9
Majority		688	8.2	+1.8
Turnout		8,350	85.3	+8.3
Registered electors		9,785		
Liberal hold		Swing	+0.9	

General election 1895: Rugby
Party	Candidate	Votes	%	±%
Conservative	Richard Verney	4,354	51.7	+5.8
Liberal	Corrie Grant	4,070	48.3	−5.8
Majority		284	3.4	N/A
Turnout		8,424	86.2	+0.9
Registered electors		9,777		
Conservative gain from Liberal		Swing	+5.8	

=== Elections in the 1900s ===
General election 1900: Rugby
Party	Candidate	Votes	%	±%
Liberal	Corrie Grant	4,349	51.3	+3.0
Conservative	F. E. Muntz	4,130	48.7	−3.0
Majority		219	2.6	N/A
Turnout		8,479	82.4	−3.8
Registered electors		10,284		
Liberal gain from Conservative		Swing	+3.0	

General election 1906: Rugby
Party	Candidate	Votes	%	±%
Liberal	Corrie Grant	5,181	51.3	0.0
Conservative	Arthur Steel-Maitland	4,909	48.7	0.0
Majority		272	2.6	0.0
Turnout		10,090	88.1	+5.7
Registered electors		11,451		
Liberal hold		Swing	+0.0	

=== Elections in the 1910s ===
General election January 1910: Rugby
Party	Candidate	Votes	%	±%
Conservative	John Baird	6,191	55.4	+6.7
Liberal	Rupert Scott	4,986	44.6	−6.7
Majority		1,205	10.8	N/A
Turnout		11,177	91.1	+3.0
Registered electors		12,275		
Conservative gain from Liberal		Swing	+6.7	

General election December 1910: Rugby
Party	Candidate	Votes	%	±%
Conservative	John Baird	5,712	53.6	−1.8
Liberal	A. F. B. Williams	4,941	46.4	+1.8
Majority		771	7.2	−3.6
Turnout		10,653	86.8	−4.3
Registered electors		12,275		
Conservative hold		Swing	−1.8	

General election 1918: Rugby
Party		Candidate	Votes	%	±%
C	Unionist	John Baird	11,325	60.5	+6.9
	Liberal	Oscar Frederick Maclagan	7,399	39.5	−6.9
Majority			3,926	21.0	+13.8
Turnout			18,724	59.0	−27.8
Registered electors			31,726		
	Unionist hold		Swing	+6.9	
C indicates candidate endorsed by the coalition government.

=== Elections in the 1920s ===
General election 1922: Rugby
Party	Candidate	Votes	%	±%
Unionist	Euan Wallace	11,934	47.6	−12.9
Liberal	George Peel	8,196	32.7	−6.8
Labour	T H Holt-Hughes	4,940	19.7	New
Majority		3,738	14.9	−6.1
Turnout		25,070	76.9	+17.9
Registered electors		32,599		
Unionist hold		Swing	−3.1	

General election 1923: Rugby
Party	Candidate	Votes	%	±%
Liberal	Ernest Brown	13,798	55.0	+22.3
Unionist	Euan Wallace	11,286	45.0	−2.6
Majority		2,512	10.0	N/A
Turnout		25,084	75.2	−1.7
Registered electors		33,363		
Liberal gain from Unionist		Swing	+12.5	

General election 1924: Rugby
Party	Candidate	Votes	%	±%
Unionist	David Margesson	14,434	50.2	+5.2
Liberal	Ernest Brown	10,524	36.6	−18.4
Labour	H Yates	3,768	13.1	New
Majority		3,910	13.6	N/A
Turnout		28,726	84.7	+9.5
Registered electors		33,903		
Unionist gain from Liberal		Swing	+11.9	

General election 1929: Rugby
Party	Candidate	Votes	%	±%
Unionist	David Margesson	15,147	41.1	−9.1
Labour	John Morgan	11,588	31.4	+18.3
Liberal	Robert Bernays	10,158	27.5	−9.1
Majority		3,559	9.7	−4.0
Turnout		36,893	84.8	+0.1
Registered electors		43,515		
Unionist hold		Swing	−13.8	

=== Elections in the 1930s ===
General election 1931: Rugby
Party	Candidate	Votes	%	±%
Conservative	David Margesson	24,493	69.95	
Labour	E. J. Pay	10,523	30.05	
Majority		13,970	39.90	
Turnout		35,016	78.93	
Conservative hold		Swing		

General election 1935: Rugby
Party	Candidate	Votes	%	±%
Conservative	David Margesson	20,905	61.6	−8.3
Labour	H William Fenner	13,061	38.5	+8.5
Majority		7,844	23.1	−16.8
Turnout		33,966	73.8	−5.1
Conservative hold		Swing		

General Election 1939–40:

Another general election was required to take place before the end of 1940. The political parties had been making preparations for an election to take place from 1939 and by the end of this year, the following candidates had been selected;

- Conservative: David Margesson
- Liberal: M E Avery
- Labour: A E Millett

=== Elections in the 1940s ===
1942 Rugby by-election
Party	Candidate	Votes	%	±%
Independent	William Brown	9,824	51.8	New
Conservative	Claude Vivian Holbrook	9,145	48.2	−13.4
Majority		679	3.6	N/A
Turnout		18,969	38.5	−35.3
Independent gain from Conservative		Swing		

General election 1945: Rugby
Party	Candidate	Votes	%	±%
Independent	William Brown	18,615	40.4	N/A
Conservative	John Lakin	17,049	37.0	−24.6
Labour	Ronald Lewis	10,470	22.7	−15.8
Majority		1,566	3.4	N/A
Turnout		46,144	73.6	−0.2
Independent gain from Conservative		Swing		

=== Elections in the 1950s ===
General election 1950: Rugby
Party	Candidate	Votes	%	±%
Labour	James Johnson	15,983	41.0	+18.3
Conservative	James Dance	14,947	38.3	+1.6
Independent	William Brown	8,080	20.7	−19.7
Majority		1,036	2.7	N/A
Turnout		39,010	88.2	+14.6
Labour gain from Independent		Swing		

General election 1951: Rugby
Party	Candidate	Votes	%	±%
Labour	James Johnson	19,995	50.3	+0.3
Conservative	James Dance	19,796	49.7	+11.4
Majority		199	0.5	−2.2
Turnout		39,808	87.7	−0.5
Labour hold		Swing		

General election 1955: Rugby
Party	Candidate	Votes	%	±%
Labour	James Johnson	19,709	50.1	−0.2
Conservative	Harold Soref	18,331	46.6	−3.1
Independent	Eric H Shafer	1,274	3.2	New
Majority		1,378	3.5	+3.0
Turnout		39,293	85.4	−2.3
Labour hold		Swing		

General election 1959: Rugby
Party	Candidate	Votes	%	±%
Conservative	Roy Wise	17,429	42.6	−4.0
Labour	James Johnson	16,959	41.4	−8.7
Liberal	Simon Goldblatt	6,413	15.7	New
Independent	Archie S Frost	142	0.4	N/A
Majority		470	1.2	−2.3
Turnout		40,924	85.6	+0.2
Conservative gain from Labour		Swing		

=== Elections in the 1960s ===
General election 1964: Rugby
Party	Candidate	Votes	%	±%
Conservative	Roy Wise	19,221	45.1	+2.5
Labour	D.H. Childs	17,532	41.2	−0.2
Liberal	Simon Goldblatt	5,522	13.0	−2.7
Social Credit	Archie S Frost	304	0.7	New
Majority		1,689	3.9	+2.7
Turnout		42,580	84.6	−1.0
Conservative hold		Swing		

General election 1966: Rugby
Party	Candidate	Votes	%	±%
Labour	William Price	21,797	50.0	+8.8
Conservative	Roy Wise	21,388	49.0	+3.9
Social Credit	Archie S Frost	397	0.9	+0.2
Majority		409	1.0	N/A
Turnout		43,579	84.9	+0.3
Labour gain from Conservative		Swing		

=== Elections in the 1970s ===
General election 1970: Rugby
Party	Candidate	Votes	%	±%
Labour	William Price	25,041	52.8	+2.8
Conservative	J.H.P. Griffith	22,086	46.6	−2.4
Social Credit	Archie S Frost	254	0.5	−0.4
Majority		2,955	6.2	+5.2
Turnout		47,381	81.8	−3.1
Labour hold		Swing		

General election February 1974: Rugby
Party	Candidate	Votes	%	±%
Labour	William Price	25,176	49.5	−3.4
Conservative	Tim Boswell	19,022	37.4	−9.2
Liberal	J. Campbell	6,560	12.9	New
Social Credit	Archie S Frost	106	0.2	−0.3
Majority		6,154	12.1	−5.9
Turnout		50,884	86.2	+4.4
Labour hold		Swing		

General election October 1974: Rugby
Party	Candidate	Votes	%	±%
Labour	William Price	22,926	48.2	−1.3
Conservative	Tony Marlow	17,722	37.3	−0.1
Liberal	A. Butcher	6,775	14.3	+1.4
Social Credit	Archie S Frost	137	0.3	+0.1
Majority		5,204	10.9	−1.2
Turnout		47,560	79.8	−6.4
Labour hold		Swing		

General election 1979: Rugby
Party	Candidate	Votes	%	±%
Conservative	Jim Pawsey	24,417	47.3	+10.0
Labour	William Price	21,688	42.0	−6.2
Liberal	B. Lomax	4,945	9.6	−4.7
National Front	A. Gresham	551	1.0	New
Majority		2,729	5.3	N/A
Turnout		51,603	83.9	+4.1
Conservative gain from Labour		Swing		

== See also ==
- List of parliamentary constituencies in Warwickshire
- List of parliamentary constituencies in West Midlands (region)
