= Jim Pawsey =

British politician

James Francis Pawsey (born 21 August 1933) is a retired British Conservative politician. He was educated at Coventry Technical School and Coventry Technical College (both later merged into City College Coventry).

Pawsey was a local councillor in Warwickshire from 1965 to 1979, Member of Parliament for Rugby from 1979 to 1983 and then for Rugby and Kenilworth from 1983 to 1997, when he lost the seat in the general election to Labour's Andy King.

His son, Mark Pawsey, was elected Member of Parliament for the new constituency of Rugby at the 2010 general election.

Parliament of the United Kingdom
Preceded by William George Price	Member of Parliament for Rugby; 1979–1983	Constituency abolished
New constituency	Member of Parliament for Rugby and Kenilworth; 1983–1997	Succeeded by Andy King
