= Corrie Grant =

British politician

Corrie Grant

Corrie Grant (14 November 1850 – December 1924) was a British journalist, barrister and Liberal Party politician who served as the member of parliament (MP) for the Rugby division of Warwickshire from 1900 to 1910.

== Early life ==
Grant was born in Kettleburgh, Suffolk to Frances Ann and James Brighton Grant, a brewer and maltster who had been imprisoned for non-payment of Church Rates. He was educated at the City of London School, worked as a journalist, and was called to the bar in 1877 at the Middle Temple, after which he practised on the North Eastern Circuit.

== Political career ==
Grant stood for Parliament four times before winning a seat. He stood unsuccessfully in Woodstock at the by-election in July 1885, in Birmingham West at the 1892 general election, in Rugby at the 1895 general election, and in Harrow at a by-election in 1899.

He was elected at the 1900 general election as MP for Rugby, re-elected in 1906, and stood down from the House of Commons at the January 1910 general election.

== Family ==
Grant was married in 1885 to Annie Adams of Plymouth.

== Notes and references ==
Parliament of the United Kingdom
Preceded by Richard Grenville Verney	Member of Parliament for Rugby; 1900 – January 1910	Succeeded by John Baird
