= Roy Wise =

British Conservative Party politician

Alfred Roy Wise (7 July 1901 – 21 August 1974) was a British Conservative Party politician and was the Member of Parliament for the constituencies of Rugby and Smethwick.

== Biography ==
He was born on 7 July 1901 to Alfred Gascoyne Wise and Augusta Frances Nugent. His father was a judge for the Supreme Court of Hong Kong, and his brother was Percival Kinnear Wise. He was educated at Repton and Oriel College, Oxford. He was a falmboyant character and something of a dandy as a young man.

He married Cassandra Coke and had one son, Group Captain Adam Nugent Wise LVO MBE RAF, born 1943.

He served in Kenya as Assistant District Commissioner from 1923 and 1926. He unsuccessfully contested Smethwick in 1929, losing to Oswald Mosley.

He was elected to the House of Commons at the 1931 general election as member of parliament (MP) for Smethwick, holding the seat until his defeat in the Labour landslide at the 1945 general election, when he contested Epping, replacing the Conservative candidature of Prime Minister Winston Churchill who had transferred his candidature to the new, safer seat of Woodford. In the 1930s he advocated a Bill prohibiting Government Ministers from travelling in Europe in anything faster than a stage coach.

During his time out of the Commons, he was attached to the Foreign Office serving with the British Intelligence Service in Germany until 1953 and then worked as a business consultant and served on Westminster City Council.

He returned to the House of Commons at the 1959 general election as MP for Rugby, winning the seat from the sitting Labour MP James Johnson with a majority of only 407.

Wise was re-elected at the 1964 election with a slightly increased majority of 1,689. However, at the 1966 general election he lost the seat to the Labour candidate, William Price by a margin of only 409 votes.

He was one of the sitting MPs who became serving officers in 1939 rising to Lieutenant-Colonel with the Queen's Royal Regiment (West Surrey).

He died on 21 August 1974.

== Electoral history ==
General election 1929: Smethwick
| Party | Candidate | Votes | % | ±% |
|---|---|---|---|---|
| Labour | Oswald Mosley | 19,550 | 54.8 | −2.3 |
| Unionist | Roy Wise | 12,210 | 34.2 | +0.5 |
| Liberal | Maude Egerton Marshall | 3,909 | 11.0 | +1.8 |
| Majority | | 7,340 | 20.6 | −2.8 |
| Turnout | | 35,669 | 78.9 | +0.3 |
| Labour hold | | Swing | 1.4 | |

General election 1931: Smethwick
| Party | Candidate | Votes | % | ±% |
|---|---|---|---|---|
| Conservative | Roy Wise | 20,945 | 60.1 | +25.7 |
| Labour | W. Ernest Lawrence | 13,927 | 39.9 | −14.9 |
| Majority | | 7,018 | 20.2 | n/a |
| Turnout | | 34,872 | 74.7 | −4.2 |
| Conservative gain from Labour | | Swing | 20.3 | |

General election 1935: Smethwick
| Party | Candidate | Votes | % | ±% |
|---|---|---|---|---|
| Conservative | Roy Wise | 16,575 | 52.5 | −7.7 |
| Labour | Charles Wortham Brook | 15,023 | 47.5 | +7.6 |
| Majority | | 1,552 | 5.0 | −17.2 |
| Turnout | | 31,598 | 70.7 | −4.0 |
| Conservative hold | | Swing | −7.7 | |

General election 1945: Epping
| Party | Candidate | Votes | % | ±% |
|---|---|---|---|---|
| Labour | Leah Manning | 15,993 | 44.1 | +19.3 |
| Conservative | Roy Wise | 15,006 | 41.3 | −17.8 |
| Liberal | Sydney Robinson | 5,134 | 14.6 | −1.9 |
| Majority | | 987 | 2.8 | |
| Turnout | | 36,313 | 71.4 | +3.7 |
| Labour gain from Conservative | | Swing | +18.6 | |

General election 1959: Rugby
| Party | Candidate | Votes | % | ±% |
|---|---|---|---|---|
| Conservative | Roy Wise | 17,429 | 42.6 | −4.0 |
| Labour | James Johnson | 16,959 | 41.4 | −8.7 |
| Liberal | Simon Goldblatt | 6,413 | 15.7 | N/A |
| Independent | Archie S Frost | 142 | 0.4 | N/A |
| Majority | | 470 | 1.2 | −2.3 |
| Turnout | | 40,924 | 85.6 | +0.2 |
| Conservative gain from Labour | | Swing | | |

General election 1964: Rugby
| Party | Candidate | Votes | % | ±% |
|---|---|---|---|---|
| Conservative | Roy Wise | 19,221 | 45.1 | +2.5 |
| Labour | D.H. Childs | 17,532 | 41.2 | −0.2 |
| Liberal | Simon Goldblatt | 5,522 | 13.0 | −2.7 |
| Social Credit | Archie S Frost | 304 | 0.7 | N/A |
| Majority | | 1,689 | 4.0 | +2.8 |
| Turnout | | 42,580 | 84.6 | −1.0 |
| Conservative hold | | Swing | | |

General election 1966: Rugby
| Party | Candidate | Votes | % | ±% |
|---|---|---|---|---|
| Labour | William Price | 21,797 | 50.0 | +8.8 |
| Conservative | Roy Wise | 21,388 | 49.0 | +3.9 |
| Social Credit | Archie S Frost | 397 | 0.9 | +0.2 |
| Majority | | 409 | 0.9 | −3.1 |
| Turnout | | 43,579 | 84.9 | +0.3 |
| Labour gain from Conservative | | Swing | | |

Parliament of the United Kingdom
| Preceded by Sir Oswald Mosley | Member of Parliament for Smethwick; 1931–1945 | Succeeded by Alfred Dobbs |
| Preceded by James Johnson | Member of Parliament for Rugby; 1959–1966 | Succeeded by William Price |
