= William Price (Labour politician) =

British politician

Member of Parliament for Rugby
- In office 31 March 1966 – 7 April 1979
- Preceded by: Roy Wise
- Succeeded by: Jim Pawsey

Personal details
- Born: 15 June 1934
- Died: 6 May 1999 (aged 64)
- Party: Labour
- Education: Forest of Dean Technical School; Gloucester Technical College
- Occupation: Journalist, trade unionist and politician

William George Price (15 June 1934 – 6 May 1999) was a British Labour Party politician.

== Biography ==
Price was educated at the Forest of Dean Technical School and Gloucester Technical College. He was a journalist by trade, writing for the Coventry Evening Telegraph and the Birmingham Post & Mail, and was secretary of the Central Midland National Union of Journalists.

Price was Member of Parliament for Rugby from 1966 to 1979, when he lost the seat to the Conservative Jim Pawsey. A pro-European social democrat, he was one of 69 Labour MPs who broke a three-line whip to vote with the Conservative Government in support of Britain's entry to the European Economic Community in October 1971. Following his defeat he stood for election once more, in the marginal Dudley West constituency in 1983, but lost to John Blackburn. After leaving politics he became a consultant to the National Federation of Licensed Victuallers.

== Sources ==
- Times Guide to the House of Commons 1979
- Leigh Rayment's Historical List of MPs

Parliament of the United Kingdom
Preceded by Roy Wise	Member of Parliament for Rugby; 1966–1979	Succeeded by Jim Pawsey
