= Oliver Simmonds =

Sir Oliver Simmonds
- Born: Oliver Edwin Simmonds; 22 November 1897; King's Lynn, Norfolk, England
- Died: 26 July 1985 (aged 87); Guernsey, Channel Islands
- Occupations: Aircraft engineer, Member of Parliament, Industrialist
- Known for: Aircraft designs including the Simmonds Spartan
- Spouse: Gladys E. Hewitt
- Children: Doreen P. Kay, Geoffrey R. Simmonds, and Janette P. Gailey

Sir Oliver Edwin Simmonds, FRAeS (22 November 1897 – 26 July 1985) was a British aviation pioneer, aircraft engineer and Conservative Party politician. He was the Member of Parliament (MP) for Birmingham Duddeston from 1931 to 1945.

== Early life ==
Simmonds was born on 22 November 1897 in King's Lynn, Norfolk, the elder son of the Rev Frederick Simmonds, a lawyer by training and a Congregational Minister by avocation. He was educated at Taunton School in Somerset.

In early 1916, he volunteered to join the Royal Flying Corps as a pilot. He was trained at Weybridge, Surrey. He received his wings and in March 1916 joined 25 Squadron in France. He piloted a Royal Aircraft Factory F.E.2b, a light bomber and observation aircraft. Arthur Tedder, later Deputy Supreme Commander of all Allied Forces in Northern Europe in 1944/45, was also a member of 25 Squadron at that time.

Upon demobilisation Simmonds went up to Magdalene College, Cambridge, as an exhibitioner in 1919. He switched from reading History to Engineering, earning his degree in 1922. While at Cambridge he joined the Cambridge University Aeronautical Society.

== Aviation career ==
Simmonds joined the Royal Aircraft Factory in 1922. During his time at Farnborough, Simmonds wrote a joint paper on the results of a test in the Wind Tunnel. Simmonds was then transferred to the Air Worthiness Dept, which was responsible for approving and granting a British Certificate of Airworthiness to each newly designed aircraft. This position required him to visit the design offices of all the British Aircraft designers, where he saw first hand all the new design ideas that were evolving.

After the US won the Schneider Trophy in 1924 at a speed of about 240 mph, the British Air Ministry called for a new monoplane challenger that could achieve 300 mph in level flight. In a search for new talent, R.J. Mitchell at Supermarine interviewed Simmonds and invited him to join the design team. In the 1960s, while talking to another former Schneider team member, he was reminded how the fuselage diameter of the Supermarine S.5 was determined. Simmonds had asked one of the team to put a piece of plywood vertically against the wall. He then sat on the floor with his back to the plywood, while a colleague drew a line around his body. This became the fuselage diameter. Simmonds was a small man physically, which is the reason that the RAF pilots chosen to fly the aircraft were of a similar stature. This Supermarine series of aircraft won the Schneider Trophy in 1927, 1929 and 1931, thereby winning it outright. The last of the Series, the Supermarine S6B was the first aircraft to exceed 400 mph in level flight, over the Solent, on 23 September 1931.

During Simmonds' time with Supermarine, he had begun, in his spare time, working on the design of a new light aircraft, which he later named the Spartan. It had interchangeable wings and interchangeable tail surfaces, a particular advantage in export markets. This resulted in a disagreement between Simmonds and Supermarine and the former announced in July 1928 that he was leaving Supermarine to form his own company to produce the Spartan.

In 1928 Simmonds formed two companies: Simmonds Aircraft, Ltd.— Capital £20,000, in £1 shares. With the purpose of acquiring interests in patents, licences, concessions and the like held by the Simmonds Interchangeable Wing Co., Ltd., and to acquire from O. E. Simmonds licences relating to the building, manufacture, design and sale of the Simmonds Spartan Light Aeroplane. The company produced a significant number of Spartans and also de Havilland Moths under license. In 1931, as the US depression began to be felt in Britain, Simmonds sold his interest in the company to Whitehall Securities Corporation. When the first Simmonds Spartan was rolled out in 1929, Simmonds was able to announce the company had orders for 54 Spartans and had a contract to produce the Blackburn ?

== Parliament ==
In 1931 Simmonds entered politics as a Conservative. He was elected at the 1931 general election as the MP for Birmingham Duddeston. He held the seat until the 1945 general election. In the House Simmonds spoke on aviation, workers' conditions and Civil Defense. With other MP's he visited Spain during the Civil War there, to study the effects of aerial warfare on the civil population. On his return to Britain he formed the Air Raid Precautions Institute. This institute issued recommendations for the protection of the civilian population in the event of war.

== Simmonds Aerocessories ==
In 1931, following the sale of Simmonds Aircraft, Simmonds attended the annual Air Show at Le Bourget, which included a large display of aircraft equipment suppliers. One of these was the Coursey Company which made push pull controls for use in operating aircraft control surfaces. Simmonds did an instant market survey and realized this product could end the use of bell cranks and levers to control aircraft flight surfaces. He negotiated an exclusive license to produce and sell these devices in all the world except France.

Returning to Britain he set about forming Simmonds Aerocessories Ltd, entering into a manufacturing arrangement with Accles and Shelvoke in Birmingham and establishing a sales and administrative office in London. He soon had many customers.

In about 1933, Simmonds travelled to the US and followed up with some of the US contacts he had made back in the Schneider Trophy days. One of these contacts showed him a new nut, which was unique in that it had a red fibre insert, which caused the nut to retain its position on a bolt, irrespective of vibration. Simmonds realized this nut had the potential to do away with cotter pins. The holder of the worldwide patents was a Swede named Renefelt. Simmonds obtained an exclusive license for the rest of the world, with the exception of the US and Sweden. The two licenses for the Push Pull Control and the Elastic Stop Nut became the basis of the company's early rapid growth. In the second half of the 1930s Simmonds established his own manufacturing facilities in the UK, France, Poland, the US and Australia. Offices were also established in Canada.

Following the outbreak of WW II, manufacturing facilities were rapidly expanded to meet growing demand. Large manufacturing facilities were then acquired at Treforest, near Cardiff in Glamorganshire. The company also later took over the space owned by the Coty Cosmetics Company, also on the Great West Rd and further space in Sunderland.

In the late 1930s Simmonds had become the exclusive British and European licensee for the aircraft fuel gauging systems produced by the Liquidometer Corporation of New York, USA. As part of the company's entry into this market segment, Simmonds had hired a refugee Polish engineer. Between the two of them they conceived how to measure fuel electrically thereby providing much greater accuracy, irrespective of an aircraft's flight attitude. They went on to patent and produce such a system, called Pacitor. The first British aircraft to use this system was the country's first jet fighter, the Gloster Meteor, which first saw combat in 1944, chasing and shooting down many German V-1 missiles.

These Pacitor fuel gauging systems were licensed to the US Simmonds company and became the basis of that company evolving after WW II from producing mainly mechanical products to moving first to electro-mechanical products and finally in the 1960s to mostly electronic products.

After the end of World War II new orders for all military aircraft came to an abrupt halt. Simmonds consolidated all its reduced operations at its Treforest factory, near Cardiff. In 1947 British Overseas Airways (B.O.A.C.) took over the former Simmonds works on the Great West Road, London.

In 1947 the Electric and General Industrial Trusts, Ltd., of which Mr. C. W. Hayward was chairman, bought the entire share capital of Simmonds Aerocessories, Ltd., and Simmonds Products, Ltd. Sir Oliver retained his interests in Simmonds Development Corp., Ltd, which held many of the Simmonds patents. Sir Oliver retained his interests in the US, Canadian and French businesses. This last was also sold in the late 1940s to a French Company.

Simmonds Aerocessories was the original manufacturer of surform tools.

On selling his Simmonds / Spartan companies Oliver Simmonds established Simmonds Aerocessories. As the company grew it expanded its interests to producing aircraft controls and a fuel measurement tool that became a standard in the industry. Under his auspices the company grew rapidly spreading across all of Europe as a multi-national and then worldwide into Canada, the US and Australia. In 1941 Simmonds Aerocessories built a one-off target drone the OQ-11 which was tested by the USAAF.

== Bahamas ==
In 1948, Simmonds sold his British-based interests and moved to The Bahamas. He started a construction company and undertook the development of the Balmoral Beach Club, a luxurious hotel on Cable Beach. In its celebrity heyday, the hotel cultivated a relaxed, sophisticated atmosphere and hosted notable guests such as The Beatles who were here to film the movie Help!. Other luminary Balmoral guests included Richard Nixon and the Duke and Duchess of Windsor, the former King Edward VIII and Wallis Simpson.

Simmonds helped to stabilize the hotel industry by becoming the President of The Hotel Employer Association and then the President of The Friends of The Bahamas. Simmonds built 'High Tor' with its 18-foot gracious high ceiling rooms it was designed with care and with an eye to detail still apparent to this day. Simmonds imported English oak panels for doors and an 18th-century carved wooden fireplace as well as many other decorative items. He was an inventor and engineer, there are still features existing today that were considered innovative when he designed them such as the floating spiral staircase and the enormous windows that slide down to disappear completely into the floor. He lived in High Tor until 1963 and he continued to live in Lyford Cay until 1977.

== 4CYTE (foresight) ==
Simmonds invented a game club called 4CYTE (pronounced "foresight"). Each player has an identical set of letters and a six-by-six grid. Players alternate calling letters and placing them on their respective grids. Each player may hold one letter as a stand by. When the grids are filled, the players score the six rows, six column, and two diagonals. When a player has spelled a word that is at least three letters long that player receives points for that scoring line. Longer words are worth more points. The player with the most points wins. In the solitaire version, a player selects thirty six letters and moves them around at will to score a personal best.

Simmonds was President of the club and the first 4CYTE champion. The International 4 CYTE Champions' Club is an unincorporated association owned by the International Parlour Games Corporation Limited, Nassau, Bahamas. Simmonds was President of the club and the first 4CYTE champion.

Parliament of the United Kingdom
Preceded by George Francis Sawyer	Member of Parliament for Birmingham Duddeston; 1931 – 1945	Succeeded by Edith Wills
