= Marie Frances Lisette Hanbury =

British peeress and suffragist (1868–1941)

The Honourable Marie Frances Lisette Hanbury OBE
- Baroness Willoughby de Broke
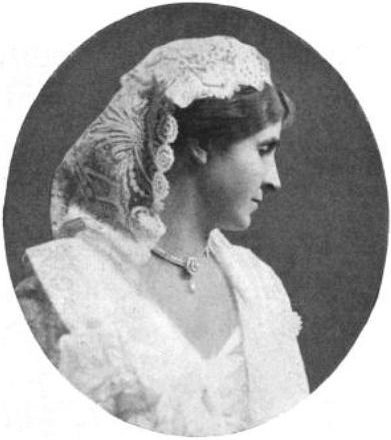
- Born: 20 October 1868; Belmont, East Barnet, Hertfordshire, England
- Died: 14 October 1941 (aged 72); Kineton, Warwickshire, England
- Spouse: Richard Verney, 19th Baron Willoughby de Broke (m. 1895; died 1923)
- Issue: John Verney, 20th Baron Willoughby de Broke
- Father: Charles Addington Hanbury
- Occupation: Peeress and suffragist

Marie Frances Lisette Verney, Baroness Willoughby de Broke OBE (née Hanbury; 20 October 1868 – 14 October 1941) was a British peeress, suffragist and writer. She was a member of the Conservative and Unionist Women's Franchise Association (CUWFA).

== Family ==
Hanbury was born in 1868 in Belmont, East Barnet, Hertfordshire, England and was the youngest daughter of Charles Addington Hanbury and Christine Isabella Hanbury (née Mackenzie).

On 2 July 1895, she married the peer and conservative politician Richard Verney, 19th Baron Willoughby de Broke and they had one son, John Henry Peyto Verney, 20th Baron Willoughby de Broke.

The family lived at Compton Verney, Warwickshire, and Hanbury is known to have gifted her husband the Clarendon Press' most expensive gift edition of Tennyson's Poetical Works.

== Activism ==
Verney was an active suffragist. She became a member of the Conservative and Unionist Women's Franchise Association and was appointed a local president in 1911. As part of her campaigning activities for women's enfranchisement, she organised a march in Stratford-upon-Avon, wrote articles outlining the benefits to women gaining the vote, and planned outings for suffragists from Kineton and Wellesbourne in Warwickshire. After the death of Emily Wilding Davison in 1913, Verney and her husband organised a rally at their home.

During World War I, Verney was Vice President and Commandant at the Kineton Red Cross Auxiliary Hospital.

In 1916, Verney wrote a supplementary chapter for C. Violet Butler's social research report Domestic Service: An Enquiry by the Women’s Industrial Council, which was published in The Economic Journal, Volume 26. This report has since been cited by A Bibliography of Female Economic Thought to 1940 (2004), alongside articles in Accounting Organizations and Society, Left History: An Interdisciplinary Journal of Historical Inquiry and Debate, and The Economic History Review.

== Death ==
Verney died in Kineton on 14 October 1941.
