= Eldred Hallas =

British politician

Eldred Hallas (1870 – 13 June 1926) was a British politician who served as the Member of Parliament (MP) for Birmingham Duddeston from 1918 to 1922.

== Life ==
Born and educated in Yorkshire, Hallas moved to Birmingham in 1906 where he became leader of the Birmingham Municipal Employees Union. In 1911 he was elected as an independent socialist to the Birmingham Town Council for Duddeston and Nechells ward . During World War I, he became associated with the British Workers League which later became the National Democratic and Labour Party (NDP).

In the 1918 general election, Hallas was elected with the Coalition coupon for the NDP in the new Birmingham Duddeston constituency. However, he soon became disillusioned with the Lloyd George Government and joined the Labour Party in October 1919, becoming Birmingham's first Labour MP. He stood down from the House of Commons at the 1922 general election, and unsuccessfully fought the Handsworth ward for Birmingham City Council in the 1923 elections as a Labour candidate. He died in a Moseley nursing home in 1926, and was commemorated by a plaque in the Balsall Heath branch of the Birmingham Municipal Bank.

Parliament of the United Kingdom
New constituency	Member of Parliament for Birmingham Duddeston; 1918 – 1922	Succeeded by Sir Ernest Varvill Hiley
