= Rugby and Kenilworth =

UK Parliament constituency (1983–2010)

Coordinates: 52.35°N 1.35°W

- Former county constituency for the House of Commons
- Boundary of Rugby and Kenilworth in Warwickshire for the 2005 general election

- Location of Warwickshire within England
- County: Warwickshire
- Major settlements: Rugby, Kenilworth

1983–2010
- Seats: One
- Created from: Rugby and Warwick & Leamington
- Replaced by: Kenilworth & Southam; Rugby

Rugby and Kenilworth was a county constituency in Warwickshire, England. It returned one Member of Parliament to the House of Commons of the Parliament of the United Kingdom. It existed from 1983 to 2010.

== History ==
The constituency of Rugby and Kenilworth was created for the 1983 election and was held by the Conservative Jim Pawsey until the 1997 election when the Labour candidate Andy King was narrowly elected. In the 2001 election he increased his majority slightly. The Conservatives regained the seat in 2005, with Jeremy Wright becoming the Member of Parliament.

Rugby and Kenilworth was a marginal seat from 1997 onwards, but had been a safe Conservative seat previously (see Elections). Rugby, being an industrial town, traditionally leans towards Labour. Kenilworth, however, is a prosperous dormitory town and leans towards the Conservatives.

== Boundaries ==
1983–2010: The Borough of Rugby wards of Admirals, Benn, Bilton, Brownsover, Caldecott, Clifton and Newton, Dunchurch and Thurlaston, Eastlands, Hillmorton, Knightlow, Lawford, Leam Valley, New Bilton, Newbold, Overslade, Paddox, Ryton-on-Dunsmore, St Mary's, and Wolston, and the District of Warwick wards of Abbey, Park Hill, St John's, and Stoneleigh.

This Warwickshire seat took in areas from the Rugby and Warwick local authorities. From Rugby came the town itself, and parishes on the Leicestershire and Northamptonshire borders. From neighbouring Warwick came Kenilworth and country villages bordering Coventry and Solihull.

=== Boundary review ===
Following the Boundary Commission for England's review of parliamentary representation in Warwickshire, the Rugby and Kenilworth constituency was abolished for the 2010 general election.

The successor seats were Kenilworth and Southam, which was originally to be named "Mid Warwickshire", and a re-created Rugby constituency.

== Members of Parliament ==
Election	Member	Party
1983	Jim Pawsey	Conservative
1997	Andy King	Labour
2005	Jeremy Wright	Conservative
2010	constituency abolished: see Kenilworth & Southam and Rugby	

== Elections ==
=== Elections in the 2000s ===
General election 2005: Rugby and Kenilworth
Party	Candidate	Votes	%	±%
Conservative	Jeremy Wright	23,447	41.2	+1.5
Labour	Andy King	21,891	38.4	−6.6
Liberal Democrats	Richard Allanach	10,143	17.8	+4.0
UKIP	John Thurley	911	1.6	+0.1
Independent	Brian Hadland	298	0.5	New
Independent	Lillian Phallikaropoulos	258	0.5	New
Majority		1,556	2.8	N/A
Turnout		56,949	68.4	+1.0
Conservative gain from Labour		Swing	+4.0	

General election 2001: Rugby & Kenilworth
Party	Candidate	Votes	%	±%
Labour	Andy King	24,221	45.0	+2.0
Conservative	David Martin	21,344	39.7	−2.5
Liberal Democrats	Gwen Fairweather	7,444	13.8	−0.5
UKIP	Paul Garrett	787	1.5	New
Majority		2,877	5.3	+4.5
Turnout		53,796	67.4	−9.7
Labour hold		Swing	+2.3	

=== Elections in the 1990s ===
General election 1997: Rugby & Kenilworth
Party	Candidate	Votes	%	±%
Labour	Andy King	26,356	43.0	+11.0
Conservative	Jim Pawsey	25,861	42.2	−10.2
Liberal Democrats	Jeremy Roodhouse	8,737	14.3	−1.0
Natural Law	Michael Twite	251	0.4	+0.1
Majority		495	0.8	N/A
Turnout		61,205	77.1	−6.6
Labour gain from Conservative		Swing	+10.6	

General election 1992: Rugby and Kenilworth
Party	Candidate	Votes	%	±%
Conservative	Jim Pawsey	34,110	52.4	+0.8
Labour	J Airey	20,862	32.0	+7.1
Liberal Democrats	JM Roodhouse	9,934	15.3	−8.2
Natural Law	SH Withers	202	0.3	New
Majority		13,248	20.4	−6.2
Turnout		65,108	83.7	+4.1
Conservative hold		Swing	−3.1	

=== Elections in the 1980s ===
General election 1987: Rugby and Kenilworth
Party	Candidate	Votes	%	±%
Conservative	Jim Pawsey	31,485	51.57	
Labour	John Airey	15,221	24.93	
Liberal	David Owen-Jones	14,343	23.49	
Majority		16,264	26.64	
Turnout		61,409	79.64	
Conservative hold		Swing		

General election 1983: Rugby and Kenilworth
Party	Candidate	Votes	%	±%
Conservative	Jim Pawsey	29,622	50.91	
Liberal	David Owen-Jones	15,381	26.44	
Labour	Philip Blundell	13,180	22.65	
Majority		14,241	24.47	
Turnout		58,223	78.10	
Conservative win (new seat)				

== See also ==
- Parliamentary constituencies in Warwickshire
