= Kenilworth and Southam =

UK Parliament constituency (since 2010)

Coordinates: 52.25°N 1.40°W

- County constituency for the House of Commons
- Interactive map of boundaries since 2024
- Boundary within the West Midlands region
- County: Warwickshire
- Electorate: 71,451 (2023)
- Major settlements: Kenilworth, Southam, Wellesbourne

Current constituency
- Created: 2010
- Member of Parliament: Jeremy Wright (Conservative)
- Seats: One
- Created from: Rugby and Kenilworth, Warwick and Leamington, Stratford-on-Avon

Kenilworth and Southam is a constituency (Note: A county constituency (for the purposes of election expenses and type of returning officer)) in Warwickshire, England represented in the House of Commons of the UK Parliament since 2010 by Jeremy Wright, a Conservative who served as Culture Secretary until 24 July 2019, having previously served as Attorney General for England and Wales from 2014 to 2018. (Note: As with all constituencies, the constituency elects one Member of Parliament (MP) by the first past the post system of election at least every five years.)

== Constituency profile ==
The Kenilworth and Southam constituency is located in Warwickshire. It covers a large rural area surrounding the towns of Warwick and Royal Leamington Spa, completely encircling the Warwick and Leamington constituency. Kenilworth is the constituency's largest town, with a population of around 22,000. Other settlements include the small town of Southam and the villages of Wellesbourne, Dunchurch and Long Itchington. The constituency borders Coventry and contains Coventry Airport and around half of the University of Warwick, which lie just outside the city. Kenilworth is a historic market town known for its ruined castle. Southam is also a traditional market town and lies within the area known as Silicon Spa, an important centre for the video game industry; game developer Codemasters is based in the town. Jaguar Land Rover have a large engineering facility and test track near the village of Gaydon, with the site also housing the British Motor Museum. The constituency is highly affluent; most properties have large plots and a substantial majority are semi-detached or detached. Kenilworth falls within the top 10% least-deprived areas in England. House prices across the constituency are higher than the national average and considerably higher than the rest of the West Midlands region.

In general, residents of the constituency are older, well-educated and likely to be homeowners. Rates of household income are very high and a large proportion of residents work in professional, scientific and manufacturing occupations. White people made up 93% of the population at the 2021 census. At the local council level, most of the constituency is represented by Conservative and Liberal Democrat councillors, with the Conservatives being more popular outside the towns and villages. There were also some Green Party councillors elected in and around Kenilworth. An estimated 54% of voters in the constituency supported remaining in the European Union in the 2016 referendum, higher than the nationwide figure of 48%.

== History ==
The constituency was created for the 2010 general election. The result from 2005 for its wards (nominal result as the constituency was not then formed) gave a Conservative majority of 24.8%.

== Boundaries ==
Map of boundaries 2010–2024

Following its review of parliamentary representation in Warwickshire, the Boundary Commission created this new constituency in 2010, pairing Kenilworth and Southam and breaking the parliamentary link between Rugby and Kenilworth established in 1983.

2010–2024: The District of Warwick wards of Abbey, Cubbington, Lapworth, Leek Wootton, Park Hill, Radford Semele, St John's, and Stoneleigh, the District of Stratford-on-Avon wards of Burton Dassett, Fenny Compton, Harbury, Kineton, Long Itchington, Southam, Stockton and Napton, and Wellesbourne, and the Borough of Rugby wards of Dunchurch and Knightlow, Leam Valley, and Ryton-on-Dunsmore.

2024–present: The Borough of Rugby wards of Dunsmore and Leam Valley, the District of Stratford-on-Avon wards of Bishop's Itchington, Fenny Compton & Napton, Gaydon, Kineton & Upper Lighthorne, Harbury, Southam East, Central & Stockton, Southam North & Long Itchington, Southam South, Southam West, Tysoe (part), Wellesbourne East & Rural (part), Wellesbourne North & Rural (part), and Wellesbourne South, and the District of Warwick wards of Budbrooke, Cubbington & Leek Wootton, Kenilworth Abbey & Arden, Kenilworth Park Hill, and Kenilworth St John's.

Minor changes to align boundaries to those of local authority wards. Radford Semele transferred to Warwick and Leamington in exchange for Budbrooke.

== Members of Parliament ==
Election	Member	Party
2010	Jeremy Wright	Conservative

== Elections ==
=== Elections in the 2020s ===
General election 2024: Kenilworth and Southam
Party	Candidate	Votes	%	±%
Conservative	Jeremy Wright	19,395	36.4	▼22.6
Labour	Cat Price	12,821	24.0	▲5.0
Liberal Democrats	Jenny Wilkinson	10,464	19.6	▲2.7
Reform	Jacqui Harris	6,920	13.0	▲12.8
Green	Alix Dearing	3,125	5.9	▲1.7
Monster Raving Loony	Nick Green	442	0.8	Steady
UKIP	Paul De'Ath	153	0.3	New
Majority		6,574	12.4	▼27.6
Turnout		53,320	75.5	▼2.6
Conservative hold		Swing	▼13.8	

=== Elections in the 2010s ===
General election 2019: Kenilworth and Southam
Party	Candidate	Votes	%	±%
Conservative	Jeremy Wright	30,351	57.7	▼3.1
Liberal Democrats	Richard Dickson	9,998	19.0	▲9.4
Labour	Antony Tucker	9,440	17.9	▼7.7
Green	Alison Firth	2,351	4.5	▲2.3
Monster Raving Loony	Nicholas Green	457	0.9	New
Majority		20,353	38.7	▲3.5
Turnout		52,597	77.2	▼0.2
Conservative hold		Swing	▼6.25	

General election 2017: Kenilworth and Southam
Party	Candidate	Votes	%	±%
Conservative	Jeremy Wright	31,207	60.8	▲2.4
Labour	Bally Singh	13,121	25.6	▲10.3
Liberal Democrats	Richard Dickson	4,921	9.6	▼0.5
Green	Rob Ballantyne	1,133	2.2	▼1.8
UKIP	Harry Cottam	929	1.8	▼9.4
Majority		18,086	35.2	▼6.9
Turnout		51,311	77.4	▲2.6
Conservative hold		Swing	▼3.9	

General election 2015: Kenilworth and Southam
Party	Candidate	Votes	%	±%
Conservative	Jeremy Wright	28,474	58.4	▲4.8
Labour	Bally Singh	7,472	15.3	▲0.9
UKIP	Harry Cottam	5,467	11.2	▲8.8
Liberal Democrats	Richard Dickson	4,913	10.1	▼17.6
Green	Rob Ballantyne	1,956	4.0	▲2.8
Monster Raving Loony	Nicholas Green	370	0.8	New
Digital Democracy	Jon Foster-Smith	139	0.3	New
Majority		21,002	43.1	▲17.2
Turnout		48,791	74.8	▼0.5
Conservative hold		Swing	▲1.9	

General election 2010: Kenilworth and Southam
Party	Candidate	Votes	%	±%
Conservative	Jeremy Wright	25,945	53.6	▲12.4
Liberal Democrats	Nigel Rock	13,393	27.7	▲19.9
Labour	Nicholas Milton	6,949	14.4	▼24.0
UKIP	John Moore	1,214	2.4	▲0.8
Green	James Harrison	568	1.2	New
Independent	Joe Rukin	362	0.7	New
Majority		12,552	25.9	▲23.1
Turnout		48,431	75.3	▲6.9
Conservative hold		Swing		

== See also ==
- parliamentary constituencies in Warwickshire
- List of parliamentary constituencies in West Midlands (region)
