= Edith Wills =

British politician (1892–1970)

Member of Parliament for Birmingham Duddeston
- In office 5 July 1945 – 22 February 1950
- Prime Minister: Clement Attlee
- Preceded by: Oliver Simmonds
- Succeeded by: Constituency abolished

Personal details
- Born: Edith Agnes Wood; 21 November 1892
- Died: 7 April 1970 (aged 77)
- Party: Labour
- Spouse: Frank Wills
- Children: One son

Edith Agnes Wills (21 November 1892 – 7 April 1970) was a Labour and Co-operative politician in the United Kingdom.

== Early life ==
Wills was the daughter of John Wood and Henrietta Hook. In 1921, she married Frank Wills, and had one son. She was active in the co-operative movement and is remembered as teaching youth classes for the Birmingham Co-operative Society.

== Career ==
Edith Wills was elected to Birmingham City Council in 1930 and served until 1946. She became a magistrate in the city in 1934 and served on a number of charity boards and other organisations.

Wills was elected as the Member of Parliament (MP) for Birmingham Duddeston in Labour's landslide victory of 1945, gaining the seat from the Conservatives. Wills was the first woman to serve as an MP for the city, and held the seat until 1950, when it was abolished by boundary changes.

Wills returned to the City Council in 1956 in a by-election for the Deritend ward.

Parliament of the United Kingdom
Preceded by Oliver Simmonds	Member of Parliament for Birmingham Duddeston; 1945–1950	Constituency abolished
