= Jeremy Wright =

British lawyer and politician

The Right Honourable Sir Jeremy Wright KC MP
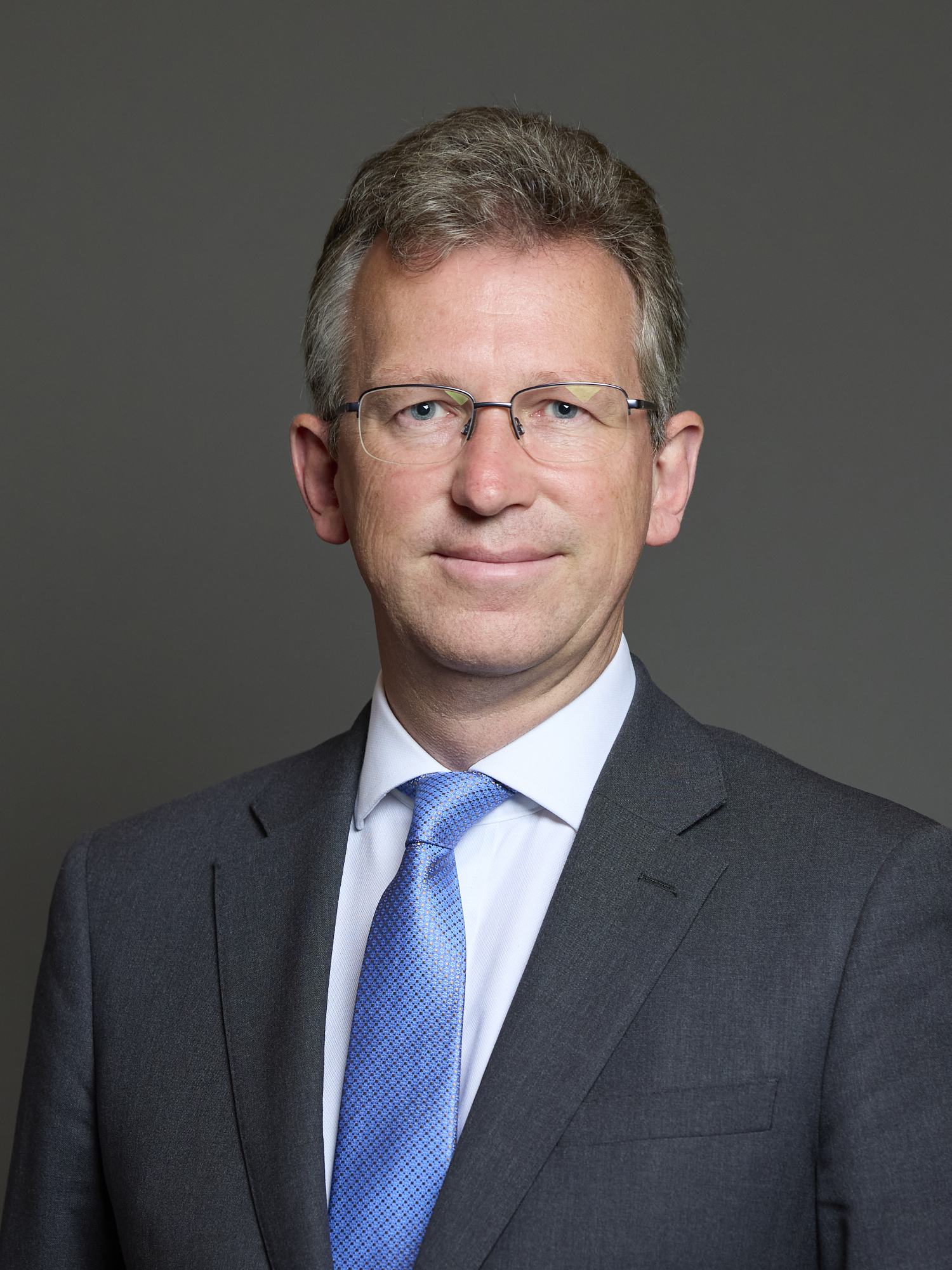
- Official portrait, 2024

Shadow Attorney General for England and Wales
- In office 8 July 2024 – 5 November 2024
- Leader: Rishi Sunak
- Preceded by: Emily Thornberry
- Succeeded by: The Lord Wolfson of Tredegar

Secretary of State for Digital, Culture, Media and Sport
- In office 9 July 2018 – 24 July 2019
- Prime Minister: Theresa May
- Preceded by: Matt Hancock
- Succeeded by: Nicky Morgan

Attorney General for England and Wales Advocate General for Northern Ireland
- In office 15 July 2014 – 9 July 2018
- Prime Minister: David Cameron; Theresa May
- Preceded by: Dominic Grieve
- Succeeded by: Sir Geoffrey Cox

Parliamentary Under-Secretary of State for Prisons and Rehabilitation
- In office 6 September 2012 – 15 July 2014
- Prime Minister: David Cameron
- Preceded by: Crispin Blunt
- Succeeded by: Andrew Selous

Lord Commissioner of the Treasury
- In office 12 May 2010 – 6 September 2012
- Prime Minister: David Cameron
- Preceded by: Steve McCabe
- Succeeded by: Mark Lancaster

Member of Parliament for Kenilworth and Southam Rugby and Kenilworth (2005–2010)
- Incumbent
- Assumed office 5 May 2005
- Preceded by: Andy King
- Majority: 6,574 (12.4%)

Personal details
- Born: 24 October 1972 (age 53) Taunton, Somerset, England
- Party: Conservative
- Spouse: Yvonne Salter (m. 1998)
- Children: 2
- Education: University of Exeter
- Website: www.jeremywright.org.uk

Sir Jeremy Paul Wright KC (born 24 October 1972) is a British lawyer and politician who served as Attorney General for England and Wales from 2014 to 2018 and as Secretary of State for Digital, Culture, Media and Sport from 2018 to 2019. A member of the Conservative Party, he has been the Member of Parliament (MP) for Kenilworth and Southam, previously Rugby and Kenilworth, since the 2005 general election and served as Shadow Attorney General from July to November 2024.

He served as Lord Commissioner of the Treasury from 12 May 2010 until his appointment as Minister of State for Prisons at the Ministry of Justice on 6 September 2012. He became Attorney General for England and Wales and Advocate General for Northern Ireland on 15 July 2014. Wright replaced Matt Hancock as culture secretary on 9 July 2018, serving in the post for a year until being sacked by incoming prime minister Boris Johnson in July 2019 and returning to the backbenches.

== Early life and career ==
Jeremy Wright was born on 24 October 1972 in Taunton, Somerset. His parents were both teachers and he has one brother who served as a Commander in the Royal Navy. Wright was educated at two independent schools: Taunton School and Trinity School, New York City, before going to the University of Exeter, where he graduated as a Bachelor of Laws.

He was called to the Bar at the Inner Temple in 1996 and specialised in criminal law in the Midlands until his election to Parliament in 2005. Wright remains a member of No.5 Chambers in Birmingham but is officially listed as non-practising as of May 2013.

== Parliamentary career ==
=== Early political career ===
Wright was first elected to Parliament at the 2005 general election, when he won the seat of Rugby and Kenilworth. He won the seat with 41.2% of the vote and a majority of 1,556.

In July 2007, Wright was appointed as an Opposition Whip and served as a Government Whip from 2010 until 2012, holding the office of Lord Commissioner of the Treasury. He served as a member of the Constitutional Affairs Select Committee between 2005 and 2007.

Wright has generally supported the proposals for the HS2 London to Birmingham rail link which will run through his constituency. He has opposed some of the detailed original plans for the route, although supporting route changes made in 2010.

=== In government ===
At the 2010 general election, Wright was elected for the newly created seat of Kenilworth and Southam with 53.6% of the vote and a majority of 12,552.

In September 2012 Wright was appointed Parliamentary Under-Secretary of State in the Ministry of Justice. His specific responsibility was as Minister for Prisons and Rehabilitation. He was appointed Attorney General on 15 July 2014, replacing Dominic Grieve. For the purposes of this role, he was appointed a Queen's Counsel.

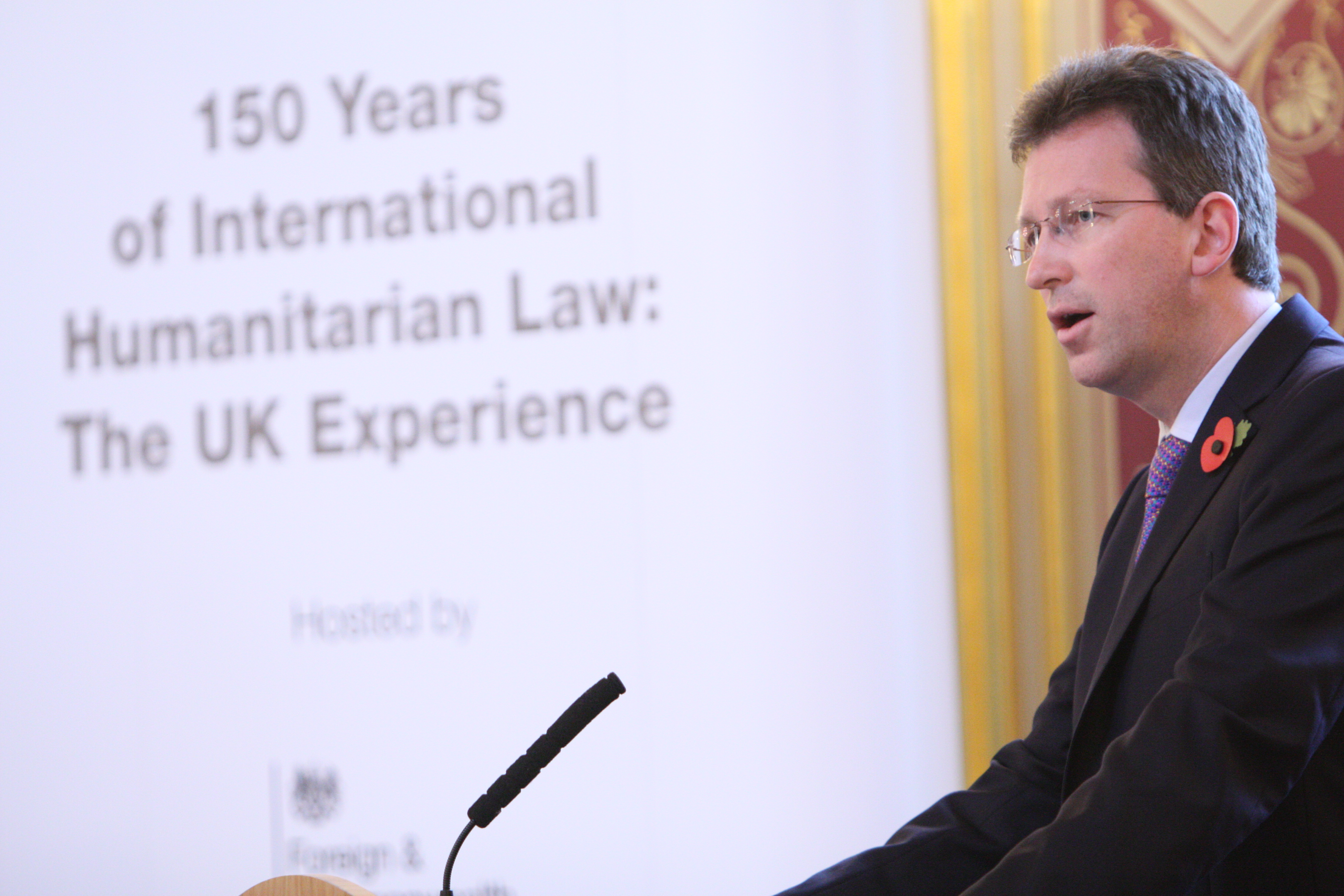
Wright speaks at the 150 Years of International Humanitarian Law: The UK Perspective event in London on 29 October 2014.

At the 2015 general election, Wright was re-elected with an increased vote share of 58.4% and an increased majority of 21,002.

Wright campaigned for the United Kingdom to remain in the European Union before the EU membership referendum on 23 June 2016.

In November 2016, Wright was criticised by a number of other Conservative MPs for his role in the Government's loss of a High Court case which gave MPs and peers a veto over when Brexit begins. Although it was suggested that he should resign as Attorney General, Wright retained his position.

At the snap 2017 general election, Wright was again re-elected, with an increased vote share of 60.8% but a decreased majority of 18,086.

In July 2018, after a series of resignations in May's cabinet after her decision of a "Soft Brexit" was reached at Chequers, Wright was appointed to Secretary of State for Digital, Culture, Media and Sport, after Matt Hancock was moved to become Secretary of State for Health and Social Care.

With Sajid Javid in late 2018, Wright warned social media firms that "the era of self-regulation is coming to an end" with regard to extremist content and announced a forthcoming 'online harms white paper', published in April 2019, which is expected to introduce legal regulation of online publishers and social media, including new censorship rules.

At the 2019 general election, Wright was again re-elected, with a decreased vote share of 57.7% but an increased majority of 20,353.

In late May 2022, Jeremy Wright became the 27th Conservative MP to publicly call for Prime Minister Boris Johnson to resign, in a 2,000 word letter on his website.

=== In opposition ===
Following the Conservative Party's defeat in the 2024 United Kingdom general election and the subsequent formation of the Starmer ministry, Wright was appointed Shadow Attorney General in Rishi Sunak's caretaker Shadow Cabinet.

== Register of Members' Interests ==
From 1 September 2021 to 1 September 2022, Wright was a professor of Practice at the University of Warwick in Coventry, for which he received £10,000 per annum, paid monthly. This was for approximately 3 hours a week. (Registered 1 October 2021).

=== Expenses claims ===
Wright has defended his expenses claims as an MP, including claiming nearly £3,000 for the purchase of furniture for a flat in London after he became an MP in 2005. He repaid £46.71 over-claimed for council tax in 2007–08 after a "genuine mistake". He also claimed just under £800 in mobile phone call charges which he was ordered to repay. He appealed the decision to order repayment of these expenses, claiming that he had requested permission to charge an amount for mobile phone calls as he did not have a landline installed in his London flat. Wright succeeded in his appeal and was not required to repay the amount claimed for mobile phone calls. Wright published errors on his website in 2009, placing political links on it, an activity banned if costs for the site are paid for from Parliamentary expenses, although he was not required to repay the expenses claimed in this instance.

== Personal life ==
He married Yvonne Salter in 1998, with whom he has a son and a daughter. He and his wife live in the village of Shrewley in Warwickshire.

In November 2018, Wright said that he likes to unwind by spending time with his "very large" Lego collection. Wright described assembling lego bricks as "therapeutic".

He was knighted in the 2022 Birthday Honours for political and public service.

Parliament of the United Kingdom
Preceded by Andy King	Member of Parliament for Rugby and Kenilworth; 2005–2010	Constituency abolished
New constituency	Member of Parliament for Kenilworth and Southam; 2010–present	Incumbent
Political offices
Preceded by Crispin Blunt	Minister of State for Justice; 2012–2014	Succeeded by Mike Penning
Preceded by Dominic Grieve	Attorney General for England and Wales; 2014–2018	Succeeded by Geoffrey Cox
Preceded by Dominic Grieve	Advocate General for Northern Ireland; 2014–2018	Succeeded by Geoffrey Cox
Preceded by Matt Hancock	Secretary of State for Digital, Culture, Media and Sport; 2018–2019	Succeeded by Nicky Morgan
Preceded by Emily Thornberry	Shadow Attorney General for England and Wales; 2024–present	Incumbent
