= Henry Peyton Cobb =

English banker, solicitor and Liberal politician

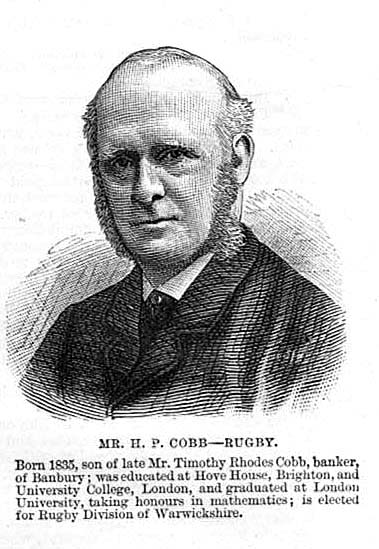
- Henry Peyton Cobb

Member of Parliament for Rugby
- In office 1885–1895
- Preceded by: New constituency
- Succeeded by: Richard Greville Verney

Personal details
- Born: 19 October 1835 Banbury, Oxfordshire, England
- Died: 27 January 1910 (aged 74)
- Party: Liberal
- Occupation: Banker, solicitor

Henry Peyton Cobb (19 October 1835 – 27 January 1910) was an English banker, solicitor and Liberal politician.

Cobb was born in Banbury, Oxfordshire, the son of Timothy Rhodes Cobb and his wife Charlotte, née Pix. His father was a partner the family in girth-weaving business and in Cobbs' Bank in Banbury. His father was also a Unitarian and Cobb was baptised at the Horse Fair Presbyterian chapel. He became a partner in the family bank and a solicitor in London, where he lived at Wealdstone House Harrow on the Hill, Middlesex.

In 1885 Cobb was elected as member of parliament for Rugby. He held the seat until 1895.

Cobb died at the age of 74.

He married Frances Taylor. His son John Henry married Ellen Beatrice Jaques, daughter of John Jaques II, of Jaques of London. He was also the grandfather of Michael Cobb (railway historian). He married Elizabeth Sharpe as his second wife in 1872. His daughter Mildred married Balthazar Foster, 2nd Baron Ilkeston.

Coat of arms : Per chevron gules and sables, two shovellers in chief argent, and a fish naiant in base. Crest: an elephant passant, or.

Motto : Spectemur agendo

Parliament of the United Kingdom
| New constituency | Member of Parliament for Rugby; 1885 – 1895 | Succeeded by Richard Greville Verney |
