= Birmingham Duddeston =

Parliamentary constituency in the United Kingdom, 1918–1950

- Former borough constituency for the House of Commons
- Local government in West Midlands: Warwickshire

1918–1950
- Seats: One
- Created from: Birmingham East and Birmingham North
- Replaced by: Birmingham Aston (Majority) and Birmingham Small Heath (Part)

Birmingham Duddeston was a constituency of the House of Commons of the Parliament of the United Kingdom from 1918 to 1950. It elected one Member of Parliament (MP) by the first-past-the-post system of election.

== Boundaries ==
The Representation of the People Act 1918 provided that the constituency was to consist of "Duddeston and Nechells Ward, St Mary's Ward (except the part thereof included in the Aston Division), and so much of the portion of Aston Ward which is not included in the Aston Division as lies to the west of the London and North Western Railway".

On its abolition by the Representation of the People Act 1948, the Duddeston and Nechells Wards became part of the Small Heath constituency, and the St Mary's and Aston wards were transferred in their entirety to the Aston constituency.

== Members of Parliament ==
Election	Member	Party
1918	Eldred Hallas	NDP
1919	Eldred Hallas	Labour
1922	Sir Ernest Hiley	Conservative
1923	John Burman	Conservative
1929	George Francis Sawyer	Labour
1931	Sir Oliver Simmonds	Conservative
1945	Edith Wills	Labour Co-op
1950	Constituency abolished	

== Election results ==
=== Election in the 1910s ===
General election 1918: Birmingham Duddeston
Party		Candidate	Votes	%
C	National Democratic and Labour Party	Eldred Hallas	8,796	79.41
	Liberal	John Crowley	2,280	20.59
Majority			6,516	58.82
Turnout			11,076	32.42
Registered electors			34,167	
	National Democratic win (new seat)			
C indicates candidate endorsed by the coalition government.

=== Elections in the 1920s ===
General election 1922: Birmingham Duddeston
Party	Candidate	Votes	%	±%
Unionist	Ernest Hiley	13,091	61.11	New
Labour	Michael Brothers	8,331	38.89	New
Majority		4,760	22.22	N/A
Turnout		21,422	62.29	+29.87
Registered electors		34,388		
Unionist gain from National Democratic		Swing	N/A	

General election 1923: Birmingham Duddeston
Party	Candidate	Votes	%	±%
Unionist	John Burman	11,712	59.58	−1.53
Labour	George Francis Sawyer	7,309	37.19	−1.70
Free Trade	A Ford	634	3.23	New
Majority		4,403	22.39	+0.17
Turnout		19,655	56.88	−5.41
Registered electors		34,553		
Unionist hold		Swing	+0.09	

General election 1924: Birmingham Duddeston
Party	Candidate	Votes	%	±%
Unionist	John Burman	11,407	51.15	−8.43
Labour	George Francis Sawyer	10,892	48.85	+11.66
Majority		515	2.30	−20.09
Turnout		22,299	64.31	+7.43
Registered electors		34,673		
Unionist hold		Swing	−10.05	

General election 1929: Birmingham Duddeston
Party	Candidate	Votes	%	±%
Labour	George Francis Sawyer	18,204	61.00	+12.15
Unionist	John Burman	11,639	39.00	−12.15
Majority		6,565	22.00	N/A
Turnout		29,843	68.59	+4.28
Registered electors		43,507		
Labour gain from Unionist		Swing	+12.15	

=== Elections in the 1930s ===
General election 1931: Birmingham Duddeston
Party	Candidate	Votes	%	±%
Conservative	Oliver Simmonds	16,332	61.10	+22.10
Labour	George Francis Sawyer	9,789	36.62	−24.38
Communist	Bernard Moore	327	1.22	New
New Party	Jessie Williams	284	1.06	New
Majority		6,543	24.48	N/A
Turnout		26,732	64.43	−4.16
Registered electors		41,492		
Conservative gain from Labour		Swing	+23.24	

General election 1935: Birmingham Duddeston
Party	Candidate	Votes	%	±%
Conservative	Oliver Simmonds	12,146	57.76	−3.34
Labour	George Francis Sawyer	8,884	42.24	+5.62
Majority		3,262	15.52	−8.96
Turnout		21,030	53.72	−10.71
Registered electors		39,144		
Conservative hold		Swing	−4.48	

=== Election in the 1940s ===
General election 1945: Birmingham Duddeston
Party	Candidate	Votes	%	±%
Labour Co-op	Edith Wills	10,745	64.98	+22.74
Conservative	Oliver Simmonds	5,791	35.02	−22.74
Majority		4,954	29.96	N/A
Turnout		16,536	63.49	+9.77
Registered electors		26,047		
Labour Co-op gain from Conservative		Swing	+22.74	
