= Andy King (British politician) =

British politician (1948–2026)

Andrew King

Member of Parliament for Rugby and Kenilworth
- In office 1 May 1997 – 11 April 2005
- Preceded by: Jim Pawsey
- Succeeded by: Jeremy Wright

Personal details
- Born: 14 September 1948 Bellshill, Lanarkshire, Scotland
- Died: 12 October 2026 (aged 78)
- Party: Labour

Andrew King (14 September 1948 – 12 October 2026) was an British Labour Party politician.

== Life and career ==
King was born in Bellshill, Lanarkshire, on 14 September 1948. Educated at Coatbridge Technical College and Hatfield Polytechnic, he worked as a postman and mechanic before becoming a social services manager. He was member of parliament for Rugby and Kenilworth until 2005, having first won the seat in the 1997 general election. King lost his parliamentary seat at the 2005 general election to the Conservative Party candidate Jeremy Wright.

For the 2010 election, Parliamentary constituency boundaries were redrawn, and Rugby became a seat in its own right. On 22 July 2007, King was selected by the Rugby Constituency Labour Party as their prospective parliamentary candidate for the 2010 general election; however, King lost the new Rugby seat to Mark Pawsey, son of former MP Jim Pawsey, whom King had defeated in 1997.

Andy King died on 12 October 2026, aged 78.

Parliament of the United Kingdom
Preceded by Jim Pawsey	Member of Parliament for Rugby and Kenilworth; 1997–2005	Succeeded by Jeremy Wright
