= Richard Verney, 19th Baron Willoughby de Broke =

British peer and conservative politician

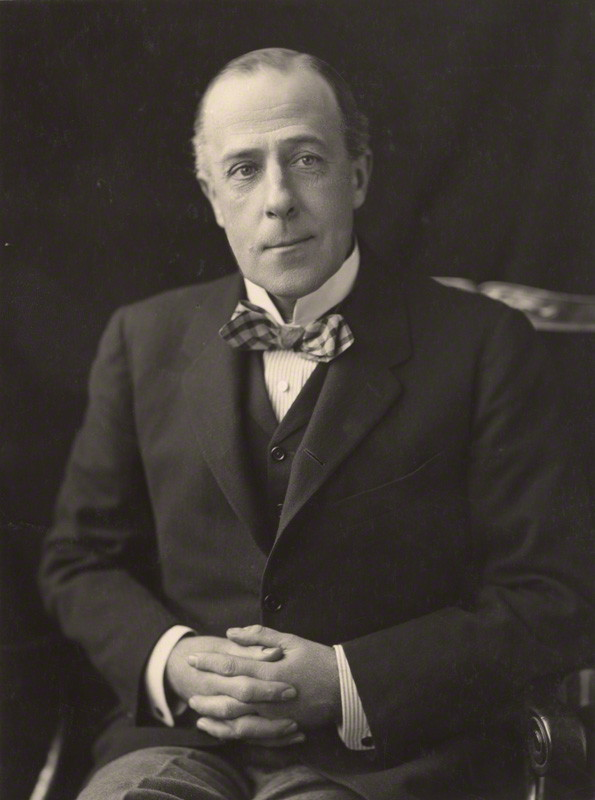
Lord Willoughby de Broke, about 1910

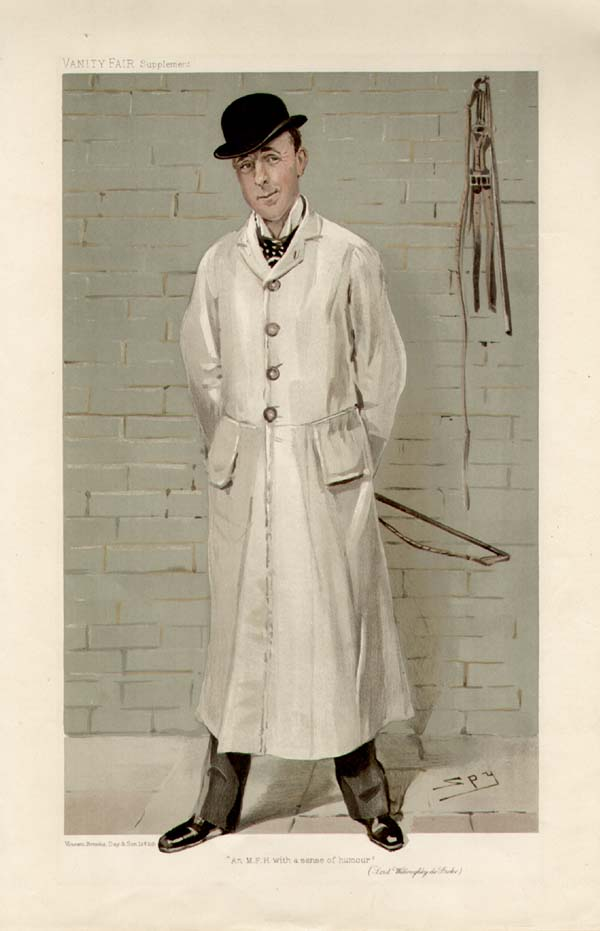
"An MFH with a sense of humour". Caricature by Spy published in Vanity Fair in 1905

Richard Greville Verney, 19th Baron Willoughby de Broke (29 March 1869 (London) – 16 December 1923) was a British peer and conservative politician.

== Life ==
Verney was the son of Colonel Henry Verney, 18th Baron Willoughby de Broke and Geraldine Smith-Barry and educated at Eton College and New College, Oxford. He married Marie Frances Lisette Hanbury, daughter of Charles Addington Hanbury, on 2 July 1895. They had one son, John Henry Peyto Verney, who succeeded him as 20th Baron Willoughby de Broke.

The historian George Dangerfield described Verney as "a genial and sporting young peer, whose face bore a pleasing resemblance to the horse. ... He had quite a gift for writing, thought clearly, and was not more than two hundred years behind his time." He wrote a book on foxhunting called "Hunting the Fox", which was published in 1921.

Verney represented Rugby, Warwickshire as an MP from 1895 to 1900. In 1902 he succeeded his father as 19th Baron Willoughby de Broke and is considered to have succeeded as de jure 26th and 27th Baron Latimer of Corby but did not claim those titles. In the House of Lords, he and Hardinge Giffard, 1st Earl of Halsbury led the "Die-Hards" or Ditchers in opposition to the Parliament Act 1911.

In 1921, Verney sold the family seat, Compton Verney House, to Joseph Watson (d. 1922), a soap manufacturer from Leeds, who was elevated to the peerage in 1922 as 1st Baron Manton of Compton Verney. He retained an estate cottage in Kineton called Fox Cottage, which became his country residence. Upon his death, on 16 December 1923, his title passed to his son, John Henry Peyto Verney. The Vicar of Kineton in his memorial address stated rthe following regarding Verney:

I think you will all agree that there is just one point that stands out before us as we assemble at this Memorial Service—it is this: "We have lost a friend"; if you meet the hunt servants, they will say, "We hunt servants have lost a friend.” If you ask his old domestic servants who were in Compton Verney Chapel this afternoon, they will say just this: "We have lost a friend." If further evidence were needed, perhaps the inscription on the lovely wreath sent by the household, garden, and stable staff at his little hunting box in Kineton expressed it most touchingly of all by these simple words: "It was a pleasure to serve him."

— Vicar of Kineton, Memorial Address for Lord Willoughby de Broke

His autobiography, The Passing Years, was published posthumously in 1924. According to P. J. Waller, the book is "rightly valued for the picture they present of county society. They colour for historians an otherwise empty abstraction, the deferential community, and divest it of unnecessarily scornful associations of the hubristic and menial kind." M. K. Ashby wrote that "in the whole volume of The Passing Years there is not one metaphor which is not drawn from sport or game or weather or the table."

== Publications ==
- Lord Willoughby de Broke, 'The Tory Tradition', National Review (October, 1911), pp. 201–13.
- Lord Willoughby de Broke, The Passing Years (London: Constable, 1924).
- Richard Greville Verney, Lord Willoughby de Broke. Hunting the Fox (Houghton Mifflin Co, 1921)

Parliament of the United Kingdom
Preceded by Henry Peyton Cobb	Member of Parliament for Rugby; 1895 – 1900	Succeeded by Corrie Grant
Peerage of England
Preceded by Henry Verney	Baron Willoughby de Broke; 1902–1923	Succeeded by John Henry Peyto Verney
