= John Burman =

English journalist and politician (1867–1941)

Burman in 1940.

Sir John Bedford Burman, JP (6 October 1867 – 4 March 1941) was Conservative MP for Birmingham Duddeston.

A sometime journalist, he was elected in 1923, re-elected in 1924, but lost the seat to Labour in 1929. He was then Lord Mayor of Birmingham from 1931 to 1932. He received a knighthood in the Birthday Honours for 1936.

His son, John Charles Burman, was Lord Mayor of Birmingham from 1947 to 1949.
