= List of United Kingdom Parliament constituencies (1918–1945) by region =

Between 1918 and 1945, the parliamentary constituencies of the United Kingdom were defined primarily by the Representation of the People Act 1918, which restructured the electoral system in response to post-war social and demographic changes. The Act enfranchised all men over the age of 21 and women over 30 who met minimum property qualifications, significantly expanding the electorate. It also redrew constituency boundaries to reflect population growth and urbanisation following the First World War.

This period saw seven general elections, from 1918 to 1935, conducted using these boundaries. The constituencies remained largely unchanged until the implementation of the Representation of the People Act 1948, which introduced single-member constituencies and equal representation by population, effective from the 1950 general election. The political implications of these reforms, and the evolving role of Parliament during this time, have been analysed by scholars such as Vernon Bogdanor, and documented in reference works by David and Gareth Butler.

== South West (43) ==
=== Cornwall (5) ===
Constituency	1918	1922	1923	1924	1929	1931	1935	1945
Bodmin	Co. Conservative	Liberal	Liberal	Conservative	Liberal	Liberal	Conservative	Conservative
Camborne	Liberal	National Liberal	Independent Liberal	Constitutionalist	Liberal	Conservative	Conservative	Conservative
Cornwall North	Liberal	National Liberal	Liberal	Conservative	Liberal	Liberal	Liberal	Liberal
Penryn and Falmouth	Co. Conservative	Conservative	Liberal	Conservative	Liberal	Conservative	Conservative	Labour
St Ives	Coalition Liberal	Conservative	Liberal	Conservative	Liberal	Liberal National	Liberal National	Liberal National

=== Devon (11) ===
Constituency	1918	1922	1923	1924	1929	1931	1935	1945
Barnstaple	Coalition Liberal	Conservative	Liberal	Conservative	Conservative	Conservative	Liberal	Conservative
Exeter	Co. Conservative	Conservative	Conservative	Conservative	Ind. Conservative	Conservative	Conservative	Conservative
Honiton	Co. Conservative	Conservative	Conservative	Conservative	Conservative	Conservative	Conservative	Conservative
Plymouth Devonport	Co. Conservative	Conservative	Liberal	Liberal	Liberal	Liberal National	Liberal National	Labour
Plymouth Drake	Co. Conservative	Conservative	Conservative	Conservative	Labour	Conservative	Conservative	Labour
Plymouth Sutton	Co. Conservative	Conservative	Conservative	Conservative	Conservative	Conservative	Conservative	Labour
South Molton	Coalition Liberal	Liberal	Liberal	Conservative	Liberal	Liberal National	Liberal National	Liberal National
Tavistock	Co. Conservative	Liberal	Liberal	Conservative	Conservative	Conservative	Conservative	Conservative
Tiverton	Co. Conservative	Conservative	Liberal	Conservative	Conservative	Conservative	Conservative	Conservative
Torquay	Co. Conservative	Conservative	Liberal	Conservative	Conservative	Conservative	Conservative	Conservative
Totnes	Co. Conservative	Conservative	Liberal	Conservative	Conservative	Conservative	Conservative	Conservative

=== Somerset (7) ===
Constituency	1918	1922	1923	1924	1929	1931	1935	1945
Bath	Co. Conservative	Conservative	Liberal	Conservative	Conservative	Conservative	Conservative	Conservative
Bridgwater	Co. Conservative	Conservative	Liberal	Conservative	Conservative	Conservative	Conservative	Ind. Progressive
Frome	Co. Conservative	Conservative	Labour	Conservative	Labour	Conservative	Conservative	Labour
Taunton	Co. Conservative	Liberal	Liberal	Conservative	Conservative	Conservative	Conservative	Labour
Wells	Co. Conservative	Conservative	Liberal	Conservative	Conservative	Conservative	Conservative	Conservative
Weston-super-Mare	Co. Conservative	Conservative	Liberal	Conservative	Conservative	Conservative	Conservative	Conservative
Yeovil	Co. Conservative	Conservative	Conservative	Conservative	Conservative	Conservative	Conservative	Conservative

=== Dorset (4) ===
Constituency	1918	1922	1923	1924	1929	1931	1935	1945
Dorset East	Coalition Liberal	Ind. Conservative	Conservative	Conservative	Liberal	Conservative	Conservative	Conservative
Dorset North	Co. Conservative	National Liberal	Liberal	Conservative	Conservative	Conservative	Conservative	Liberal
Dorset South	Co. Conservative	Conservative	Conservative	Conservative	Conservative	Conservative	Conservative	Conservative
Dorset West	Co. Conservative	Conservative	Conservative	Conservative	Conservative	Conservative	Conservative	Conservative

=== Gloucestershire (11) ===
Constituency	1918	1922	1923	1924	1929	1931	1935	1945
Bristol Central	Co. Conservative	Conservative	Conservative	Conservative	Labour	Conservative	Conservative	Labour
Bristol East	Coalition Liberal	National Liberal	Labour	Labour	Labour	Labour	Labour	Labour
Bristol North	Coalition Liberal	Liberal	Labour	Liberal	Labour	Liberal	Liberal	Labour Co-op
Bristol South	Coalition Liberal	National Liberal	Liberal	Liberal	Labour	Conservative	Labour	Labour
Bristol West	Co. Conservative	Conservative	Conservative	Conservative	Conservative	Conservative	Conservative	Conservative
Cheltenham	Co. Conservative	Conservative	Conservative	Conservative	Conservative	Conservative	Conservative	Ind. Conservative
Cirencester and Tewkesbury	Co. Conservative	Conservative	Conservative	Conservative	Conservative	Conservative	Conservative	Conservative
Forest of Dean	Labour	Labour	Labour	Labour	Labour	National Labour	Labour	Labour
Gloucester	Co. Conservative	Conservative	Conservative	Conservative	Conservative	Conservative	Conservative	Labour
Stroud	Coalition Liberal	Conservative	Liberal	Conservative	Conservative	Conservative	Conservative	Labour
Thornbury	Coalition Liberal	Conservative	Liberal	Conservative	Conservative	Conservative	Conservative	Labour

=== Wiltshire (5) ===
Constituency	1918	1922	1923	1924	1929	1931	1935	1945
Chippenham	Co. Conservative	Liberal	Liberal	Conservative	Conservative	Conservative	Conservative	Conservative
Devizes	Co. Conservative	Conservative	Liberal	Conservative	Conservative	Conservative	Conservative	Conservative
Salisbury	Co. Conservative	Conservative	Liberal	Conservative	Conservative	Conservative	Conservative	Conservative
Swindon	Co. Conservative	Conservative	Conservative	Conservative	Labour	Conservative	Conservative	Labour
Westbury	Co. Conservative	Liberal	Liberal	Conservative	Conservative	Conservative	Conservative	Conservative

== South East (including London) (148; 161 in 1945) ==
=== Oxfordshire (3) ===
Constituency	1918	1922	1923	1924	1929	1931	1935	1945
Banbury	Coalition Liberal	Conservative	Conservative	Conservative	Conservative	Conservative	Conservative	Conservative
Henley	Co. Conservative	Conservative	Conservative	Conservative	Conservative	Conservative	Conservative	Conservative
Oxford	Co. Conservative	Liberal	Liberal	Conservative	Conservative	Conservative	Conservative	Conservative

=== Buckinghamshire (3; 4 in 1945) ===
Constituency	1918	1922	1923	1924	1929	1931	1935	1945
Aylesbury	Co. Conservative	Conservative	Liberal	Conservative	Conservative	Conservative	Conservative	Conservative
Buckingham	Co. Conservative	Conservative	Conservative	Conservative	Conservative	Conservative	Conservative	Labour
Eton and Slough								Labour
Wycombe	Co. Conservative	Conservative	Liberal	Conservative	Conservative	Conservative	Conservative	Labour

=== Berkshire (4) ===
Constituency	1918	1922	1923	1924	1929	1931	1935	1945
Abingdon	Co. Conservative	Conservative	Liberal	Conservative	Conservative	Conservative	Conservative	Conservative
Newbury	Co. Conservative	Conservative	Liberal	Conservative	Conservative	Conservative	Conservative	Conservative
Reading	Co. Conservative	Conservative	Labour	Conservative	Labour	Conservative	Conservative	Labour
Windsor	Co. Conservative	Conservative	Conservative	Conservative	Conservative	Conservative	Conservative	Conservative

=== Hampshire (12) ===
Constituency	1918	1922	1923	1924	1929	1931	1935	1945
Aldershot	Co. Conservative	Conservative	Conservative	Conservative	Conservative	Conservative	Conservative	Conservative
Basingstoke	Co. Conservative	Conservative	Liberal	Conservative	Conservative	Conservative	Conservative	Conservative
Bournemouth	National Party	Conservative	Conservative	Conservative	Conservative	Conservative	Conservative	Conservative
Fareham	Co. Conservative	Conservative	Conservative	Conservative	Conservative	Conservative	Conservative	Conservative
New Forest and Christchurch	Co. Conservative	Conservative	Conservative	Conservative	Conservative	Conservative	Conservative	Conservative
Petersfield	Co. Conservative	Conservative	Conservative	Conservative	Conservative	Conservative	Conservative	Conservative
Portsmouth Central	Liberal	Conservative	Liberal	Conservative	Labour	Conservative	Conservative	Labour
Portsmouth North	Co. Conservative	Conservative	Conservative	Conservative	Conservative	Conservative	Conservative	Labour
Portsmouth South	Co. Conservative	Conservative	Conservative	Conservative	Conservative	Conservative	Conservative	Conservative
Southampton (Two members)	Coalition Liberal	Conservative	Conservative	Conservative	Labour	Liberal National	Liberal National	Labour
Southampton (Two members)	Coalition Liberal	Conservative	Conservative	Conservative	Labour	Conservative	Conservative	Labour
Winchester	Co. Conservative	Conservative	Conservative	Conservative	Conservative	Conservative	Conservative	Labour

=== Isle of Wight (1) ===
Constituency	1918	1922	1923	1924	1929	1931	1935	1945
Isle of Wight	Co. Conservative	Liberal	Liberal	Conservative	Conservative	Conservative	Conservative	Conservative

=== Surrey (12; 14 in 1945) ===
Constituency	1918	1922	1923	1924	1929	1931	1935	1945
Chertsey	Co. Conservative	Conservative	Conservative	Conservative	Conservative	Conservative	Conservative	Conservative
Croydon North	Co. Conservative	Conservative	Conservative	Conservative	Conservative	Conservative	Conservative	Conservative
Croydon South	Co. Conservative	Conservative	Conservative	Conservative	Conservative	Conservative	Conservative	Labour
Epsom	Co. Conservative	Conservative	Conservative	Conservative	Conservative	Conservative	Conservative	Conservative
Farnham	Co. Conservative	Conservative	Conservative	Conservative	Conservative	Conservative	Conservative	Conservative
Guildford	Co. Conservative	Conservative	Conservative	Conservative	Conservative	Conservative	Conservative	Conservative
Kingston upon Thames	Co. Conservative	Conservative	Conservative	Conservative	Conservative	Conservative	Conservative	Conservative
Mitcham	Co. Conservative	Conservative	Conservative	Conservative	Conservative	Conservative	Conservative	Labour
Carshalton								Conservative
Sutton and Cheam								Conservative
Reigate	Co. Conservative	Conservative	Conservative	Conservative	Conservative	Conservative	Conservative	Conservative
Richmond (Surrey)	Co. Conservative	Ind. Conservative	Conservative	Conservative	Conservative	Conservative	Conservative	Conservative
Surrey East	Co. Conservative	Conservative	Conservative	Conservative	Conservative	Conservative	Conservative	Conservative
Wimbledon	Co. Conservative	Conservative	Conservative	Conservative	Conservative	Conservative	Conservative	Labour

=== Sussex (9; 10 in 1945) ===
Constituency	1918	1922	1923	1924	1929	1931	1935	1945
Brighton (Two members)	Co. Conservative	Conservative	Conservative	Conservative	Conservative	Conservative	Conservative	Conservative
Brighton (Two members)	Co. Conservative	Conservative	Conservative	Conservative	Conservative	Conservative	Conservative	Conservative
Chichester	Co. Conservative	Conservative	Liberal	Conservative	Conservative	Conservative	Conservative	Conservative
Eastbourne	Co. Conservative	Conservative	Conservative	Conservative	Conservative	Conservative	Conservative	Conservative
East Grinstead	Co. Conservative	Conservative	Conservative	Conservative	Conservative	Conservative	Conservative	Conservative
Hastings	Co. Conservative	Conservative	Conservative	Conservative	Conservative	Conservative	Conservative	Conservative
Horsham and Worthing	Co. Conservative	Conservative	Conservative	Conservative	Conservative	Conservative	Conservative	N/A
Horsham								Conservative
Worthing								Conservative
Lewes	Co. Conservative	Conservative	Conservative	Conservative	Conservative	Conservative	Conservative	Conservative
Rye	Co. Conservative	Conservative	Conservative	Conservative	Conservative	Conservative	Conservative	Conservative

=== Kent (15; 17 in 1945) ===
Constituency	1918	1922	1923	1924	1929	1931	1935	1945
Ashford	Co. Conservative	Conservative	Conservative	Conservative	Liberal	Conservative	Conservative	Conservative
Bexley								Labour
Orpington								Conservative
Bromley	Co. Conservative	Conservative	Conservative	Conservative	Conservative	Conservative	Conservative	Conservative
Canterbury	Co. Conservative	Conservative	Conservative	Conservative	Conservative	Conservative	Conservative	Conservative
Chatham	Co. Conservative	Conservative	Conservative	Conservative	Conservative	Labour	Conservative	Labour
Chislehurst	Co. Conservative	Conservative	Conservative	Conservative	Conservative	Conservative	Conservative	Labour
Dartford	Coalition Liberal	Constitutionalist	Labour	Conservative	Labour	Conservative	Conservative	Labour Co-op
Dover	Co. Conservative	Conservative	Conservative	Conservative	Conservative	Conservative	Conservative	Labour
Faversham	Co. Conservative	Conservative	Conservative	Conservative	Conservative	Conservative	Conservative	Labour
Gillingham	Co. Conservative	Conservative	Conservative	Conservative	Conservative	Conservative	Conservative	Labour
Gravesend	Co. Conservative	Conservative	Labour	Conservative	Conservative	Conservative	Conservative	Labour
Hythe	Co. Conservative	Conservative	Conservative	Conservative	Conservative	Conservative	Conservative	Conservative
Isle of Thanet	Co. Conservative	Conservative	Conservative	Conservative	Conservative	Conservative	Conservative	Conservative
Maidstone	Co. Conservative	Conservative	Conservative	Conservative	Conservative	Conservative	Conservative	Conservative
Sevenoaks	Co. Conservative	Conservative	Liberal	Conservative	Conservative	Conservative	Conservative	Conservative
Tonbridge	Co. Conservative	Conservative	Conservative	Conservative	Conservative	Conservative	Conservative	Conservative

=== Middlesex (17; 24 in 1945) ===
Constituency	1918	1922	1923	1924	1929	1931	1935	1945
Acton	Co. Conservative	Conservative	Conservative	Conservative	Labour	Conservative	Conservative	Labour
Brentford and Chiswick	Co. Conservative	Conservative	Conservative	Conservative	Conservative	Conservative	Conservative	Labour
Ealing	Co. Conservative	Conservative	Conservative	Conservative	Conservative	Conservative	Conservative	N/A
Ealing East								Conservative
Ealing West								Labour
Edmonton	Co. Conservative	Labour	Labour	Labour	Labour	Conservative	Labour Co-op	Labour
Enfield	Co. Conservative	Conservative	Labour	Conservative	Labour	Conservative	Conservative	Labour
Finchley	Co. Conservative	Conservative	Liberal	Conservative	Conservative	Conservative	Conservative	Conservative
Harrow	Co. Conservative	Independent	Independent	Conservative	Conservative	Conservative	Conservative	N/A
Harrow East								Labour
Harrow West								Conservative
Hendon	Co. Conservative	Conservative	Conservative	Conservative	Conservative	Conservative	Conservative	N/A
Hendon North								Labour
Hendon South								Conservative
Heston and Isleworth								Labour
Hornsey	Co. Conservative	Conservative	Conservative	Conservative	Conservative	Conservative	Conservative	Conservative
Southall								Labour
Spelthorne	Liberal	Conservative	Conservative	Conservative	Conservative	Conservative	Conservative	Labour
Tottenham North	Co. Conservative	Co-operative	Co-operative	Co-operative	Labour Co-op	Conservative	Labour Co-op	Labour Co-op
Tottenham South	Conservative	Conservative	Labour	Conservative	Labour	National Labour	Labour	Labour
Twickenham	Co. Conservative	Conservative	Conservative	Conservative	Conservative	Conservative	Conservative	Conservative
Uxbridge	Co. Conservative	Conservative	Conservative	Conservative	Conservative	Conservative	Conservative	Labour Co-op
Wembley North								Labour
Wembley South								Labour
Willesden East	Co. Conservative	Conservative	Liberal	Conservative	Conservative	Conservative	Conservative	Labour
Willesden West	Co. Conservative	Conservative	Labour	Labour	Labour	Conservative	Labour	Labour
Wood Green	Co. Conservative	Conservative	Conservative	Conservative	Conservative	Conservative	Conservative	Conservative

=== County of London (62) ===
Constituency	1918	1922	1923	1924	1929	1931	1935	1945
Balham and Tooting	Co. Conservative	Conservative	Conservative	Conservative	Conservative	Conservative	Conservative	Labour
Battersea North	Coalition Liberal	Communist	Liberal	Communist	Labour	Conservative	Labour	Labour
Battersea South	Co. Conservative	Conservative	Conservative	Conservative	Labour	Conservative	Conservative	Labour Co-op
Bermondsey West	Liberal	Labour	Liberal	Labour	Labour	Labour	Labour	Labour
Bethnal Green North-East	Coalition Liberal	Liberal	Labour	Labour	Liberal	Liberal	Labour Co-op	Labour Co-op
Bethnal Green South-West	Co. Conservative	Liberal	Liberal	Liberal	Liberal	Liberal	Liberal	Labour Co-op
Bow and Bromley	Co. Conservative	Labour	Labour	Labour	Labour	Labour	Labour	Labour
Brixton	Co. Conservative	Conservative	Liberal	Conservative	Conservative	Conservative	Conservative	Labour
Camberwell North	Co. Conservative	Labour	Labour	Labour	Labour	Conservative	Labour	Labour
Camberwell North-West	Coalition Liberal	National Liberal	Liberal	Conservative	Labour	Conservative	Conservative	Labour
Chelsea	Co. Conservative	Conservative	Conservative	Conservative	Conservative	Conservative	Conservative	Conservative
Clapham	Co. Conservative	Conservative	Conservative	Conservative	Conservative	Conservative	Conservative	Labour
Deptford	Labour	Labour	Labour	Labour	Labour	Conservative	Labour Co-op	Labour
Dulwich	Co. Conservative	Conservative	Conservative	Conservative	Conservative	Conservative	Conservative	Labour
Finsbury	Co. Conservative	Conservative	Labour	Labour	Labour	National Labour	Labour Co-op	Labour
Fulham East	Co. Conservative	Conservative	Conservative	Conservative	Conservative	Conservative	Conservative	Labour
Fulham West	Co. Conservative	Conservative	Conservative	Conservative	Labour	Conservative	Conservative	Labour
Greenwich	Co. Conservative	Liberal	Labour	Conservative	Labour	Conservative	Conservative	Labour
Hackney Central	Coalition Liberal	National Liberal	Liberal	Conservative	Labour	Conservative	Labour	Labour
Hackney North	Co. Conservative	Conservative	Liberal	Conservative	Conservative	Conservative	Conservative	Labour
Hackney South	Independent	Conservative	Labour	Liberal	Labour	Conservative	Labour	Labour
Hammersmith North	Co. Conservative	Conservative	Labour	Conservative	Labour	Conservative	Labour	Independent Labour
Hammersmith South	Co. Conservative	Conservative	Conservative	Conservative	Labour Co-op	Conservative	Conservative	Labour Co-op
Hampstead	Co. Conservative	Conservative	Conservative	Conservative	Conservative	Conservative	Conservative	Conservative
Holborn	Co. Conservative	Conservative	Conservative	Conservative	Conservative	Conservative	Conservative	Conservative
Islington East	Co. Conservative	Conservative	Liberal	Conservative	Labour	Conservative	Conservative	Labour
Islington North	Co. Conservative	Conservative	Conservative	Conservative	Labour	Conservative	Conservative	Labour
Islington South	Co. Conservative	Conservative	Labour	Labour	Labour	Conservative	Labour	Labour
Islington West	Co. Conservative	Conservative	Labour	Labour	Labour	Conservative	Labour	Labour
Kennington	Coalition Liberal	Conservative	Labour	Conservative	Labour	Conservative	Conservative	Labour
Kensington North	Co. Conservative	Conservative	Conservative	Conservative	Labour	Conservative	Conservative	Labour
Kensington South	Co. Conservative	Conservative	Conservative	Conservative	Conservative	Conservative	Conservative	Conservative
Lambeth North	Liberal	Liberal	Liberal	Liberal	Labour	Liberal	Labour	Labour
Lewisham East	Co. Conservative	Conservative	Conservative	Conservative	Conservative	Conservative	Conservative	Labour
Lewisham West	Co. Conservative	Conservative	Conservative	Conservative	Conservative	Conservative	Conservative	Labour
City of London (Two members)	Co. Conservative	Conservative	Conservative	Conservative	Conservative	Conservative	Conservative	National
City of London (Two members)	Co. Conservative	Conservative	Conservative	Conservative	Conservative	Conservative	Conservative	Conservative
Norwood	Co. Conservative	Conservative	Conservative	Conservative	Conservative	Conservative	Conservative	Labour
Paddington North	Co. Conservative	Conservative	Conservative	Conservative	Conservative	Conservative	Conservative	Labour
Paddington South	Co. Conservative	Conservative	Conservative	Conservative	Conservative	Conservative	Conservative	Conservative
Peckham	Coalition Liberal	Conservative	Conservative	Labour	Labour	Conservative	Conservative	Labour
Poplar South	Coalition Liberal	Labour	Labour	Labour	Labour	Labour	Labour	Labour
Putney	Co. Conservative	Conservative	Conservative	Conservative	Conservative	Conservative	Conservative	Conservative
Rotherhithe	Co. Conservative	Conservative	Labour	Labour	Labour	Conservative	Labour	Labour
St Marylebone	Co. Conservative	Conservative	Conservative	Conservative	Conservative	Conservative	Conservative	Conservative
St Pancras North	Co. Conservative	Conservative	Labour	Conservative	Labour	Conservative	Conservative	Labour
St Pancras South East	Conservative	Conservative	Labour	Conservative	Labour	Conservative	Conservative	Labour
St Pancras South West	Co. Conservative	Conservative	Conservative	Conservative	Labour	Conservative	Conservative	Labour
Shoreditch	Coalition Liberal	National Liberal	Labour	Labour	Labour	Liberal National	Labour	Labour
Southwark Central	Coalition Liberal	National Liberal	Liberal	Labour	Labour	National	Labour	Labour
Southwark North	Coalition Liberal	National Liberal	Labour	Labour	Labour	Liberal National	Liberal National	Labour
Southwark South East	Coalition Liberal	National Liberal	Labour	Labour	Labour	Conservative	Labour	Labour
Stepney Limehouse	Coalition Liberal	Labour	Labour	Labour	Labour	Labour	Labour	Labour
Stepney Mile End	Co. Conservative	Conservative	Labour	Labour	Labour	Conservative	Labour	Communist
Stoke Newington	Co. Conservative	Conservative	Liberal	Conservative	Conservative	Conservative	Conservative	Labour
Streatham	Co. Conservative	Conservative	Conservative	Conservative	Conservative	Conservative	Conservative	Conservative
Wandsworth Central	Conservative	Conservative	Conservative	Conservative	Labour	Conservative	Conservative	Labour
Westminster Abbey	Conservative	Conservative	Conservative	Conservative	Conservative	Conservative	Conservative	Conservative
Westminster St George's	Ind. Conservative	Ind. Conservative	Conservative	Conservative	Conservative	Conservative	Conservative	Conservative
Whitechapel and St Georges	Liberal	Labour	Labour	Labour	Labour	Liberal	Labour	Labour
Woolwich East	Labour	Labour	Labour	Labour	Labour	Labour	Labour	Labour
Woolwich West	Co. Conservative	Conservative	Conservative	Conservative	Conservative	Conservative	Conservative	Labour

See https://commons.wikimedia.org/wiki/Category:Locator_maps_of_former_parliamentary_constituencies_of_England_1917

== East Anglia (55; 62 in 1945) ==
=== Bedfordshire (3) ===
Constituency	1918	1922	1923	1924	1929	1931	1935	1945
Bedford	Coalition Liberal	Conservative	Conservative	Conservative	Conservative	Conservative	Conservative	Labour
Bedfordshire Mid	Co. Conservative	Liberal	Liberal	Conservative	Liberal	Conservative	Conservative	Conservative
Luton	Coalition Liberal	Conservative	Liberal	Conservative	Liberal	Liberal National	Liberal National	Labour

=== Hertfordshire (5; 6 in 1945) ===
Constituency	1918	1922	1923	1924	1929	1931	1935	1945
Hemel Hempstead	Co. Conservative	Conservative	Liberal	Conservative	Conservative	Conservative	Conservative	Conservative
Hertford	Silver Badge	Conservative	Conservative	Conservative	Conservative	Conservative	Conservative	Conservative
Hitchin	Co. Conservative	Conservative	Conservative	Conservative	Conservative	Conservative	Conservative	Labour
St Albans	Co. Conservative	Conservative	Conservative	Conservative	Conservative	Conservative	Conservative	Labour
Barnet								Labour
Watford	Co. Conservative	Conservative	Conservative	Conservative	Conservative	Conservative	Conservative	Labour

=== Huntingdonshire (1) ===
Constituency	1918	1922	1923	1924	1929	1931	1935	1945
Huntingdonshire	Co. Conservative	Conservative	Liberal	Conservative	Liberal	Liberal National	Liberal National	Liberal National

=== Cambridgeshire (2) ===
Constituency	1918	1922	1923	1924	1929	1931	1935	1945
Cambridge	Co. Conservative	Conservative	Conservative	Conservative	Conservative	Conservative	Conservative	Labour
Cambridgeshire	Coalition Liberal	Conservative	Conservative	Conservative	Conservative	Conservative	Conservative	Labour

=== Isle of Ely (1) ===
Constituency	1918	1922	1923	1924	1929	1931	1935	1945
Isle of Ely	Coalition Liberal	Conservative	Liberal	Conservative	Liberal	Liberal	Liberal	Conservative

=== Norfolk (8) ===
Constituency	1918	1922	1923	1924	1929	1931	1935	1945
Great Yarmouth	Co. Conservative	Liberal	Liberal	Conservative	Liberal	Liberal National	Liberal National	Labour
King's Lynn	Co. Conservative	Conservative	Liberal	Conservative	Conservative	Conservative	Conservative	Labour
Norfolk East	Co. Conservative	Conservative	Liberal	Conservative	Liberal	Liberal National	Liberal National	Liberal National
Norfolk North	Coalition Independent	Labour	Labour	Labour	Labour	Conservative	Conservative	Labour
Norfolk South	Liberal	Conservative	Labour	Conservative	Conservative	Conservative	Conservative	Labour
Norfolk South West	Coalition Liberal	Liberal	Conservative	Conservative	Labour	Conservative	Conservative	Labour
Norwich (Two members)	Liberal	National Liberal	Labour	Liberal	Liberal	Liberal National	Liberal National	Labour
Norwich (Two members)	Coalition Labour	Independent	Labour	Conservative	Labour	Conservative	Conservative	Labour

=== Suffolk (6) ===
Constituency	1918	1922	1923	1924	1929	1931	1935	1945
Bury St Edmunds	Co. Conservative	Conservative	Conservative	Conservative	Conservative	Conservative	Conservative	Conservative
Eye	Coalition Liberal	Liberal	Conservative	Conservative	Liberal	Liberal National	Liberal National	Liberal
Ipswich	Co. Conservative	Conservative	Labour	Conservative	Conservative	Conservative	Conservative	Labour
Lowestoft	Coalition Liberal	Conservative	Conservative	Conservative	Conservative	Conservative	Conservative	Labour
Sudbury	Liberal	Conservative	Liberal	Conservative	Conservative	Conservative	Conservative	Labour
Woodbridge	Co. Conservative	Conservative	Conservative	Conservative	Conservative	Conservative	Conservative	Conservative

=== Essex (20; 26 in 1945) ===
Constituency	1918	1922	1923	1924	1929	1931	1935	1945
Chelmsford	Co. Conservative	Conservative	Liberal	Conservative	Conservative	Conservative	Conservative	Common Wealth
Colchester	Co. Conservative	Conservative	Conservative	Conservative	Conservative	Conservative	Conservative	Labour
East Ham North	Coalition Liberal	Conservative	Labour	Conservative	Labour	Conservative	Conservative	Labour Co-op
East Ham South	Coalition NDP	Co-operative	Co-operative	Co-operative	Labour Co-op	Conservative	Labour Co-op	Labour Co-op
Epping	Co. Conservative	Conservative	Conservative	Constitutionalist	Conservative	Conservative	Conservative	Labour
Essex South East	Co. Conservative	Conservative	Labour	Conservative	Labour	Conservative	Conservative	Labour
Harwich	Co. Conservative	Liberal	Liberal	Conservative	Liberal	Liberal National	Liberal National	Liberal National
Ilford	Co. Conservative	Conservative	Conservative	Conservative	Conservative	Conservative	Conservative	
Ilford North								Labour Co-op
Ilford South								Labour
Leyton East	Coalition Liberal	Conservative	Labour	Conservative	Labour	Conservative	Conservative	Labour
Leyton West	Co. Conservative	Conservative	Conservative	Conservative	Labour	Conservative	Labour	Labour
Maldon	Co. Conservative	Conservative	Labour	Conservative	Conservative	Conservative	Conservative	Labour
Romford	Coalition Liberal	National Liberal	Conservative	Conservative	Labour	Conservative	Labour	Labour
Barking								Labour
Dagenham								Labour
Hornchurch								Labour
Saffron Walden	Liberal	Conservative	Conservative	Conservative	Conservative	Conservative	Conservative	Conservative
Southend-on-Sea	Co. Conservative	Conservative	Conservative	Conservative	Conservative	Conservative	Conservative	Conservative
Thurrock								Labour
Walthamstow East	Co. Conservative	Conservative	Conservative	Constitutionalist	Labour	Conservative	Conservative	Labour
Walthamstow West	Coalition NDP	Labour	Labour	Liberal	Labour	Labour	Labour	Labour
West Ham Plaistow	Labour	Labour	Labour	Labour	Labour	Labour	Labour	Labour
West Ham Silvertown	National Socialist	Labour	Labour	Labour	Labour	Labour	Labour	Labour
West Ham Stratford	Co. Conservative	Labour	Labour	Labour	Labour	Labour	Labour	Labour
West Ham Upton	Co. Conservative	Conservative	Labour	Conservative	Labour	Conservative	Labour	Labour
Woodford								Conservative

== West Midlands (55; 58 in 1945) ==
=== Shropshire (4) ===
Constituency	1918	1922	1923	1924	1929	1931	1935	1945
Ludlow	Co. Conservative	Conservative	Conservative	Conservative	Conservative	Conservative	Conservative	Conservative
Oswestry	Co. Conservative	Conservative	Conservative	Conservative	Conservative	Conservative	Conservative	Conservative
Shrewsbury	Co. Conservative	Conservative	Liberal	Conservative	Conservative	Conservative	Conservative	Conservative
The Wrekin	Coalition Liberal	Conservative	Labour	Conservative	Labour	Conservative	Conservative	Labour

=== Staffordshire (18) ===
Constituency	1918	1922	1923	1924	1929	1931	1935	1945
Burslem	Labour	Labour	Liberal	Labour	Labour	Conservative	Labour	Labour
Burton	Co. Conservative	Conservative	Conservative	Conservative	Conservative	Conservative	Conservative	Labour
Cannock	Coalition Labour	Labour	Labour	Labour	Labour	Conservative	Labour	Labour
Hanley	Coalition NDP	Labour	Labour	Labour	Labour	Conservative	Labour	Labour
Kingswinford	Labour	Labour	Labour	Labour	Labour	Conservative	Labour	Labour
Leek	Labour	Labour	Labour	Labour	Labour	Conservative	Labour	Labour
Lichfield	Coalition Liberal	National Liberal	Labour	Conservative	Labour	National Labour	National Labour	Labour
Newcastle-under-Lyme	Liberal	Labour	Labour	Labour	Labour	Labour	Labour	Labour
Smethwick	Labour	Labour	Labour	Labour	Labour	Conservative	Conservative	Labour
Stafford	Co. Conservative	Conservative	Conservative	Conservative	Conservative	Conservative	Conservative	Labour
Stoke-on-Trent	Coalition Liberal	National Liberal	Liberal	Constitutionalist	Labour	Conservative	Labour	Labour
Stone	Co. Conservative	Conservative	Conservative	Conservative	Conservative	Conservative	Conservative	Conservative
Walsall	National Party	Liberal	Liberal	Conservative	Labour	Liberal	Liberal National	Labour
Wednesbury	Labour	Labour	Labour	Labour	Labour	Conservative	Labour	Labour
West Bromwich	Labour	Labour	Labour	Labour	Labour	Conservative	Labour	Labour
Wolverhampton Bilston	Co. Conservative	Conservative	Conservative	Labour	Labour	Conservative	Conservative	Labour Co-op
Wolverhampton East	Liberal	Liberal	Liberal	Liberal	Liberal	Liberal	Liberal	Labour
Wolverhampton West	Co. Conservative	Conservative	Conservative	Conservative	Labour	Conservative	Conservative	Labour

=== Herefordshire (2) ===
Constituency	1918	1922	1923	1924	1929	1931	1935	1945
Hereford	Co. Conservative	Conservative	Conservative	Conservative	Liberal	Conservative	Conservative	Conservative
Leominster	Co. Conservative	Conservative	Conservative	Conservative	Conservative	Conservative	Conservative	Conservative

=== Worcestershire (6) ===
Constituency	1918	1922	1923	1924	1929	1931	1935	1945
Bewdley	Co. Conservative	Conservative	Conservative	Conservative	Conservative	Conservative	Conservative	Conservative
Dudley	Co. Conservative	Conservative	Conservative	Conservative	Labour	Conservative	Conservative	Labour
Evesham	Co. Conservative	Conservative	Conservative	Conservative	Conservative	Conservative	Conservative	Conservative
Kidderminster	Co. Conservative	Conservative	Conservative	Conservative	Conservative	Conservative	Conservative	Labour
Stourbridge	Liberal	Conservative	Conservative	Conservative	Labour	Conservative	Conservative	Labour
Worcester	Co. Conservative	Liberal	Conservative	Conservative	Conservative	Conservative	Conservative	Conservative

=== Warwickshire (17; 20 in 1945) ===
Constituency	1918	1922	1923	1924	1929	1931	1935	1945
Birmingham Acock's Green								Labour
Birmingham Aston	Co. Conservative	Conservative	Conservative	Conservative	Labour	Conservative	Conservative	Labour
Birmingham Deritend	Co. Conservative	Conservative	Conservative	Conservative	Labour Co-op	Conservative	Conservative	Labour Co-op
Birmingham Duddeston	Coalition NDP	Conservative	Conservative	Conservative	Labour	Conservative	Conservative	Labour Co-op
Birmingham Edgbaston	Co. Conservative	Conservative	Conservative	Conservative	Conservative	Conservative	Conservative	Conservative
Birmingham Erdington	Co. Conservative	Conservative	Conservative	Conservative	Labour	Conservative	Conservative	Labour
Birmingham Handsworth	Co. Conservative	Conservative	Conservative	Conservative	Conservative	Conservative	Conservative	Conservative
Birmingham King's Norton	Co. Conservative	Conservative	Conservative	Labour	Conservative	Conservative	Conservative	Labour
Birmingham Ladywood	Co. Conservative	Conservative	Conservative	Conservative	Labour	Conservative	Conservative	Labour
Birmingham Moseley	Co. Conservative	Conservative	Conservative	Conservative	Conservative	Conservative	Conservative	Conservative
Birmingham Sparkbrook	Co. Conservative	Conservative	Conservative	Conservative	Conservative	Conservative	Conservative	Labour
Birmingham West	Co. Conservative	Conservative	Conservative	Conservative	Conservative	Conservative	Conservative	Labour
Birmingham Yardley	Co. Conservative	Conservative	Conservative	Conservative	Labour	Conservative	Conservative	Labour
Coventry	Co. Conservative	Conservative	Labour	Conservative	Labour	Conservative	Conservative	N/A
Coventry East								Labour
Coventry West								Labour
Nuneaton	Co. Conservative	Conservative	Liberal	Conservative	Labour	Conservative	Labour	Labour
Rugby	Co. Conservative	Conservative	Liberal	Conservative	Conservative	Conservative	Conservative	Independent
Solihull								Conservative
Sutton Coldfield								Conservative
Tamworth	Co. Conservative	Conservative	Conservative	Conservative	Conservative	Conservative	Conservative	N/A
Warwick and Leamington	Co. Conservative	Conservative	Conservative	Conservative	Conservative	Conservative	Conservative	Conservative

== East Midlands (42) ==
=== Derbyshire (10) ===
Constituency	1918	1922	1923	1924	1929	1931	1935	1945
Belper	Liberal	Liberal	Conservative	Conservative	Labour	Conservative	Conservative	Labour
Chesterfield	Liberal	Liberal	Liberal	Liberal	Labour	Conservative	Labour	Labour
Clay Cross	Coalition Liberal	Labour	Labour	Labour	Labour	Labour	Labour	Labour
Derby (Two members)	Labour	Labour	Labour	Labour	Labour	National Labour	National Labour	Labour
Derby (Two members)	Conservative	Liberal	Labour	Conservative	Labour	Conservative	Conservative	Labour
Derbyshire North East	Liberal	Labour	Labour	Labour	Labour	Conservative	Labour	Labour
Derbyshire South	Coalition Liberal	Conservative	Conservative	Conservative	Labour	Conservative	Conservative	Labour
Derbyshire West	Liberal	Liberal	Conservative	Conservative	Conservative	Conservative	Conservative	Labour
High Peak	Co. Conservative	Conservative	Conservative	Conservative	Conservative	Conservative	Conservative	Conservative
Ilkeston	Coalition Liberal	Labour	Labour	Labour	Labour	National Labour	Labour	Labour

=== Nottinghamshire (9) ===
Constituency	1918	1922	1923	1924	1929	1931	1935	1945
Bassetlaw	Co. Conservative	Conservative	Conservative	Conservative	Labour	National Labour	Labour	Labour
Broxtowe	Labour	Labour	Labour	Labour	Labour	Labour	Labour	Labour
Mansfield	Labour	Liberal	Labour	Labour	Labour	Labour	Labour	Labour
Newark	Co. Conservative	Conservative	Conservative	Conservative	Conservative	Conservative	Conservative	Conservative
Nottingham Central	Co. Conservative	Liberal	Liberal	Conservative	Conservative	Conservative	Conservative	Labour
Nottingham East	Co. Conservative	Conservative	Liberal	Conservative	Liberal	Conservative	Conservative	Labour
Nottingham South	Co. Conservative	Conservative	Conservative	Conservative	Labour	National Labour	National Labour	Labour Co-op
Nottingham West	Labour	Labour	Labour	Labour	Labour	Conservative	Labour	Labour
Rushcliffe	Co. Conservative	Conservative	Conservative	Conservative	Conservative	Conservative	Conservative	Labour

=== Leicestershire (7) ===
Constituency	1918	1922	1923	1924	1929	1931	1935	1945
Bosworth	Coalition Liberal	Conservative	Liberal	Conservative	Liberal	Liberal National	Liberal National	Labour
Harborough	Co. Conservative	Conservative	Liberal	Conservative	Conservative	Conservative	Conservative	Labour
Leicester East	Coalition Liberal	National Liberal	Labour	Conservative	Labour	Conservative	Conservative	Labour
Leicester South	Co. Conservative	Conservative	Liberal	Conservative	Conservative	Conservative	Conservative	Labour
Leicester West	Coalition NDP	Labour	Labour	Labour	Labour	Liberal	National Labour	Labour
Loughborough	Coalition Liberal	National Liberal	Liberal	Conservative	Labour	Conservative	Conservative	Labour
Melton	Co. Conservative	Conservative	Conservative	Conservative	Conservative	Conservative	Conservative	Conservative

=== Lincolnshire and Rutland (9) ===
Constituency	1918	1922	1923	1924	1929	1931	1935	1945
Brigg	Co. Conservative	Conservative	Conservative	Conservative	Labour	Conservative	Labour	Labour
Gainsborough	Co. Conservative	Conservative	Liberal	Conservative	Conservative	Conservative	Conservative	Conservative
Grantham	Co. Conservative	Liberal	Conservative	Conservative	Conservative	Conservative	Conservative	Independent
Grimsby	Co. Conservative	Conservative	Conservative	Conservative	Conservative	Conservative	Conservative	Labour
Holland with Boston	Labour	Labour	Labour	Conservative	Liberal	Liberal National	Liberal National	Liberal National
Horncastle	Co. Conservative	Liberal	Liberal	Conservative	Conservative	Conservative	Conservative	Conservative
Lincoln	Co. Conservative	Conservative	Conservative	Labour	Labour	Conservative	Conservative	Labour
Louth	Co. Conservative	Liberal	Liberal	Conservative	Conservative	Conservative	Conservative	Conservative
Rutland and Stamford	Co. Conservative	Conservative	Conservative	Conservative	Conservative	Conservative	Conservative	Conservative

=== Northamptonshire (5) ===
Constituency	1918	1922	1923	1924	1929	1931	1935	1945
Daventry	Co. Conservative	Conservative	Conservative	Conservative	Speaker (Conservative)	Speaker (Conservative)	Speaker (Conservative)	Conservative
Kettering	Co-operative	Conservative	Co-operative	Conservative	Labour Co-op	Conservative	Conservative	Labour
Northampton	Coalition Liberal	National Liberal	Labour	Conservative	Labour	Conservative	Conservative	Labour
Peterborough	Co. Conservative	Conservative	Conservative	Conservative	Labour	Conservative	Conservative	Labour Co-op
Wellingborough	Labour	National Liberal	Labour	Labour	Labour	Conservative	Conservative	Labour

== North West (83; 85 from 1945) ==
=== Cumberland (5) ===
Constituency	1918	1922	1923	1924	1929	1931	1935	1945
Carlisle	Coalition Liberal	Labour	Labour	Conservative	Labour	Conservative	Conservative	Labour
Cumberland North	Co. Conservative	Conservative	Conservative	Conservative	Conservative	Conservative	Liberal	Liberal
Penrith and Cockermouth	Speaker (Conservative)	Liberal	Conservative	Conservative	Conservative	Conservative	Conservative	Conservative
Whitehaven	Co. Conservative	Labour	Labour	Conservative	Labour	Conservative	Labour	Labour
Workington	Labour	Labour	Labour	Labour	Labour	Labour	Labour	Labour

=== Westmorland (1) ===
Constituency	1918	1922	1923	1924	1929	1931	1935	1945
Westmorland	Co. Conservative	Conservative	Conservative	Conservative	Conservative	Conservative	Conservative	Conservative

=== Lancashire (65; 66 in 1945) ===
Constituency	1918	1922	1923	1924	1929	1931	1935	1945
Accrington	Co. Conservative	Labour	Liberal	Constitutionalist	Labour	Conservative	Conservative	Labour
Ashton-under-Lyne	Co. Conservative	Conservative	Conservative	Conservative	Labour	Conservative	Labour	Labour
Barrow-in-Furness	Conservative	Conservative	Conservative	Labour	Labour	Conservative	Conservative	Labour
Blackburn (Two members)	Coalition Liberal	National Liberal	Liberal	Liberal	Labour	Conservative	Conservative	Labour
Blackburn (Two members)	Co. Conservative	Conservative	Conservative	Conservative	Labour	Conservative	Conservative	Labour
Blackpool	Co. Conservative	Conservative	Liberal	Conservative	Conservative	Conservative	Conservative	N/A
Blackpool North								Conservative
Blackpool South								Conservative
Bolton (Two members)	Labour	Conservative	Conservative	Conservative	Labour	Conservative	Conservative	Labour
Bolton (Two members)	Coalition Liberal	National Liberal	Labour	Conservative	Labour	Conservative	Conservative	Labour
Bootle	Co. Conservative	Liberal	Liberal	Conservative	Labour	Conservative	Conservative	Labour
Burnley	Labour	Labour	Labour	Labour	Labour	Liberal National	Labour	Labour
Bury	Conservative	Conservative	Conservative	Conservative	Conservative	Conservative	Conservative	Conservative
Chorley	Co. Conservative	Conservative	Conservative	Conservative	Conservative	Conservative	Conservative	Labour
Clitheroe	Labour	Conservative	Conservative	Conservative	Conservative	Conservative	Conservative	Labour
Darwen	Co. Conservative	Conservative	Liberal	Conservative	Liberal	Liberal	Conservative	Conservative
Eccles	Co. Conservative	Labour	Labour	Conservative	Labour	Conservative	Conservative	Labour
Farnworth	Conservative	Labour	Labour	Labour	Labour	Conservative	Labour	Labour
Fylde	Co. Conservative	Conservative	Conservative	Conservative	Conservative	Conservative	Conservative	Conservative
Heywood and Radcliffe	Coalition Liberal	National Liberal	Liberal	Constitutionalist	Liberal	Conservative	Conservative	Labour
Ince	Labour	Labour	Labour	Labour	Labour	Labour	Labour	Labour
Lancaster	Co. Conservative	Conservative	Liberal	Conservative	Conservative	Conservative	Conservative	Conservative
Leigh	Liberal	Labour	Labour	Labour	Labour	Labour	Labour	Labour
Liverpool East Toxteth	Co. Conservative	Conservative	Conservative	Conservative	Conservative	Conservative	Conservative	Conservative
Liverpool Edge Hill	Co. Conservative	Conservative	Labour	Labour	Labour	Conservative	Conservative	Labour
Liverpool Everton	Co. Conservative	Conservative	Conservative	Conservative	Labour	Conservative	Labour	Labour
Liverpool Exchange	Co. Conservative	Conservative	Conservative	Conservative	Conservative	Conservative	Conservative	Labour
Liverpool Fairfield	Conservative	Conservative	Conservative	Conservative	Conservative	Conservative	Conservative	Labour
Liverpool Kirkdale	Co. Conservative	Conservative	Conservative	Conservative	Labour	Conservative	Conservative	Labour
Liverpool Scotland	Irish Nationalist	Irish Nationalist	Irish Nationalist	Irish Nationalist	Irish Nationalist	Labour	Labour	Labour
Liverpool Walton	Co. Conservative	Conservative	Conservative	Conservative	Conservative	Conservative	Conservative	Labour
Liverpool Wavertree	Co. Conservative	Conservative	Liberal	Conservative	Conservative	Conservative	Conservative	Conservative
Liverpool West Derby	Co. Conservative	Conservative	Liberal	Conservative	Conservative	Conservative	Conservative	Conservative
Liverpool West Toxteth	Co. Conservative	Conservative	Conservative	Labour	Labour	Conservative	Labour	Labour
Lonsdale	Co. Conservative	Conservative	Liberal	Conservative	Conservative	Conservative	Conservative	Conservative
Manchester Ardwick	Co. Conservative	Labour	Labour	Labour	Labour	Conservative	Labour	Labour
Manchester Blackley	Conservative	Conservative	Liberal	Conservative	Liberal	Conservative	Conservative	Labour
Manchester Clayton	Conservative	Conservative	Labour	Labour	Labour	Conservative	Labour	Labour
Manchester Exchange	Co. Conservative	Conservative	Liberal	Conservative	Conservative	Conservative	Conservative	Labour
Manchester Gorton	Coalition Labour	Labour	Labour	Labour	Labour	Conservative	Labour	Labour
Manchester Hulme	Conservative	Conservative	Conservative	Conservative	Labour	Conservative	Conservative	Labour
Manchester Moss Side	Conservative	Conservative	Labour	Conservative	Conservative	Conservative	Conservative	Labour
Manchester Platting	Labour	Labour	Liberal	Labour	Labour	Conservative	Labour	Labour
Manchester Rusholme	Co. Conservative	Conservative	Liberal	Conservative	Conservative	Conservative	Conservative	Labour
Manchester Withington	Conservative	Conservative	Liberal	Conservative	Liberal	Conservative	Conservative	Conservative
Middleton and Prestwich	Coalition Liberal	National Liberal	Conservative	Conservative	Conservative	Conservative	Conservative	Conservative
Mossley	Coalition Liberal	Independent	Independent	Independent	Labour Co-op	Independent	National	Labour Co-op
Nelson and Colne	Labour	Labour	Labour	Labour	Labour	Conservative	Labour	Labour
Newton	Labour	Labour	Labour	Labour	Labour	Conservative	Labour	Labour
Oldham (Two members)	Coalition Liberal	National Liberal	Liberal	Liberal	Labour	Conservative	Liberal National	Labour
Oldham (Two members)	Co. Conservative	Labour	Labour	Conservative	Labour	Conservative	Conservative	Labour
Ormskirk	Labour	Conservative	Conservative	Conservative	Labour	National Labour	National Labour	Labour
Preston (Two members)	Co. Conservative	Liberal	Liberal	Conservative	Labour	Conservative	Conservative	Labour
Preston (Two members)	Labour	Labour	Labour	Labour	Liberal then Labour	Conservative	Conservative	Labour
Rochdale	Co. Conservative	Labour	Liberal	Labour	Labour	Conservative	Labour	Labour
Rossendale	Co. Conservative	Conservative	Conservative	Conservative	Labour	Conservative	Conservative	Labour
Royton	Co. Conservative	Conservative	Liberal	Conservative	Conservative	Conservative	Conservative	Conservative
St Helens	Labour	Labour	Labour	Labour	Labour	Conservative	Labour	Labour
Salford North	Labour	Labour	Labour	Conservative	Labour	Conservative	Conservative	Labour
Salford South	Co. Conservative	Conservative	Labour	Conservative	Labour	Conservative	Conservative	Labour
Salford West	Conservative	Conservative	Labour	Conservative	Labour	Conservative	Conservative	Labour
Southport	Co. Conservative	Conservative	Liberal	Conservative	Conservative	Conservative	Conservative	Conservative
Stretford	Coalition Liberal	National Liberal	Liberal	Constitutionalist	Independent	Conservative	Conservative	Labour
Warrington	Co. Conservative	Conservative	Labour	Conservative	Labour	Conservative	Conservative	Labour
Waterloo	Co. Conservative	Conservative	Conservative	Conservative	Conservative	Conservative	Conservative	Conservative
Westhoughton	Labour	Labour	Labour	Labour	Labour	Labour	Labour	Labour
Widnes	Co. Conservative	Conservative	Conservative	Conservative	Labour	Conservative	Conservative	Labour
Wigan	Labour	Labour	Labour	Labour	Labour	Labour	Labour	Labour

=== Cheshire (14; 15 in 1945) ===
Constituency	1918	1922	1923	1924	1929	1931	1935	1945
Altrincham	Co. Conservative	Conservative	Liberal	Conservative	Conservative	Conservative	Conservative	N/A
Altrincham and Sale								Conservative
Bucklow								Conservative
Birkenhead East	Co. Conservative	Liberal	Liberal	Conservative	Liberal	Liberal	Liberal	Labour
Birkenhead West	Co. Conservative	Conservative	Labour	Conservative	Labour	Conservative	Conservative	Labour
Chester	Co. Conservative	Conservative	Conservative	Conservative	Conservative	Conservative	Conservative	Conservative
Crewe	Coalition Liberal	Labour	Labour	Conservative	Labour	Conservative	Conservative	Labour
Eddisbury	Co. Conservative	Conservative	Conservative	Conservative	Liberal	Liberal National	Liberal National	Liberal National
Knutsford	Co. Conservative	Conservative	Conservative	Conservative	Conservative	Conservative	Conservative	Conservative
Macclesfield	Co. Conservative	Conservative	Conservative	Conservative	Conservative	Conservative	Conservative	Conservative
Northwich	Co. Conservative	Conservative	Conservative	Conservative	Conservative	Conservative	Conservative	Conservative
Stalybridge and Hyde	Conservative	Conservative	Liberal	Conservative	Labour	Conservative	Conservative	Labour
Stockport (Two members)	Coalition Labour	Conservative	Conservative	Conservative	Labour	Conservative	Conservative	Conservative
Stockport (Two members)	Coalition Liberal	National Liberal	Liberal	Conservative	Conservative	Conservative	Conservative	Conservative
Wallasey	Co. Conservative	Conservative	Conservative	Conservative	Conservative	Conservative	Conservative	Conservative
Wirral	Co. Conservative	Conservative	Liberal	Conservative	Conservative	Conservative	Conservative	Conservative

== North East (28) ==
=== County Durham (18) ===
Constituency	1918	1922	1923	1924	1929	1931	1935	1945
Barnard Castle	Labour	Conservative	Labour	Conservative	Labour	Conservative	Labour	Labour
Bishop Auckland	Labour	Labour	Labour	Labour	Labour	Liberal National	Labour	Labour
Blaydon	Coalition Liberal	Labour	Labour	Labour	Labour	Conservative	Labour	Labour
Chester-le-Street	Labour	Labour	Labour	Labour	Labour	Labour	Labour	Labour
Consett	Liberal	Labour	Labour	Labour	Labour	Liberal National	Labour	Labour
Darlington	Co. Conservative	Conservative	Conservative	Conservative	Labour	Conservative	Conservative	Labour
Durham	Co. Conservative	Labour	Labour	Labour	Labour	Liberal	Labour	Labour
Gateshead	Co. Conservative	Labour	Liberal	Labour	Labour	Liberal National	Liberal National	Labour
The Hartlepools	Conservative	Liberal	Liberal	Conservative	Conservative	Conservative	Conservative	Labour
Houghton-le-Spring	Labour	Labour	Labour	Labour	Labour	Conservative	Labour	Labour
Jarrow	Coalition Liberal	Labour	Labour	Labour	Labour	Conservative	Labour	Labour
Seaham	Liberal	Labour	Labour	Labour	Labour	National Labour	Labour	Labour
Sedgefield	Co. Conservative	Labour	Conservative	Conservative	Labour	Conservative	Labour	Labour
South Shields	Coalition Liberal	Liberal	Liberal	Liberal	Labour	Liberal	Labour	Labour
Spennymoor	Liberal	Labour	Labour	Labour	Labour	Labour	Labour	Labour
Stockton-on-Tees	Coalition Liberal	National Liberal	Liberal	Conservative	Labour	Conservative	Conservative	Labour
Sunderland (Two members)	Coalition Liberal	Conservative	Conservative	Conservative	Labour	Conservative	Liberal National	Labour
Sunderland (Two members)	Conservative	Conservative	Conservative	Conservative	Labour	Conservative	Conservative	Labour

=== Northumberland (10) ===
Constituency	1918	1922	1923	1924	1929	1931	1935	1945
Berwick-upon-Tweed	Liberal	National Liberal	Conservative	Conservative	Conservative	Conservative	Liberal	Conservative
Hexham	Co. Conservative	Conservative	Liberal	Conservative	Conservative	Conservative	Conservative	Conservative
Morpeth	Labour	Labour	Labour	Labour	Labour	Conservative	Labour	Labour
Newcastle upon Tyne Central	Co. Conservative	Labour	Labour	Labour	Labour	Conservative	Conservative	Labour
Newcastle upon Tyne East	Coalition Liberal	Labour	Liberal	Labour	Liberal	Liberal National	Liberal National	Labour
Newcastle upon Tyne North	Co. Conservative	Conservative	Conservative	Conservative	Conservative	Conservative	Conservative	Conservative
Newcastle upon Tyne West	Coalition Liberal	Labour	Liberal	Labour	Labour	Conservative	Conservative	Labour
Tynemouth	Co. Conservative	Conservative	Conservative	Conservative	Conservative	Conservative	Conservative	Labour
Wallsend	Coalition NDP	Labour	Labour	Labour	Labour	Conservative	Conservative	Labour
Wansbeck	Coalition Liberal	Labour	Labour	Labour	Labour	Conservative	Conservative	Labour

== Yorkshire (57) ==
=== York (1) ===
Constituency	1918	1922	1923	1924	1929	1931	1935	1945
York	Co. Conservative	Conservative	Conservative	Conservative	Labour	Conservative	Conservative	Labour

=== East Riding (7) ===
Constituency	1918	1922	1923	1924	1929	1931	1935	1945
Buckrose	Coalition Liberal	Conservative	Conservative	Conservative	Conservative	Conservative	Conservative	Liberal
Holderness	Co. Conservative	Liberal	Conservative	Conservative	Conservative	Conservative	Conservative	Conservative
Howdenshire	Co. Conservative	Conservative	Conservative	Conservative	Conservative	Conservative	Conservative	Conservative
Kingston upon Hull Central	Co. Conservative	Liberal	Liberal	Liberal	Labour	Conservative	Labour	Labour
Kingston upon Hull East	Co. Conservative	Conservative	Conservative	Conservative	Labour	Conservative	Labour	Labour
Kingston upon Hull North West	Conservative	Conservative	Conservative	Conservative	Conservative	Conservative	Conservative	Labour
Kingston upon Hull South West	Liberal	Liberal	Liberal	Conservative	Labour	Conservative	Conservative	Labour

=== North Riding (6) ===
Constituency	1918	1922	1923	1924	1929	1931	1935	1945
Cleveland	Co. Conservative	Conservative	Liberal	Conservative	Labour	Conservative	Conservative	Labour
Middlesbrough East	Liberal	Labour	Liberal	Labour	Labour	Liberal	Labour	Labour
Middlesbrough West	Liberal	Liberal	Liberal	Liberal	Liberal	Liberal	Liberal	Labour
Richmond (Yorks)	Co. Conservative	Conservative	Conservative	Conservative	Conservative	Conservative	Conservative	Conservative
Scarborough and Whitby	Co. Conservative	Conservative	Conservative	Conservative	Conservative	Conservative	Conservative	Conservative
Thirsk and Malton	Co. Conservative	Conservative	Conservative	Conservative	Conservative	Conservative	Conservative	Conservative

=== West Riding (43) ===
Constituency	1918	1922	1923	1924	1929	1931	1935	1945
Barkston Ash	Co. Conservative	Conservative	Conservative	Conservative	Conservative	Conservative	Conservative	Conservative
Barnsley	Coalition Liberal	Labour	Labour	Labour	Labour	Liberal National	Labour	Labour
Batley and Morley	Coalition Liberal	Labour	Labour	Liberal	Labour	Conservative	Labour	Labour
Bradford Central	Co. Conservative	Labour	Labour	Conservative	Labour	Conservative	Labour	Labour
Bradford East	Coalition NDP	Labour	Labour	Liberal	Labour	Conservative	Conservative	Labour
Bradford North	Co. Conservative	Conservative	Liberal	Conservative	Labour	Conservative	Conservative	Labour
Bradford South	Co. Conservative	Liberal	Liberal	Co-operative	Labour Co-op	Liberal	Liberal	Labour Co-op
Colne Valley	Coalition Liberal	Labour	Labour	Labour	Labour	Liberal	Labour	Labour
Dewsbury	Co. Conservative	Labour	Liberal	Labour	Labour	Liberal	Labour	Labour
Doncaster	Coalition Liberal	Labour	Labour	Labour	Labour	Conservative	Labour	Labour
Don Valley	Coalition NDP	Labour	Labour	Labour	Labour	Labour	Labour	Labour
Elland	Co. Conservative	Labour	Liberal	Labour	Labour	Conservative	Conservative	Labour
Halifax	Coalition Liberal	Liberal	Liberal	Liberal	Labour	Conservative	Conservative	Labour
Hemsworth	Labour	Labour	Labour	Labour	Labour	Labour	Labour	Labour
Huddersfield	Coalition Liberal	Liberal	Labour	Labour	Labour	Liberal National	Liberal National	Labour
Keighley	Co. Conservative	Labour	Liberal	Labour	Labour	Conservative	Labour	Labour
Leeds Central	Coalition Liberal	Conservative	Conservative	Conservative	Labour	National Labour	National Labour	Labour
Leeds North	Coalition Liberal	Conservative	Conservative	Conservative	Conservative	Conservative	Conservative	Conservative
Leeds North East	Co. Conservative	Conservative	Conservative	Conservative	Conservative	Conservative	Conservative	Labour
Leeds South	Coalition Liberal	Labour	Labour	Labour	Labour	Conservative	Labour	Labour
Leeds South East	Labour	Labour	Labour	Labour	Labour	Labour	Labour	Labour
Leeds West	Coalition Liberal	National Liberal	Labour	Labour	Labour	Conservative	Conservative	Labour
Normanton	Labour	Labour	Labour	Labour	Labour	Labour	Labour	Labour
Penistone	Liberal	Liberal	Liberal	Labour	Labour	Conservative	Labour	Labour
Pontefract	Coalition Liberal	Labour	Labour	Conservative	Labour	Conservative	Labour	Labour
Pudsey and Otley	Coalition Liberal	Conservative	Conservative	Conservative	Conservative	Conservative	Conservative	Conservative
Ripon	Co. Conservative	Conservative	Conservative	Conservative	Conservative	Conservative	Conservative	Conservative
Rotherham	Conservative	Conservative	Labour	Labour	Labour	Conservative	Labour	Labour
Rother Valley	Labour	Labour	Labour	Labour	Labour	Labour	Labour	Labour
Rothwell	Labour	Labour	Labour	Labour	Labour	Labour	Labour	Labour
Sheffield Attercliffe	Coalition Liberal	Labour	Labour	Labour	Labour	Conservative	Labour	Labour
Sheffield, Brightside	Coalition Liberal	Labour	Labour	Labour	Labour	Conservative	Labour	Labour
Sheffield, Central	Co. Conservative	Conservative	Conservative	Conservative	Labour	Conservative	Conservative	Labour
Sheffield, Ecclesall	Co. Conservative	Conservative	Conservative	Conservative	Conservative	Conservative	Conservative	Conservative
Sheffield, Hallam	Co. Conservative	Conservative	Conservative	Conservative	Conservative	Conservative	Conservative	Conservative
Sheffield, Hillsborough	Coalition Liberal	Co-operative	Co-operative	Co-operative	Labour Co-op	Conservative	Labour Co-op	Labour Co-op
Sheffield, Park	Coalition Liberal	National Liberal	Conservative	Conservative	Labour	Conservative	Labour	Labour
Shipley	Coalition Liberal	National Liberal	Labour	Labour	Labour	Conservative	Labour	Labour
Skipton	Co. Conservative	Conservative	Conservative	Conservative	Conservative	Conservative	Conservative	Conservative
Sowerby	NADSS	Conservative	Liberal	Conservative	Labour	Conservative	Conservative	Labour
Spen Valley	Coalition Liberal	Liberal	Liberal	Liberal	Liberal	Liberal National	Liberal National	Labour
Wakefield	Co. Conservative	Conservative	Labour	Conservative	Labour	Conservative	Labour	Labour
Wentworth	Labour	Labour	Labour	Labour	Labour	Labour	Labour	Labour

== England non-geographic (7) ==
Constituency	1918	1922	1923	1924	1929	1931	1935	1945
Cambridge University (Two members)	Co. Conservative	Conservative	Conservative	Conservative	Conservative	Conservative	Conservative	Conservative
Cambridge University (Two members)	Co. Conservative	Independent Liberal	Conservative	Conservative	Conservative	Conservative	Conservative	Independent
Combined English Universities (Two members)	Coalition Liberal	National Liberal	Liberal	Liberal	Independent	Independent	Independent	Independent
Combined English Universities (Two members)	Co. Conservative	Conservative	Conservative	Conservative	Conservative	Conservative	Conservative	Independent
Oxford University	Co. Conservative	Conservative	Conservative	Conservative	Conservative	Conservative	Conservative	Independent
Oxford University	Co. Conservative	Conservative	Conservative	Conservative	Conservative	Conservative	Independent	Independent
London University	Co. Conservative	Conservative	Conservative	Independent	Independent	Nat. Independent	Nat. Independent	Independent

== Wales (36) ==
=== Anglesey (1) ===
Constituency	1918	1922	1923	1924	1929	1931	1935	1945
Anglesey	Independent Labour	Independent Labour	Liberal	Liberal	Liberal	Liberal	Liberal	Liberal

=== Caernarvonshire (2) ===
Constituency	1918	1922	1923	1924	1929	1931	1935	1945
Caernarvon District of Boroughs	Coalition Liberal	National Liberal	Liberal	Liberal	Liberal	Liberal	Liberal	Conservative
Carnarvonshire	Coalition Liberal	Labour	Liberal	Liberal	Liberal	Liberal	Liberal	Labour

=== Denbighshire (2) ===
Constituency	1918	1922	1923	1924	1929	1931	1935	1945
Denbigh	Coalition Liberal	National Liberal	Liberal	Liberal	Liberal	Liberal National	Liberal National	Liberal National
Wrexham	Coalition Liberal	Labour	Labour	Liberal	Labour	Liberal	Labour	Labour

=== Flintshire (1) ===
Constituency	1918	1922	1923	1924	1929	1931	1935	1945
Flint	Coalition Liberal	National Liberal	Liberal	Conservative	Liberal	Liberal National	Conservative	Conservative

=== Merionethshire (1) ===
Constituency	1918	1922	1923	1924	1929	1931	1935	1945
Merioneth	Liberal	Liberal	Liberal	Liberal	Liberal	Liberal	Liberal	Liberal

=== Montgomeryshire (1) ===
Constituency	1918	1922	1923	1924	1929	1931	1935	1945
Montgomery	Liberal	Liberal	Liberal	Liberal	Liberal	Liberal National	Liberal National	Liberal

=== Breconshire and Radnorshire (1) ===
Constituency	1918	1922	1923	1924	1929	1931	1935	1945
Brecon and Radnor	Coalition Liberal	National Liberal	Liberal	Conservative	Labour	Conservative	National	Labour

=== Cardiganshire (1) ===
Constituency	1918	1922	1923	1924	1929	1931	1935	1945
Cardigan	Coalition Liberal	National Liberal	Independent Liberal	Liberal	Liberal	Liberal	Liberal	Liberal

=== Carmarthenshire (2) ===
Constituency	1918	1922	1923	1924	1929	1931	1935	1945
Carmarthen	Coalition Liberal	National Liberal	Liberal	Liberal	Labour	Liberal	Labour	Liberal
Llanelly	Coalition Liberal	Labour	Labour	Labour	Labour	Labour	Labour	Labour

=== Pembrokeshire (1) ===
Constituency	1918	1922	1923	1924	1929	1931	1935	1945
Pembrokeshire	Coalition Liberal	National Liberal	Liberal	Conservative	Liberal	Liberal	Liberal	Liberal

=== Glamorgan (16) ===
Constituency	1918	1922	1923	1924	1929	1931	1935	1945
Aberavon	Coalition Liberal	Labour	Labour	Labour	Labour	Labour	Labour	Labour
Aberdare	Coalition NDP	Labour	Labour	Labour	Labour	Labour	Labour	Labour
Llandaff and Barry	Conservative	Conservative	Conservative	Conservative	Labour	Conservative	Conservative	Labour
Caerphilly	Labour	Labour	Labour	Labour	Labour	Labour	Labour	Labour
Cardiff Central	Conservative	Conservative	Conservative	Conservative	Labour	National Labour	National Labour	Labour
Cardiff East	Liberal	Conservative	Liberal	Conservative	Labour	Conservative	Conservative	Labour
Cardiff South	Conservative	Conservative	Labour	Conservative	Labour	Conservative	Conservative	Labour
Gower	Labour	Labour	Labour	Labour	Labour	Labour	Labour	Labour
Merthyr	Coalition Liberal	Labour	Labour	Labour	Labour	Ind. Labour Party	Labour	Labour
Neath	Coalition Liberal	Labour	Labour	Labour	Labour	Labour	Labour	Labour
Ogmore	Labour	Labour	Labour	Labour	Labour	Labour	Labour	Labour
Pontypridd	Coalition Liberal	National Liberal	Labour	Labour	Labour	Labour	Labour	Labour
Rhondda East	Labour	Labour	Labour	Labour	Labour	Labour	Labour	Labour
Rhondda West	Labour	Labour	Labour	Labour	Labour	Labour	Labour	Labour
Swansea East	Coalition Liberal	Labour	Labour	Labour	Labour	Labour	Labour	Labour
Swansea West	Coalition Liberal	National Liberal	Labour	Liberal	Labour	Liberal National	Liberal National	Labour

=== Monmouthshire (6) ===
Constituency	1918	1922	1923	1924	1929	1931	1935	1945
Abertillery	Labour	Labour	Labour	Labour	Labour	Labour	Labour	Labour
Bedwellty	Labour	Labour	Labour	Labour	Labour	Labour	Labour	Labour
Ebbw Vale	Labour	Labour	Labour	Labour	Labour	Labour	Labour	Labour
Monmouth	Conservative	Conservative	Conservative	Conservative	Conservative	Conservative	Conservative	Conservative
Newport	Coalition Liberal	Conservative	Conservative	Conservative	Labour	Conservative	Conservative	Labour
Pontypool	Labour	Labour	Labour	Labour	Labour	Labour	Labour	Labour

=== Non-geographic (1) ===
Constituency	1918	1922	1923	1924	1929	1931	1935	1945
University of Wales	Coalition Liberal	National Liberal	Christian Pacifist	Liberal	Liberal	Liberal	Liberal	Liberal

== Scotland (70) ==
=== Orkney and Shetland (1) ===
Constituency	1918	1922	1923	1924	1929	1931	1935	1945
Orkney and Shetland	Coalition Liberal	Liberal	Liberal	Liberal	Liberal	Liberal	Conservative	Conservative

=== Caithness and Sutherland (1) ===
Constituency	1918	1922	1923	1924	1929	1931	1935	1945
Caithness and Sutherland	Coalition Liberal	National Liberal	Liberal	Liberal	Liberal	Liberal	Liberal	Conservative

=== Inverness-shire and Ross and Cromarty (3) ===
Constituency	1918	1922	1923	1924	1929	1931	1935	1945
Inverness	Coalition Liberal	National Liberal	Liberal	Liberal	Liberal	Liberal National	Liberal National	Ind. Liberal National
Ross and Cromarty	Coalition Liberal	National Liberal	Liberal	Liberal	Liberal	Liberal National	Liberal National	Ind. Liberal National
Western Isles	Liberal	National Liberal	Liberal	Liberal	Liberal	Liberal National	Labour	Labour

=== Banffshire (1) ===
Constituency	1918	1922	1923	1924	1929	1931	1935	1945
Banffshire	Coalition Liberal	National Liberal	Liberal	Conservative	Liberal	Liberal	Conservative	Conservative

=== Moray and Nairnshire (1) ===
Constituency	1918	1922	1923	1924	1929	1931	1935	1945
Moray and Nairn	Coalition Liberal	National Liberal	Conservative	Conservative	Conservative	Conservative	Conservative	Conservative

=== Aberdeenshire and Kincardineshire (5) ===
Constituency	1918	1922	1923	1924	1929	1931	1935	1945
Aberdeen North	Independent Labour	Labour	Labour	Labour	Labour	Conservative	Labour	Labour
Aberdeen South	Co. Conservative	Conservative	Conservative	Conservative	Conservative	Conservative	Conservative	Conservative
Aberdeen and Kincardine Central	Co. Conservative	Liberal	Liberal	Conservative	Conservative	Conservative	Conservative	Conservative
Aberdeen and Kincardine East	Coalition Liberal	Liberal	Liberal	Conservative	Conservative	Conservative	Conservative	Conservative
Aberdeenshire West and Kincardine	Coalition Liberal	Liberal	Conservative	Conservative	Liberal	Conservative	Conservative	Conservative

=== Forfarshire (4) ===
Constituency	1918	1922	1923	1924	1929	1931	1935	1945
Dundee (Two members)	Labour	Labour	Labour	Labour	Labour	Liberal	Liberal	Labour
Dundee (Two members)	Coalition Liberal	Scottish Prohibition	Scottish Prohibition	Scottish Prohibition	Scottish Prohibition	Conservative	Conservative	Labour
Forfarshire	Conservative	Liberal	Liberal	Conservative	Conservative	Conservative	Conservative	Conservative
Montrose Burghs	Coalition Liberal	National Liberal	Liberal	Liberal	Liberal	Liberal National	Liberal National	Liberal National

=== Argyllshire (1) ===
Constituency	1918	1922	1923	1924	1929	1931	1935	1945
Argyllshire	Coalition Liberal	National Liberal	Liberal	Conservative	Conservative	Conservative	Conservative	Conservative

=== Perthshire and Kinross-shire (2) ===
Constituency	1918	1922	1923	1924	1929	1931	1935	1945
Kinross and Western Perthshire	Liberal	National Liberal	Conservative	Conservative	Conservative	Conservative	Conservative	Conservative
Perth	Coalition Liberal	Conservative	Liberal	Conservative	Conservative	Conservative	Conservative	Conservative

=== Stirlingshire and Clackmannanshire (3) ===
Constituency	1918	1922	1923	1924	1929	1931	1935	1945
Stirling and Falkirk	Liberal	Labour	Liberal	Labour	Labour	Conservative	Labour	Labour
Clackmannan and Eastern Stirlingshire	Co. Conservative	Labour	Labour	Labour	Labour	Conservative	Labour	Labour
Stirlingshire West	Co. Conservative	Labour	Labour	Conservative	Labour	Conservative	Labour	Labour

=== Fife (4) ===
Constituency	1918	1922	1923	1924	1929	1931	1935	1945
Dunfermline Burghs	Coalition Liberal	Labour	Labour	Labour	Labour	Liberal National	Labour	Labour
Fife East	Conservative	Liberal	Liberal	Conservative	Liberal	Liberal National	Liberal National	Liberal National
Fife West	Labour	Labour	Labour	Labour	Labour	Conservative	Communist	Communist
Kirkcaldy Burghs	Coalition Liberal	National Liberal	Labour	Labour	Labour	Conservative	Labour	Labour

=== Dunbartonshire (2) ===
Constituency	1918	1922	1923	1924	1929	1931	1935	1945
Dumbarton Burghs	Coalition Liberal	Labour	Labour	Labour	Labour	Labour	Labour	Labour
Dunbartonshire	Co. Conservative	Conservative	Labour	Conservative	Labour	Conservative	Conservative	Labour

=== Renfrewshire (4) ===
Constituency	1918	1922	1923	1924	1929	1931	1935	1945
Greenock	Liberal	Liberal	Liberal	Liberal	Liberal	Liberal National	Liberal National	Labour
Paisley	Liberal	Liberal	Liberal	Labour	Labour	Liberal	Liberal	Labour
Renfrewshire East	Coalition Liberal	Labour	Labour	Conservative	Conservative	Conservative	Conservative	Conservative
Renfrewshire West	Coalition Liberal	Labour	Labour	Conservative	Labour	Conservative	Conservative	Labour

=== Ayrshire and Bute (4) ===
Constituency	1918	1922	1923	1924	1929	1931	1935	1945
Ayr Burghs	Co. Conservative	Conservative	Conservative	Conservative	Conservative	Conservative	Conservative	Conservative
Ayrshire North and Bute	Co. Conservative	Conservative	Conservative	Conservative	Conservative	Conservative	Conservative	Conservative
Ayrshire South	Labour	Labour	Labour	Labour	Labour	Conservative	Labour	Labour
Kilmarnock	Coalition Liberal	National Liberal	Labour	Conservative	Labour	National Labour	National Labour	Labour

=== Lanarkshire (22) ===
Constituency	1918	1922	1923	1924	1929	1931	1935	1945
Bothwell	Co. Conservative	Labour	Labour	Labour	Labour	Conservative	Labour	Labour
Coatbridge	Co. Conservative	Labour	Labour	Labour	Labour	Conservative	Labour	Labour
Glasgow Bridgeton	Coalition Liberal	Labour	Labour	Labour	Labour	Ind. Labour Party	Ind. Labour Party	Ind. Labour Party
Glasgow Camlachie	Co. Conservative	Labour	Labour	Labour	Labour	Conservative	Ind. Labour Party	Ind. Labour Party
Glasgow Cathcart	Coalition Liberal	Labour	Conservative	Conservative	Conservative	Conservative	Conservative	Conservative
Glasgow Central	Co. Conservative	Conservative	Conservative	Conservative	Conservative	Conservative	Conservative	Conservative
Glasgow Gorbals	Coalition Labour	Labour	Labour	Labour	Labour	Ind. Labour Party	Ind. Labour Party	Labour
Glasgow Govan	Labour	Labour	Labour	Labour	Independent Labour	Labour	Labour	Labour
Glasgow Hillhead	Co. Conservative	Conservative	Conservative	Conservative	Conservative	Conservative	Conservative	Conservative
Glasgow Kelvingrove	Co. Conservative	Conservative	Conservative	Conservative	Conservative	Conservative	Conservative	Labour
Glasgow Maryhill	Co. Conservative	Labour	Labour	Conservative	Labour	Conservative	Labour	Labour
Glasgow Partick	Coalition Liberal	National Liberal	Co-operative	Conservative	Labour	Conservative	Conservative	Conservative
Glasgow Pollok	Co. Conservative	Conservative	Conservative	Conservative	Conservative	Conservative	Conservative	Conservative
Glasgow St. Rollox	Co. Conservative	Labour	Labour	Labour	Labour	Labour Co-op	Labour Co-op	Labour Co-op
Glasgow Shettleston	Co. Conservative	Labour	Labour	Labour	Labour	Ind. Labour Party	Ind. Labour Party	Ind. Labour Party
Glasgow Springburn	Co. Conservative	Labour	Labour	Labour	Labour	Conservative	Labour	Labour Co-op
Glasgow Tradeston	Co. Conservative	Co-operative	Co-operative	Co-operative	Labour Co-op	Conservative	Labour Co-op	Labour Co-op
Hamilton	Labour	Labour	Labour	Labour	Labour	Labour	Labour	Labour
Lanark	Co. Conservative	Conservative	Labour	Conservative	Labour	Conservative	Conservative	Labour
Lanarkshire North	Co. Conservative	Labour	Labour	Conservative	Labour	Conservative	Conservative	Labour
Motherwell	Co. Conservative	Communist	Conservative	Labour	Labour	Conservative	Labour	Labour
Rutherglen	Coalition Liberal	Labour	Labour	Labour	Labour	Conservative	Conservative	Labour

=== Linlithgowshire (1) ===
Constituency	1918	1922	1923	1924	1929	1931	1935	1945
Linlithgow	Co. Conservative	Labour	Labour	Conservative	Labour	Conservative	Labour	Labour

=== Midlothian and Peeblesshire (8) ===
Constituency	1918	1922	1923	1924	1929	1931	1935	1945
Edinburgh Central	Labour	Labour	Labour	Labour	Labour	Conservative	Conservative	Labour
Edinburgh East	Liberal	Liberal	Liberal	Labour	Labour	Liberal	Labour	Labour
Edinburgh North	Co. Conservative	Conservative	Liberal	Conservative	Conservative	Conservative	Conservative	Labour
Edinburgh South	Co. Conservative	Conservative	Conservative	Conservative	Conservative	Conservative	Conservative	Conservative
Edinburgh West	Co. Conservative	Liberal	Liberal	Conservative	Labour	Conservative	Conservative	Conservative
Leith	Liberal	Liberal	Liberal	Liberal	Liberal	Liberal National	Liberal National	Labour
Midlothian North	Co. Conservative	Conservative	Labour	Conservative	Conservative	Conservative	Conservative	Conservative
Midlothian South and Peebles	Liberal	Labour	Labour	Labour	Labour	Conservative	Conservative	Labour

=== Dumfriesshire (1) ===
Constituency	1918	1922	1923	1924	1929	1931	1935	1945
Dumfriesshire	Co. Conservative	Liberal	Liberal	Conservative	Liberal	Liberal	Liberal National	Liberal National

=== Kirkcudbrightshire and Wigtownshire (1) ===
Constituency	1918	1922	1923	1924	1929	1931	1935	1945
Galloway	Coalition Liberal	Liberal	Liberal	Conservative	Liberal	Conservative	Conservative	Ind. Conservative

=== Roxburghshire and Selkirkshire (1) ===
Constituency	1918	1922	1923	1924	1929	1931	1935	1945
Roxburgh and Selkirk	Coalition Liberal	National Liberal	Conservative	Conservative	Conservative	Conservative	Conservative	Conservative

=== Berwickshire and Haddingtonshire (1) ===
Constituency	1918	1922	1923	1924	1929	1931	1935	1945
Berwick and Haddington	Coalition Liberal	National Liberal	Labour	Conservative	Labour	Conservative	Conservative	Labour

=== Non-geographic (3) ===
Constituency	1918	1922	1923	1924	1929	1931	1935	1945
Combined Scottish Universities (Three members)	Conservative	Conservative	Conservative	Conservative	Conservative	Conservative	Conservative	National
Combined Scottish Universities (Three members)	Liberal	Liberal	Liberal	Liberal	Liberal	Liberal	Liberal National	Independent
Combined Scottish Universities (Three members)	Conservative	Conservative	Conservative	Conservative	Conservative	Conservative	Conservative	Conservative

== Northern Ireland (13 - from 1922) ==
Constituency	1922	1923	1924	1929	1931	1935	1945
Antrim (Two members)	Ulster Unionist	Ulster Unionist	Ulster Unionist	Ulster Unionist	Ulster Unionist	Ulster Unionist	Ulster Unionist
Antrim (Two members)	Ulster Unionist	Ulster Unionist	Ulster Unionist	Ulster Unionist	Ulster Unionist	Ulster Unionist	Ulster Unionist
Armagh	Ulster Unionist	Ulster Unionist	Ulster Unionist	Ulster Unionist	Ulster Unionist	Ulster Unionist	Ulster Unionist
Belfast East	Ulster Unionist	Ulster Unionist	Ulster Unionist	Ulster Unionist	Ulster Unionist	Ulster Unionist	Ulster Unionist
Belfast North	Ulster Unionist	Ulster Unionist	Ulster Unionist	Ulster Unionist	Ulster Unionist	Ulster Unionist	Ulster Unionist
Belfast South	Ulster Unionist	Ulster Unionist	Ulster Unionist	Ulster Unionist	Ulster Unionist	Ulster Unionist	Ulster Unionist
Belfast West	Ulster Unionist	Ulster Unionist	Ulster Unionist	Ulster Unionist	Ulster Unionist	Ulster Unionist	Independent Labour
Down (Two members)	Ulster Unionist	Ulster Unionist	Ulster Unionist	Ulster Unionist	Ulster Unionist	Ulster Unionist	Independent Unionist
Down (Two members)	Ulster Unionist	Ulster Unionist	Ulster Unionist	Ulster Unionist	Ulster Unionist	Ulster Unionist	Ulster Unionist
Fermanagh and Tyrone (Two members)	Nationalist	Nationalist	Ulster Unionist	Nationalist	Nationalist	Nationalist	Nationalist
Fermanagh and Tyrone (Two members)	Nationalist	Nationalist	Ulster Unionist	Nationalist	Nationalist	Nationalist	Nationalist
Londonderry	Ulster Unionist	Ulster Unionist	Ulster Unionist	Ulster Unionist	Ulster Unionist	Ulster Unionist	Ulster Unionist
Queen's University of Belfast	Ulster Unionist	Ulster Unionist	Ulster Unionist	Ulster Unionist	Ulster Unionist	Ulster Unionist	Ulster Unionist
