= Wesley Perrins =

British trade unionist & politician (1905-1990)

Wesley Perrins, MBE (21 September 1905 – 12 January 1990) was an English trade unionist and Labour Party politician from Stourbridge. He had a long career in local government in Worcestershire, and sat in the House of Commons from 1945 to 1950.

== Early life ==
Perrins was the son of Councillor Amos Perrins of Stourbridge. He was educated at Wollescote Council School and at the Upper Standard School in Lye. A socialist, and a trade union official from 1935, Perrins was a member of Lye and Wollescote Urban District Council from 1928 to 1933, and of Stourbridge Urban District Council from 1933 to 1936.

== Career ==
He was elected at the 1945 general election as the member of parliament (MP) for Birmingham Yardley, defeating the sitting Conservative MP Sir Edward Salt. Perrins served only five years in Westminster, and retired from the Parliament at the 1950 general election.

He was awarded the MBE in the New Year Honours List 1952 for his work as Birmingham and District secretary of the General and Municipal Workers Union, later became a member of the West Midlands Economic Planning Council. He was a members of Worcestershire County Council from 1955 to 1974 and of the National Executive Committee of the Labour Party from 1965 to 1965.

== Family ==
In July 1932, Perrins married Mary Evans, the daughter of Charles Evans. They had 2 children Inga (8 March 1935) and Bryn (18 January 1944) who both pursued successful careers in higher education.

Parliament of the United Kingdom
Preceded by Sir Edward Salt	Member of Parliament for Birmingham Yardley; 1945 – 1950	Succeeded by Henry Usborne
