= Syd Tierney =

British trade unionist & politician (1923-2010)

Sydney Tierney (16 September 1923 – 6 March 2010) was a British Labour Party politician and former President of the Union of Shop, Distributive and Allied Workers (USDAW).

== Union career ==
Tierney joined one of the forerunners of USDAW in 1938 whilst working as a milkman in Rotherham. In 1953 he was appointed a collector/canvasser based in Sheffield, 4 years later becoming an area organiser for the Midlands division, based in Leicester.

In 1977 he was elected USDAW President and after losing his parliamentary seat returned to work as a national officer for USDAW with responsibilities for SATA membership and the insurance section.

== Labour Party ==
Tierney was Member of Parliament for the marginal Birmingham Yardley seat from February 1974 until his defeat at 1979 general election by the Conservative David Gilroy Bevan.

He also served as a councillor and Labour NEC member and chaired the party for a year.

Parliament of the United Kingdom
Preceded by Derek Coombs	Member of Parliament for Birmingham Yardley; February 1974 – 1979	Succeeded by David Gilroy Bevan
Political offices
Preceded by James Hughes	President of USDAW; 1977–1991	Succeeded by Audrey Wise
