= Alfred Jephcott =

British politician

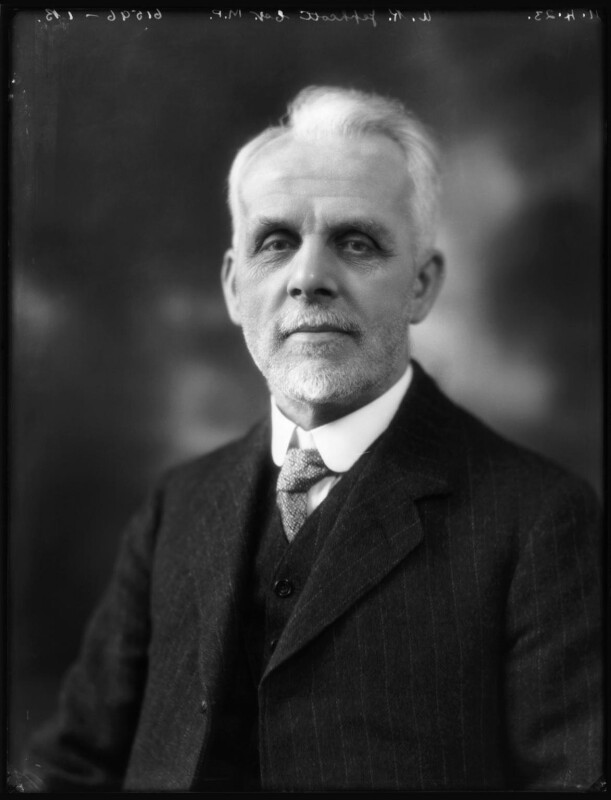
Jephcott in 1923

Alfred Roger Jephcott JP (14 February 1853 – 14 March 1932) was a British engineer, trade unionist and Conservative Party politician from Birmingham. He sat in the House of Commons from 1918 to 1929.

== Early life and family ==
Jephcott was born in Coventry to working-class parents; his father was Thomas Jephcott. Having moved to Birmingham at an early age, he was educated at St Paul's School in Balsall Heath.

In 1884 he married Lucy White, daughter of William White of Birmingham.

== Career ==
After leaving school, Jephcott took up an apprenticeship as an engineering mechanic. He joined the Amalgamated Society of Engineers and was twice president of the Birmingham Trades Council.

He served for a time of the school board and 1895 was elected to Birmingham City Council, of which he was the second-oldest member. He later became an alderman and was appointed in 1904 as a Justice of the Peace (JP) in 1904.

=== Parliament ===
He unsuccessfully contested Paisley at the December 1910 general election.

By 1918 he was regarded as a leader of working-class conservatives in Birmingham, and was selected as the Unionist candidate for the Yardley division of Birmingham. Four candidates were expected to contest the seat, all City Council members, of whom two were aldermen, but only three candidates actually stood. At the election in December 1918 Jephcott, who stood as a coalition Unionist (i.e. a supporter of the coalition government led the Liberal David Lloyd George) won the seat with 56% of the votes, a majority of 18% over the Labour Party candidate alderman George Shann, who died only three weeks after polling day.

Jephcott was returned at a further three general elections, on each occasion facing only a Labour Party opponent. Before the 1923 election, The Times newspaper reported that Jephcott "should have no difficulty in retaining the seat", but his majority was cut to 7%, down from 16% in 1922. At the 1924 election, The Times initially reported local doubts about Jephcott's ability to hold the seat, but later expressed confidence in his chances, and he held the seat with a majority only slightly reduced to 6.4%.

He was not a frequent participant in debates in the Commons. In May 1927, during a debate on the Trade Disputes and Trade Unions Bill, Jephcott stated that the difficulties faced by trade unions arose from the fact that they "gave up industrial action and took to political action". He said that he was ready to loyally support the Labour party in Parliament on industrial issues, but because he differed from the party on the disestablishment of the Church of England and on other matters he had not been allowed to be a Labour Party candidate.

In November of the following year, Jephcott seconded the motion on the King's Speech to Parliament. He was described at the time as "a strong constitionalist" who had been a member of the Amalgamated Society of Engineers for over 40 years.

== Retirement ==
In July 1927 he announced his decision to retire when Parliament was dissolved, stating that at the age of 75 he felt it was time to make way for a younger man. In November 1928 he was knocked down by a motorcycle while crossing the High Street in Birmingham, and suffered a broken ankle.

He did not contest the 1929 general election, when the seat was won by the Labour candidate Archibald Gossling.

Jephcott died in Birmingham on 14 March 1932, aged 79.

Trade union offices
Preceded by John Valentine Stevens	President of the Birmingham Trades Council; 1889–91	Succeeded by Charles Castell Cooke
Parliament of the United Kingdom
New constituency	Member of Parliament for Birmingham Yardley; 1918–29	Succeeded by Archibald Gossling
