= One World Trust =

Global trust

One World Trust Logo

The One World Trust is a charitable organization that promotes education and research into changes required in global governance to achieve the eradication of poverty, injustice, environmental degradation and war. It develops recommendations on practical ways to make powerful organisations more accountable to the people they affect now and in the future, and how the rule of law can be applied to all.

Established in 1951 in support of the All-Party Group for World Government, the Trust continues to have a close relationship with the UK Parliament. The Trust is an NGO with Special consultative Status with the United Nations Economic and Social Council.

== History ==
The One World Trust was founded in 1951 by the All-Party Group for World Governance, a group in the British Parliament founded by Henry Usborne in 1947.

== Governance ==
The Trust’s work is overseen by a board of trustees. There are currently ten trustees with Lord Archer of Sandwell, PC as President, and Tony Colman leading as Chair. The Trust is also supported by a group of Vice-Presidents acting as Patrons, and members of different project related advisory panels.

== Funding ==
The Trust’s work is funded by donations, bequests from individual supporters and through grants. Funders include the Ford Foundation, the Joseph Rowntree Charitable Trust, the James Madison Trust, the Konrad Adenauer Foundation, the Bearing Foundation, the Polden Puckham Charitable Foundation, the Funding Network and the Allan and Nesta Ferguson Charitable Settlement. The Trust also derives a limited level of income from consultancy work.

== Transparency ==
As part of its commitment to accountability, the Trust has developed an Information Disclosure Policy to provide stakeholders with an opportunity to identify what information they can access, including trustee meeting minutes, strategic plans and financial accounts, which are all posted online.

== Sphere of activity ==
The One World Trust works to make global governance more accountable. In its research, it focuses on the accountability of global organisations, the political engagement of citizens at global level, and international law. Key project areas include the annual Global Accountability Report, Parliamentary Oversight of Foreign Policy, and work on the Responsibility to Protect.

== Accountability of global institutions ==
The Trust conducts research and advocacy to improve the accountability of global organisations. Through its Global Accountability Framework, the Trust promotes conceptual understanding, cross sectoral learning, and organisational change in powerful globally operating institutions from the intergovernmental, non-governmental and transnational corporate sectors.

The Framework breaks up the concept of accountability into four dimensions: transparency, participation, evaluation, and complaint and response mechanisms. Using indicators developed for these dimensions, the Trust seeks to capture organisational capacity to be accountable based on the principles and values that underlie an organisation’s policies and systems.

Based on the framework, the One World Trust produces its annual Global Accountability Report. Alongside these reports, the Trust also works with Parliamentarians, national and international NGO umbrella groups and transnational corporations to strengthen their individual capacity to be accountable to their stakeholders as part of an integrated global governance system.

== Parliamentary oversight of foreign policy ==
The Trust’s Parliamentary Oversight Project, running since 2003, examines how the British Parliament holds the British government to account for foreign policy development and decisions. The project specifically focuses on the systems and practices in place for UK approaches to international organisations like the World Bank, the International Monetary Fund, the World Trade Organisation, the European Union or key countries such as the United States. This includes the way Britain responds armed conflict. The project conducts research on loopholes in Parliamentary controls and undertakes advocacy to implement reforms.

In collaboration with Democratic Audit and the Federal Trust for Education and Research, the One World Trust published in 2006 the book Not in Our Name: Democracy and Foreign Policy in the UK, which looked at the checks and balances between Parliament and the UK government in the formulation and oversight of foreign policy. In December 2007, the One World Trust published the most recent of the three organisations' joint report A World of Difference: Parliamentary Oversight of British Foreign Policy, which focuses on the practical experiences and problems with parliamentary oversight of global security, responses to conflict and scrutiny of UK policy towards the European Union.

== Responsibility to protect ==
The Trust's work on international law currently focuses on the opportunities and challenges associated with the increasing development of the international doctrine of the Responsibility to Protect (R2P). Undertaking its own research and advocacy the Trust works in particular to encourage international political agreement on R2P as a global framework for conflict prevention, response, and rebuilding of affected societies. With this focus, the Trust builds on its work in support of the development and ratification of the International Criminal Court (ICC) aimed at strengthening access to justice and redress for survivors of grave human rights abuses including war crimes, crimes against humanity and genocide. Through its Global Responsibility lectures and briefing papers, the One World Trust provides parliamentarians and others in the policy community with the opportunity to access key viewpoints and research results on issues associated with the operationalisation of the Responsibility to Protect and enforcement of the international rule of law.
