= Leonard Cleaver =

British politician

Leonard Harry Cleaver (27 October 1909 – 7 July 1993) was a British Conservative politician. He was elected as Member of Parliament (MP) for the Birmingham Yardley constituency at the 1959 general election, winning the marginal seat from Labour. Cleaver served until the 1964 general election, when the seat was won by Labour candidate Ioan Evans.

Parliament of the United Kingdom
Preceded by Henry Usborne	Member of Parliament for Birmingham Yardley; 1959–1964	Succeeded by Ioan Evans
