= Derek Coombs =

British politician (1931–2014)

- Born: 12 August 1931
- Died: 30 December 2014 (aged 83)
- Occupations: Politician, businessman, publisher
- Spouse: Jennifer Lonsdale

Derek Michael Coombs (12 August 1931 – 30 December 2014) was a British Conservative politician. He was Member of Parliament for Birmingham Yardley from 1970 to 1974, winning a marginal seat which was later recovered by Labour's Sydney Tierney. Whilst an MP, he supported the UK's joining of the then EEC. Additionally, he introduced a private members bill which relaxed the earnings rule for pensioners, and assisted the peace process in Northern Ireland which led to the Sunningdale Agreement. Derek Coombs was also briefly an officer in the Royal Artillery, a successful businessman, a supporter of the arts, and the founding chairman of Prospect magazine.

== Family ==
Derek Coombs was married first in early 1959 in Sutton Coldfield to Patricia (b. Leeds North, late-1930) the elder sister of Peter O'Toole; Coombs and Patricia had two children, a daughter Sian (b. early-1967) and a son Fiann (b. late-1968.) His second marriage, which lasted to the end of his life, was in 1986 to Jennifer (née Lonsdale); they had two sons, Jack and Adam. Jennifer Coombs later became High Sheriff of Dorset, and is an active Deputy Lieutenant and philanthropist in the county.

In 2010, his younger son Adam, having just left Bryanston School, died after ingesting opium while on his gap year, before he was due to begin a philosophy degree course at Manchester University.

Jack now works in the family business as Director of S & U Plc.

Derek Coombs was an energetic man who enjoyed travel, the arts and sailing. He was also a firm supporter of Birmingham City Football club, which was owned and chaired by his father Clifford, and later his brother Keith. Derek suffered from dementia in later life and died aged 83. He lived at Stepleton House, near Iwerne Courtney (Shroton) in Dorset, and in Chelsea, London. A well-attended memorial service was held in Blandford Forum Parish Church on Saturday, 31 January 2015, followed by a function in the Blandford Forum Corn Exchange.

== Prospect magazine ==
Derek Coombs was concerned over what he called the “dumbing down” of the British press and aimed to create an intellectual magazine to counter the trend and provide a space for the sciences and thought pieces from across the political spectrum. Derek initially sought to buy the New Statesman, but when that did not succeed Derek teamed up with former Financial Times journalist David Goodhart, and together founded Prospect, the intellectual monthly magazine in 1995. Coombs invested several hundred thousand into the venture and it became a leading magazine in Westminster. He had a regular column "Chairman's Corner" until 2005. In 2008 when Derek became ill, George Robinson, a director of London-based hedge fund Sloane Robinson Investment Management, and Peter Hall, of boutique fund manager Hunter Hall, each acquired 26% of the title after Coombs’ attorneys, acting for the magazine's chairman and largest shareholder, sold his 40% stake.

== Business career ==
In 1949-51 Derek served 2 years of National Service in the Royal Artillery as a Lieutenant in the British Army of the Rhine, much of which he spent demolishing former Nazi buildings. During this time Derek also continued the family tradition of boxing and was battalion champion. In 1959 Derek briefly visited Havana with the American broadcaster Ed Sullivan and was present at the first interview of Fidel Castro following the Cuban Revolution.

During the 1950s and 1960s Coombs worked as a film producer in the US. During this time Coombs acquired the film rights for the first four James Bond novels, selling them on after Peter O’Toole refused the lead.

The Coombs family founded and own the listed specialist finance company S & U plc, which provides bridging and motor finance. Derek Coombs was Chairman of S & U Plc for several decades during which he and his brother and Co-chairman Keith Coombs transformed a struggling department store into a successful finance company. Derek also founded S & U Plc's successful subsidiary Advantage in 1999, then run by the energetic CEO Guy Thompson. S&U operates today under the Aspen Bridging and Advantage Finance brands.

Derek was a serial entrepreneur and developer and, amongst other ventures, built several shopping centres under the company Hardanger alongside Nicholas Sciviter.

The Coombs family held stakes in Metalrax, a previous engineering venture

Parliament of the United Kingdom
Preceded by Ioan Evans	Member of Parliament for Birmingham Yardley; 1970 – February 1974	Succeeded by Syd Tierney
