= Edward Salt =

British politician

Sir Edward William Salt (18 May 1881 – 8 September 1970) was a Conservative member of parliament (MP) for the Birmingham Yardley constituency from 1931 to 1945. He was the son of Ashton Trow Salt, a surgical instrument maker in Aston, and his wife Emily. He was educated at Camp Hill Grammar School in Birmingham. In 1910, he married Alice Elizabeth, daughter of John Joseph Pratt Edmunds of Hawkesley Hall, King's Norton, and had a son and three daughters.

In the First World War, he served with the Worcestershire Yeomanry from 1916 to 1919. From 1923 to 1925, he was chairman of the British Limb Association.

In 1929, he was defeated as Conservative candidate for the Birmingham Yardley constituency in that year's general election, but he won the seat two years later. He retained the seat until he was defeated in the 1945 general election. From 1943 to 1945, he was chairman of the Parliamentary and Scientific Committee. He was knighted in 1945.

He was appointed Sheriff of Warwickshire for 1952–53.

He was also managing director of Salt and Son Limited of Cherry Street, Birmingham.

Parliament of the United Kingdom
| Preceded by Archibald George Gossling | Member of Parliament for Birmingham Yardley; 1931–1945 | Succeeded by Wesley Perrins |
Honorary titles
| Preceded by Walford Hollier Turner | High Sheriff of Warwickshire; 1952–1953 | Succeeded by Lt.-Col. G. T. S. Horton, MC |
