= Archibald Gossling =

British trade unionist & politician (1878-1950)

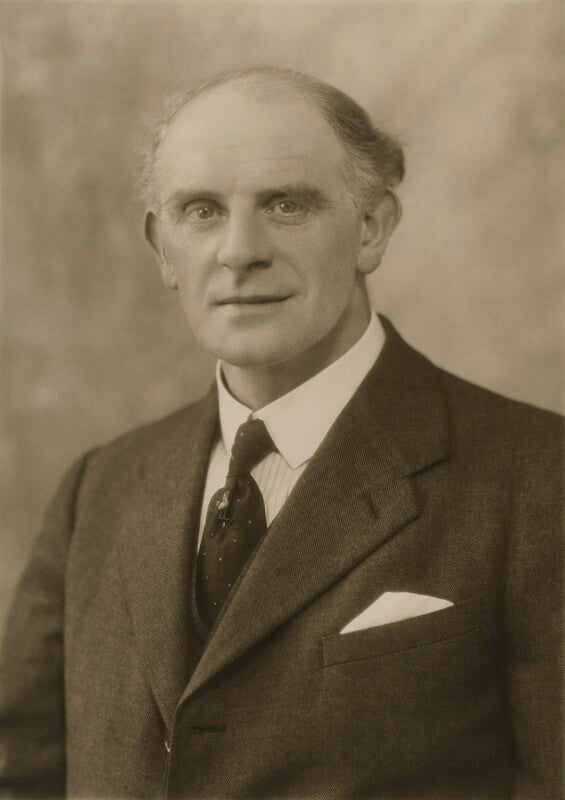
Gossling in 1929

Archibald George Gossling (1878 – 19 May 1950) was a British trade unionist and Labour politician.

Gossling was a joiner by trade, and became a member of the executive of the National Federation of Building Trades Operatives and the Amalgamated Society of Woodworkers. In 1924 he was chosen to contest the parliamentary constituency of Birmingham Yardley for the Labour Party. He failed to unseat the sitting Coalition Conservative MP, Alfred Jephcott, who retained the seat with a majority of nearly 2,000 votes.

At the next general election, five years later, Gossling was again chosen as Labour candidate. This time he faced two opponents, Edward Salt of the Conservatives and C A Beaumont of the Liberal Party. Gossling benefited from a large rise in support for Labour and the presence of the third candidate. He was elected to the Commons with a majority of 4,366 votes over Salt, while Beaumont secured 5,500 votes.

Two years later another election was held. This followed the collapse of the Labour administration and the formation of a National Government, and Labour's vote dropped sharply. Gossling's Conservative opponent was again Edward Salt, the only other candidate being E J Bartlett of the New Party. Gossling was heavily defeated, with Salt winning the seat for the government by a majority of more than 15,000 votes.

Parliament of the United Kingdom
Preceded by Alfred Jephcott	Member of Parliament for Birmingham Yardley; 1929–1931	Succeeded by Edward Salt
