= Ioan Evans (politician) =

British politician (1927–1984)

Comptroller of the Household
- In office 1968–1970
- Prime Minister: Harold Wilson
- Preceded by: William Howie
- Succeeded by: Walter Elliot

Member of Parliament for Cynon Valley Aberdare (1974–1983)
- In office 28 February 1974 – 10 February 1984
- Preceded by: Arthur Probert
- Succeeded by: Ann Clwyd

Member of Parliament for Birmingham Yardley
- In office 15 October 1964 – 29 May 1970
- Preceded by: Leonard Cleaver
- Succeeded by: Derek Coombs

Personal details
- Born: Ioan Lyonel Evans; 10 July 1927 Llanelli, Wales
- Died: 10 February 1984 (aged 56) Hillingdon, London, England
- Party: Labour

Ioan Lyonel Evans (10 July 1927 – 10 February 1984) was a Welsh politician. He served as a Labour and Co-operative Member of Parliament (MP) from 1964 to 1970 and from 1974 until his death.

== Early life ==
Ioan Evans was born in Llanelli, the son of Evan Evans, a builder and clerk of works and his wife. He was educated at Llanelli Grammar School and the University College of Wales, Swansea. He served on the West Bromwich education committee and acted as the Labour agent for the general elections in 1955 and 1959 in the Birmingham Small Heath constituency. He was secretary of Birmingham and District Co-operative Party.

== MP for Birmingham Yardley ==
Evans was first elected to Parliament in the 1964 general election for the constituency of Birmingham Yardley. From 2 May 1966 to 26 September 1966, Evans was a substitute member of the Parliamentary Assembly of the Council of Europe. From 1968 to 1970 he was Comptroller of the Household in the Wilson Government. Evans lost his seat in the 1970 general election to Conservative Derek Coombs.

== Later parliamentary career ==
Following his electoral defeat, Evans became Director of the International Defence and Aid Fund. He re-entered Parliament in the February 1974 general election for the Welsh seat of Aberdare.

He was appointed PPS to the Secrtetary of State for Wales, John Morris, but resigned in late 1974 due to his opposition to the party's policy on Welsh devolution. Evans feared that devolution would lead to the centralization of local government authority in Cardiff, as well as the appointment of an additional 1300 civil servants. His chief objection, however, was to the additional costs of devolution, which Evans believed would be several million pounds per year. Eventually, Evans was one of six Labour MPs to oppose devolution in the referendum of 1979, when the government proposals were heavily defeated.

From 1977 until 1982 he was secretary to the Welsh group of Labour MPs and active on an array of Labour backbench committees. In 1982 he was appointed as an opposition spokesman on Europe, serving under Eric Heffer. The following year he was appointed as a junior spokesman on Welsh Affairs.

The Aberdare constituency was abolished in 1983, but Evans was elected for the new Cynon Valley constituency which had very similar boundaries to the previous seat. He died the following year, aged 56, in Hillingdon, and Ann Clwyd was elected as his successor at the subsequent by-election.

== Personal life ==
In 1949, Evans married Maria Griffiths, and they had one son and one daughter.

Following his untimely death on 10 February 1984, Evans's funeral service was held at St Elvan's Church, Aberdare.

== Sources ==
=== Online ===
- Jones, John Graham. "Ioan Lyonel Evans". Dictionary of Welsh Biography. National Library of Wales.

Parliament of the United Kingdom
Preceded by Leonard Cleaver	Member of Parliament for Birmingham Yardley; 1964–1970	Succeeded by Derek Coombs
Preceded by Arthur Probert	Member of Parliament for Aberdare; Feb 1974 – 1983	Constituency abolished
New constituency	Member of Parliament for Cynon Valley; 1983–1984	Succeeded by Ann Clwyd
Political offices
Preceded by William Howie	Comptroller of the Household; 1968–1970	Succeeded by Walter Elliot
