= Jennifer Lonsdale =

British actress

- Born: Jennifer Sheila Lonsdale; 17 July 1953 (age 72); Gosport, Hampshire, England
- Occupations: Actress, public official
- Years active: 1973–1986 (acting)
- Spouse: Derek Coombs (m. 1986; died 2014)

Jennifer Lonsdale (born 17 July 1953 in Gosport, Hampshire) is a retired British television actress and public official. She appeared as a series regular in The Cedar Tree and That's My Boy. Lonsdale played a customer in one episode of the series Are You Being Served?. She also featured in the Doctor Who serial Nightmare of Eden.

In 2015, she became High Sheriff of Dorset. In 2016, she was awarded an honorary Doctor of Arts by Bournemouth University and became a Pro-chancellor of the University in 2017. As of 2023, she is a Deputy Lieutenant of Dorset.

== Personal life ==
She was married to Conservative politician and businessman Derek Coombs (1931-2014) with whom she had two sons.
