= Henry Usborne =

British politician (1909–1996)

Member of Parliament for Birmingham Yardley Birmingham Acock's Green (1945–1950)
- In office 26 July 1945 – 8 October 1959
- Preceded by: New constituency
- Succeeded by: Leonard Cleaver

Personal details
- Born: Henry Charles Usborne; 16 January 1909 Hisar, Punjab, India
- Died: 16 March 1996 (aged 87) Evesham, Worcestershire, London, UK
- Party: Liberal (1962–1988)
- Other political affiliations: Labour (Before 1962)
- Education: Bradfield College
- Alma mater: Corpus Christi College, Cambridge

Henry Charles Usborne (16 January 1909 – 16 March 1996) was a British Labour Party politician and peace activist who defected to the Liberal Party.

== Early life and career ==
Usborne was born in Hisar, Punjab, India, was educated at Bradfield College and read engineering at Corpus Christi College, Cambridge.

== Political career ==
In the 1945 general election, Usborne was elected as the member of parliament (MP) for Acocks Green. The constituency was abolished and in 1950 Usborne was elected in the marginal constituency of Birmingham Yardley. He held the seat until the 1959 general election.

According to his obituary in the Times on 19 March 1996, Usborne resigned from the Labour Party in 1962 and joined the Liberal Party. He urged former colleagues to join Jo Grimond's party as the best hope for defeating the Conservatives. There was a suggestion that Usborne be nominated to stand for the Liberal Party at Cheltenham, but he announced that wild horses would not drag him into another parliamentary contest.

=== Foundation of Parliamentary Group for World Government ===
In addition to his work as a constituency MP, he was one of the main drivers in the British world federalist movement. In 1945, ahead of the foundation of the United Nations, Edith Wynner, a friend, activist and secretary to Rosika Schwimmer visited London and worked with Henry for Campaign for World Government. After that Henry founded the Parliamentary Group for World Government (PGWG) in 1945, which led to the establishment of the World Association of Parliamentarians for World Government (WAPWG) in 1947, later renamed as the World Parliament Association (WPA). Which as All Party Parliamentary Group for World Governance (APPGWG) counts today. 167 members of APPGWG meets regularly to provide a forum for debate on global governance issues in the British Parliament. In 1951, Usborne set up the One World Trust (OWT) as an independent educational Charity to provide secretarial support to the Group, promote and disseminate knowledge on world governance. In addition to its ongoing support for the APPGWG, the One World Trust conducts independent research into the accountability of global organisations, political engagement of citizens at global level and international law.

Usborne was one of the signatories of the agreement to convene a convention for drafting a world constitution. As a result, for the first time in human history, a World Constituent Assembly convened to draft and adopt the Constitution for the Federation of Earth.

== Death ==
Usborne died in Evesham, Worcestershire, at 87.

== Footnotes ==
Parliament of the United Kingdom
New constituency	Member of Parliament for Birmingham Acock's Green; 1945–1950	Constituency abolished
Preceded by Wesley Perrins	Member of Parliament for Birmingham Yardley; 1950–1959	Succeeded by Leonard Cleaver
