= David Bevan (politician) =

British politician

Member of Parliament for Birmingham Yardley
- In office 3 May 1979 – 16 March 1992
- Preceded by: Syd Tierney
- Succeeded by: Estelle Morris

Personal details
- Born: 10 April 1928
- Died: 12 October 1996 (aged 68) Sutton Coldfield
- Party: Conservative
- Spouse: Cynthia Bevan
- Education: Magdalen College, Oxford
- Profession: Estate agent

Andrew David Gilroy Bevan (10 April 1928 – 12 October 1996) was a British Conservative politician.

Bevan served on Birmingham City Council, and later West Midlands County Council, from 1959 to 1981. He was Member of Parliament for Birmingham Yardley from the 1979 general election until he lost the seat by 162 votes to future Labour minister Estelle Morris (now Baroness Morris of Yardley) in 1992.

During his time as an MP, Bevan worked to promote the British tourism industry. He was Chairman of the Parliamentary All-Party Tourism Committee, and Chairman of the Conservative Parliamentary Backbench Tourism Committee for several successive parliaments until he lost his seat.

Parliament of the United Kingdom
Preceded by Syd Tierney	Member of Parliament for Birmingham Yardley; 1979–1992	Succeeded by Estelle Morris
