= Birmingham Acock's Green =

Parliamentary constituency in the United Kingdom, 1945–1950

- Former borough constituency for the House of Commons
- Local government in West Midlands: West Midlands

1945–1950
- Seats: One
- Created from: Birmingham Moseley
- Replaced by: Birmingham Yardley (Majority) and Birmingham Hall Green (Part)

Birmingham Acock's Green was a short-lived constituency of the House of Commons of the Parliament of the United Kingdom from 1945 to 1950. It elected one Member of Parliament (MP) by the first past the post system of election.

== Boundaries ==
The County Borough of Birmingham wards of Acocks Green and Hall Green.

Before 1945 the area formed part of the Birmingham Moseley constituency. That division had over 100,000 electors and was considered to be overlarge. As an interim measure, before the Boundary Commission for England carried out the first periodic review of parliamentary boundaries, it was authorised by the House of Commons (Redistribution of Seats) Act 1944 (7 & 8 Geo. 6. c. 41) to divide the largest constituencies.

In the first periodic review, which was given effect by the Representation of the People Act 1948 (which applied from the United Kingdom general election, 1950), Acock's Green ward became part of Birmingham Yardley and Hall Green ward gave its name to the new seat of Birmingham Hall Green.

== Members of Parliament ==
Election	Member	Party	Notes
1945	Henry Usborne	Labour	Contested Birmingham Yardley following redistribution
1950	Constituency abolished		

== Election ==
General election 1945: Birmingham Acock's Green
Party	Candidate	Votes	%
Labour	Henry Usborne	19,951	49.5
Conservative	Arthur Maxwell	15,797	39.2
Liberal	William Hamsher	4,546	11.3
Majority		4,154	10.3
Turnout		55,880	72.1
Registered electors			
Labour win (new seat)			

== See also ==
- List of former United Kingdom Parliament constituencies
