= Birmingham Yardley =

Parliamentary constituency in the United Kingdom, 1918 onwards

Coordinates: 52.46°N 1.82°W

- Borough constituency for the House of Commons
- Boundaries since 2024
- Boundary of Birmingham Yardley in West Midlands region
- County: West Midlands
- Population: 106,738 (2011 census)
- Electorate: 73,261 (December 2010)

Current constituency
- Created: 1918
- Member of Parliament: Jess Phillips (Labour)
- Seats: One
- Created from: Birmingham East, Birmingham Bordesley and East Worcestershire

Birmingham Yardley is a constituency (Note: A borough constituency (for the purposes of election expenses and type of returning officer)) of part of the city of Birmingham represented in the House of Commons of the UK Parliament since 2015 by Jess Phillips of the Labour Party. (Note: As with all constituencies, the constituency elects one Member of Parliament (MP) by the first past the post system of election at least every five years.)

Yardley Rural District was annexed to Birmingham under the 1911 Greater Birmingham Act.

== Constituency profile ==
The seat lies within Birmingham to the east of the city centre. It includes the areas of Stechford, Yardley, Acocks Green, Sheldon and the industrial area of Tyseley. The western areas of the constituency around Small Heath and Tyseley are inner-city in character with mostly terraced houses, whilst the eastern parts are suburban with mostly detached or semi-detached housing.

The constituency has high levels of deprivation and residents are less likely to be degree-educated or work in professional jobs compared to national averages. The constituency is ethnically diverse; 44% of residents are White, 41% are Asian (primarily Pakistani) and 6% are Black. Most of the constituency elected Liberal Democrat councillors at the most recent city council election in 2026, whilst two Reform UK councillors were elected, and one Green Party councillor. An estimated 57% of voters in the constituency supported leaving the European Union in the 2016 referendum, higher than the national figure of 52%.

== Boundaries ==
1918–1950: The County Borough of Birmingham wards of Saltley, Small Heath and Yardley.

1950–1955: The County Borough of Birmingham wards of Acocks Green and Yardley.

1955–1983: The County Borough of Birmingham wards of Acocks Green, Sheldon and Yardley.

1983–1997: The City of Birmingham wards of Acocks Green, Sheldon and Yardley (as they existed on 1 February 1983).

1997–2010: The City of Birmingham wards of Acocks Green, Sheldon and Yardley (as they existed on 1 June 1994).

2010–2018: The City of Birmingham wards of Acocks Green, Sheldon, South Yardley, and Stechford and Yardley North.

2018–2024: Following a local government boundary review, which did not effect the parliamentary boundaries, the contents of the constituency were as follows with effect from May 2018:

- The City of Birmingham wards of Acocks Green, Garretts Green, Sheldon, South Yardley, Tyseley & Hay Mills, Yardley East, and Yardley West & Stechford, and small parts of Bordesley Green, Glebe Farm & Tile Cross, Hall Green North, Small Heath and Sparkbrook & Balsall Heath East.

2024–present: Further to the 2023 periodic review of Westminster constituencies which came into effect for the 2024 general election, the constituency comprises:

- The City of Birmingham wards of Acocks Green; Sheldon; Small Heath; South Yardley; Tyseley & Hay Mills; Yardley East; Yardley West & Stechford.

The Garretts Green ward was transferred to Birmingham Hodge Hill and Solihull North in exchange for the bulk of the Small Heath ward. Remaining part wards removed.

== Members of Parliament ==
From the seat's creation in 1918 until the 2005 general election, the MP elected for Birmingham Yardley was on all but three occasions a member of the party that won the general election, making it a former bellwether seat. Exceptions were Labour wins in the constituency compared to Conservative wins nationally in 1951, 1955 and 1992.

Election	Member	Party	Notes
1918	Alfred Jephcott	Unionist	
1929	Archibald Gossling	Labour	
1931	Edward Salt	Conservative	
1945	Wesley Perrins	Labour	
Constituency split, majority formed Birmingham Small Heath, minority merged with the majority of the abolished Birmingham Acock's Green
1950	Henry Usborne	Labour	Member for Birmingham Acock's Green (1945–1950)
1959	Leonard Cleaver	Conservative	
1964	Ioan Evans	Labour	Comptroller of the Household (1968–1970)
1970	Derek Coombs	Conservative	
Feb 1974	Syd Tierney	Labour	
1979	David Bevan	Conservative	
1992	Estelle Morris	Labour	Secretary of State for Education and Skills (2001–2002), Minister of State for the Arts (2003–2005)
2005	John Hemming	Liberal Democrat	
2015	Jess Phillips	Labour	Parliamentary Under-Secretary of State for Safeguarding and Violence Against Women and Girls (2024–2026)

== Elections ==
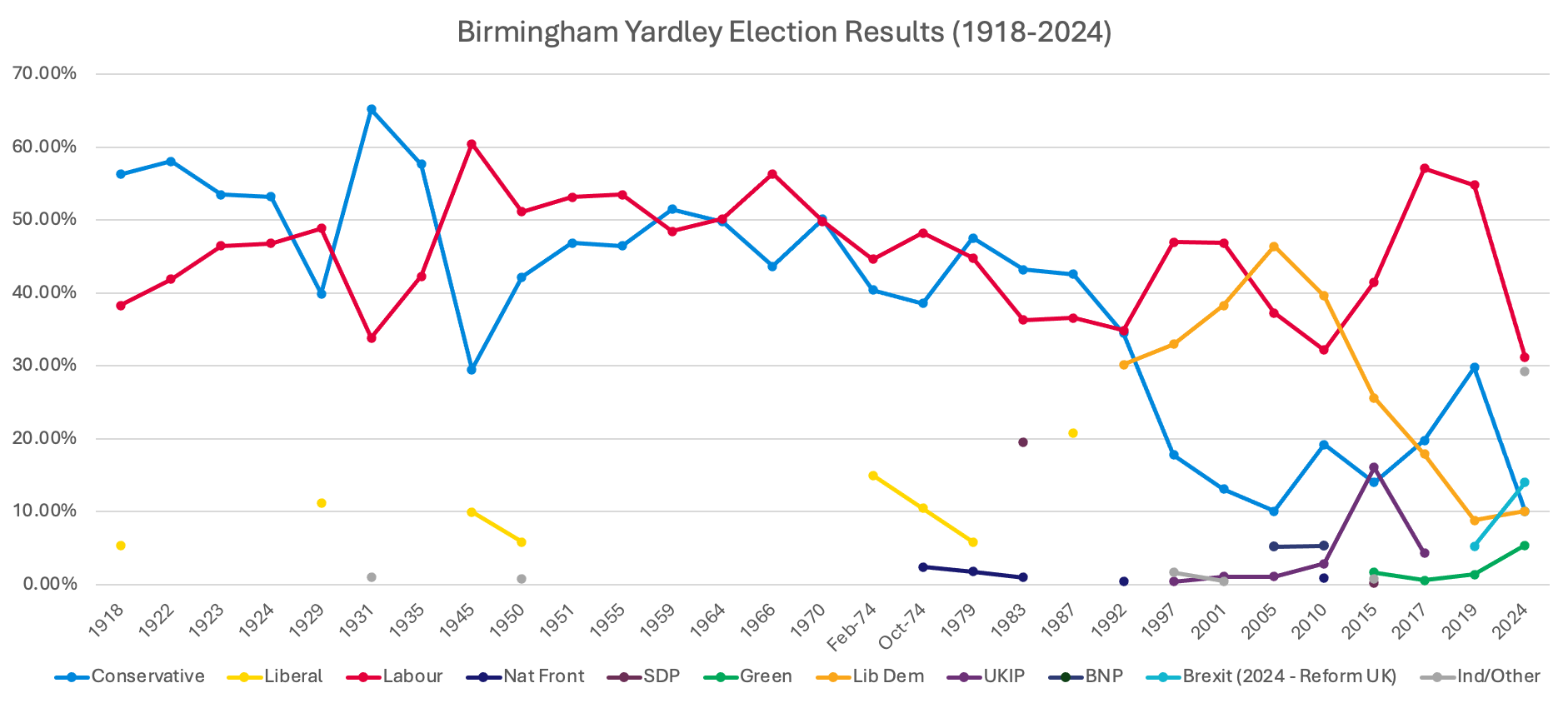
Results of Elections in Birmingham Yardley between 1918 and 2024

=== Elections in the 2020s ===
General election 2024: Birmingham Yardley
Party	Candidate	Votes	%	±%
Labour	Jess Phillips	11,275	31.2	▼26.9
Workers Party	Jody McIntyre	10,582	29.3	new
Reform	Nora Kamberi	5,061	14.0	▲9.0
Conservative	Yvonne Clements	3,634	10.1	▼16.7
Liberal Democrats	Roger Harmer	3,634	10.1	▲1.1
Green	Roxanne Green	1,958	5.4	▲4.2
Majority		693	1.9	▼23.1
Turnout		36,144	49.4	▼8.9
Registered electors		73,203		
Labour hold		Swing	▼28.1	

2019 notional result
Party	Vote	%
Labour	24,349	58.1
Conservative	11,208	26.7
Liberal Democrats	3,743	8.9
Brexit Party	2,103	5.0
Green	503	1.2
Turnout	41,906	58.3
Electorate	71,912	

=== Elections in the 2010s ===
General election 2019: Birmingham Yardley
Party	Candidate	Votes	%	±%
Labour	Jess Phillips	23,379	54.8	▼2.3
Conservative	Vincent Garrington	12,720	29.8	▲10.0
Liberal Democrats	Roger Harmer	3,754	8.8	▼9.1
Brexit Party	Mary McKenna	2,246	5.3	new
Green	Christopher Garghan	579	1.4	▲0.8
Majority		10,659	25.0	▼12.3
Turnout		42,678	57.3	▼4.0
Registered electors				
Labour hold		Swing	▼6.1	

General election 2017: Birmingham Yardley
Party	Candidate	Votes	%	±%
Labour	Jess Phillips	25,398	57.1	▲15.6
Conservative	Mohammed Afzal	8,824	19.8	▲5.8
Liberal Democrats	John Hemming	7,984	17.9	▼7.7
UKIP	Paul Clayton	1,916	4.3	▼11.8
Green	Christopher Garghan	280	0.6	▼1.1
Independent	Abu Nowshed	100	0.2	New
Majority		16,574	37.3	▲21.4
Turnout		44,502	61.3	▲4.0
Registered electors				
Labour hold		Swing	▲4.8	

General election 2015: Birmingham Yardley
Party	Candidate	Votes	%	±%
Labour	Jess Phillips	17,129	41.5	▲9.3
Liberal Democrats	John Hemming	10,534	25.6	▼14.0
UKIP	Paul Clayton	6,637	16.1	▲13.2
Conservative	Arun Photay	5,760	14.0	▼5.2
Green	Grant Bishop	698	1.7	New
Respect	Teval Stephens	187	0.5	New
TUSC	Eamonn Flynn	135	0.3	New
SDP	Peter Johnson	71	0.2	New
Majority		6,595	15.9	N/A
Turnout		41,151	57.0	▲0.8
Registered electors				
Labour gain from Liberal Democrats		Swing	▲11.7	

General election 2010: Birmingham Yardley
Party	Candidate	Votes	%	±%
Liberal Democrats	John Hemming	16,162	39.6	▼2.5
Labour	Lynnette Kelly	13,160	32.2	▼2.5
Conservative	Meirion Jenkins	7,836	19.2	▲8.6
BNP	Tanya Lumby	2,153	5.3	▲0.1
UKIP	Graham Duffen	1,190	2.9	▲1.8
National Front	Paul Morris	349	0.9	▲0.5
Majority		3,002	7.4	0.0
Turnout		40,850	56.5	▲2.0
Registered electors				
Liberal Democrats hold		Swing		

2005 notional result
Party	Vote	%
Liberal Democrats	16,485	42.0
Labour	13,621	34.7
Conservative	4,142	10.6
Others	2,581	6.6
BNP	1,523	3.9
UKIP	670	1.7
Green	201	0.5
Turnout	39,223	54.5
Electorate	71,986	

=== Elections in the 2000s ===
General election 2005: Birmingham Yardley
Party	Candidate	Votes	%	±%
Liberal Democrats	John Hemming	13,648	46.4	▲8.1
Labour	Jayne Innes	10,976	37.3	▼9.6
Conservative	Paul Uppal	2,970	10.1	▼3.0
BNP	Robert Purcell	1,523	5.2	New
UKIP	Mohammed Yaqub	314	1.1	0.0
Majority		2,672	9.1	N/A
Turnout		29,431	57.7	▲0.5
Registered electors				
Liberal Democrats gain from Labour		Swing	▼8.8	

General election 2001: Birmingham Yardley
Party	Candidate	Votes	%	±%
Labour	Estelle Morris	14,085	46.9	▼0.1
Liberal Democrats	John Hemming	11,507	38.3	▲5.3
Conservative	Barrie Roberts	3,941	13.1	▼4.7
UKIP	Alan Ware	329	1.1	▲0.7
Socialist Labour	Colin Wren	151	0.5	New
Majority		2,578	8.6	▼5.4
Turnout		30,011	57.2	▼14.0
Registered electors				
Labour hold		Swing		

=== Elections in the 1990s ===
General election 1997: Birmingham Yardley
Party	Candidate	Votes	%	±%
Labour	Estelle Morris	17,778	47.0	▲12.1
Liberal Democrats	John Hemming	12,463	33.0	▲2.8
Conservative	Anne Jobson	6,736	17.8	▼16.7
Referendum	Duncan Livingston	646	1.7	New
UKIP	Alan Ware	164	0.4	New
Majority		5,315	14.0	▲13.6
Turnout		37,787	71.2	▼6.8
Registered electors				
Labour hold		Swing		

General election 1992: Birmingham Yardley
Party	Candidate	Votes	%	±%
Labour	Estelle Morris	14,884	34.9	▼1.7
Conservative	David Bevan	14,722	34.5	▼8.1
Liberal Democrats	John Hemming	12,899	30.2	▲9.4
National Front	Pauline Read	192	0.4	New
Majority		162	0.4	N/A
Turnout		42,697	78.0	▲4.1
Registered electors				
Labour gain from Conservative		Swing	▲3.2	

=== Elections in the 1980s ===
General election 1987: Birmingham Yardley
Party	Candidate	Votes	%	±%
Conservative	David Bevan	17,931	42.6	▼0.6
Labour	Geoff Edge	15,409	36.6	▲0.3
Liberal	Leslie Smith	8,734	20.8	▲1.3
Majority		2,522	6.0	▼0.9
Turnout		42,074	73.9	▲1.8
Registered electors				
Conservative hold		Swing		

General election 1983: Birmingham Yardley
Party	Candidate	Votes	%	±%
Conservative	David Bevan	17,986	43.2	▼6.7
Labour	Roger Godsiff	15,121	36.3	▼6.2
SDP	David Bennett	8,109	19.5	▲13.7
National Front	Robert Jones	415	1.0	▼0.7
Majority		2,865	6.9	▲4.2
Turnout		41,631	72.1	▼1.6
Registered electors		57,707		
Conservative hold		Swing	–0.2	

1979 notional result
Party	Vote	%
Conservative	22,285	49.9
Labour	19,016	42.6
Liberal	2,601	5.8
Others	778	1.7
Turnout	44,680	
Electorate		

=== Elections in the 1970s ===
General election 1979: Birmingham Yardley
Party	Candidate	Votes	%	±%
Conservative	David Bevan	20,193	47.6	+8.9
Labour	Syd Tierney	19,029	44.8	–3.5
Liberal	Susan Mary Anderson	2,491	5.9	–4.6
National Front	Harold Challendar	749	1.8	–0.6
Majority		1,164	2.75	N/A
Turnout		42,462	73.8	+0.7
Registered electors		57,574		–1,478
Conservative gain from Labour		Swing	+8.9	

General election October 1974: Birmingham Yardley
Party	Candidate	Votes	%	±%
Labour	Syd Tierney	20,834	48.3	+3.7
Conservative	Derek Coombs	16,664	38.6	–1.8
Liberal	John Aldridge	4,518	10.5	–4.5
National Front	Harold Challendar	1,034	2.4	New
More Prosperous Britain	Thomas Keen	111	0.3	New
Majority		4,170	9.7	
Turnout		43,161	73.1	–5.6
Registered electors		59,052		+456
Labour hold		Swing	+2.7	

General election February 1974: Birmingham Yardley
Party	Candidate	Votes	%	±%
Labour	Syd Tierney	20,580	44.6	–4.2
Conservative	Derek Coombs	18,633	40.4	–10.8
Liberal	John Aldridge	6,912	15.0	New
Majority		1,947	4.2	N/A
Turnout		39,213	78.7	+9.2
Registered electors		58,596		–1,247
Labour gain from Conservative		Swing	+3.3	

1970 notional result
Party	Vote	%
Conservative	21,300	51.2
Labour	20,300	48.8
Turnout	41,600	69.5
Electorate	59,843	

General election 1970: Birmingham Yardley
Party	Candidate	Votes	%	±%
Conservative	Derek Coombs	21,827	50.14	
Labour Co-op	Ioan Evans	21,707	49.86	
Majority		120	0.28	N/A
Turnout		43,534	69.70	
Registered electors				
Conservative gain from Labour		Swing		

=== Elections in the 1960s ===
General election 1966: Birmingham Yardley
Party	Candidate	Votes	%	±%
Labour Co-op	Ioan Evans	25,568	56.35	
Conservative	Leonard Cleaver	19,809	43.65	
Majority		5,759	12.70	
Turnout		45,377	77.62	
Registered electors				
Labour hold		Swing		

General election 1964: Birmingham Yardley
Party	Candidate	Votes	%	±%
Labour Co-op	Ioan Evans	22,788	50.19	
Conservative	Leonard Cleaver	22,619	49.81	
Majority		169	0.38	N/A
Turnout		45,407	77.05	
Registered electors				
Labour gain from Conservative		Swing		

=== Elections in the 1950s ===
General election 1959: Birmingham Yardley
Party	Candidate	Votes	%	±%
Conservative	Leonard Cleaver	23,482	51.52	
Labour	Henry Usborne	22,097	48.48	
Majority		1,385	3.04	N/A
Turnout		45,579	77.08	
Registered electors				
Conservative gain from Labour		Swing		

General election 1955: Birmingham Yardley
Party	Candidate	Votes	%
Labour	Henry Usborne	23,722	53.52
Conservative	Philip Holland	20,598	46.48
Majority		3,124	7.04
Turnout		44,320	75.02
Registered electors			
Labour win (new boundaries)			

General election 1951: Birmingham Yardley
Party	Candidate	Votes	%	±%
Labour	Henry Usborne	22,800	53.15	
Conservative	Albert E. Shaw	20,099	46.85	
Majority		2,701	6.30	
Turnout		42,899	82.51	
Registered electors				
Labour hold		Swing		

General election 1950: Birmingham Yardley
Party	Candidate	Votes	%
Labour	Henry Usborne	22,342	51.16
Conservative	Gordon Matthews	18,431	42.20
Liberal	A.S. Ritchie	2,553	5.85
Communist	Jim Faulkner	347	0.79
Majority		3,911	8.96
Turnout		43,673	84.32
Registered electors			
Labour win (new boundaries)			

=== Elections in the 1940s ===
General election 1945: Birmingham Yardley
Party	Candidate	Votes	%	±%
Labour	Wesley Perrins	33,835	60.49	+18.16
Conservative	Edward Salt	16,514	29.53	−28.14
Liberal	Charles Frederick Middleton	5,583	9.98	New
Majority		17,321	30.96	N/A
Turnout		55,932	69.21	+3.99
Registered electors				
Labour gain from Conservative		Swing	+23.15	

=== Elections in the 1930s ===
General election 1935: Birmingham Yardley
Party	Candidate	Votes	%	±%
Conservative	Edward Salt	25,717	57.67	−7.52
Labour	Charles Jarman	18,879	42.33	+8.50
Majority		6,838	15.34	−16.02
Turnout		44,596	65.22	−12.48
Registered electors				
Conservative hold		Swing	+8.01	

General election 1931: Birmingham Yardley
Party	Candidate	Votes	%	±%
Conservative	Edward Salt	32,061	65.19	+24.29
Labour	Archibald Gossling	16,640	33.83	−15.07
New Party	EJ Bartleet	479	0.97	New
Majority		15,421	31.36	N/A
Turnout		49,180	76.70	−1.1
Registered electors				
Conservative gain from Labour		Swing	+18.64	

=== Elections in the 1920s ===
General election 1929: Birmingham Yardley
Party	Candidate	Votes	%	±%
Labour	Archibald Gossling	23,956	48.9	▲2.1
Unionist	Edward Salt	19,590	39.9	▼13.3
Liberal	Charles Albert Beaumont	5,500	11.2	New
Majority		4,366	9.0	N/A
Turnout		49,046	77.8	▲0.5
Registered electors		63,068		
Labour gain from Unionist		Swing	▲7.7	

General election 1924: Birmingham Yardley
Party	Candidate	Votes	%	±%
Unionist	Alfred Jephcott	16,149	53.2	▼0.3
Labour	Archibald Gossling	14,184	46.8	▲0.3
Majority		1,965	6.4	▼0.6
Turnout		30,333	77.3	▲12.9
Registered electors		39,235		
Unionist hold		Swing	▼0.3	

General election 1923: Birmingham Yardley
Party	Candidate	Votes	%	±%
Unionist	Alfred Jephcott	13,300	53.5	▼4.6
Labour	Archibald Gossling	11,562	46.5	▲4.6
Majority		1,738	7.0	▼9.2
Turnout		24,862	64.4	▼6.1
Registered electors		38,591		
Unionist hold		Swing	▼4.6	

General election 1922: Birmingham Yardley
Party	Candidate	Votes	%	±%
Unionist	Alfred Jephcott	15,586	58.1	▲1.8
Labour	Archibald Gossling	11,234	41.9	▲3.6
Majority		4,352	16.2	▼1.8
Turnout		26,820	70.5	▲17.3
Registered electors		38,045		
Unionist hold		Swing	▼0.9	

=== Election in the 1910s ===
General election 1918: Birmingham Yardley
Party		Candidate	Votes	%
C	Unionist	Alfred Jephcott	10,960	56.3
	Labour	George Shann	7,466	38.3
	Liberal	George Jackson	1,049	5.4
Majority			3,494	18.0
Turnout			19,475	53.2
Registered electors			36,575	
	Unionist win (new seat)			
C indicates candidate endorsed by the coalition government.

== See also ==
- List of parliamentary constituencies in the West Midlands (county)
- List of parliamentary constituencies in West Midlands (region)
