= Constituency election results in the 1922 United Kingdom general election =

30th Parliament	(Dec. 1910)
31st Parliament	(1918)
32nd Parliament	(1922)
33rd Parliament	(1923)
34th Parliament	(1924)

This is an in-complete alphabetical list of constituency election results to the 32nd Parliament of the United Kingdom at the 1922 general election, held on Wednesday 15 November 1922.

== Notes ==
- Change in % vote and swing is calculated between the winner and second place and their respective performances at the 1918 election. A plus denotes a swing to the winner and a minus against the winner.

== England ==
=== London Boroughs ===
Balham and Tooting
Party	Candidate	Votes	%	±%
Unionist	Alfred Butt	17,239	68.2	+8.5
Liberal	Joseph William Molden	8,044	31.8	+24.4
Majority		9,195	36.4	−6.1
Turnout			61.1	+9.4
Unionist hold		Swing	-8.0	

Battersea North
Party	Candidate	Votes	%	±%
Communist	Shapurji Saklatvala	11,311	50.5	n/a
National Liberal	Henry Hogbin	9,290	41.6	n/a
Liberal	Vivian Claude Albu	1,756	7.9	n/a
Majority		2,021	9.5	n/a
Turnout				
Communist gain from National Liberal		Swing	n/a	

Battersea South
Party	Candidate	Votes	%	±%
Unionist	Francis Curzon	17,685	61.5	−6.7
Labour	Albert Winfield	11,050	38.5	+23.8
Majority		6,635	23.0	−30.5
Turnout			65.5	+12.1
Unionist hold		Swing	-15.2	

Bermondsey West
Party	Candidate	Votes	%	±%
Labour	Alfred Salter	7,550	44.6	+26.1
Liberal	Roderick Kedward	5,225	30.9	−9.7
National Liberal	Charles Richard Scriven	2,814	16.6	−11.9
Ind. Unionist	Charles Louis Nordon	1,328	7.9	n/a
Majority		2,325	13.7	25.8
Turnout		26,168	64.6	+19.1
Labour gain from Liberal		Swing	+17.9	

Bethnal Green North East
Party	Candidate	Votes	%	±%
Liberal	Garnham Edmonds	5,774	36.1	−20.3
Communist	Walter Windsor	5,659	35.3	n/a
Unionist	Eric Alfred Hoffgaard	2,806	17.5	n/a
National Liberal	George Garro-Jones	1,780	11.5	n/a
Majority		115	0.8	−26.3
Turnout		27,262	58.8	+27.6
Liberal hold		Swing	n/a	

Bethnal Green South West
Party	Candidate	Votes	%	±%
Liberal	Percy Harris	5,152	40.7	+12.3
Communist	Joe Vaughan	4,034	31.9	n/a
Unionist	Mathew Wilson	3,474	27.4	−24.9
Majority		1,118	8.8	37.2
Turnout		21,129	59.9	+18.3
Liberal gain from Unionist		Swing	n/a	

Bow and Bromley
Party	Candidate	Votes	%	±%
Labour	George Lansbury	15,402	64.1	+19.8
Unionist	Geoffrey Duveen	8,626	35.9	−13.8
Majority		6,776	28.2	33.6
Turnout		34,383	69.9	+21.0
Labour hold		Swing	+16.8	

Brixton
Party	Candidate	Votes	%	±%
Unionist	Davison Dalziel	11,284	54.8	−6.5
Liberal	Frederick Joseph Laverack	9,316	45.2	+29.1
Majority		1,968	9.6	−29.1
Turnout			52.8	+10.0
Unionist hold		Swing	-17.8	

Camberwell North
Party	Candidate	Votes	%	±%
Labour	Charles Ammon	8,320	50.8	+29.8
Unionist	Helen Gwynne-Vaughan	8,066	49.2	−8.8
Majority		254	1.6	38.6
Turnout		16,386	56.7	+17.5
Labour gain from Unionist		Swing	+19.3	

Macnamara

Camberwell North West
Party	Candidate	Votes	%	±%
Liberal	Thomas James Macnamara	6,843	34.8	n/a
Labour	Hyacinth Morgan	6,763	34.4	+3.5
Unionist	Edward Campbell	6,045	30.8	n/a
Majority		80	0.4	−18.3
Turnout			61.9	−1.9
Liberal hold		Swing	n/a	

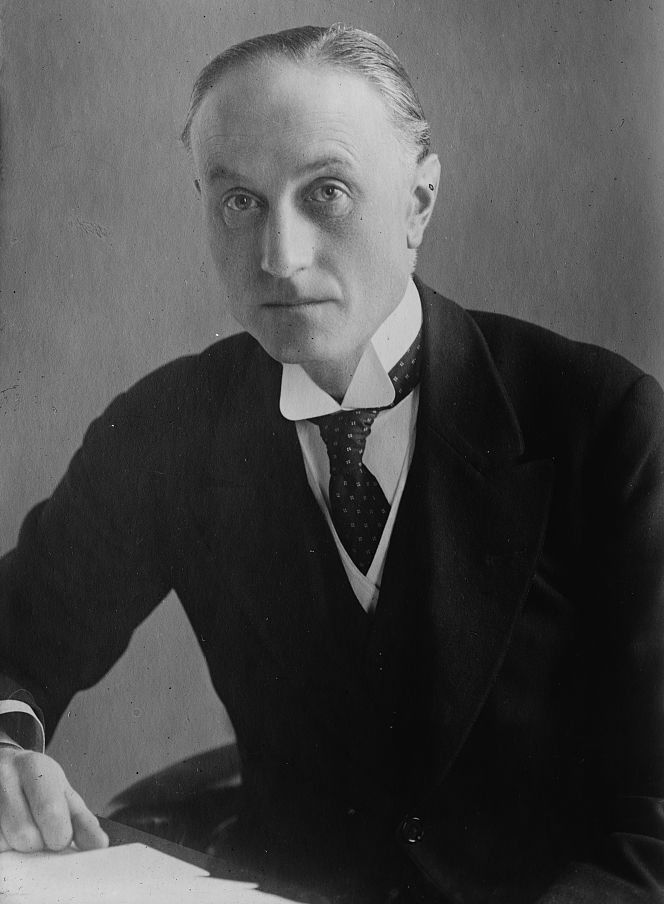
Hoare

Chelsea
Party	Candidate	Votes	%	±%
Unionist	Samuel Hoare	13,437	74.9	−4.3
Labour	Bertrand Russell	4,513	25.1	+25.1
Majority		8,924	49.7	+8.5
Turnout		28,453	63.1	+16.4
Unionist hold		Swing	-14.7	

City of London (2 seats)
Party	Candidate	Votes	%	±%
Unionist	Frederick Banbury	Unopposed	n/a	n/a
Unionist	Edward Grenfell	Unopposed	n/a	n/a
Unionist hold		Swing	n/a	

Leigh

Clapham
Party	Candidate	Votes	%	±%
Unionist	John Leigh	13,285	58.7	
Labour	Leopold Spero	4,919	21.7	n/a
Liberal	Ernest Villiers	4,444	19.6	
Majority		8,366	37.0	
Turnout		22,648		
Unionist hold		Swing		

Deptford
Party	Candidate	Votes	%	±%
Labour	C. W. Bowerman	18,512	52.6	
Unionist	Marshall James Pike	16,687	47.4	
Majority		1,825	5.2	
Turnout		35,199		
Labour hold		Swing		

Dulwich
Party	Candidate	Votes	%	±%
Unionist	Frederick Hall	14,046	67.6	
Liberal	C. R. Cooke-Taylor	6,733	32.4	
Majority		7,313	35.2	
Turnout		20,779		
Unionist hold		Swing		

Fulham East
Party	Candidate	Votes	%	±%
Unionist	Kenyon Vaughan-Morgan	13,282	61.5	−7.9
Labour	John Palmer	5,393	35.0	+15.5
Liberal	Maurice Gordon Liverman	2,907	13.5	+2.4
Majority		7,889	26.5	−23.4
Turnout			58.0	+17.2
Unionist hold		Swing	-11.7	

Fulham West
Party	Candidate	Votes	%	±%
Unionist	Cyril Cobb	14,875	64.4	−0.5
Labour	Robert Mark Gentry	8,210	35.6	+11.9
Majority		6,665	28.8	−12.4
Turnout		23,085	58.4	+11.5
Unionist hold		Swing	-5.7	

Hume

Greenwich
Party	Candidate	Votes	%	±%
Unionist	George Hume	16,933	61	−8.3
Labour	Edward Timothy Palmer	10,861	39.0	+8.3
Majority		6,072	21.8	−16.7
Turnout		27,794	60.4	
Unionist hold		Swing		

Lever

Hackney Central
Party	Candidate	Votes	%	±%
National Liberal	Arthur Lever	9,795	46.4	n/a
Liberal	McKinnon Wood	6,825	32.3	n/a
Labour	Arthur Lynch	4,507	21.3	n/a
Majority		2,970	14.1	n/a
Turnout		21,127	60.3	n/a
National Liberal gain from Liberal		Swing	n/a	

Hackney North
Party	Candidate	Votes	%	±%
Conservative	Walter Greene	13,002	60.8	−9.8
Liberal	Philip Guedalla	8,387	39.2	+9.8
Majority		4,615	21.6	−19.6
Turnout		21,389	63.5	+13.2
Conservative hold		Swing	-9.8	

Hackney South
Party	Candidate	Votes	%	±%
Unionist	Clifford Erskine-Bolst	14,017	51.4	n/a
Labour	Holford Knight	9,276	48.6	n/a
Majority		4,741	17.4	n/a
Turnout				
Unionist gain from Independent		Swing	n/a	

Hammersmith North
Party	Candidate	Votes	%	±%
Unionist	Henry Foreman	8,253	46.3	−0.2
Labour	James Patrick Gardner	5,350	29.8	+13.4
Liberal	Frederick L Coysh	4,278	23.9	+3.5
Majority		2,953	16.5	−9.6
Turnout			60.0	+13.3
Unionist hold		Swing		

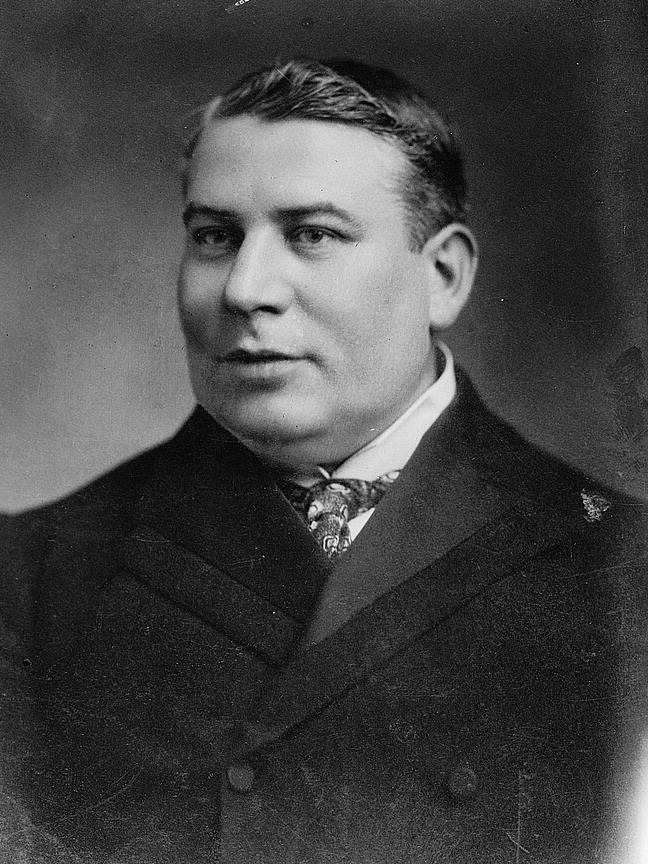
Bull

Hammersmith South
Party	Candidate	Votes	%	±%
Unionist	William Bull	10,877	63.0	−2.5
Labour	Wyndham James Albery	6,397	37.0	+22.1
Majority		4,480	26.0	−24.6
Turnout			56.4	
Unionist hold		Swing	-12.3	

Hampstead
Party	Candidate	Votes	%	±%
Unionist	George Balfour	14,596	59.7	−11.1
National Liberal	Albert Clavering	5,582	22.9	n/a
Liberal	L S Fletcher	4,282	17.5	n/a
Majority		9,014	36.9	−14.6
Turnout		24,460	63.1	+5.0
Unionist hold		Swing	n/a	

Holborn
Party	Candidate	Votes	%	±%
Unionist	James Remnant	8,996	70.5	−15.8
Liberal	John Salter Stooke-Vaughan	3,757	29.5	n/a
Majority		5,239	41.0	−31.6
Turnout		26,991	47.2	+8.1
Unionist hold		Swing	N/A	

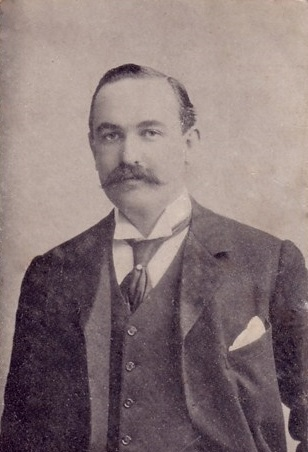
Baring

Islington East
Party	Candidate	Votes	%	±%
Unionist	Austin Hudson	11,954	46.1	−2.7
Liberal	Godfrey Baring	8,107	31.2	+0.1
Labour	Ethel Bentham	5,900	22.7	+6.4
Majority		3,847	14.9	−2.8
Turnout			59.4	+7.7
Unionist hold		Swing	-1.4	

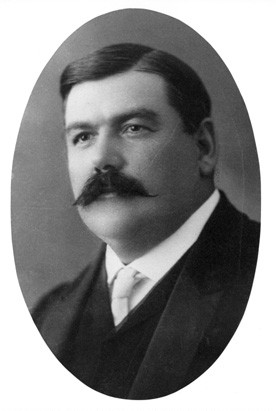
Moore

Islington North
Party	Candidate	Votes	%	±%
Unionist	Newton Moore	13,520	47.0	−21.5
Labour	Edith Picton-Turbervill	7,993	27.8	n/a
Liberal	Norman Thomas Carr Sargant	7,256	25.2	+13.0
Majority		5,527	19.2	−30.0
Turnout				
Unionist hold		Swing	n/a	

Islington South
Party	Candidate	Votes	%	±%
Unionist	Charles Garland	7,877	36.1	−17.8
Liberal	Thomas Wiles	7,352	33.6	−12.5
Labour	Frederick Pethick-Lawrence	6,634	30.3	n/a
Majority		525	2.5	−5.4
Turnout			64.2	+20.1
Unionist hold		Swing	-2.7	

Islington West
Party	Candidate	Votes	%	±%
Unionist	James Despencer-Robertson	7,335	38.9	−6.5
Liberal	Henry Mills	6,643	35.3	+11.6
Labour	W J Lewington	4,856	25.8	+4.9
Majority		592	3.6	−18.1
Turnout			57.5	+15.4
Unionist hold		Swing	-9.1	

Gosling

Kennington
Party	Candidate	Votes	%	±%
Unionist	Francis Capel Harrison	10,081	47.3	+15.1
Labour	Harry Gosling	7,670	36.1	+10.7
National Liberal	Henry Purchase	3,522	16.6	−25.8
Majority		2,411	11.2	n/a
Turnout		36,451	58.4	+28.7
Unionist gain from National Liberal		Swing	n/a	

Kensington North
Party	Candidate	Votes	%	±%
Unionist	Percy George Gates	12,328	53.1	−25.2
Labour	William Joseph Jarrett	6,225	26.8	+5.1
Liberal	Charles W. Hayward	4,666	20.1	N/A
Majority		6,103	26.3	
Turnout		42,328	54.9	+10.7
Unionist hold		Swing	-15.2	

Kensington South
Party	Candidate	Votes	%	±%
Unionist	William Davison	15,760	76.0	+9.2
Independent	Ferdinand Cavendish-Bentinck	4,964	24.0	n/a
Majority		10,796	52.0	+18.4
Turnout		35,684	58.1	+6.3
Unionist hold		Swing	n/a	

Lambeth North
Party	Candidate	Votes	%	±%
Liberal	Frank Briant	8,132	43.1	−19.2
Unionist	Ernest Roy Bird	7,362	39.1	+1.4
Labour	Barbara Ayrton-Gould	3,353	17.8	n/a
Majority		770	4.0	−20.6
Turnout			62.2	+21.3
Liberal hold		Swing	-10.3	

Lewisham East
Party	Candidate	Votes	%	±%
Unionist	Assheton Pownall	16,726	57.6	n/a
Labour	Ernest Wesley Wilton	8,402	28.9	n/a
Liberal	John Christian Langenmayr Zorn	3,906	13.5	n/a
Majority		8,324	28.7	n/a
Turnout		29,034	64.0	n/a
Unionist hold		Swing	n/a	

Lewisham West
Party	Candidate	Votes	%	±%
Unionist	Philip Dawson	16,216	65.7	n/a
Liberal	Barrett Lennard Albemarle O'Malley	8,469	34.3	n/a
Majority		7,747	31.4	n/a
Turnout			58.1	n/a
Unionist hold		Swing	n/a	

Limehouse
Party	Candidate	Votes	%	±%
Labour	Clement Attlee	9,688	55.4	+30.2
National Liberal	William Pearce	7,789	44.6	−15.3
Majority		1,899	10.8	45.5
Turnout			57.8	+23.1
Labour gain from National Liberal		Swing	+22.7	

Mile End
Party	Candidate	Votes	%	±%
Unionist	Walter Preston	6,014	41.0	−22.2
Labour	John Scurr	5,219	35.5	+10.4
Liberal	Robert Bernard Solomon	3,457	23.5	+11.8
Majority		795	5.5	−32.6
Turnout			63.8	+20.7
Unionist hold		Swing	-16.3	

Norwood
Party	Candidate	Votes	%	±%
Unionist	Walter Greaves-Lord	16,121	60.8	−5.0
Liberal	Richard Evan Williams Kirby	6,253	23.5	n/a
Labour	William Archer Hodgson	4,180	15.7	n/a
Majority		9,868	37.3	+5.7
Turnout		43,029	61.7	+13.2
Unionist hold		Swing	n/a	

Paddington North
Party	Candidate	Votes	%	±%
Unionist	William Perring	10,792	62.6	+29.2
Independent Liberal	George Augustine Jennings	6,444	37.4	n/a
Majority		4,348	25.2	+15.2
Turnout		17,236	45.6	−0.9
Unionist hold		Swing	n/a	

- adopted as official Liberal candidate, but party withdrew support during campaign following exposure of crooked past

Paddington South
Party	Candidate	Votes	%	±%
Unionist	Douglas King	9,699	67.1	n/a
Ind. Unionist	Ernest Edward Sawyer	4,764	32.9	n/a
Majority		4,935	34.2	n/a
Turnout			50.5	n/a
Unionist hold		Swing	n/a	

Peckham
Party	Candidate	Votes	%	±%
Unionist	Collingwood Hughes	11,218	44.4	+15.7
National Liberal	Henry Lesser	6,739	26.7	n/a
Labour	Walter Ashbridge Chambers	5,964	23.6	+7.5
Liberal	Gerald Spence Tetley	1,329	5.3	−49.9
Majority		4,479	17.7	44.2
Turnout		25,250	66.1	+23.1
Unionist gain from National Liberal		Swing	n/a	

Poplar South
Party	Candidate	Votes	%	±%
Labour	Samuel March	14,484	58.8	+33.2
National Liberal	Alfred William Yeo	10,146	41.2	−8.2
Majority		4,338	17.6	41.4
Turnout		37,026	66.5	+18.4
Labour gain from Liberal		Swing	+20.7	

Putney
Party	Candidate	Votes	%	±%
Unionist	Samuel Samuel	9,739	47.2	−16.4
Ind. Unionist	Cyril Prescott-Decie	5,556	27.0	N/A
Liberal	Henry Higgs	5,317	25.8	N/A
Majority		4,183	20.2	−7.0
Turnout		20,612	61.8	+18.4
Unionist hold		Swing	-16.4	

Rotherhithe
Party	Candidate	Votes	%	±%
Unionist	John Lort-Williams	6,749	36.5	−13.5
Labour	Charles Diamond	6,703	36.3	+20.8
Liberal	Hubert Carr-Gomm	5,034	27.2	−7.3
Majority		46	0.2	−15.3
Turnout			63.4	+18.3
Unionist hold		Swing	-17.1	

St. Marylebone
Party	Candidate	Votes	%	±%
Unionist	Douglas Hogg	unopposed	n/a	n/a
Unionist hold		Swing	n/a	

St Pancras North
Party	Candidate	Votes	%	±%
Unionist	John William Lorden	9,156	37.7	−3.7
Labour	John Gilbert Dale	8,165	33.6	+7.0
Liberal	Willoughby Dickinson	6,979	28.7	−3.3
Majority		991	4.1	−5.3
Turnout			66.0	+14.1
Unionist hold		Swing	-5.3	

St Pancras South East
Party	Candidate	Votes	%	±%
Unionist	John Hopkins	8,753	47.5	+9.7
Labour	Herbert Romeril	5,609	30.5	+13.6
Liberal	Leonard Benjamin Franklin	4,053	22.0	−5.8
Majority		3,144	17.0	+7.0
Turnout			60.1	+12.9
Unionist hold		Swing	-1.9	

St Pancras South West
Party	Candidate	Votes	%	±%
Unionist	Richard Barnett	8,289	49.4	−9.2
Liberal	Arthur Comyns Carr	5,533	33.0	−5.5
Labour	George Horne	2,947	17.6	n/a
Majority		2,756	16.4	−3.7
Turnout			57.9	+12.7
Unionist hold		Swing	-1.9	

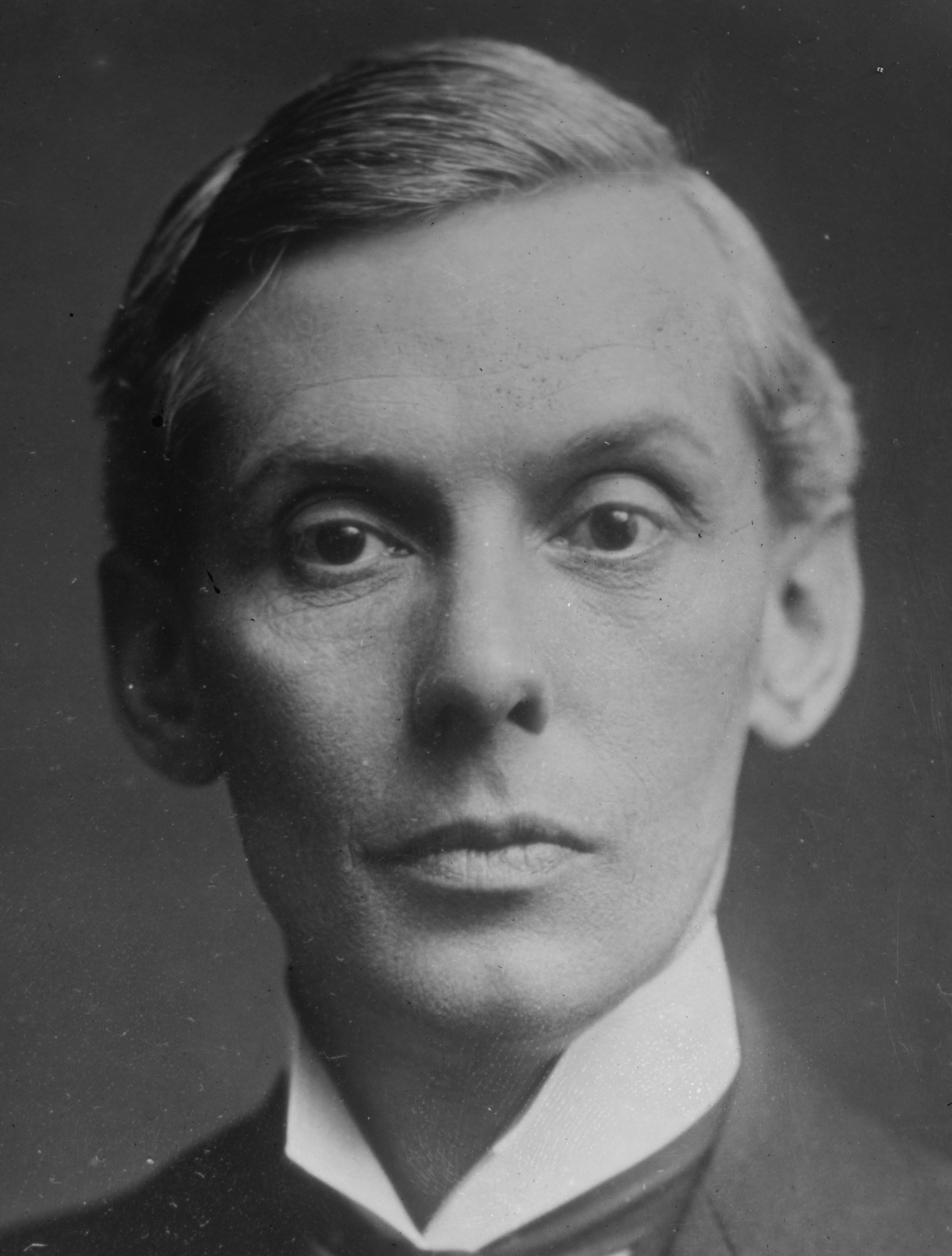
Addison

Shoreditch
Party	Candidate	Votes	%	±%
National Liberal	Ernest Griffith Price	9,084	37.6	n/a
Labour	Ernest Thurtle	8,834	36.5	n/a
Liberal	Christopher Addison	6,273	25.9	n/a
Majority		250	1.1	−34.8
Turnout			47.4	+10.1
National Liberal hold		Swing	n/a	

Southwark Central
Party	Candidate	Votes	%	±%
National Liberal	James Daniel Gilbert	10,522	65.6	−6.5
Labour	George Dobson Bell	5,522	34.4	+6.5
Majority		5,000	31.2	−13.0
National Liberal hold		Swing	-6.5	

Southwark North
Party	Candidate	Votes	%	±%
National Liberal	Edward Strauss	7,435	54.0	+6.9
Labour	Leslie Haden-Guest	6,323	46.0	+23.8
Majority		1,112	8.0	−14.9
Turnout			56.1	+15.7
National Liberal hold		Swing	-8.4	

Alexander

Southwark South East
Party	Candidate	Votes	%	±%
National Liberal	Maurice Alexander	10,014	56.4	−16.2
Labour	Thomas Naylor	7,734	43.6	+16.2
Majority		2,280	12.8	−32.4
Turnout			58.2	
National Liberal hold		Swing	-16.2	

Stoke Newington
Party	Candidate	Votes	%	±%
Unionist	George Jones	9,753	63.0	+8.9
Liberal	Percy Holt Heffer	5,737	37.0	+17.0
Majority		4,016	26.0	−2.2
Turnout			65.0	+10.6
Unionist hold		Swing	-4.0	

Streatham
Party	Candidate	Votes	%	±%
Unionist	William Lane-Mitchell	12,282	69.1	−3.8
Liberal	Oliver Ayton Minns	5,483	30.9	+15.5
Majority		6,799	38.2	−19.3
Turnout		17,765	63.0	+4.4
Unionist hold		Swing	-9.7	

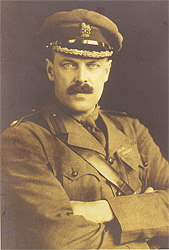
Norton-Griffiths

Wandsworth Central
Party	Candidate	Votes	%	±%
Unionist	John Norton-Griffiths	12,470	69.7	+14.7
Labour	Lewis Silkin	5,420	30.3	+6.4
Majority		7,050	39.4	+8.3
Turnout		17,890	61.4	+10.6
Unionist hold		Swing	+0.03	

Westminster Abbey
Party	Candidate	Votes	%	±%
Unionist	John Sanctuary Nicholson	13,620	75.6	n/a
Labour	Joseph Butler	2,454	13.6	n/a
Independent	Sidney Robert Drury-Lowe	1,950	10.8	n/a
Majority		11,166	62.0	n/a
Turnout		36,763	49.0	n/a
Unionist hold		Swing	n/a	

Westminster St George's
Party	Candidate	Votes	%	±%
Ind. Conservative	James Malcolm Monteith Erskine	11,252	55.9	n/a
Unionist	Leslie Orme Wilson	7,559	37.6	−52.6
Liberal	Mary Sophia Allen	1,303	6.5	−3.2
Majority		3,693	18.3	62.1
Turnout		20,114	62.2	+22.3
Ind. Conservative gain from Unionist		Swing	n/a	

Whitechapel and St Georges
Party	Candidate	Votes	%	±%
Labour	Charles James Mathew	6,267	40.2	+11.0
Liberal	James Kiley	5,839	37.4	+2.5
Unionist	Alfred Instone	3,502	22.4	−6.4
Majority		428	2.8	8.5
Turnout		24,333	64.1	+27.1
Labour gain from Liberal		Swing	+4.2	

Woolwich East
Party	Candidate	Votes	%	±%
Labour	Harry Snell	15,620	57.1	n/a
Unionist	Robert Gee	11,714	42.9	n/a
Majority		3,906	14.2	n/a
Turnout		33,993	80.4	n/a
Labour hold		Swing	n/a	

Woolwich West
Party	Candidate	Votes	%	±%
Unionist	Kingsley Wood	14,453	60.2	+0.1
Labour	John Thomas Sheppard	9,550	39.8	+5.3
Majority		4,903	20.4	−5.2
Turnout		24,003	70.1	+10.1
Unionist hold		Swing	−2.6	

=== English Boroughs ===
Buxton

Accrington
Party	Candidate	Votes	%	±%
Labour	Charles Roden Buxton	16,462	44.3	+22.6
Unionist	Ernest Gray	11,408	30.6	−16.6
Liberal	Harold Baker	9,395	25.1	−3.5
Majority		5,054	13.7	32.3
Turnout			88.7	+19.2
Labour gain from Unionist		Swing	+19.6	

Ashton-under-Lyne
Party	Candidate	Votes	%	±%
Unionist	Walter de Frece	12,006	57.6	−0.7
Labour	Thomas William Gillinder	8,834	42.4	n/a
Majority		3,172	15.2	−1.4
Turnout		20,840	83.3	+14.9
Unionist hold		Swing	n/a	

Barnsley
Party	Candidate	Votes	%	±%
Labour	John Potts	14,728	55.1	n/a
National Liberal	Maurice Moore	12,011	44.9	n/a
Majority		2,717	10.2	n/a
Turnout			75.7	n/a
Labour gain from National Liberal		Swing	n/a	

Barrow and Furness

=== English Counties ===
Bedfordshire, Bedford
Party	Candidate	Votes	%	±%
Unionist	Richard Wells	13,460	50.3	n/a
National Liberal	Frederick Kellaway	5,714	21.4	n/a
Labour	Arthur Sells	5,477	20.5	n/a
Liberal	Lady Lawson	2,075	7.8	n/a
Majority		7,746	28.9	n/a
Turnout		26,726	79.1	n/a
Unionist gain from National Liberal		Swing	n/a	

Bedfordshire, Luton
Party	Candidate	Votes	%	±%
Unionist	John Prescott Hewett	13,301	43.5	n/a
Liberal	Harry Arnold	10,137	33.2	−36.2
Labour	Percy Alden	7,107	23.3	−7.3
Majority		3,164	10.3	49.1
Turnout			81.0	+18.5
Unionist gain from Liberal		Swing	n/a	

Bedfordshire Mid
Party	Candidate	Votes	%	±%
Liberal	Frederick Linfield	11,874	56.5	+11.7
Unionist	Max Townley	9,137	43.5	−11.7
Majority		2,737	13.0	23.4
Turnout			70.1	+15.3
Liberal gain from Unionist		Swing	+11.7	

Berkshire, Abingdon
Party	Candidate	Votes	%	±%
Unionist	Arthur Loyd	10,507	51.3	n/a
Liberal	Edward Lessing	9,967	48.7	n/a
Majority		540	2.6	n/a
Turnout			77.1	n/a
Unionist hold		Swing	n/a	

Berkshire, Newbury
Party	Candidate	Votes	%	±%
Unionist	Howard Clifton Brown	12,322	57.4	n/a
Liberal	Innes Harold Stranger	9,144	42.6	n/a
Majority		3,178	14.8	n/a
Turnout		21,466	69.7	n/a
Unionist hold		Swing	n/a	

Berkshire, Windsor
Party	Candidate	Votes	%	±%
Unionist	Annesley Somerville	17,504	71.2	+1.8
Liberal	Charles Birch Crisp	7,087	28.8	n/a
Majority		10,417	42.4	+3.6
Turnout		24,591	65.7	+22.2
Unionist hold		Swing	n/a	

Buckinghamshire, Aylesbury
Party	Candidate	Votes	%	±%
Unionist	Lionel Nathan de Rothschild	13,406	51.1	n/a
Liberal	Thomas Keens	12,835	48.9	n/a
Majority		571	2.2	n/a
Turnout			71.4	n/a
Unionist hold		Swing	n/a	

Buckinghamshire, Buckingham
Party	Candidate	Votes	%	±%
Unionist	George Bowyer	13,751	49.4	−4.3
Labour	Owen Connellan	7,343	26.3	−6.0
Liberal	Charles Hobhouse	6,789	24.3	+9.3
Majority		6,408	23.1	+1.7
Turnout		27,883	76.9	+13.3
Unionist hold		Swing	+0.9	

Buckinghamshire, Wycombe
Party	Candidate	Votes	%	±%
Unionist	William Baring du Pré	15,627	50.1	n/a
Liberal	Vera Woodhouse	11,154	35.8	n/a
Labour	Samuel Stennett	4,403	14.1	n/a
Majority		4,473	14.3	n/a
Turnout			69.2	n/a
Unionist hold		Swing		

Cambridgeshire
Party	Candidate	Votes	%	±%
Unionist	Harold Stannus Gray	9,846	38.0	n/a
Labour	A. E. Stubbs	9,167	35.3	+0.4
National Liberal	Edwin Montagu	6,942	26.7	−38.4
Majority		679	2.7	
Turnout		25,955	70.8	+19.5
Unionist gain from Liberal		Swing	+38.2	

Cheshire, Altrincham
Party	Candidate	Votes	%	±%
Unionist	George Hamilton	19,361	53.8	−18.9
Liberal	Robert Alstead	11,692	32.5	n/a
Labour	George Benson	4,930	13.7	−13.6
Majority		7,669	21.3	n/a
Turnout		35,983	79.8	+11.3
Unionist hold		Swing	n/a	

Cheshire, Chester
Party	Candidate	Votes	%	±%
Unionist	Charles Cayzer	11,938	54.1	−2.2
Labour	George Muff	5,414	24.6	+8.9
Liberal	Joseph Banks	4,688	21.3	−6.7
Majority		6,524	29.5	+1.2
Turnout			81.2	+16.0
Unionist hold		Swing	-5.5	

Hemmerde

Cheshire, Crewe
Party	Candidate	Votes	%	±%
Labour	Edward Hemmerde	15,311	50.9	+7.1
National Liberal	Joseph Davies	14,756	49.1	−7.1
Majority		555	1.8	N/A
Turnout		30,067	80.9	+12.5
Labour gain from Liberal		Swing	+7.1	

Cheshire, Eddisbury
Party	Candidate	Votes	%	±%
Unionist	Harry Barnston	Unopposed		
Unionist hold				

Cheshire, Knutsford
Party	Candidate	Votes	%	±%
Unionist	Ernest Makins	15,650	57.9	n/a
Liberal	Percy Butlin	11,388	42.1	n/a
Majority		4,262	15.8	n/a
Turnout			77.2	n/a
Unionist hold		Swing	n/a	

Cheshire, Macclesfield
Party	Candidate	Votes	%	±%
Unionist	John Remer	15,825	48.1	−10.1
Liberal	Thomas Artemus Jones	10,477	31.9	N/A
Labour	Andrew Joseph Penston	6,584	20.0	−21.8
Majority		5,348	16.2	−0.2
Turnout		32,886	86.0	+18.9
Unionist hold		Swing	+5.9	

Cheshire, Northwich
Party	Candidate	Votes	%	±%
Unionist	Colum Crichton-Stuar	15,454	54.2	−7.2
Labour	John Williams	13,066	45.8	n/a
Majority			8.4	−14.4
Turnout			71.6	+7.5
Unionist hold		Swing		

Cheshire, Stalybridge and Hyde
Party	Candidate	Votes	%	±%
Unionist	John Phillips Rhodes	17,216	49.1	−2.3
Liberal	John Lincoln Tattersall	10,265	29.3	+5.5
Labour	Percy Horace Ward	7,578	21.6	−3.2
Majority		6,951	19.8	−6.8
Turnout			81.1	+21.1
Unionist hold		Swing	-3.9	

Cheshire, Wirral
Party	Candidate	Votes	%	±%
Unionist	Gershom Stewart	12,888	51.0	n/a
Liberal	Stephen Roxby Dodds	8,014	31.7	n/a
Labour	James Edward Cameron Grant	4,363	17.3	n/a
Majority		4,874	19.3	n/a
Turnout			74.0	n/a
Unionist hold		Swing		

Cornwall, Bodmin
Party	Candidate	Votes	%	±%
Liberal	Isaac Foot	14,292	53.4	+11.8
Unionist	Frederick Poole	12,467	46.6	−11.8
Majority		1,825	6.8	23.6
Turnout			80.4	+10.9
Liberal gain from Unionist		Swing	+11.8	

Cornwall, Camborne
Party	Candidate	Votes	%	±%
National Liberal	Algernon Moreing	8,191	39.7	n/a
Liberal	Leif Jones	7,923	38.4	n/a
Labour	Tom Proctor	4,512	21.9	−26.1
Majority		268	1.3	
Turnout			60.5	+18.7
National Liberal gain from Liberal		Swing	n/a	

Cornwall, North
Party	Candidate	Votes	%	±%
National Liberal	George Marks	unopposed	n/a	n/a
National Liberal hold		Swing	n/a	

Cornwall, Penryn and Falmouth
Party	Candidate	Votes	%	±%
Unionist	Denis Shipwright	11,566	42.7	−7.9
Liberal	Courtenay Mansel	8,879	32.8	−16.6
Labour	Joseph Harris	4,482	16.6	n/a
National Liberal	George Hay Morgan	2,129	7.9	n/a
Majority		2,687	9.9	+8.7
Turnout			72.5	+15.9
Unionist hold		Swing	+4.3	

Cornwall, St Ives
Party	Candidate	Votes	%	±%
Unionist	Anthony Hawke	10,388	53.5	n/a
National Liberal	Clifford Cory	9,016	46.5	−12.1
Majority		1,372	7.0	27.2
Turnout		19,404	65.6	+13.9
Unionist gain from National Liberal		Swing	n/a	

Cumberland, North
Party	Candidate	Votes	%	±%
Unionist	Donald Howard	8,815	50.8	n/a
Liberal	Geoffrey Howard	8,544	49.2	n/a
Majority		271	1.6	n/a
Turnout		17,359	79.9	n/a
Unionist hold		Swing	n/a	

Cumberland, Penrith and Cockermouth
Party	Candidate	Votes	%	±%
Liberal	Levi Collison	9,114	51.1	n/a
Unionist	Henry Lowther	8,736	48.9	n/a
Majority		378	2.2	n/a
Turnout			83.0	n/a
Liberal gain from Speaker		Swing	n/a	

Cumberland, Whitehaven
Party	Candidate	Votes	%	±%
Labour	Thomas Gavan-Duffy	10,935	45.3	−0.3
Unionist	James Augustus Grant	8,956	37.2	−17.2
Liberal	Henry Kenyon Campbell	4,209	17.5	n/a
Majority		1,979	8.1	16.9
Turnout			87.0	+15.0
Labour gain from Unionist		Swing	+8.4	

Cumberland, Workington
Party	Candidate	Votes	%	±%
Labour	Thomas Cape	14,546	54.7	+3.2
Unionist	Lancelot Evelyn Gaunt	12,064	45.3	+16.0
Majority		2,482	9.4	−12.8
Turnout		26,610	83.7	+13.0
Labour hold		Swing	−6.4	

Derbyshire, Belper
Party	Candidate	Votes	%	±%
Liberal	John Hancock	12,494	61.1	n/a
Labour	Oliver Wright	7,942	38.9	n/a
Majority		4,552	22.2	n/a
Turnout		20,436	63.6	n/a
Liberal hold		Swing	n/a	

Kenyon

Derbyshire, Chesterfield
Party	Candidate	Votes	%	±%
Liberal	Barnet Kenyon	Unopposed		
Liberal hold				

Derbyshire, Clay Cross
Party	Candidate	Votes	%	±%
Labour	Charles Duncan	13,206	57.9	+12.0
Liberal	Charles Masterman	6,294	27.6	n/a
National Liberal	Thomas Broad	3,294	14.5	−39.6
Majority		6,912	30.3	n/a
Turnout		22,794	72.1	+21.5
Labour gain from Liberal		Swing	+25.8	

Derbyshire, High Peak
Party	Candidate	Votes	%	±%
Unionist	Samuel Hill-Wood	14,892	52.5	−6.3
Labour	Frank Anderson	7,698	27.1	n/a
Liberal	Anna Heywood	5,802	20.4	−20.8
Majority		7,194	25.4	+7.8
Turnout		28,392	82.9	+20.6
Unionist hold		Swing	+7.3	

Derbyshire, Ilkeston
Party	Candidate	Votes	%	±%
Labour	George Oliver	9,432	40.0	−5.2
National Liberal	J. E. B. Seely	8,348	35.3	−19.6
Unionist	William Marshall Freeman	5,841	24.7	n/a
Majority		1,084	4.7	14.2
Turnout			76.8	+15.8
Labour gain from Liberal		Swing	+7.1	

Derbyshire, North East
Party	Candidate	Votes	%	±%
Labour	Frank Lee	9,359	33.9	+5.3
Liberal	Joseph Stanley Holmes	9,344	33.9	+2.5
Unionist	Charles Waterhouse	8,877	32.2	n/a
Majority		15	0.0	2.8
Turnout			77.3	+19.3
Labour gain from Liberal		Swing	+1.4	

Derbyshire, South
Party	Candidate	Votes	%	±%
Unionist	Henry Lorimer	14,664	42.6	n/a
Labour	Samuel Truman	10,201	29.6	−4.2
National Liberal	Goronwy Owen	9,585	27.8	−38.4
Majority		4,463	13.0	n/a
Turnout		34,450	79.8	+21.4
Unionist gain from Liberal		Swing	n/a	

White

Derbyshire, West
Party	Candidate	Votes	%	±%
Liberal	Charles Frederick White	13,060	50.2	−5.4
Unionist	Edward Cavendish	12,973	49.8	+5.4
Majority		87	0.4	−10.8
Turnout		26,033	86.1	+20.1
Liberal hold		Swing	−5.4	

Devon, Barnstaple
Party	Candidate	Votes	%	±%
Unionist	Basil Peto	13,793	50.3	+1.7
Liberal	Tudor Rees	13,619	49.7	−1.7
Majority		174	0.6	3.4
Turnout			83.1	+14.0
Unionist gain from Liberal		Swing	+1.7	

Devon, Honiton
Party	Candidate	Votes	%	±%
Unionist	Clive Morrison-Bell	12,972	55.5	n/a
Liberal	John George Hawkins Halse	10,404	44.5	n/a
Majority		2,568	11.0	n/a
Turnout		23,376	79.1	n/a
Unionist hold		Swing	n/a	

Lambert

Devon, South Molton
Party	Candidate	Votes	%	±%
Liberal	George Lambert	unopposed	n/a	n/a
Liberal hold		Swing	n/a	

Thornton

Devon, Tavistock
Party	Candidate	Votes	%	±%
Liberal	Maxwell Ruthven Thornton	11,708	54.5	+11.2
Unionist	Charles Williams	9,757	45.5	−11.2
Majority		1,951	9.0	22.4
Turnout			77.6	+15.4
Liberal gain from Unionist		Swing	+11.2	

Devon, Tiverton
Party	Candidate	Votes	%	±%
Unionist	Herbert Sparkes	10,304	46.9	−10.3
Liberal	Francis Dyke Acland	10,230	46.5	+17.8
Labour	Frederick Brown	1,457	6.6	−7.5
Majority		74	0.4	−28.1
Turnout			80.1	+5.3
Unionist hold		Swing	-14.0	

Devon, Torquay
Party	Candidate	Votes	%	±%
Unionist	Charles Burn	14,676	52.2	−14.0
Liberal	Piers Gilchrist Thompson	13,425	47.8	+32.9
Majority		1,251	4.4	−42.9
Turnout			78.5	+13.2
Unionist hold		Swing	-23.5	

Devon, Totnes
Party	Candidate	Votes	%	±%
Unionist	Samuel Harvey	16,532	52.4	−6.4
Liberal	Thomas Henry Johnson Underdown	15,032	47.6	+6.4
Majority		1,500	4.8	−12.8
Turnout			78.1	
Unionist hold		Swing	-6.4	

Dorset, East
Party	Candidate	Votes	%	±%
Ind. Unionist	Gordon Hall Caine	12,513	49.1	n/a
Labour	Frederick Jesse Hopkins	6,914	27.1	+0.5
National Liberal	Frederick Guest	6,062	23.8	−49.6
Majority		5,599	22.0	n/a
Turnout		25,489	80.2	+26.0
Ind. Unionist gain from National Liberal		Swing	n/a	

Emlyn-Jones

Dorset, North
Party	Candidate	Votes	%	±%
Liberal	John Emlyn-Jones	10,805	52.3	+3.0
Unionist	Cecil Hanbury	9,869	47.7	−3.0
Majority		936	4.6	n/a
Turnout		20,674	84.2	+23.2
Liberal gain from Unionist		Swing	+3.0	

Dorset, South
Party	Candidate	Votes	%	±%
Unionist	Robert Yerburgh	12,121	57.2	−11.2
Liberal	Frederick Maddison	4,657	22.0	n/a
Labour	Henry Pavely	4,394	20.8	−10.8
Majority		7,464	35.2	−1.6
Turnout		21,172	75.2	+17.3
Unionist hold		Swing	−0.2	

Dorset, West
Party	Candidate	Votes	%	±%
Unionist	Philip Colfox	11,649	62.1	n/a
Labour	Thomas C. Duke	7,101	37.9	n/a
Majority		4,548	24.2	n/a
Turnout			78.5	n/a
Unionist hold		Swing	n/a	

Durham, Barnard Castle
Party	Candidate	Votes	%	±%
Unionist	John Rogerson	8,271	50.7	+20.6
Labour	John Swan	8,052	49.3	+6.47
Majority		219	1.3	n/a
Turnout		16,323	78.5	+14.55
Unionist gain from Labour		Swing	+7.1	

Durham, Bishop Auckland
Party	Candidate	Votes	%	±%
Labour	Ben Spoor	13,946	53.7	+3.1
National Liberal	Egbert Atherley-Jones	12,019	46.3	n/a
Majority		1,927	7.4	−5.9
Turnout		25,965	74.8	+14.0
Labour hold		Swing	n/a	

Durham, Blaydon
Party	Candidate	Votes	%	±%
Labour	William Whiteley	14,722	53.9	+12.3
Unionist	Frank Simpson	7,963	29.2	n/a
National Liberal	Frederick William Cook	4,606	16.9	n/a
Majority		6,759	24.7	n/a
Turnout		27,291	77.0	+19.6
Labour gain from National Liberal		Swing	n/a	

Durham, Chester-le-Street
Party	Candidate	Votes	%	±%
Labour	Jack Lawson	20,296	68.5	n/a
Unionist	D.F. Todd	9,335	31.5	n/a
Majority		10,961	37.0	n/a
Turnout		29,631	76.6	n/a
Labour hold		Swing	n/a	

Durham, Consett
Party	Candidate	Votes	%	±%
Labour	Herbert Dunnico	14,469	46.5	+13.7
Liberal	Aneurin Williams	9,870	31.8	−2.5
Unionist	Sydney Erskine Dare Wilson	6,745	21.7	n/a
Majority		4,599	14.7	n/a
Turnout		31,084	82.0	+17.7
Labour gain from Liberal		Swing	+8.1	

Durham, City of Durham
Party	Candidate	Votes	%	±%
Labour	Joshua Ritson	14,068	55.2	+5.8
Unionist	John Waller Hills	11,396	44.8	−5.8
Majority		2,672	10.4	n/a
Turnout		25,464	81.9	+20.5
Labour gain from Unionist		Swing	+1.8	

Durham, Houghton-le-Spring
Party	Candidate	Votes	%	±%
Labour	Robert Richardson	14,611	51.9	+15.5
Unionist	Walter William Shaw	7,555	26.9	n/a
Liberal	John Edward Johnston	5,958	21.2	−11.7
Majority		7,056	25.0	+21.5
Turnout		28,124	78.4	+16.6
Labour hold		Swing	+13.6	

Durham, Jarrow
Party	Candidate	Votes	%	±%
Labour	Robert John Wilson	17,208	53.9	+14.9
Unionist	Charles Harrie Innes-Hopkins	10,166	31.9	n/a
Liberal	Ernest Young	4,522	14.2	−46.8
Majority		7,042	22.0	n/a
Turnout		31,896	82.2	+27.2
Labour gain from Liberal		Swing	+30.9	

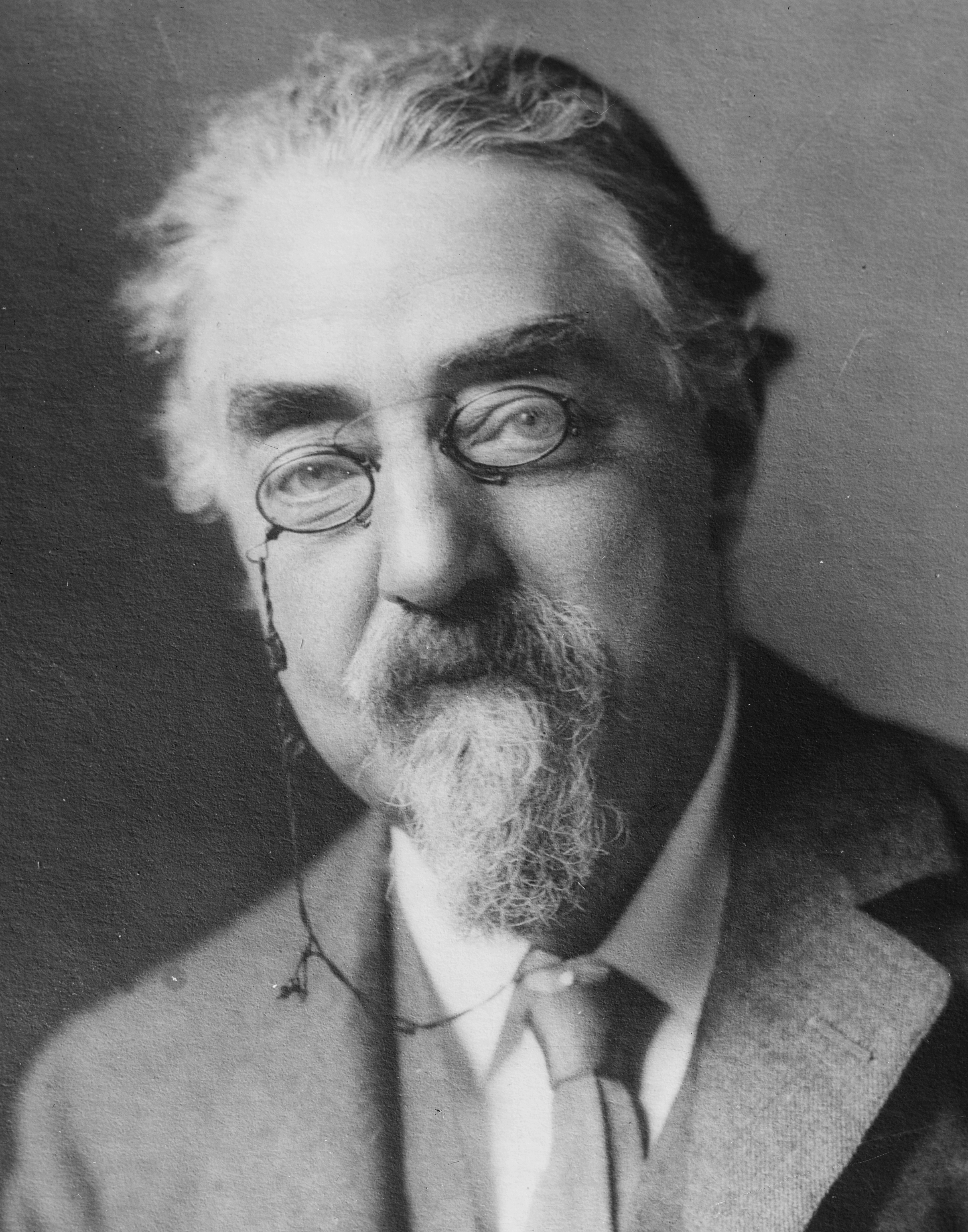
Webb

Durham, Seaham
Party	Candidate	Votes	%	±%
Labour	Sidney Webb	20,203	59.9	+18.6
Unionist	Thomas Andrews Bradford	8,315	24.6	n/a
Liberal	Evan Hayward	5,247	15.5	−43.2
Majority		11,888	35.3	61.8
Turnout			81.9	+22.7
Labour gain from Liberal		Swing	n/a	

Durham, Sedgefield
Party	Candidate	Votes	%	±%
Labour	John Herriotts	9,756	43.6	+6.8
Unionist	Eli Waddington	9,067	40.5	−1.6
Liberal	Charles Henry Brown	3,561	15.9	−5.2
Majority		689	3.1	8.4
Turnout			76.1	+12.7
Labour gain from Unionist		Swing	+4.2	

Durham, Spennymoor
Party	Candidate	Votes	%	±%
Labour	Joseph Batey	13,766	50.3	+3.8
Unionist	Anthony Eden	7,567	27.6	n/a
Liberal	Thomas Wing	6,046	22.1	−31.4
Majority		6,199	22.7	n/a
Turnout		27,379	81.2	+25.4
Labour gain from Liberal		Swing	+17.6	

Essex, Chelmsford
Party	Candidate	Votes	%	±%
Unionist	E. G. Pretyman	11,267	52.6	−14.3
Liberal	Sydney Walter Robinson	6,380	29.8	n/a
Labour	Clara Rackham	3,767	17.6	−15.5
Majority		4,887	22.8	−11.0
Turnout			61.0	+10.8
Unionist hold		Swing	n/a	

Evans

Essex, Colchester
Party	Candidate	Votes	%	±%
Unionist	Laming Worthington-Evans	13,142	56.7	−4.4
Labour	Richard Leopold Reiss	10,045	43.3	+4.4
Majority		3,097	13.4	−8.8
Turnout		23,187	77.9	+17.7
Unionist hold		Swing	−4.4	

Essex, Epping
Party	Candidate	Votes	%	±%
Unionist	Richard Colvin	15,300	59.9	−12.7
Liberal	Gilbert Granville Sharp	10,228	40.1	+19.5
Majority		5,072	19.8	−32.8
Turnout		25,528	63.5	+11.1
Unionist hold		Swing	−16.1	

Essex, Harwich
Party	Candidate	Votes	%	±%
Liberal	Albert Ernest Hillary	10,556	51.9	+5.8
Unionist	Geoffrey Strutt	9,792	48.1	−5.8
Majority		764	3.8	N/A
Turnout		20,348	71.6	+15.7
Liberal gain from Unionist		Swing	+5.8	

Essex, Maldon
Party	Candidate	Votes	%	±%
Unionist	Edward Ruggles-Brise	10,337	47.2	−3.9
Labour	George Dallas	6,085	27.8	−11.8
Liberal	James Parish	5,470	25.0	+15.7
Majority		4,252	19.4	+7.9
Turnout		21,892	74.8	+18.1
Unionist hold		Swing		

Essex, Romford
Party	Candidate	Votes	%	±%
National Liberal	Albert Edward Martin	14,070	58.5	+1.0
Labour	Albert Enil Davies	9,967	41.5	+13.4
Majority		4,103	17.0	−12.4
Turnout		24,037	59.2	+10.8
National Liberal gain from Liberal		Swing	N/A	

Essex, Saffron Walden
Party	Candidate	Votes	%	±%
Unionist	William Foot Mitchell	9,844	43.6	n/a
Labour	William Cash	6,797	30.1	+0.2
National Liberal	William Dawson Harbinson	3,097	13.7	n/a
Liberal	Robert McNair Wilson	2,853	12.6	n/a
Majority		3,047	13.5	n/a
Turnout			71.1	+23.3
Unionist gain from Liberal		Swing		

Essex, South East
Party	Candidate	Votes	%	±%
Unionist	Frank Hilder	13,522	54.1	−9.5
Labour	Philip Hoffman	11,459	45.9	+16.9
Majority		2,063	8.2	−26.4
Turnout		24,981	58.9	+8.0
Unionist hold		Swing	−13.2	

Gloucestershire, Cirencester and Tewkesbury
Party	Candidate	Votes	%	±%
Unionist	Thomas Davies	16,463	64.2	+7.5
Labour	William Robert Robins	9,195	35.8	n/a
Majority		7,268	28.3	+15.0
Turnout		25,658	71.3	+15.0
Unionist hold		Swing	n/a	

Gloucestershire, Forest of Dean
Party	Candidate	Votes	%	±%
Labour	James Wignall	10,820	52.4	−10.4
Ind. Unionist	Augustus George Cuthbert Dinnick	5,976	28.9	n/a
National Liberal	Winifred Coombe Tennant	3,861	18.7	n/a
Majority		4,854	23.5	−2.1
Turnout		20,647	72.0	+15.9
Labour hold		Swing	n/a	

Gloucestershire, Stroud
Party	Candidate	Votes	%	±%
Unionist	Stanley Tubbs	14,723	51.0	n/a
Liberal	Charles Allen	9,041	31.3	−28.6
Labour	Samuel Edward Walters	5,081	17.6	−22.5
Majority		5,682	19.7	−0.1
Turnout		28845	79.9	+18.6
Unionist gain from Liberal		Swing	n/a	

Gloucestershire, Thornbury
Party	Candidate	Votes	%	±%
Unionist	Herbert Charles Woodcock	10,682	39.5	n/a
Liberal	Athelstan Rendall	10,578	39.2	−22.8
Labour	Joseph Alpass	5,749	21.3	n/a
Majority		104	0.4	−23.6
Turnout		27,009	77.9	+30.3
Unionist gain from Liberal		Swing	n/a	

Hampshire, Aldershot
Party	Candidate	Votes	%	±%
Unionist	Roundell Palmer	10,952	67.4	−5.0
Liberal	Harry Ainger	5,296	32.6	+5.0
Majority		5,656	34.8	−10.0
Turnout			64.8	+16.8
Unionist hold		Swing	-5.0	

Hampshire, Basingstoke
Party	Candidate	Votes	%	±%
Unionist	Arthur Richard Holbrook	12,514	56.0	+21.8
Liberal	Reginald Fletcher	6,780	30.4	+2.4
Labour	Samuel Ledbury	3,035	13.6	−14.2
Majority		5,734	25.6	+10.4
Turnout			66.9	+6.9
Unionist hold		Swing	+9.7	

Hampshire, Fareham
Party	Candidate	Votes	%	±%
Unionist	John Humphrey Davidson	17,008	73.1	n/a
Labour	Charles Hervey Hoare	6,245	26.9	n/a
Majority		10,763	46.2	n/a
Turnout			67.4	n/a
Unionist hold		Swing	n/a	

Hampshire, New Forest and Christchurch
Party	Candidate	Votes	%	±%
Unionist	Wilfrid Ashley	unopposed	n/a	n/a
Unionist hold		Swing	n/a	

Hampshire, Petersfield
Party	Candidate	Votes	%	±%
Unionist	William Graham Nicholson	12,600	64.2	−7.3
Labour	Dudley Aman	7,036	35.8	+7.3
Majority		5,564	28.4	−14.6
Turnout			65.7	+13.0
Unionist hold		Swing	-7.3	

Hampshire, Winchester
Party	Candidate	Votes	%	±%
Unionist	George Hennessy	14,173	65.3	+0.7
Labour	Alexander Haycock	7,535	34.7	n/a
Majority		6,638	30.6	+1.4
Turnout			63.8	+15.7
Unionist hold		Swing	n/a	

Herefordshire, Hereford
Party	Candidate	Votes	%	±%
Unionist	Samuel Roberts	13,138	76.2	+0.4
Labour	James Jonas Dodd	4,094	23.8	−0.4
Majority		9,044	52.4	+0.8
Turnout		17,232	62.0	+7.4
Unionist hold		Swing	+0.4	

Herefordshire, Leominster
Party	Candidate	Votes	%	±%
Unionist	Ernest Shepperson	10,978	53.1	+2.6
Liberal	Geoffrey Mander	9,698	46.9	+14.8
Majority		1,280	6.2	−12.2
Turnout		20,676	79.0	+16.1
Unionist hold		Swing	−6.1	

Hertfordshire, Hemel Hempstead
Party	Candidate	Votes	%	±%
Unionist	J. C. C. Davidson	11,847	67.4	−10.2
Labour	John Harper Clynes	5,726	32.6	+10.2
Majority		6,121	34.8	−20.4
Turnout		17,573	66.0	+15.6
Unionist hold		Swing	−10.2	

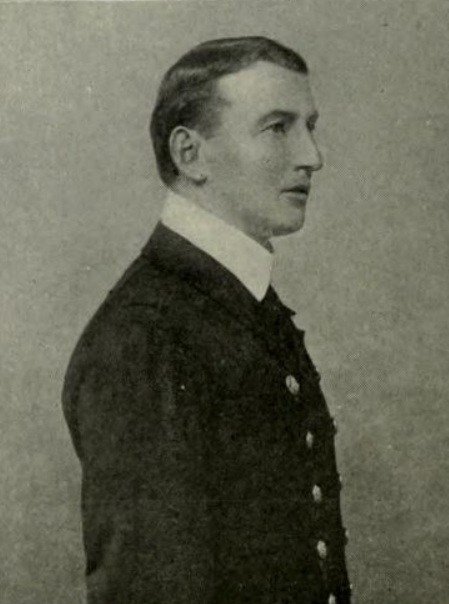
Sueter

Hertfordshire, Hertford
Party	Candidate	Votes	%	±%
Unionist	Murray Sueter	11,406	63.6	n/a
Liberal	Thomas Greenwood	6,534	36.4	n/a
Majority		4,872	27.2	n/a
Turnout		17,940	54.1	−3.3
Unionist gain from Independent		Swing	n/a	

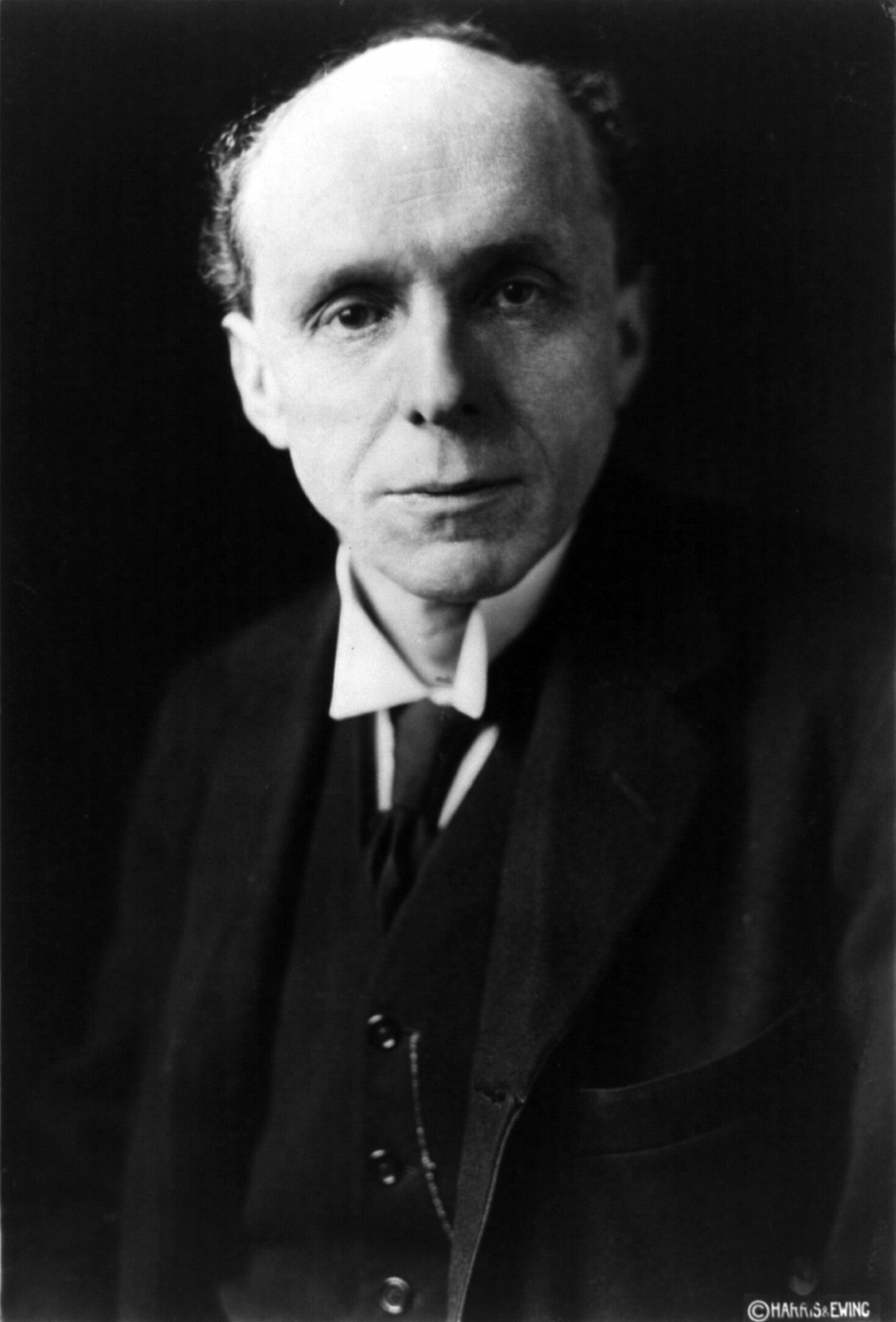
Cecil

Hertfordshire, Hitchin
Party	Candidate	Votes	%	±%
Unionist	Robert Cecil	13,124	62.0	+1.4
Labour	Benjamin Skene Mackay	8,049	38.0	+3.1
Majority		5,075	24.0	−1.7
Turnout		21,173	66.2	+7.8
Unionist hold		Swing	−0.9	

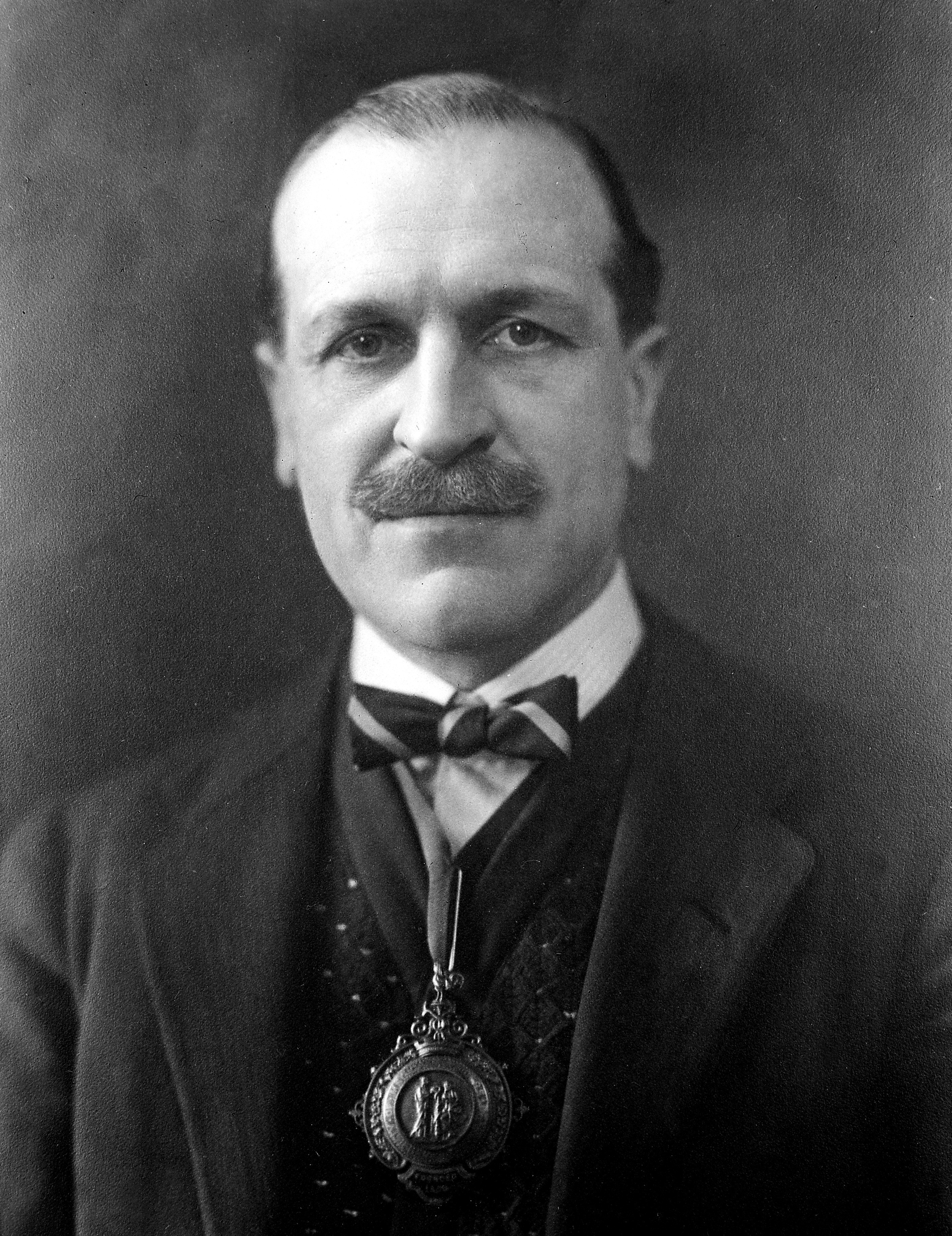
Fremantle

Hertfordshire, St Albans
Party	Candidate	Votes	%	±%
Unionist	Francis Fremantle	14,594	57.8	+12.0
Labour	John William Brown	10,662	42.2	−0.2
Majority		3,932	15.6	+12.2
Turnout		25,256	71.1	+8.3
Unionist hold		Swing	+6.1	

Hertfordshire, Watford
Party	Candidate	Votes	%	±%
Unionist	Dennis Herbert	12,040	49.2	−8.0
Labour	James Joseph Mallon	8,561	34.9	+9.5
Liberal	Robert Allen Bateman	3,896	15.9	−1.5
Majority		3,479	14.3	
Turnout			69.0	
Unionist hold		Swing	-8.7	

Huntingdonshire
Party	Candidate	Votes	%	±%
Unionist	Charles Murchison	10,079	50.7	−11.9
Liberal	Lina Scott Gatty	5,123	25.7	−11.7
Labour	Dermot Johnston Freyer	4,697	23.6	n/a
Majority		4,956	25.0	−0.2
Turnout		19,899	70.7	+7.9
Unionist hold		Swing	−0.1	

Isle of Ely
Party	Candidate	Votes	%	±%
Unionist	Norman Coates	13,552	50.9	n/a
National Liberal	Colin Coote	7,359	27.7	n/a
Labour	William George Hall	5,688	21.4	n/a
Majority		6,193	23.2	n/a
Turnout		26,599	72.0	n/a
Unionist gain from National Liberal		Swing	n/a	

Isle of Wight
Party	Candidate	Votes	%	±%
Liberal	Edgar Chatfeild-Clarke	12,202	36.2	−4.6
Unionist	John Perowne	10,620	31.6	−27.6
Ind. Unionist	Arthur Veasey	7,061	21.0	n/a
Labour	Harold Shearman	3,756	11.2	n/a
Majority		1,582	4.6	n/a
Turnout		33,639	75.4	+9.9
Liberal gain from Unionist		Swing	+11.5	

== Scotland ==
Aberdeen North
Party	Candidate	Votes	%	±%
Labour	Frank Herbert Rose	10,958	55.7	
National Liberal	William Mackenzie Cameron	6,615	33.6	n/a
Liberal	James Johnstone	2,113	10.7	
Majority		4,343	22.1	
Turnout		19,686		
Labour hold		Swing		

Aberdeen South
Party	Candidate	Votes	%	±%
Unionist	Frederick Thomson	13,208	58.0	−4.4
Liberal	Charles Mallet	9,573	42.0	+21.2
Majority		3,635	16.0	−25.6
Turnout			57.5	
Unionist hold		Swing	-12.8	

Aberdeen and Kincardine Central
Party	Candidate	Votes	%	±%
Liberal	Murdoch McKenzie Wood	9,779	60.1	+22.6
Unionist	Robert Smith	6,481	39.9	+3.8
Majority		3,298	20.2	+18.8
Turnout		16,260	56.9	+6.8
Liberal hold		Swing	+9.4	

Martin

Aberdeen and Kincardine East
Party	Candidate	Votes	%	±%
Liberal	Frederick Martin	8,018	60.5	n/a
National Liberal	Henry Cowan	5,227	39.5	n/a
Majority		2,791	21.0	22.0
Turnout		13,245	45.5	
Liberal gain from National Liberal		Swing	n/a	

Murray

Kincardine & Western Aberdeenshire
Party	Candidate	Votes	%	±%
Liberal	Arthur Murray	6,224	62.3	n/a
National Liberal	William Mitchell	3,767	37.7	n/a
Majority		2,457	24.6	n/a
Turnout			44.6	n/a
Liberal hold		Swing	n/a	

Sutherland

Argyllshire
Party	Candidate	Votes	%	±%
National Liberal	William Sutherland	9,848	58.8	n/a
Liberal	Henry Anderson Watt	6,897	41.2	n/a
Majority		2,591	15.5	−67.3
Turnout		16,745	51.8	−0.2
National Liberal hold		Swing	n/a	

Ayr Burghs
Party	Candidate	Votes	%	±%
Unionist	John Baird	11,179	44.5	−4.6
Liberal	Peter Raffan	7,402	29.5	+1.8
Labour	John McDiarmid Airlie	6,533	26.0	+2.8
Majority		3,777	15.0	−6.4
Turnout			71.1	+8.9
Unionist hold		Swing	-3.2	

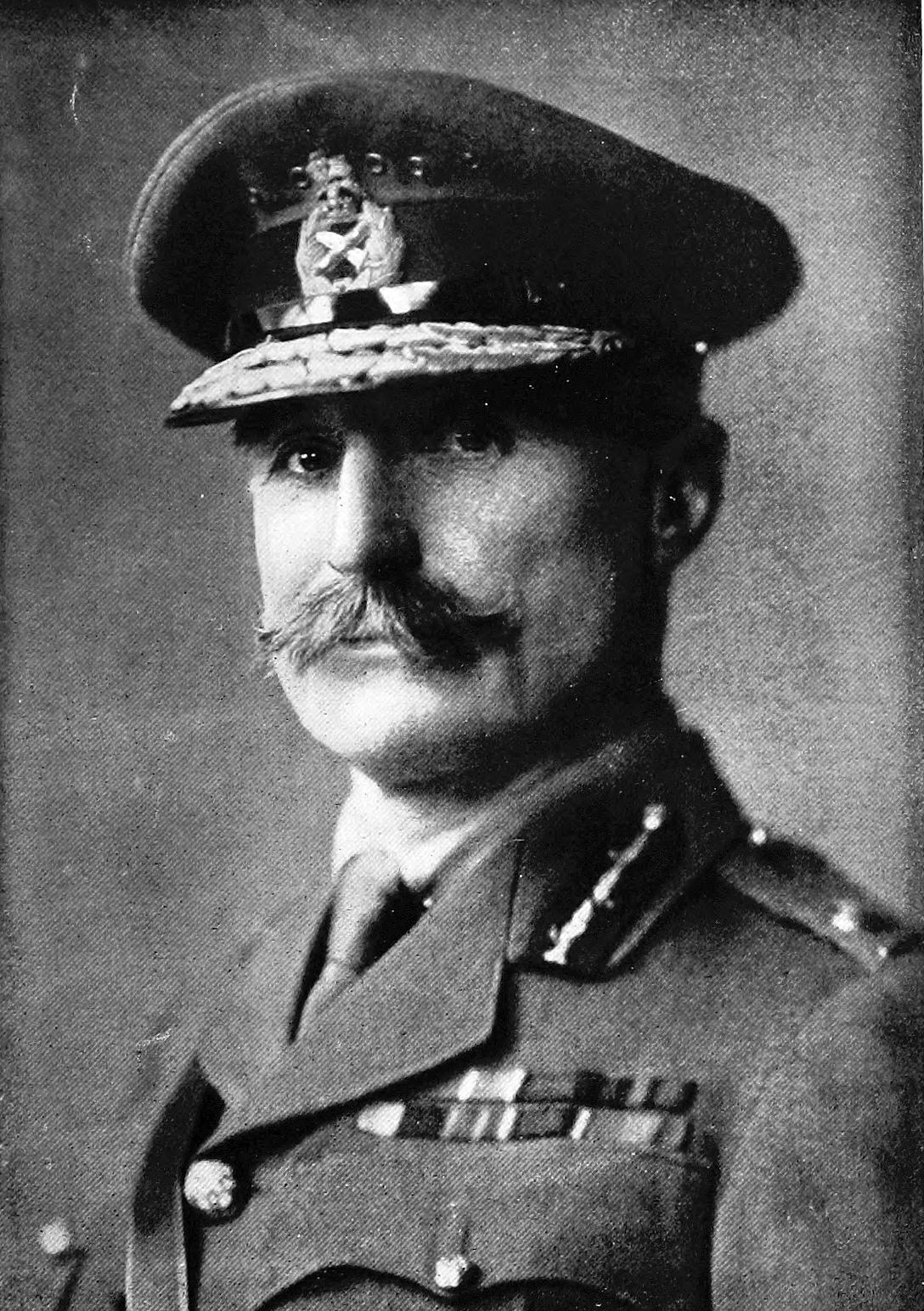
Hunter-Weston

Bute & Northern Ayrshire
Party	Candidate	Votes	%	±%
Unionist	Aylmer Hunter-Weston	14,368	60.6	
Labour	John Paton	9,323	39.4	
Majority		5,045	21.2	
Turnout		23,691		
Unionist hold		Swing		

Ayrshire South
Party	Candidate	Votes	%	±%
Labour	James Brown	11,511	55.6	+18.3
Unionist	William Reid	9,180	44.4	+12.2
Majority		2,331	11.2	+6.1
Turnout		20,691		
Labour hold		Swing	+3.0	

Barrie

Banffshire
Party	Candidate	Votes	%	±%
National Liberal	Charles Barrie	unopposed	n/a	n/a
National Liberal hold		Swing	n/a	

Waring

Berwick and Haddington
Party	Candidate	Votes	%	±%
National Liberal	Walter Waring	6,342	31.9	n/a
Labour	Robert Spence	5,842	29.3	
Liberal	William Henderson Pringle	4,422	22.2	
Independent Liberal	John Deans Hope	3,300	16.6	n/a
Majority		500	2.6	
Turnout		19,906		
National Liberal hold		Swing	n/a	

Bothwell
Party	Candidate	Votes	%	±%
Labour	John Robertson	13,872	57.0	
Unionist	Peter Denniston Ridge-Beedle	10,484	43.0	
Majority		3,388	14.0	
Turnout			78.2	
Labour hold		Swing		

Caithness and Sutherland
Party	Candidate	Votes	%	±%
National Liberal	Archibald Sinclair	7,715	57.1	
Liberal	Leicester Harmsworth	5,803	42.9	
Majority		1,912	14.2	
Turnout			60.1	
National Liberal hold		Swing		

Clackmannan and Eastern Stirlingshire
Party	Candidate	Votes	%	±%
Labour	Lauchlin MacNeill Weir	10,312	42.0	
Liberal	Craigie Aitchison	7,379	30.0	
Unionist	Ralph Glyn	6,888	28.0	
Majority		2,933	12.0	
Turnout		24,579		
Labour gain from Unionist		Swing		

Coatbridge
Party	Candidate	Votes	%	±%
Labour	James C. Welsh	12,038	49.0	
Unionist	Arthur Louis Hamilton Buchanan	9,724	39.6	
Liberal	Daniel Blades	2,802	11.4	
Majority		2,314	9.4	
Turnout		24,564		
Labour gain from Unionist		Swing		

Dumbarton Burghs
Party	Candidate	Votes	%	±%
Labour	David Kirkwood	16,397	64.5	
National Liberal	John Taylor	9,017	35.5	
Majority		7,380	29.0	
Turnout		25,414		
Labour hold		Swing		

Dumfriesshire
Party	Candidate	Votes	%	±%
Liberal	William Chapple	13,296	54.6	
Unionist	Henry Keswick	11,055	45.4	
Majority		2,241	9.2	
Turnout		24,351		
Liberal gain from Unionist		Swing		

Edinburgh Central
Party	Candidate	Votes	%	±%
Labour	William Graham	12,876	57.9	+6.6
National Liberal	George McCrae	9,371	42.1	−6.6
Majority		3,505	15.8	+13.2
Turnout			71.8	
Labour hold		Swing	+6.6	

Edinburgh East
Party	Candidate	Votes	%	±%
Liberal	James Myles Hogge	10,551	59.8	−2.4
National Liberal	Sam McDonald	7,088	40.2	+2.4
Majority		3,463	19.6	−4.8
Turnout		17,639	66.0	+13.5
Liberal hold		Swing	-2.4	

Edinburgh North
Party	Candidate	Votes	%	±%
Unionist	Patrick Ford	14,805	61.8	−1.2
Liberal	P.H. Allan	9,165	38.2	+1.2
Majority		5,640	23.6	−2.4
Turnout		23,970		
Unionist hold		Swing	-1.2	

Edinburgh South
Party	Candidate	Votes	%	±%
Unionist	Samuel Chapman	14,843	67.7	
National Liberal	Catherine Alderton	7,408	33.3	
Majority		7,435	35.4	
Turnout		22,251		
Unionist hold		Swing		

Phillipps

Edinburgh West
Party	Candidate	Votes	%	±%
Liberal	Vivian Phillipps	12,355	51.4	+16.9
Unionist	John Gordon Jameson	11,689	48.6	−2.2
Majority		666	2.8	19.1
Turnout			68.9	+15.6
Liberal gain from Unionist		Swing	+9.6	

Millar

East Fife
Party	Candidate	Votes	%	±%
Liberal	James Duncan Millar	12,697	56.0	+13.8
Unionist	Alexander Sprot	9,987	44.0	−10.2
Majority		2,710	12.0	24.0
Turnout		22,684	67.2	+13.2
Liberal gain from Unionist		Swing	+12.0	

Fife West
Party	Candidate	Votes	%	±%
Labour	William Adamson	unopposed	n/a	n/a
Labour hold		Swing	n/a	

Forfar
Party	Candidate	Votes	%	±%
Liberal	James Falconer	8,567	54.8	+7.2
Unionist	William T. Shaw	7,071	45.2	−7.2
Majority		1,396	9.6	14.4
Turnout			65.0	+20.8
Liberal gain from Unionist		Swing	+7.2	

Galloway
Party	Candidate	Votes	%	±%
Liberal	Cecil Dudgeon	12,406	54.0	N/A
Unionist	William Watson	10,557	46.0	N/A
Majority		1,849	8.0	N/A
Turnout			77.5	N/A
Liberal hold		Swing	N/A	

Glasgow Bridgeton
Party	Candidate	Votes	%	±%
Labour	James Maxton	17,890	63.7	
National Liberal	Alexander MacCallum Scott	10,198	36.3	
Majority		7,692	27.4	
Turnout		28,088		
Labour gain from National Liberal		Swing		

Glasgow Camlachie
Party	Candidate	Votes	%	±%
Labour	Campbell Stephen	15,181	53.2	
Unionist	Halford Mackinder	11,439	40.1	
Liberal	Walter Crawford Smith	1,896	6.6	
Majority		3,742	13.1	
Turnout		28,516		
Labour gain from Unionist		Swing		

Glasgow Cathcart
Party	Candidate	Votes	%	±%
Labour	John Primrose Hay	9,137	34.0	+12.4
National Liberal	Andrew Rae Duncan	9,104	33.8	n/a
Unionist	Robert MacDonald	8,661	32.2	n/a
Majority		33	0.2	57.0
Turnout		26,902		
Labour gain from Liberal		Swing	n/a	

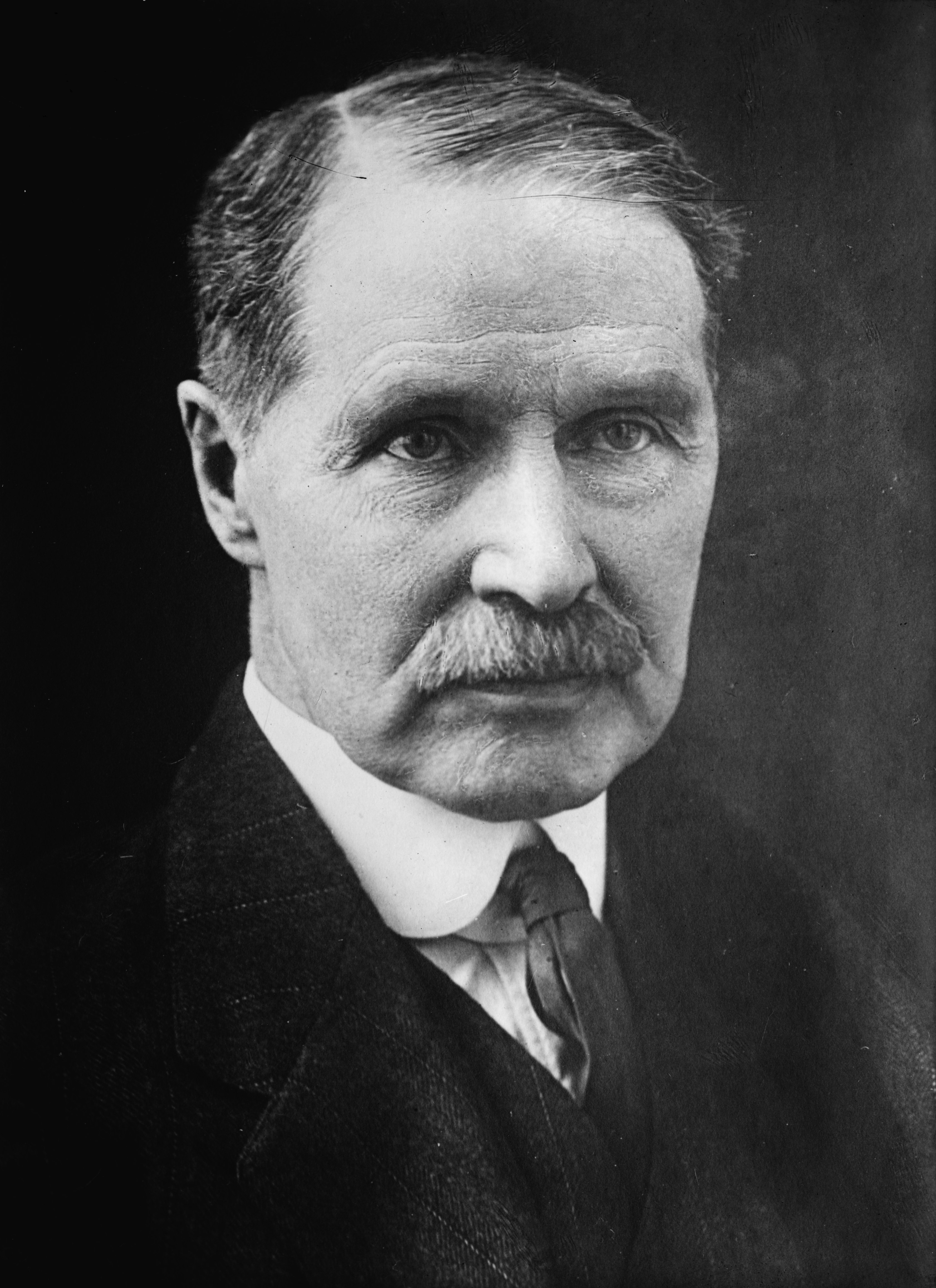
Law

Glasgow Central
Party	Candidate	Votes	%	±%
Unionist	Bonar Law	15,437	49.9	−28.9
Labour	Edward Mitchell	12,923	41.9	+20.7
Liberal	George Paish	2,518	8.2	n/a
Majority		2,514	8.0	−49.6
Turnout			71.2	+18.3
Unionist hold		Swing	-24.8	

Glasgow Gorbals
Party	Candidate	Votes	%	±%
Labour	George Buchanan	16,478	54.5	
National Liberal	James Erskine Harper	8,276	27.4	n/a
Independent Communist	John Maclean	4,027	13.3	
Liberal	Francis John Robertson	1,456	4.8	n/a
Majority		8,202	27.1	
Turnout		30,237		
Labour gain from Coalition Labour		Swing		

Glasgow Govan
Party	Candidate	Votes	%	±%
Labour	Neil Maclean	15,441	62.3	+14.5
National Liberal	Helen Fraser	9,336	37.7	+29.3
Majority		6,105	24.6	+20.6
Turnout		24,777	78.3	
Labour hold		Swing	-7.4	

Glasgow Hillhead
Party	Candidate	Votes	%	±%
Unionist	Robert Horne	12,272	62.7	−12.7
Liberal	Edwin James Donaldson	7,313	37.3	n/a
Majority		4,959	25.4	−25.4
Turnout			75.5	+12.1
Unionist hold		Swing	n/a	

Glasgow Kelvingrove
Party	Candidate	Votes	%	±%
Unionist	William Hutchison	13,442	54.8	−9.4
Liberal	Robert Roxburgh	11,094	45.2	+33.0
Majority		2,348	9.6	−31.0
Turnout			64.5	+11.0
Unionist hold		Swing	-15.5	

Glasgow Maryhill
Party	Candidate	Votes	%	±%
Labour	John William Muir	13,058	47.3	
Unionist	William Mitchell-Thomson	10,951	39.6	
Liberal	Annie S. Swan	3,617	13.1	
Majority		2,107	7.7	45.3
Turnout				
Labour gain from Unionist		Swing		

Collie

Glasgow Partick
Party	Candidate	Votes	%	±%
National Liberal	Robert John Collie	11,754	65.2	n/a
Liberal	Daniel Macaulay Stevenson	6,282	34.8	n/a
Majority		5,472	30.4	
Turnout		18,036		
National Liberal hold		Swing	n/a	

Glasgow Pollok
Party	Candidate	Votes	%	±%
Unionist	John Gilmour	14,920	63.9	n/a
Labour	Alexander Burns Mackay	5,759	24.7	n/a
Liberal	Thomas Randall Anderson	2,658	11.4	n/a
Majority		9,161	39.2	n/a
Turnout		23,337		n/a
Unionist hold		Swing	n/a	

Glasgow St Rollox
Party	Candidate	Votes	%	±%
Labour	James Stewart	16,114	56.6	
Unionist	James Couper	10,343	36.3	
Liberal	James Alexander Fleming	2,025	7.1	
Majority		5,771	20.3	
Turnout		28,482		
Labour gain from Unionist		Swing		

Glasgow Shettleston
Party	Candidate	Votes	%	±%
Labour	John Wheatley	14,695	59.1	
National Liberal	Thomas Ramsay	9,704	39.0	
Anti-Parliamentary Communist	Guy Aldred	470	1.9	
Majority		4,991	20.1	
Turnout		24,869		
Labour hold		Swing		

Glasgow Springburn
Party	Candidate	Votes	%	±%
Labour	George Hardie	15,771	60.5	+21.4
Unionist	Frederick Alexander Macquisten	10,311	39.5	−13.2
Majority		5,460	21.0	34.6
Turnout		26,082	78.5	+17.6
Labour gain from Unionist		Swing	+17.3	

Glasgow Tradeston
Party	Candidate	Votes	%	±%
Labour	Thomas Henderson	14,190	55.7	
Unionist	Vivian Henderson	9,977	39.2	
Liberal	Charles de Bois Murray	1,310	5.1	
Majority		4,213	16.5	
Turnout		25,477		
Labour gain from Unionist		Swing		

Collins

Greenock
Party	Candidate	Votes	%	±%
National Liberal	Godfrey Collins	10,520	36.6	−11.4
Communist	Alec Geddes	9,776	+22.9	n/a
Unionist	John Denholm	8,404	29.3	−2.5
Majority		744	2.5	−13.7
Turnout			84.8	+18.2
National Liberal hold		Swing	-17.1	

Hamilton
Party	Candidate	Votes	%	±%
Labour	Duncan Macgregor Graham	12,365	57.8	+15.7
Unionist	Henry Keith	9,089	42.4	+13.4
Majority		3,276	15.2	+2.3
Turnout			78.3	
Labour hold		Swing	+1.1	

Inverness
Party	Candidate	Votes	%	±%
National Liberal	Murdoch Macdonald	9,796	52.7	n/a
Liberal	Alexander Livingstone	8,785	47.3	n/a
Majority		1,011	5.4	n/a
Turnout		18,581		
National Liberal hold		Swing	n/a	

Shaw

Kilmarnock
Party	Candidate	Votes	%	±%
National Liberal	Alexander Shaw	12,991	54.7	−2.4
Labour	Robert Climie	10,752	45.3	+2.4
Majority		2,239	9.4	−4.8
Turnout			71.5	+8.9
National Liberal hold		Swing	-2.4	

Kinross and Western Perthshire
Party	Candidate	Votes	%	±%
National Liberal	James Gardiner	unopposed	n/a	n/a
National Liberal hold		Swing	n/a	

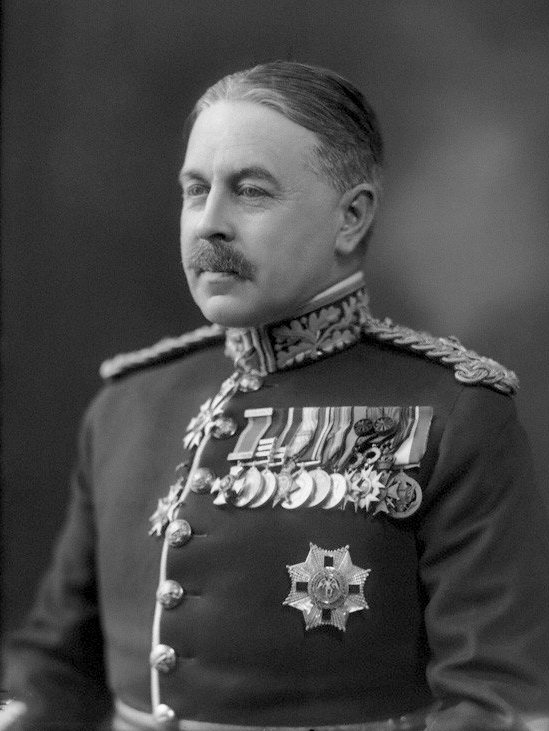
Hutchison

Kirkcaldy Burghs
Party	Candidate	Votes	%	±%
National Liberal	Robert Hutchison	12,762	51.4	n/a
Labour	Tom Kennedy	12,089	48.6	n/a
Majority		673	2.8	n/a
Turnout			79.3	n/a
National Liberal hold		Swing	n/a	

Lanark
Party	Candidate	Votes	%	±%
Unionist	Walter Elliot	12,005	55.0	
Labour	Thomas Scott Dickson	9,812	45.0	
Majority		2,193	10.0	
Turnout		21,817		
Unionist hold		Swing		

North Lanarkshire
Party	Candidate	Votes	%	±%
Labour	Joseph Sullivan	10,349	47.3	+13.2
Unionist	Robert McLaren	7,957	36.4	−6.7
Liberal	John Charles Carroll	3,569	16.3	−2.2
Majority		2,392	10.9	19.9
Turnout			72.1	+30.5
Labour gain from Unionist		Swing	+10.0	

Benn

Leith
Party	Candidate	Votes	%	±%
Liberal	William Wedgwood Benn	13,971	50.1	
Unionist	Alexander Munro MacRobert	7,372	26.4	
Labour	Robert Freeman Wilson	6,567	23.5	
Majority		6,599	23.7	
Turnout		27,910		
Liberal hold		Swing		

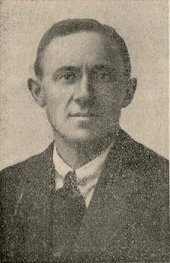
Shinwell

Linlithgowshire
Party	Candidate	Votes	%	±%
Labour	Manny Shinwell	12,625	46.4	
Unionist	James Kidd	8,993	33.0	
Liberal	John Fraser Orr	5,605	20.6	n/a
Majority		3,632	13.4	
Turnout		27,223		
Labour gain from Unionist		Swing		

Midlothian and Peebles Northern
Party	Candidate	Votes	%	±%
Unionist	George Hutchison	7,416	40.9	
Labour	Andrew Clarke	6,942	38.3	n/a
Liberal	Edward R. McNab	3,770	20.8	n/a
Majority		474	2.6	
Turnout		18,128		
Unionist hold		Swing		

Peebles and Southern Midlothian
Party	Candidate	Votes	%	±%
Labour	Joseph Westwood	6,394	36.0	−3.4
Unionist	Archibald Crawford	5,992	33.7	n/a
Liberal	Donald Maclean	5,337	30.3	−30.3
Majority		402	2.3	23.5
Turnout			75.7	+23.1
Labour gain from Liberal		Swing	n/a	

Montrose Burghs
Party	Candidate	Votes	%	±%
National Liberal	John Leng Sturrock	8,407	54.4	−21.6
Labour	John Carnegie	7,044	45.6	+21.6
Majority		1,363	8.8	−43.2
Turnout			62.7	+13.6
National Liberal hold		Swing	-21.6	

Moray & Nairn
Party	Candidate	Votes	%	±%
National Liberal	Thomas Maule Guthrie	6,263	51.8	n/a
Liberal	James Scott	5,832	48.2	n/a
Majority		431	3.6	n/a
Turnout		12,095	49.0	n/a
National Liberal hold		Swing	n/a	

Motherwell
Party	Candidate	Votes	%	±%
Communist	Walton Newbold	8,262	33.3	+10.1
Ind. Unionist	Hugh Ferguson	7,214	29.1	+18.3
Liberal	John Maxwell	5,359	21.6	−1.6
National Liberal	John Colville	3,966	16.0	n/a
Majority		1,048	10.2	21.6
Turnout			81.5	+17.3
Communist gain from Unionist		Swing	n/a	

Hamilton

Orkney and Shetland
Party	Candidate	Votes	%	±%
Liberal	Robert William Hamilton	4,814	53.5	n/a
National Liberal	Malcolm Smith	4,189	46.5	n/a
Majority		625	7.0	n/a
Turnout		9,003	37.4	n/a
Liberal hold		Swing	n/a	

Paisley
Party	Candidate	Votes	%	±%
Liberal	H H Asquith	15,005	50.5	+16.5
Labour	John Biggar	14,689	49.5	+16.0
Majority		316	1.0	+0.5
Turnout				
Liberal hold		Swing	+0.5	

Perth
Party	Candidate	Votes	%	±%
Unionist	Noel Skelton	11,387	46.3	n/a
Liberal	William Henderson	5,874	23.9	n/a
Labour	William Westwood	4,651	18.9	n/a
National Liberal	William Gourlay	2,689	10.9	n/a
Majority		5,513	22.4	n/a
Turnout			71.1	n/a
Unionist gain from National Liberal		Swing	n/a	

Renfrewshire East
Party	Candidate	Votes	%	±%
Labour	Robert Nichol	9,708	42.4	
Unionist	Frederick Lobnitz	9,158	40.0	
Liberal	Joseph Johnstone	4,013	17.5	
Majority		550	2.4	
Turnout		22,879		
Labour gain from Liberal		Swing		

Renfrewshire West
Party	Candidate	Votes	%	±%
Labour	Robert Murray	11,787	54.0	
National Liberal	James William Greig	10,051	46.0	
Majority		1,736	8.0	
Turnout		21,838		
Labour gain from National Liberal		Swing		

MacPherson

Ross and Cromarty
Party	Candidate	Votes	%	±%
National Liberal	Ian Macpherson	5,923	56.7	n/a
Liberal	John Macdonald	4,521	43.3	n/a
Majority		1,402	13.4	−44.4
Turnout			42.4	−8.8
National Liberal hold		Swing	n/a	

Roxburgh & Selkirk
Party	Candidate	Votes	%	±%
National Liberal	Thomas Henderson	10,356	51.7	
Liberal	Alfred Hamilton Grant	9,698	48.3	n/a
Majority		658	3.4	
Turnout		20,054	60.9	
National Liberal hold		Swing	n/a	

Rutherglen
Party	Candidate	Votes	%	±%
Labour	William Wright	14,029	55.1	
National Liberal	John Train	11,440	44.9	
Majority		2,589	10.2	
Turnout		25,469		
Labour gain from Liberal		Swing		

Stirling and Falkirk
Party	Candidate	Votes	%	±%
Labour	Hugh Murnin	11,073	53.3	+17.6
National Liberal	John Macdonald	9,717	46.7	−17.6
Turnout			71.7	+22.3
Majority		1,356	6.6	35.2
Labour gain from National Liberal		Swing	+17.6	

Clackmannan and Eastern Stirlingshire
Party	Candidate	Votes	%	±%
Labour	Lauchlin MacNeill Weir	10,312	42.0	
Liberal	Craigie Aitchison	7,379	30.0	
Unionist	Ralph Glyn	6,888	28.0	
Majority		2,933	12.0	
Turnout		24,579		
Labour gain from Unionist		Swing		

Stirling & Clackmannan Western
Party	Candidate	Votes	%	±%
Labour	Tom Johnston	9,919	55.0	
Unionist	Harry Hope	8,104	45.0	
Majority		1,815	10.0	
Turnout		18,023		
Labour gain from Unionist		Swing		

Western Isles
Party	Candidate	Votes	%	±%
National Liberal	William Cotts	6,177	54.1	+11.6
Liberal	Donald Murray	5,238	45.9	−1.4
Majority		939	8.2	+3.4
Turnout		11,415	54.1	+10.5
National Liberal gain from Liberal		Swing	6.5	

== Wales ==
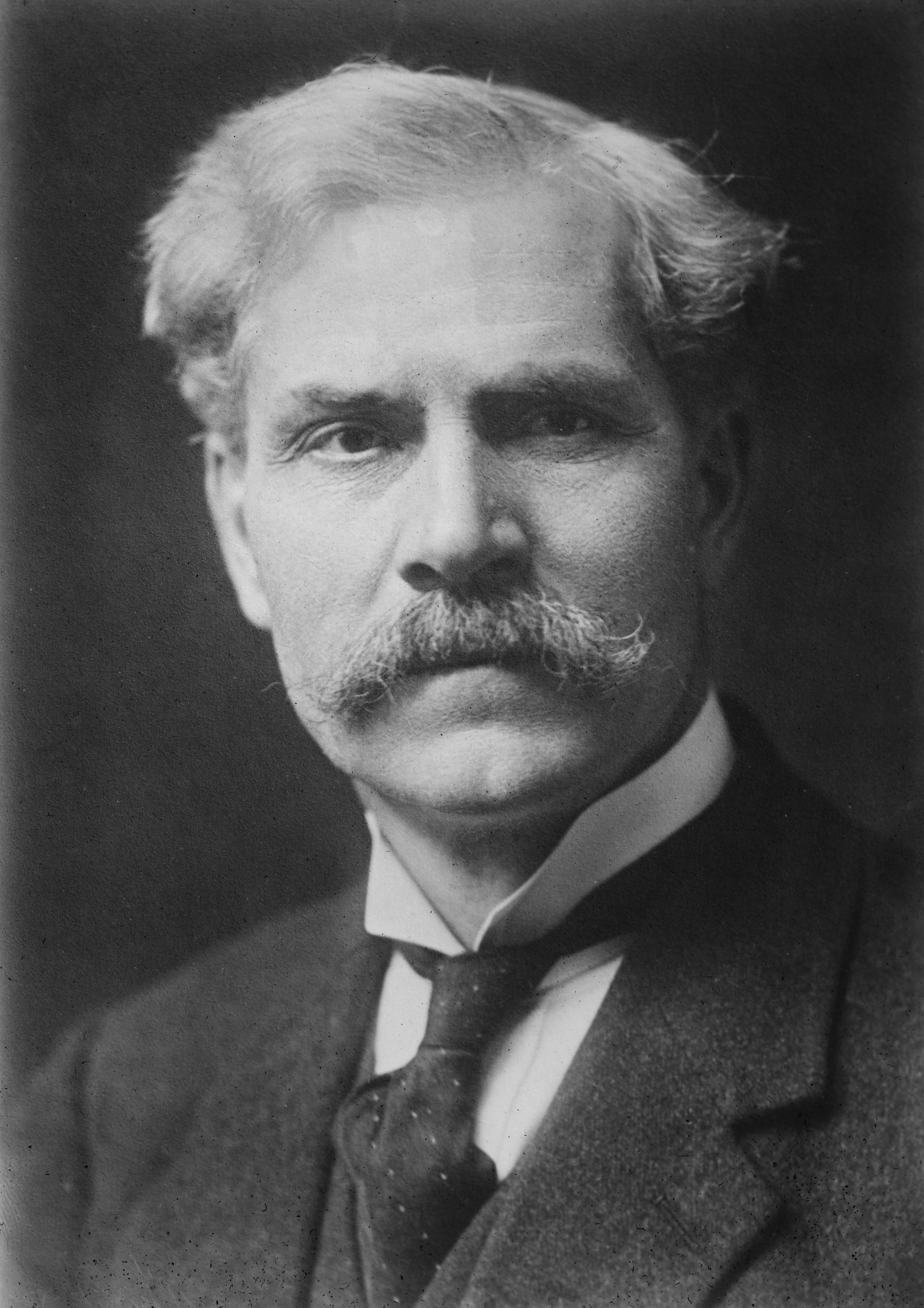
MacDonald

Aberavon
Party	Candidate	Votes	%	±%
Labour	Ramsay MacDonald	14,318	46.6	+10.9
Unionist	Sidney Hutchinson Byass	11,111	36.1	n/a
National Liberal	Jack Edwards	5,238	17.3	−45.5
Majority		3,207	10.5	−16.5
Turnout			88.6	
Labour gain from Liberal		Swing	+28.2	

Aberdare
Party	Candidate	Votes	%	±%
Labour	George Hall	20,704	57.2	+35.8
National Liberal	Charles Stanton	15,487	42.8	−35.8
Majority		5,217	14.4	71.6
Turnout		36,191	79.9	+10.1
Labour gain from National Liberal		Swing	+35.8	

Abertillery
Party	Candidate	Votes	%	±%
Labour	George Barker	unopposed	n/a	n/a
Labour win				

Bedwellty
Party	Candidate	Votes	%	±%
Labour	Charles Edwards	17,270	63.0	
Unionist	C.E. Bagram	10,132	37.0	n/a
Majority		7,138	26.0	
Turnout		27,402		
Labour hold		Swing		

Jenkins

Brecon and Radnor
Party	Candidate	Votes	%	±%
National Liberal	William Albert Jenkins	20,405	67.4	
Labour	Edward John	9,850	32.6	n/a
Majority		10,555	34.8	
Turnout			77.9	
National Liberal hold		Swing		

Caerphilly
Party	Candidate	Votes	%	±%
Labour	Morgan Jones	13,759	57.2	+2.4
Unionist	Alan McLean	10,165	42.8	n/a
Majority		4,025	14.4	−4.3
Turnout			78.6	+14.6
Labour hold		Swing	n/a	

Cardiff Central
Party	Candidate	Votes	%	±%
Unionist	James Childs Gould	13,885	50.0	+8.9
Labour	James Ewart Edmunds	8,169	29.4	+7.0
Liberal	C.F. Sanders	5,732	20.6	+0.5
Majority		5,716	20.6	+1.9
Turnout			74.4	
Unionist hold		Swing		

Cardiff East
Party	Candidate	Votes	%	±%
Unionist	Lewis Lougher	8,804	36.8	+6.1
Liberal	Henry Webb	7,622	31.8	−9.0
Labour	Arthur James Williams	7,506	31.4	+2.9
Majority		1,182	5.0	15.2
Turnout			81.0	+16.4
Unionist gain from Liberal		Swing	+7.6	

Cardiff South
Party	Candidate	Votes	%	±%
Unionist	James Cory	7,929	36.4	−12.0
Liberal	Bernard Freyberg	6,996	32.2	+7.0
Labour	David Pole	6,831	31.9	−5.6
Majority		933	4.2	−17.9
Turnout		21,756	74.9	+17.1
Unionist hold		Swing	-9.5	

Evans

Cardiganshire
Party	Candidate	Votes	%	±%
National Liberal	Ernest Evans	12,825	51.0	n/a
Liberal	Rhys Hopkin Morris	12,310	49.0	n/a
Majority		515	2.0	n/a
Turnout			76.9	n/a
National Liberal hold		Swing	n/a	

Carmarthen
Party	Candidate	Votes	%	±%
National Liberal	John Hinds	12,530	41.8	n/a
Unionist	George Coventry	8,805	29.4	n/a
National Farmers' Union	Daniel Johns	4,775	15.9	n/a
Liberal	H. Llewelyn-Williams	3,847	12.8	n/a
Majority		3,725	12.4	n/a
Turnout		29,957	82.7	n/a
National Liberal hold		Swing	n/a	

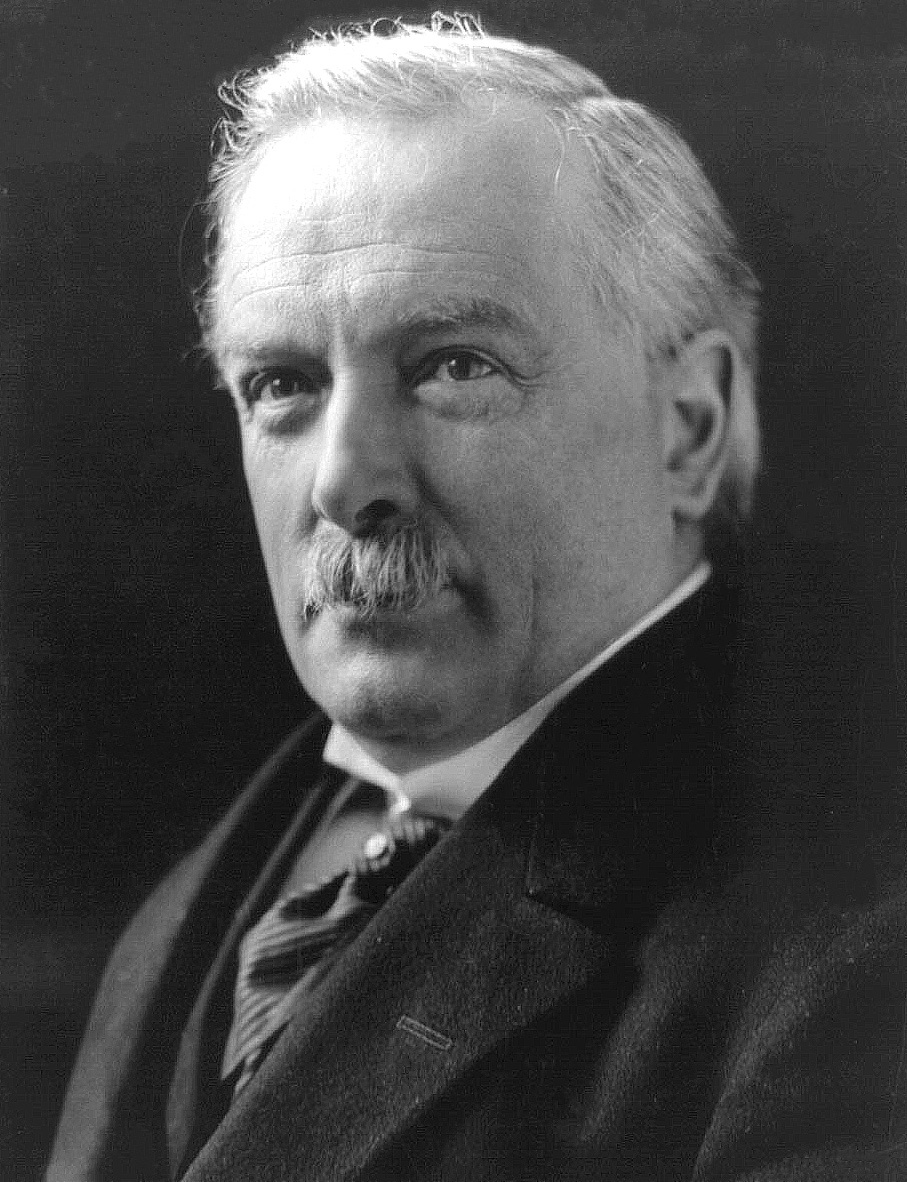
Lloyd George

Carnarvon Boroughs
Party	Candidate	Votes	%	±%
National Liberal	David Lloyd George	Unopposed	n/a	n/a
National Liberal hold		Swing	n/a	

Carnarvonshire
Party	Candidate	Votes	%	±%
Labour	Robert Jones	14,016	53.0	+18.4
National Liberal	Charles Edward Breese	12,407	47.0	+2.5
Majority		1,609	6.0	15.9
Turnout		26,423	70.6	
Labour gain from National Liberal		Swing	+8.0	

Denbigh
Party	Candidate	Votes	%	±%
National Liberal	John Cledwyn Davies	12,975	53.9	−29.4
Unionist	Lesley Venetia Elizabeth Brodrick	9,138	37.9	n/a
Liberal	Llewellyn G Williams	1,974	8.2	n/a
Majority		3,837	16.0	−50.6
Turnout			76.7	+10.1
National Liberal hold		Swing	n/a	

Ebbw Vale
Party	Candidate	Votes	%	±%
Labour	Evan Davies	16,947	65.4	n/a
Unionist	Morgan Morgan	8,951	34.6	n/a
Majority		7,996	30.8	n/a
Turnout		25,898	78.2	n/a
Labour hold		Swing	n/a	

Parry

Flintshire
Party	Candidate	Votes	%	±%
National Liberal	Thomas Henry Parry	16,854	44.2	n/a
Unionist	Austin Ellis Lloyd Jones	15,080	39.6	n/a
Labour	David Gwynfryn Jones	6,163	16.2	n/a
Majority		1,774	4.6	n/a
Turnout			79.4	n/a
National Liberal hold		Swing		

Gower
Party	Candidate	Votes	%	±%
Labour	David Rhys Grenfell	13,388	54.2	−0.6
Liberal	Frederick William Davies	11,302	45.8	+0.6
Majority		2,086	8.4	−1.2
Turnout			74.6	+12.4
Labour hold		Swing	-0.6	

Llandaff and Barry
Party	Candidate	Votes	%	±%
Unionist	William Cope	13,129	44.1	−17.9
Labour	James Lovat-Fraser	9,031	30.4	−0.4
Liberal	John Claxton Meggitt	7,577	25.5	n/a
Majority		4,098	13.7	−17.5
Turnout			76.8	+13.8
Unionist hold		Swing	-8.7	

Llanelly
Party	Candidate	Votes	%	±%
Labour	John Henry Williams	23,213	59.3	+12.4
National Liberal	G. Clarke Williams	15,947	40.7	−12.4
Majority		7,266	18.6	24.8
Turnout			80.3	+11.4
Labour gain from National Liberal		Swing	+12.4	

Merioneth
Party	Candidate	Votes	%	±%
Liberal	Henry Haydn Jones	9,903	58.3	n/a
Labour	John Jones Roberts	7,070	41.7	n/a
Majority		2,833	16.6	n/a
Turnout		16,973		n/a
Liberal hold		Swing	n/a	

Merthyr
Party	Candidate	Votes	%	±%
Labour	R. C. Wallhead	17,516	53.0	+5.7
Independent	Richard Mathias	15,552	47.0	n/a
Majority		1,964	6.0	11.4
Turnout			90.6	+
Labour gain from Liberal		Swing	n/a	

Monmouth
Party	Candidate	Votes	%	±%
Unionist	Leolin Forestier-Walker	unopposed	n/a	n/a
Unionist hold		Swing	n/a	

Montgomeryshire
Party	Candidate	Votes	%	±%
Liberal	David Davies	unopposed	n/a	n/a
Liberal hold		Swing	n/a	

Neath
Party	Candidate	Votes	%	±%
Labour	William Jenkins	19,566	59.5	+24.3
National Liberal	Hugh Edwards	13,331	40.5	−24.3
Majority		6,235	19.0	48.6
Turnout			75.4	+4.8
Labour gain from National Liberal		Swing	+24.3	

Newport
Party	Candidate	Votes	%	±%
Unionist	Reginald Clarry	19,019	54.3	n/a
Labour	John William Bowen	16,000	45.7	+4.7
Majority		3,019	8.6	+24.0
Turnout			82.1	+19.9
Unionist gain from Liberal		Swing	n/a	

Ogmore
Party	Candidate	Votes	%	±%
Labour	Vernon Hartshorn	17,321	55.8	n/a
National Liberal	John Walter Jones	7,498	24.1	n/a
Unionist	Dorothy Caroline Edmondes	6,577	20.1	n/a
Majority		8,823	31.7	n/a
Turnout			78.3	n/a
Labour hold		Swing	n/a	

Lloyd George

Pembrokeshire
Party	Candidate	Votes	%	±%
National Liberal	Gwilym Lloyd George	21,569	69.0	
Labour	William James Jenkins	9,703	31.0	
Majority		11,866	38.0	
Turnout		31,272		
National Liberal hold		Swing		

Pontypool
Party	Candidate	Votes	%	±%
Labour	Thomas Griffiths	11,198	40.6	+1.6
Unionist	Thomas George Jones	8,654	31.4	−1.1
Liberal	Robert Lowden Connell	7,733	28.0	−0.5
Majority		2,544	9.2	+2.7
Turnout			85.0	+12.9
Labour hold		Swing	-0.3	

Pontypridd
Party	Candidate	Votes	%	±%
Labour	Thomas Isaac Mardy Jones	14,884	47.2	+4.4
National Liberal	Rhys Rhys-Williams	8,667	27.5	−28.6
Unionist	J. Griffith Jones	7,994	25.4	+24.3
Majority		6,217	19.7	+6.5
Turnout		31,545	76.8	
Labour hold		Swing	+2.9	

Rhondda East
Party	Candidate	Votes	%	±%
Labour	David Watts-Morgan	17,146	55.0	n/a
National Liberal	Frederick William Heale	14,025	45.0	n/a
Majority		3,121	10.0	n/a
Turnout			80.9	n/a
Labour hold		Swing	n/a	

Rhondda West
Party	Candidate	Votes	%	±%
Labour	William John	18,001	62.1	n/a
Unionist	Gwilym Rowlands	10,990	37.9	n/a
Majority		7,011	24.2	n/a
Turnout		28,991	83.7	n/a
Labour hold		Swing	n/a	

Swansea East
Party	Candidate	Votes	%	±%
Labour	David Williams	11,333	50.9	+14.5
National Liberal	E. Harries	10,926	49.1	−14.5
Majority		407	1.8	29.0
Turnout			81.7	+17.6
Labour gain from National Liberal		Swing	+14.5	

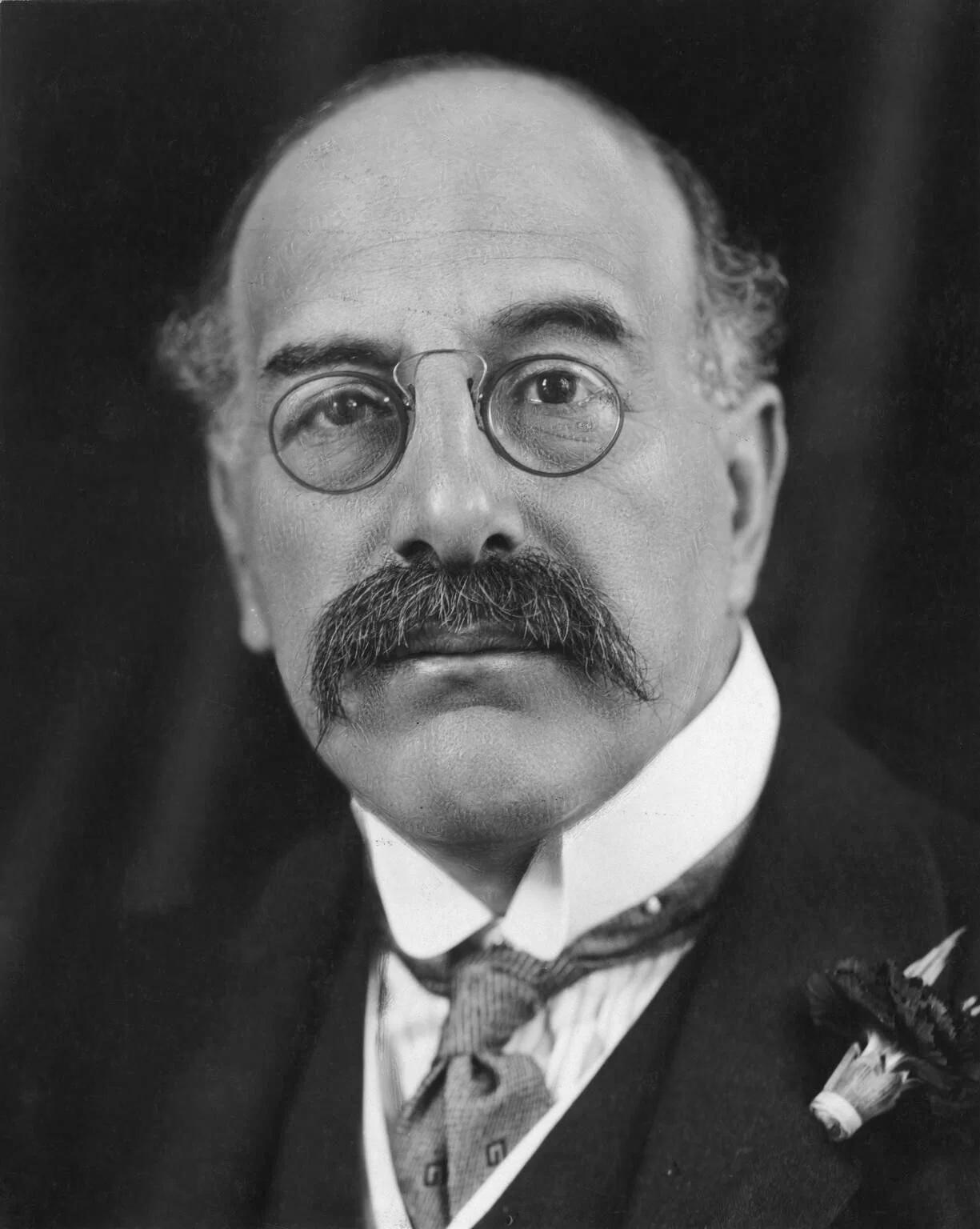
Mond

Swansea West
Party	Candidate	Votes	%	±%
National Liberal	Alfred Mond	9,278	35.5	−4.5
Unionist	William Hewins	8,476	32.4	−2.0
Labour	Howel Samuel	8,401	32.1	+6.5
Majority		802	3.1	−2.5
Turnout			83.9	+16.5
National Liberal hold		Swing	-1.25	

Wrexham
Party	Candidate	Votes	%	±%
Labour	Robert Richards	11,940	35.8	+12.1
National Liberal	E R Davies	10,842	32.6	−43.7
Unionist	R C G Roberts	10,508	31.6	n/a
Majority		1,098	3.2	55.8
Turnout			84.4	+14.7
Labour gain from Liberal		Swing	+27.9	

== Northern Ireland ==
Antrim (2 seats)
Party	Candidate	Votes	%	±%
UUP	Charles Craig	Unopposed	n/a	n/a
UUP	Hugh O'Neill	Unopposed	n/a	n/a
UUP win (new seat)				

Armagh
Party	Candidate	Votes	%	±%
UUP	William Allen	Unopposed	n/a	n/a
UUP win (new seat)				

Belfast East
Party	Candidate	Votes	%	±%
UUP	Herbert Dixon	Unopposed	n/a	n/a
UUP hold		Swing	n/a	

Belfast North
Party	Candidate	Votes	%	±%
UUP	Thomas McConnell	Unopposed	n/a	n/a
UUP win (new seat)				

Belfast South
Party	Candidate	Votes	%	±%
UUP	Thomas Moles	Unopposed	n/a	n/a
UUP win (new seat)				

Belfast West
Party	Candidate	Votes	%	±%
UUP	Robert Lynn	Unopposed	n/a	n/a
UUP win (new seat)				

Down (2 seats)
Party	Candidate	Votes	%	±%
UUP	David Reid	Unopposed	n/a	n/a
UUP	John Morrow Simms	Unopposed	n/a	n/a
UUP win (new seat)				

Fermanagh and Tyrone (2 seats)
Party	Candidate	Votes	%	±%
Nationalist	Thomas Harbison	45,236	27.0	n/a
Nationalist	Cahir Healy	44,817	26.8	n/a
UUP	James Pringle	38,640	23.1	n/a
UUP	William Allen	38,589	23.1	n/a
Majority		6,177		n/a
Turnout				n/a
Nationalist win (new seat)				

Londonderry
Party	Candidate	Votes	%	±%
UUP	Malcolm Macnaghten	30,743	75.7	n/a
Ind. Unionist	Edmund Loftus MacNaghten	9,861	24.3	n/a
Majority		20,882	51.4	n/a
Turnout		40,604	63.9	n/a
UUP win (new seat)				

- anti-partition

== Universities ==
Cambridge University (2 seats)
Party	Candidate	Votes	%	±%
Unionist	John Frederick Peel Rawlinson	4,192	49.4	+14.2
Independent Liberal	J. R. M. Butler	3,453	39.9	+39.9
Unionist	William Ritchie Sorley	1,018	11.7	+11.7
Quota		2,888		
Turnout		8,663	63.7	
Independent Liberal gain from Unionist		Swing		

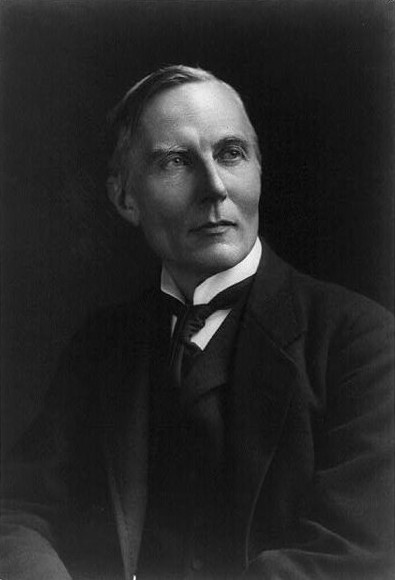
Fisher

Combined English Universities (2 seats)
Party	Candidate	FPv%	Count				
Party	Candidate	FPv%	1	2	3	4	5
Unionist	Martin Conway	32.8	968	982	1,093		
National Liberal	H. A. L. Fisher	27.7	819	821	849	883	1,009
Independent	John Strong	19.4	571	575	595	611	813
Labour	Leonard Woolf	12.2	361	361	365	366	eliminated
Ind. Unionist	Wilfred Barnard Faraday	4.8	141	206	eliminated		
Ind. Unionist	Sidney C. Lawrence	3.1	90	eliminated			
Electorate: 3,967 Valid: 2,946 Quota: 983 Turnout: 74.3

Cowan

Combined Scottish Universities (3 seats)
Party	Candidate	Votes	%	±%
Unionist	George Andreas Berry	unopposed	n/a	n/a
Liberal	Dugald Cowan	unopposed	n/a	n/a
Unionist	Henry Craik	unopposed	n/a	n/a

London University
Party	Candidate	Votes	%	±%
Unionist	Sydney Russell-Wells	3,833	51.52	+9.96
Liberal	Albert Pollard	2,180	29.30	+29.30
Labour	H. G. Wells	1,427	19.18	−12.49
Majority		1,653	22.22	+12.33
Turnout		7,440	67.64	−1.37
Unionist hold		Swing	n/a	

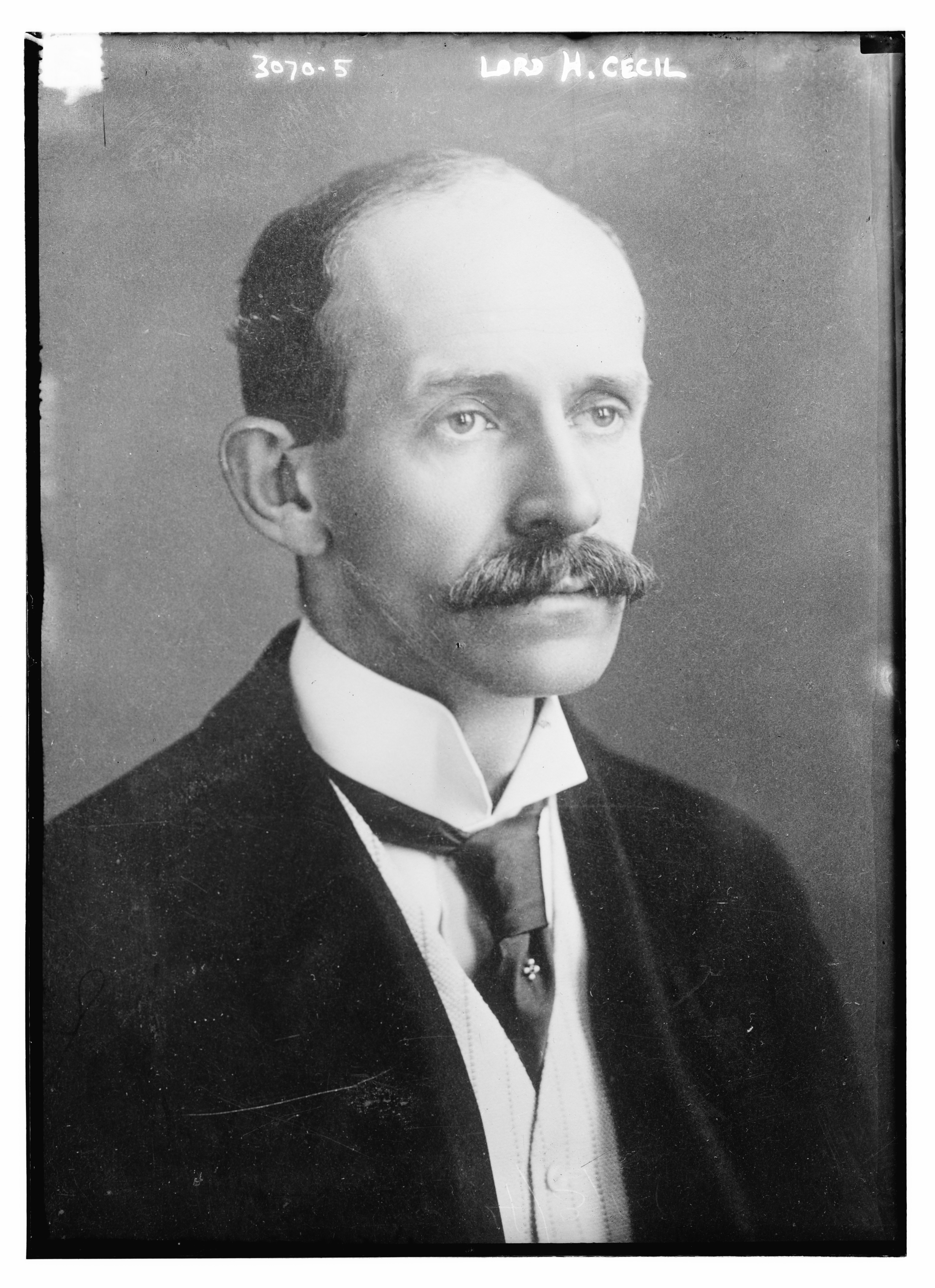
Cecil

Oxford University (2 seats)
Party	Candidate	FPv%	Count	
Party	Candidate	FPv%	1	2
Unionist	Hugh Cecil	56.40	3,185	
Unionist	Charles Oman	18.03	1,018	2,170
Liberal	Gilbert Murray	25.57	1,444	1,594
Electorate: 9,374 Valid: 5,647 Quota: 1,883 Turnout: 60.24

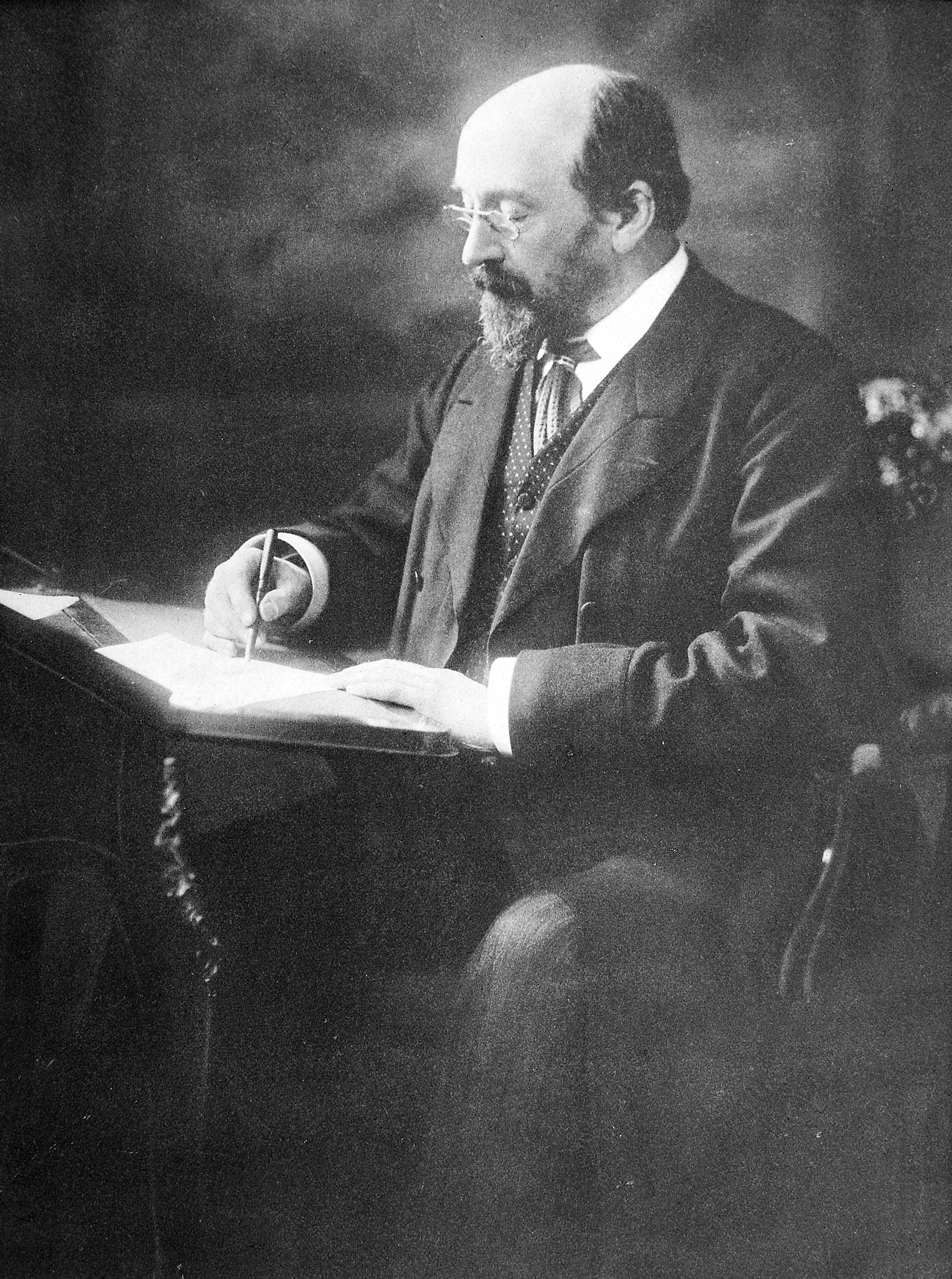
Whitla

Queen's University of Belfast
Party	Candidate	Votes	%	±%
UUP	William Whitla	Unopposed	n/a	n/a
UUP hold		Swing	n/a	

Lewis

University of Wales
Party	Candidate	Votes	%	±%
National Liberal	Thomas Arthur Lewis	487	39.5	− 41.3
Liberal	Ellis Ellis-Griffith	451	35.9	n/a
Labour	Olive Wheeler	309	24.8	+5.6
Majority		46	3.6	−58.0
Turnout		1,247	87.2	+1.4
National Liberal hold		Swing	n/a	
