= John Tyson Wigan =

British army officer and politician (1877–1952)

Brigadier-General John Tyson Wigan CB CMG DSO
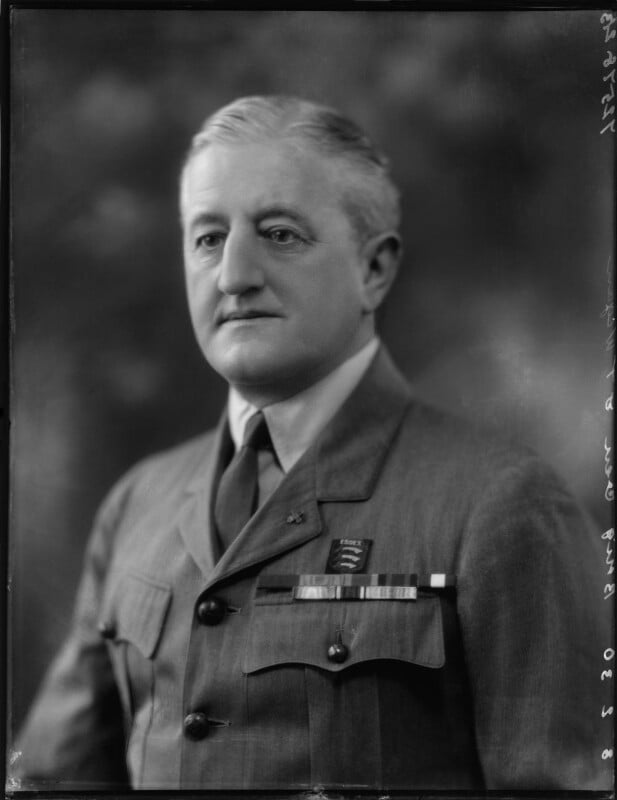
- Wigan in 1930
- Born: 31 July 1877; West Hartlepool, Durham, England
- Died: 23 November 1952 (aged 75); Cuckfield, West Sussex, England
- Military career
- Allegiance: United Kingdom
- Branch: British Army
- Service years: May 1897–1919
- Rank: Brigadier-General
- Units: 13th Hussars; Berkshire Yeomanry
- Commands: Berkshire Yeomanry; 7th Mounted Brigade; 22nd Mounted Brigade
- Conflicts: Second Boer War; First World War • Battle of Gallipoli • Sinai and Palestine Campaign
- Other work: MP for Abingdon; High Sheriff of Essex

Brigadier-General John Tyson Wigan, CB, CMG, DSO (31 July 1877 – 23 November 1952) was a senior British Army officer and later a Conservative Party politician. He served with the Desert Mounted Corps during World War I, and was wounded in action three times during campaigning at the Battle of Gallipoli and during the Sinai and Palestine Campaign. He had previously been badly wounded in the Second Boer War.

Following his retirement from the army post-war, Wigan was a Member of Parliament (MP) for three years.

== Life ==
John Wigan was born in July 1877 in West Hartlepool and educated at Rugby School before joining the British Army in May 1897 as a second lieutenant with the 13th Hussars. He was promoted to the rank of lieutenant on 8 March 1899, and later that year was deployed to South Africa for service in the Second Boer War. While in South Africa he was severely wounded during reconnaissance near Sundays River (in Cape Colony) in March 1900. He stayed in South Africa throughout the war, and was promoted to the rank of captain on 26 March 1902. Following the end of hostilities, he left South Africa with other men of his regiment on the SS City of Vienna, which arrived at Southampton in October 1902. In 1909, Wigan retired from the regular army and transferred to the Territorial Force with the Berkshire Yeomanry. This force was activated at the outbreak of World War I and sent to the Mediterranean.

Wigan was seriously wounded in 1915 during the Battle of Gallipoli while in command of the Berkshire Yeomanry, and was awarded the Distinguished Service Order (DSO) the following year in acknowledgement of his service. The Berkshire Yeomanry moved to Egypt in 1916 and in April 1917 Wigan was again wounded at the Second Battle of Gaza. In July 1917, Wigan was advanced to the temporary rank of brigadier general to command the 7th Mounted Brigade and in November 1917 this force was deployed in the Third Battle of Gaza at which Wigan was wounded for a fourth time in an attack on Turkish trench lines. On 7 April 1918, he was appointed to command of the 22nd Mounted Brigade (later redesignated the 12th Cavalry Brigade) in the 4th Cavalry Division, a command he held until the end of the war.

In 1918 Wigan was made a Companion of the Order of St Michael and St George (CMG) in recognition of his service and in 1919 a Companion of the Order of the Bath (CB). At the end of the war, the yeomanry was decommissioned and Wigan entered politics as MP for Abingdon. He was on the governing body of Abingdon School from 1918 to 1921. In 1921 Wigan gave up his seat and retired, later serving as High Sheriff of Essex in 1930.

Wigan married Aline the eldest daughter of Mr H. W. Hederson in 1911. They had two sons and a daughter.

Wigan bought Danbury Palace in 1919 and lived there until 1946 when it was sold. During WWII from 1939 until 1946 Wigan and his wife resided at the palace while the palace was used as an emergency maternity hospital.

Wigan died in Cuckfield, West Sussex, in November 1952.

== Bibliography ==
- Becke, Archibald F. (1936). Order of Battle of Divisions Part 2A. The Territorial Force Mounted Divisions and the 1st-Line Territorial Force Divisions (42–56). London: HMSO. OCLC 4405016.
- Davies, Frank; Maddocks, Graham (1995). Bloody Red Tabs. Leo Cooper. ISBN 0-85052-463-6.
- Perry, F.W. (1993). Order of Battle of Divisions Part 5B. Indian Army Divisions. Newport: Ray Westlake Military Books. ISBN 1-871167-23-X.

Parliament of the United Kingdom
Preceded by Archie Kirkman Loyd	Member of Parliament for Abingdon; 1918–1921	Succeeded by Arthur Loyd
Honorary titles
Preceded by K. J. Kincaid-Smith	High Sheriff of Essex; 1930–1931	Succeeded by Robert E. Cahill
