= Ralph Glyn, 1st Baron Glyn =

British politician (1884–1960)

Major The Right Honourable The Lord Glyn MC DL

Member of Parliament for Abingdon
- In office 1924–1953
- Preceded by: Edward Lessing
- Succeeded by: Airey Neave
- Majority: 4,000

Member of Parliament for Clackmannan and Eastern Stirlingshire
- In office 1918–1922
- Preceded by: New constituency
- Succeeded by: Lauchlan MacNeill Weir

Parliamentary Private Secretary to the Prime Minister
- In office 1931–1935 Serving with John Worthington (1931–1935); Frank Markham (1931–1932)
- Prime Minister: Ramsay McDonald
- Preceded by: Robert Morrison
- Succeeded by: Geoffrey Lloyd

Personal details
- Born: Ralph George Campbell Glyn; 3 March 1884
- Died: 1 May 1960 (aged 76) Oxfordshire
- Party: Conservative
- Spouse: Sibell Vanden Bempde-Johnstone (m. 1921–1958, her death)
- Relatives: Edward Carr Glyn; George Glyn, 1st Baron Wolverton
- Education: Wixenford, Wokingham; Harrow School
- Alma mater: Royal Military College, Sandhurst

Military service
- Allegiance: United Kingdom
- Branch/service: British Army
- Years of service: 1914–1918
- Rank: Major
- Battles/wars: First World War
- Awards: Military Cross

Major Ralph George Campbell Glyn, 1st Baron Glyn, Bt, MC, DL (3 March 1884 – 1 May 1960), known as Sir Ralph Glyn, 1st Baronet, from 1934 to 1953, was a soldier and Conservative Party politician in the United Kingdom. He was a Member of Parliament (MP) from 1918 to 1922, and from 1924 to 1953.

== Early life ==
Glyn was born on 3 March 1884 to Edward Glyn, Bishop of Peterborough and Lady Emma Mary, daughter of George Campbell, 8th Duke of Argyll. His father was the younger son of George Glyn, 1st Baron Wolverton. He was educated at Wixenford, Harrow, and the Royal Military College, Sandhurst.

== Career ==
=== Military service ===
Glyn fought in the First World War, during which he was mentioned in despatches and was awarded the Military Cross.

=== Political career ===
At the 1918 general election, Glyn was elected as Unionist MP for the Scottish constituency of Clackmannan and Eastern Stirlingshire. However he lost the seat at the 1922 general election, coming third with 28% of the votes. The following year, at the 1923 general election, Glyn stood in the Conservative-held seat of Abingdon, where the MP Arthur Loyd was not standing again. Lloyd's majority in 1922 had been only 640 votes, and Glyn lost by 254 votes (1.2% of the total) to the Liberal candidate Edward Lessing.

However, at the 1924 general election, Glyn substantially increased his vote, and won the seat with a majority of over 4,000 votes. He represented the constituency for nearly thirty years, and was returned unopposed at the 1931 election and at the 1935 election. He was made a baronet 21 January 1934, of Farnbo. h Downs, in the County of Berkshire, and in 1953 he was elevated to the peerage as Baron Glyn, of Farnborough in the County of Berkshire.

== Personal life ==
Lord Glyn married Sibell Vanden Bempde-Johnstone, daughter of Francis Vanden-Bempde-Johnstone, 2nd Baron Derwent and widow of Brigadier-General Walter Long, in 1921. She was the mother of Walter Long, 2nd Viscount Long. There were no children from the marriage. Lady Glyn died in 1958. Lord Glyn survived her by two years and died in Oxfordshire in 1960, aged 75, when the baronetcy and barony became extinct.

Glyn was on the governing body of Abingdon School from 1924 to 1952 and again from 1955 to 1960 in addition to be the vice-chairman of the Governors from 1958 until his death in 1960. and the Mayor of Abingdon.

== Arms ==
Coat of arms of Ralph Glyn, 1st Baron Glyn
| Crest An eagle's head erased Sable guttee d'Or holding in the beak an escallop Argent. Escutcheon Argent an eagle displayed with two heads Sable guttee d'Or. Motto Fidei Tenax |

== Notes ==
Parliament of the United Kingdom
| New constituency | Member of Parliament for Clackmannan & Eastern Stirlingshire; 1918–1922 | Succeeded by Lauchlan MacNeill Weir |
| Preceded by Edward Lessing | Member of Parliament for Abingdon; 1924–1953 | Succeeded by Airey Neave |
Government offices
| Preceded by Robert Morrison | Parliamentary Private Secretary to the Prime Minister; 1931–1935 serving alongside John Worthington (1931–1935) and Frank Markham (1931–1932) | Succeeded by Geoffrey Lloyd |
Peerage of the United Kingdom
| New creation | Baron Glyn; 1953–1960 | Extinct |
Baronetage of the United Kingdom
| New creation | Baronet (of Farnborough Downs); 1934–1960 | Extinct |
