= Edward Lessing =

British politician

Edward Albert Lessing OBE (28 July 1890 – 25 August 1964) was a British corn trader, Liberal Party politician and an early authority on Soviet Russia.

== Background ==
He was born in Mayfair, London the son of Albert and Augusta Lessing. He was educated at Marlborough and University College, Oxford. In 1918 he was awarded the OBE.

== Professional career ==
Lessing qualified as a Barrister, having received a Call to Bar, by the Inner Temple. He was Chairman of Strauss & Company Limited, grain merchants. From 1945 to 1947 he worked as an Interpreter IO, Civil Servant. He was a Director of the Baltic and Mercantile Exchange. He was Vice-Chairman of the National Federation of Corn Trade Associations. He was Chairman of Alexandria Trading Corporation Limited. From 1960 until his death he was a Director of Contemporary Review. He was on the governing body of Abingdon School from 1923 to 1924.

== Military service ==
During the First World War of 1914–1918, he served in Europe as a captain in the Grenadier Guards. He was a Member of the Military Mission to Russia. During the Second World War of 1939–1945 he served as a lieutenant in the Paymaster Royal Army Pay Corps from 1939 to 1942, and as a captain in the Pioneer Corps from 1942 to 1945.

== Political service ==
In 1922, he stood as the Liberal candidate in the Unionist-held constituency of Abingdon, in Buckinghamshire. Here Unionist Party candidates had been returned at every election since 1910. The last Liberal candidate to win here was Edward Strauss who was Lessing's uncle. The Unionist was unopposed at the 1918 general election and at the 1921 Abingdon by-election. It therefore came as a bit of a surprise when Lessing lost by only 540 votes to the sitting Member of Parliament (MP) Arthur Loyd;

General election 1922 Electorate 26,541
| Party | Candidate | Votes | % | ±% |
|---|---|---|---|---|
| Unionist | Arthur Thomas Loyd | 10,507 | 51.3 | n/a |
| Liberal | Edward Albert Lessing | 9,967 | 48.7 | n/a |
| Majority | | 540 | 2.6 | n/a |
| Turnout | | | 77.1 | n/a |
| Unionist hold | | Swing | n/a | |

At the 1923 general election he won, with a majority of 254 votes over Ralph Glyn, Lloyd's successor as Unionist candidate.

General election 1923 Electorate 27,183
| Party | Candidate | Votes | % | ±% |
|---|---|---|---|---|
| Liberal | Edward Albert Lessing | 10,932 | 50.6 | +1.9 |
| Unionist | Ralph George Campbell Glyn | 10,678 | 49.4 | −1.9 |
| Majority | | 254 | 1.2 | −1.4 |
| Turnout | | | 79.5 | +2.4 |
| Liberal gain from Unionist | | Swing | | |

In parliament, the Liberal Party relied on Lessing's expertise on Soviet Russia. In August 1924, when the Labour government tried to push through parliament a proposed loan to the Soviet Union, Lessing led Liberal party objections and the proposal was defeated. Lessing issued a pamphlet severely criticising the treaty. Lessing served as Member of Parliament for less than a year, before another General election was called. This time, for the first time in Abingdon's history, a Labour candidate stood. This was a factor in Lessing losing his seat to Glyn at the 1924 general election;

General election 1924 Electorate 28,082
| Party | Candidate | Votes | % | ±% |
|---|---|---|---|---|
| Unionist | Ralph George Campbell Glyn | 13,117 | 56.4 | +7.0 |
| Liberal | Edward Albert Lessing | 8,805 | 37.8 | −12.8 |
| Labour | D F Brundril | 1,355 | 5.8 | n/a |
| Majority | | 4,312 | 18.6 | 19.8 |
| Turnout | | | 82.9 | +3.4 |
| Unionist gain from Liberal | | Swing | +9.9 | |

He lost again at the 1929 election;

General election 1929 Electorate 36,758
| Party | Candidate | Votes | % | ±% |
|---|---|---|---|---|
| Unionist | Ralph George Campbell Glyn | 14,094 | 47.4 | −9.0 |
| Liberal | Edward Albert Lessing | 11,896 | 40.1 | +2.3 |
| Labour | A E Edgeworth Reade | 3,712 | 12.5 | +6.7 |
| Majority | | 2,198 | 7.3 | −11.3 |
| Turnout | | | 80.8 | −2.1 |
| Unionist hold | | Swing | -5.7 | |

He did not stand for Parliament again.

== Publications ==
- Soviet Treaties: An Examination of the General Treaty and the Treaty of Commerce and Navigation. Signed on 8 August 1924

He died in Kensington aged 73.

Parliament of the United Kingdom
| Preceded by Arthur Loyd | Member of Parliament for Abingdon; 1923–1924 | Succeeded by Ralph Glyn |
