= 1953 Abingdon by-election =

UK parliamentary by-election

The 1953 Abingdon by-election was held on 30 June 1953 after the previous MP, Ralph Glyn was elevated to the peerage. It was retained by the Conservatives.

1953 Abingdon by-election Electorate
Party	Candidate	Votes	%	±%
Conservative	Airey Neave	22,986	53.24	−2.23
Labour	Ted Castle	17,126	39.67	−4.86
Liberal	George R Allen	3,060	7.09	New
Majority		5,860	13.57	+2.64
Turnout		43,172	75.90	−4.06
Conservative hold		Swing	+1.3	
