= 1921 Abingdon by-election =

UK Parliamentary by-election

The 1921 Abingdon by-election was held on 14 May 1921. The by-election was held due to the resignation of the incumbent Coalition Conservative MP, John Tyson Wigan. It was won by the unopposed Coalition Conservative candidate Arthur Loyd.

== Result ==
Abingdon by-election, 1921
Party		Candidate	Votes	%	±%
C	Unionist	Arthur Loyd	Unopposed		
	Unionist hold				
C indicates candidate endorsed by the coalition government.
