= Arthur Loyd =

Arthur Thomas Loyd (19 April 1882 – 8 November 1944) was a Conservative Party politician in England.

== Early life ==
Born in Northampton, Loyd belonged to a Welsh family, several members of which settled in Berkshire. His uncle, Archie Kirkman Loyd, was the Conservative member of parliament for Abingdon from 1895 to 1906 and from 1916 to 1918. In 1920, Loyd inherited Lockinge House from Lady Wantage, the wife of his father's second cousin.

== Political career ==
Loyd was subsequently elected MP for Abingdon at a by-election in 1921, and represented the division until he stood down at the 1923 general election.

== Other work ==
He was on the governing body of Abingdon School from 1921 to 1923 and again from 1935 to 1944 in addition to be the Chairman of the Governors from 1939 until his death in 1944. He later served as Lord Lieutenant of Berkshire from 1935 until his death in Stepney in 1944 aged 62.

Parliament of the United Kingdom
Preceded by John Tyson Wigan	Member of Parliament for Abingdon; 1921–1923	Succeeded by Edward Albert Lessing
Honorary titles
Preceded by James Herbert Benyon	Lord Lieutenant of Berkshire; 1935–1944	Succeeded by Henry Benyon
