= Maria Norris =

- Born: 1827; London
- Died: 1894; Fulham
- Occupations: Novelist, biographer, poet

Maria Norris (1827 – 1894) was a British poet, novelist, and biographer.

Maria Norris was born on 1827 in London, the eldest of six children of James and Anne Norris. James Norris was a stationer and publisher of the Railway Times, brother of the paper manufacturer and M.P. John Thomas Norris.

Norris regularly contributed to magazines starting in the late 1940s. She published two poems in Charles Dickens' Household Words in 1850. (Published anonymously, she was referred to in the magazine's office book only as Sophy Traddles, a character in David Copperfield, and her identity was unknown to Dickens scholars until 2015.) She published "A Few Words on Geology" in The Ladies' Cabinet in 1852 and contributed to the New Monthly Belle Assemblée.

She published a biography of Germaine de Staël in 1853 and a novel, Philip Lancaster, in 1854. Philip Lancaster was dedicated to Mary Russell Mitford and centered on two sisters in love with the same man.

In 1861, Norris was working as a milliner. She spent two decades operating a school in Newton Abbot with another woman, Charlotte Barber.

Maria Norris died in 1894 in Fulham, London.

== Bibliography ==
- The Life and Times of Madame de Staël, 1853.
- Philip Lancaster. 3 vol. London: Saunders and Otley, 1854.
