= Charles Lindsay (British politician) =

British politician

Colonel The Honourable Charles Lindsay CB
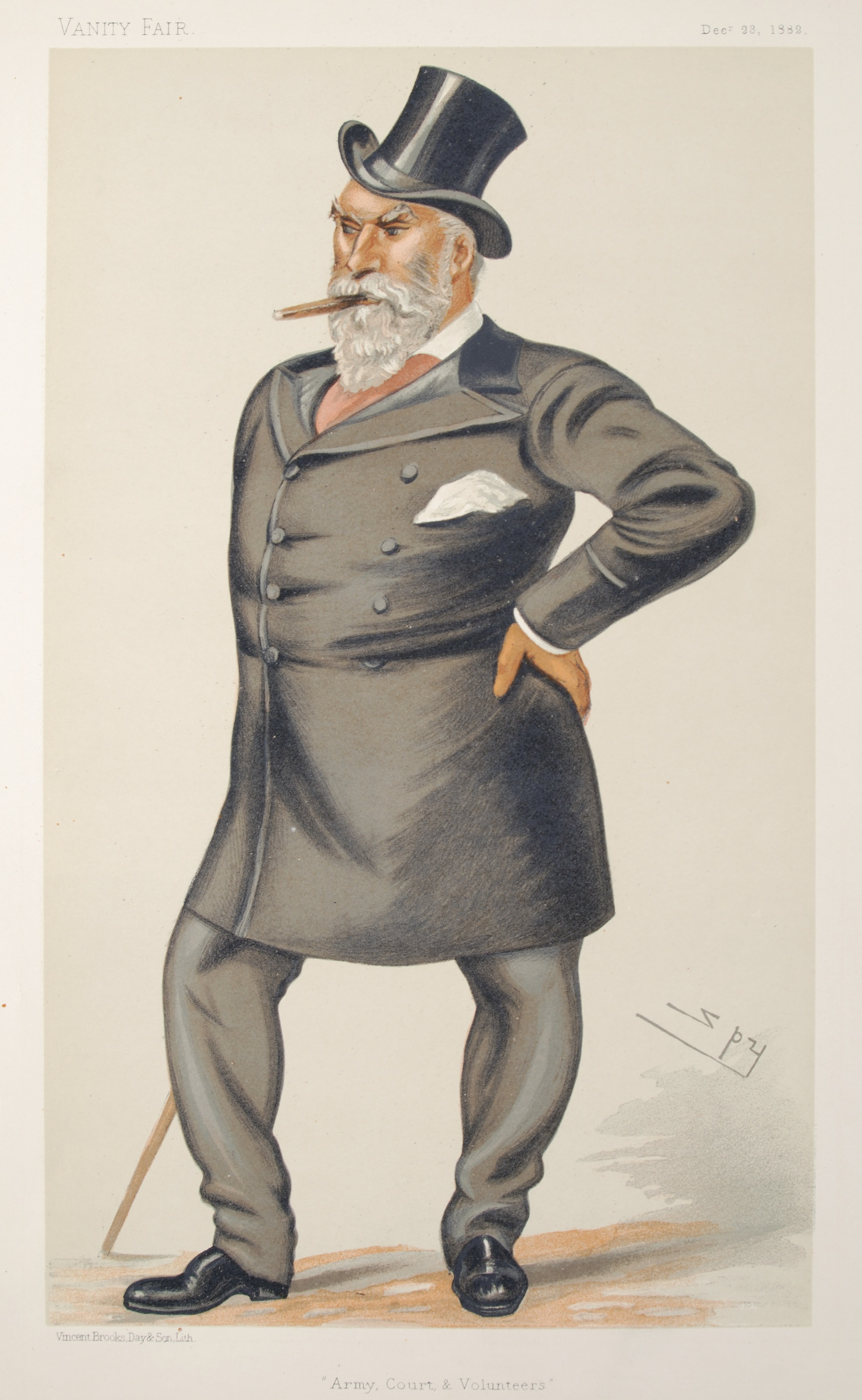
- Caricature by Spy published in Vanity Fair in 1882.

Member of Parliament for Abingdon
- In office 1865–1874
- Preceded by: John Thomas Norris
- Succeeded by: John Creemer Clarke

Personal details
- Born: Charles Hugh Lindsay; 11 November 1816
- Died: 25 March 1889 (aged 72)
- Spouse: Emilia Anne Browne (m. 1851)
- Children: Henry Lindsay; Violet Manners, Duchess of Rutland
- Parent(s): James Lindsay, 24th Earl of Crawford (father); Maria Pennington (mother)
- Relatives: Montague Browne (father-in-law)

Charles Hugh Lindsay CB (11 November 1816 – 25 March 1889) was a British soldier, courtier and Conservative politician.

== Background ==
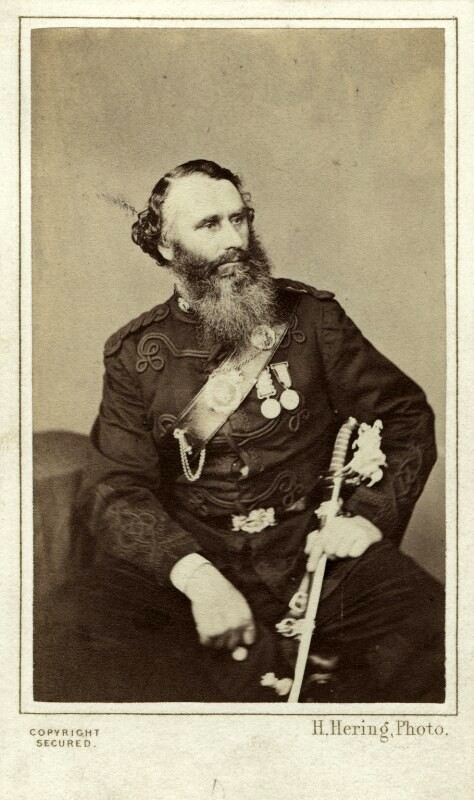
Charles Lindsay by H. Hering

Lindsay was born at Muncaster Castle, the third son of James Lindsay, 24th Earl of Crawford, and the Hon. Maria, daughter of John Pennington, 1st Baron Muncaster. Sir James Lindsay was his elder brother.

== Public life ==
Lindsay sat as Member of Parliament for Abingdon between 1865 and 1874. He was also a Lieutenant-Colonel in the Grenadier Guards and Colonel in the St George's Rifle Regiment and served as a Groom-in-Waiting to Queen Victoria.

== Family ==
Lindsay married Emilia Anne, daughter of the Very Reverend the Hon. Henry Montague Browne, Dean of Lismore, in 1851. His daughter Violet Lindsay was an artist. She married Henry Manners, 8th Duke of Rutland and was the mother of Lady Diana Cooper. Emilia Anne died in February 1873. Lindsay survived her by 16 years and died in March 1889, aged 72.

Parliament of the United Kingdom
Preceded by John Thomas Norris	Member of Parliament for Abingdon; 1865–1874	Succeeded by John Creemer Clarke
