= List of United Kingdom Parliament constituencies (1950–1974) by region =

1801 to 1832
1832 to 1868
1868 to 1885
1885 to 1918
1918 to 1950
1950 to 1974
1974 to 1983
1983 to 1997
1997 to 2024
2024 to present

This is a list of all constituencies that were in existence at the 1950, 1951, 1955, 1959, 1964, 1966 and 1970 general elections, showing the winning party and broken down by region and county.

== South West (43) ==
=== Cornwall (5) ===
Constituency	1950	1951	1955	1959	1964	1966	1970
Bodmin	Conservative	Conservative	Conservative	Conservative	Liberal	Liberal	Conservative
Cornwall North	Conservative	Conservative	Conservative	Conservative	Conservative	Liberal	Liberal
Falmouth and Camborne	Labour	Labour	Labour	Labour	Labour	Labour	Conservative
St Ives	National Liberal	National Liberal	National Liberal	National Liberal	National Liberal	National Liberal	Conservative
Truro	Conservative	Conservative	Conservative	Conservative	Conservative	Conservative	Conservative

=== Devon (10) ===
Constituency	1950	1951	1955	1959	1964	1966	1970
Devon North	Conservative	Conservative	Conservative	Liberal	Liberal	Liberal	Liberal
Exeter	Conservative	Conservative	Conservative	Conservative	Conservative	Labour	Conservative
Honiton	Conservative	Conservative	Conservative	Conservative	Conservative	Conservative	Conservative
Plymouth Devonport	Labour	Labour	Conservative	Conservative	Conservative	Conservative	Conservative
Plymouth Sutton	Labour	Conservative	Conservative	Conservative	Conservative	Labour	Labour
Tavistock	Conservative	Conservative	Conservative	Conservative	Conservative	Conservative	Conservative
Tiverton	Conservative	Conservative	Conservative	Conservative	Conservative	Conservative	Conservative
Torquay	Conservative	Conservative	Conservative	Conservative	Conservative	Conservative	Conservative
Torrington	National Liberal	National Liberal	National Liberal	Conservative	Conservative	Conservative	Conservative
Totnes	Conservative	Conservative	Conservative	Conservative	Conservative	Conservative	Conservative

=== Somerset (7) ===
Constituency	1950	1951	1955	1959	1964	1966	1970
Bath	Conservative	Conservative	Conservative	Conservative	Conservative	Conservative	Conservative
Bridgwater	Conservative	Conservative	Conservative	Conservative	Conservative	Conservative	Conservative
Somerset North	Conservative	Conservative	Conservative	Conservative	Conservative	Conservative	Conservative
Taunton	Conservative	Conservative	Conservative	Conservative	Conservative	Conservative	Conservative
Wells	Conservative	Conservative	Conservative	Conservative	Conservative	Conservative	Conservative
Weston-super-Mare	Conservative	Conservative	Conservative	Conservative	Conservative	Conservative	Conservative
Yeovil	Conservative	Conservative	Conservative	Conservative	Conservative	Conservative	Conservative

=== Dorset (4) ===
Constituency	1950	1951	1955	1959	1964	1966	1970
Dorset North	Conservative	Conservative	Conservative	Conservative	Conservative	Conservative	Conservative
Dorset South	Conservative	Conservative	Conservative	Conservative	Conservative	Conservative	Conservative
Dorset West	Conservative	Conservative	Conservative	Conservative	Conservative	Conservative	Conservative
Poole	Conservative	Conservative	Conservative	Conservative	Conservative	Conservative	Conservative

=== Gloucestershire (12) ===
Constituency	1950	1951	1955	1959	1964	1966	1970
Bristol Central	Labour	Labour	Labour	Labour	Labour Co-op	Labour Co-op	Labour Co-op
Bristol North East	Labour Co-op	Labour Co-op	Labour Co-op	National Liberal	National Liberal	Labour	Conservative
Bristol North West	Conservative	Conservative	Labour	Conservative	Conservative	Labour	Conservative
Bristol South	Labour	Labour	Labour	Labour	Labour	Labour	Labour
Bristol South East	Labour	Labour	Labour	Labour	Labour	Labour	Labour
Bristol West	Conservative	Conservative	Conservative	Conservative	Conservative	Conservative	Conservative
Cheltenham	Conservative	Conservative	Conservative	Conservative	Conservative	Conservative	Conservative
Cirencester and Tewkesbury	Conservative	Speaker (Con)	Speaker (Con)	Conservative	Conservative	Conservative	Conservative
Gloucester	Labour	Labour	Labour	Labour	Labour	Labour	Conservative
Gloucestershire South	Labour	Labour	Conservative	Conservative	Conservative	Conservative	Conservative
Gloucestershire West	Labour	Labour	Labour	Labour	Labour	Labour	Labour
Stroud and Thornbury / Stroud (from 1955)	Conservative	Conservative	Conservative	Conservative	Conservative	Conservative	Conservative

=== Wiltshire (5) ===
Constituency	1950	1951	1955	1959	1964	1966	1970
Chippenham	Conservative	Conservative	Conservative	Conservative	Conservative	Conservative	Conservative
Devizes	Conservative	Conservative	Conservative	Conservative	Conservative	Conservative	Conservative
Salisbury	Conservative	Conservative	Conservative	Conservative	Conservative	Conservative	Conservative
Swindon	Labour	Labour	Labour	Labour	Labour	Labour	Labour
Westbury	Conservative	Conservative	Conservative	Conservative	Conservative	Conservative	Conservative

== South East (including London) (147 to 1955; 150 from 1955) ==
=== Oxfordshire (3) ===
Constituency	1950	1951	1955	1959	1964	1966	1970
Banbury	Conservative	Conservative	Conservative	Conservative	Conservative	Conservative	Conservative
Henley	Conservative	Conservative	Conservative	Conservative	Conservative	Conservative	Conservative
Oxford	Conservative	Conservative	Conservative	Conservative	Conservative	Labour	Conservative

=== Buckinghamshire (5) ===
Constituency	1950	1951	1955	1959	1964	1966	1970
Aylesbury	Conservative	Conservative	Conservative	Conservative	Conservative	Conservative	Conservative
Buckingham	Labour	Conservative	Conservative	Conservative	Labour	Labour	Conservative
Buckinghamshire South	Conservative	Conservative	Conservative	Conservative	Conservative	Conservative	Conservative
Eton and Slough	Labour	Labour	Labour	Labour	Conservative	Labour	Labour
Wycombe	Labour	Conservative	Conservative	Conservative	Conservative	Conservative	Conservative

=== Berkshire (6 then 5) ===
Constituency		1950	1951	1955	1959	1964	1966	1970
Abingdon		Conservative	Conservative	Conservative	Conservative	Conservative	Conservative	Conservative
Newbury		Conservative	Conservative	Conservative	Conservative	Conservative	Conservative	Conservative
Reading North	Reading (from 1955)	Labour	Conservative	Labour	Conservative	Conservative	Labour	Conservative
Reading South	Reading (from 1955)	Labour	Labour	Labour	Conservative	Conservative	Labour	Conservative
Windsor		Conservative	Conservative	Conservative	Conservative	Conservative	Conservative	Conservative
Wokingham		Conservative	Conservative	Conservative	Conservative	Conservative	Conservative	Conservative

=== Hampshire (13 then 14) ===
Constituency	1950	1951	1955	1959	1964	1966	1970
Aldershot	Conservative	Conservative	Conservative	Conservative	Conservative	Conservative	Conservative
Basingstoke	Conservative	Conservative	Conservative	Conservative	Conservative	Conservative	Conservative
Bournemouth East and Christchurch	Conservative	Conservative	Conservative	Conservative	Conservative	Conservative	Conservative
Bournemouth West	Conservative	Conservative	Conservative	Conservative	Conservative	Conservative	Conservative
Eastleigh	N/A		Conservative	Conservative	Conservative	Conservative	Conservative
Gosport and Fareham	Conservative	Conservative	Conservative	Conservative	Conservative	Conservative	Conservative
New Forest	Conservative	Conservative	Conservative	Conservative	Conservative	Conservative	Conservative
Petersfield	Conservative	Conservative	Conservative	Conservative	Conservative	Conservative	Conservative
Portsmouth Langstone	Conservative	Conservative	Conservative	Conservative	Conservative	Conservative	Conservative
Portsmouth South	Conservative	Conservative	Conservative	Conservative	Conservative	Conservative	Conservative
Portsmouth West	Conservative	Conservative	Conservative	Conservative	Conservative	Labour	Labour
Southampton Itchen	Labour	Labour	Labour	Labour	Labour	Speaker (Lab)	Speaker (Lab)
Southampton Test	Labour	Labour	Conservative	Conservative	Conservative	Labour	Conservative
Winchester	Conservative	Conservative	Conservative	Conservative	Conservative	Conservative	Conservative

=== Isle of Wight (1) ===
Constituency	1950	1951	1955	1959	1964	1966	1970
Isle of Wight	Conservative	Conservative	Conservative	Conservative	Conservative	Conservative	Conservative

=== Surrey (19 then 20) ===
Constituency	1950	1951	1955	1959	1964	1966	1970	
Carshalton	Conservative	Conservative	Conservative	Conservative	Conservative	Conservative	Conservative	Transferred to Greater London 1965
Chertsey	Conservative	Conservative	Conservative	Conservative	Conservative	Conservative	Conservative	
Croydon East / Croydon North East (from 1955)	Conservative	Conservative	Conservative	Conservative	Conservative	Conservative	Conservative	Transferred to Greater London 1965
Croydon North / Croydon North West (from 1955)	Conservative	Conservative	Conservative	Conservative	Conservative	Conservative	Conservative	Transferred to Greater London 1965
Croydon West / Croydon South (from 1955)	Conservative	Conservative	Conservative	Conservative	Conservative	Labour	Conservative	Transferred to Greater London 1965
Dorking	Conservative	Conservative	Conservative	Conservative	Conservative	Conservative	Conservative	
Epsom	Conservative	Conservative	Conservative	Conservative	Conservative	Conservative	Conservative	
Esher	Conservative	Conservative	Conservative	Conservative	Conservative	Conservative	Conservative	
Farnham	Conservative	Conservative	Conservative	Conservative	Conservative	Conservative	Conservative	
Guildford	Conservative	Conservative	Conservative	Conservative	Conservative	Conservative	Conservative	
Kingston upon Thames	Conservative	Conservative	Conservative	Conservative	Conservative	Conservative	Conservative	Transferred to Greater London 1965
Merton and Morden	Conservative	Conservative	Conservative	Conservative	Conservative	Conservative	Conservative	Transferred to Greater London 1965
Mitcham	Conservative	Conservative	Conservative	Conservative	Conservative	Conservative	Conservative	Transferred to Greater London 1965
Reigate	Conservative	Conservative	Conservative	Conservative	Conservative	Conservative	Conservative	
Richmond (Surrey)	Conservative	Conservative	Conservative	Conservative	Conservative	Conservative	Conservative	Transferred to Greater London 1965
Surbiton	N/A		Conservative	Conservative	Conservative	Conservative	Conservative	Transferred to Greater London 1965
Surrey East	Conservative	Conservative	Conservative	Conservative	Conservative	Conservative	Conservative	
Sutton and Cheam	Conservative	Conservative	Conservative	Conservative	Conservative	Conservative	Conservative	Transferred to Greater London 1965
Wimbledon	Conservative	Conservative	Conservative	Conservative	Conservative	Conservative	Conservative	Transferred to Greater London 1965
Woking	Conservative	Conservative	Conservative	Conservative	Conservative	Conservative	Conservative	

=== Sussex (11 then 12) ===
Constituency	1950	1951	1955	1959	1964	1966	1970
Arundel and Shoreham	Conservative	Conservative	Conservative	Conservative	Conservative	Conservative	Conservative
Brighton Kemptown	Conservative	Conservative	Conservative	Conservative	Labour	Labour	Conservative
Brighton Pavilion	Conservative	Conservative	Conservative	Conservative	Conservative	Conservative	Conservative
Chichester	Conservative	Conservative	Conservative	Conservative	Conservative	Conservative	Conservative
Eastbourne	Conservative	Conservative	Conservative	Conservative	Conservative	Conservative	Conservative
East Grinstead	Conservative	Conservative	Conservative	Conservative	Conservative	Conservative	Conservative
Hastings	Conservative	Conservative	Conservative	Conservative	Conservative	Conservative	Conservative
Horsham	Conservative	Conservative	Conservative	Conservative	Conservative	Conservative	Conservative
Hove	Conservative	Conservative	Conservative	Conservative	Conservative	Conservative	Conservative
Lewes	Conservative	Conservative	Conservative	Conservative	Conservative	Conservative	Conservative
Rye	N/A		Conservative	Conservative	Conservative	Conservative	Conservative
Worthing	Conservative	Conservative	Conservative	Conservative	Conservative	Conservative	Conservative

=== Kent (18 then 19) ===
Constituency	1950	1951	1955	1959	1964	1966	1970	
Ashford	Conservative	Conservative	Conservative	Conservative	Conservative	Conservative	Conservative	
Beckenham	Conservative	Conservative	Conservative	Conservative	Conservative	Conservative	Conservative	Transferred to Greater London 1965
Bexley	Conservative	Conservative	Conservative	Conservative	Conservative	Conservative	Conservative	Transferred to Greater London 1965
Bromley	Conservative	Conservative	Conservative	Conservative	Conservative	Conservative	Conservative	Transferred to Greater London 1965
Canterbury	Conservative	Conservative	Conservative	Conservative	Conservative	Conservative	Conservative	
Chislehurst	Conservative	Conservative	Conservative	Conservative	Conservative	Labour	Conservative	Transferred to Greater London 1965
Dartford	Labour Co-op	Labour Co-op	Labour Co-op	Labour Co-op	Labour Co-op	Labour Co-op	Conservative	
Dover	Conservative	Conservative	Conservative	Conservative	Labour	Labour	Conservative	
Erith and Crayford	N/A		Labour Co-op	Labour Co-op	Labour Co-op	Labour	Labour	Transferred to Greater London 1965
Faversham	Labour	Labour	Labour	Labour	Labour	Labour	Conservative	
Folkestone and Hythe	Conservative	Conservative	Conservative	Conservative	Conservative	Conservative	Conservative	
Gillingham	Conservative	Conservative	Conservative	Conservative	Conservative	Conservative	Conservative	
Gravesend	Labour	Labour	Conservative	Conservative	Labour	Labour	Conservative	
Isle of Thanet	Conservative	Conservative	Conservative	Conservative	Conservative	Conservative	Conservative	
Maidstone	Conservative	Conservative	Conservative	Conservative	Conservative	Conservative	Conservative	
Orpington	Conservative	Conservative	Conservative	Conservative	Liberal	Liberal	Conservative	Transferred to Greater London 1965
Rochester and Chatham	Labour	Labour	Labour	Conservative	Labour	Labour	Conservative	
Sevenoaks	Conservative	Conservative	Conservative	Conservative	Conservative	Conservative	Conservative	
Tonbridge	Conservative	Conservative	Conservative	Conservative	Conservative	Conservative	Conservative	

=== Middlesex (28 then 29) ===
With the exception of Spelthorne, which became part of Surrey, all of these constituencies became part of the county of Greater London when it was formed and Middlesex was abolished in 1965.

Constituency	1950	1951	1955	1959	1964	1966	1970
Acton	Labour	Labour	Labour	Conservative	Labour	Labour	Labour
Brentford and Chiswick	Conservative	Conservative	Conservative	Conservative	Conservative	Labour	Labour
Ealing North	Labour Co-op	Labour Co-op	Conservative	Conservative	Labour	Labour	Labour
Ealing South	Conservative	Conservative	Conservative	Conservative	Conservative	Conservative	Conservative
Edmonton	Labour	Labour	Labour	Labour	Labour	Labour	Labour
Enfield East	Labour	Labour	Labour	Labour	Labour	Labour	Labour
Enfield West	Conservative	Conservative	Conservative	Conservative	Conservative	Conservative	Conservative
Feltham	N/A		Labour	Labour	Labour	Labour	Labour
Finchley	Conservative	Conservative	Conservative	Conservative	Conservative	Conservative	Conservative
Harrow Central	Conservative	Conservative	Conservative	Conservative	Conservative	Conservative	Conservative
Harrow East	Conservative	Conservative	Conservative	Conservative	Conservative	Labour	Conservative
Harrow West	Conservative	Conservative	Conservative	Conservative	Conservative	Conservative	Conservative
Hayes and Harlington	Labour	Labour	Labour	Labour	Labour	Labour	Labour
Hendon North	Conservative	Conservative	Conservative	Conservative	Conservative	Conservative	Conservative
Hendon South	Conservative	Conservative	Conservative	Conservative	Conservative	Conservative	Conservative
Heston and Isleworth	Conservative	Conservative	Conservative	Conservative	Conservative	Conservative	Conservative
Hornsey	Conservative	Conservative	Conservative	Conservative	Conservative	Conservative	Conservative
Ruislip Northwood	Conservative	Conservative	Conservative	Conservative	Conservative	Conservative	Conservative
Southall	Labour	Labour	Labour	Labour	Labour	Labour	Labour
Southgate	Conservative	Conservative	Conservative	Conservative	Conservative	Conservative	Conservative
Spelthorne	Conservative	Conservative	Conservative	Conservative	Conservative	Conservative	Conservative
Tottenham	Labour Co-op	Labour Co-op	Labour Co-op	Labour	Labour	Labour	Labour
Twickenham	Conservative	Conservative	Conservative	Conservative	Conservative	Conservative	Conservative
Uxbridge	Labour Co-op	Labour Co-op	Labour Co-op	Conservative	Conservative	Labour	Conservative
Wembley North	Conservative	Conservative	Conservative	Conservative	Conservative	Conservative	Conservative
Wembley South	Conservative	Conservative	Conservative	Conservative	Conservative	Conservative	Conservative
Willesden East	Labour	Labour	Conservative	Conservative	Labour	Labour	Labour
Willesden West	Labour	Labour	Labour	Labour Co-op	Labour Co-op	Labour Co-op	Labour Co-op
Wood Green	Labour Co-op	Labour Co-op	Labour Co-op	Labour Co-op	Labour Co-op	Labour Co-op	Labour Co-op

=== County of London (43 then 42) ===
The county of London was abolished in 1965 and became part of the much larger county of Greater London.

Constituency		1950	1951	1955	1959	1964	1966	1970
Battersea North		Labour	Labour	Labour	Labour	Labour	Labour	Labour
Battersea South		Labour Co-op	Conservative	Conservative	Conservative	Labour	Labour	Labour
Bermondsey		Labour	Labour	Labour	Labour	Labour	Labour	Labour
Bethnal Green		Labour Co-op	Labour Co-op	Labour Co-op	Labour Co-op	Labour Co-op	Labour Co-op	Labour Co-op
Brixton		Labour	Labour	Labour	Labour	Labour	Labour	Labour
Chelsea		Conservative	Conservative	Conservative	Conservative	Conservative	Conservative	Conservative
Clapham		Labour	Labour	Labour	Conservative	Labour	Labour	Conservative
Deptford		Labour	Labour	Labour	Labour	Labour	Labour	Labour
Dulwich		Labour	Conservative	Conservative	Conservative	Labour	Labour	Labour
Fulham East	Fulham (from 1955)	Labour	Labour	Labour	Labour	Labour	Labour	Labour
Fulham West	Fulham (from 1955)	Labour	Labour	Labour	Labour	Labour	Labour	Labour
Greenwich		Labour	Labour	Labour	Labour	Labour	Labour	Labour
Hackney North and Stoke Newington		Labour	Labour	Labour	Labour	Labour	Labour	Labour
Hackney South / Hackney Central (from 1955)		Labour	Labour	Labour	Labour	Labour	Labour	Labour
Hammersmith North		Labour	Labour	Labour	Labour	Labour	Labour	Labour
Hammersmith South / Barons Court (from 1955)		Labour Co-op	Labour Co-op	Labour Co-op	Conservative	Labour	Labour	Labour
Hampstead		Conservative	Conservative	Conservative	Conservative	Conservative	Labour	Conservative
Holborn and St Pancras South		Labour	Labour	Labour	Conservative	Labour	Labour	Labour
Islington East		Labour	Labour	Labour	Labour	Labour	Labour	Labour
Islington North		Labour	Labour	Labour	Labour	Labour	Labour	Labour
Islington South West		Labour	Labour	Labour	Labour	Labour	Labour	Labour
Kensington North		Labour	Labour	Labour	Labour	Labour	Labour	Labour
Kensington South		Conservative	Conservative	Conservative	Conservative	Conservative	Conservative	Conservative
Lewisham North		Conservative	Conservative	Conservative	Conservative	Conservative	Labour	Labour
Lewisham South		Labour	Labour	Labour	Labour	Labour	Labour	Labour
Lewisham West		Conservative	Conservative	Conservative	Conservative	Conservative	Labour	Conservative
Cities of London and Westminster		Conservative	Conservative	Conservative	Conservative	Speaker (Con)	Conservative	Conservative
Norwood		Conservative	Conservative	Conservative	Conservative	Conservative	Labour	Labour
Paddington North		Labour	Labour	Labour	Labour	Labour	Labour	Labour
Paddington South		Conservative	Conservative	Conservative	Conservative	Conservative	Conservative	Conservative
Peckham		Labour	Labour	Labour	Labour	Labour	Labour	Labour
Poplar		Labour	Labour	Labour	Labour	Labour	Labour	Labour
Putney		Conservative	Conservative	Conservative	Conservative	Labour	Labour	Labour
St Marylebone		Conservative	Conservative	Conservative	Conservative	Conservative	Conservative	Conservative
St Pancras North		Labour	Labour	Labour	Labour	Labour	Labour	Labour
Shoreditch and Finsbury		Labour	Labour	Labour	Labour	Labour	Labour	Labour
Southwark		Labour	Labour	Labour	Labour	Labour	Labour	Labour
Stepney		Labour	Labour	Labour	Labour	Labour	Labour	Labour
Streatham		Conservative	Conservative	Conservative	Conservative	Conservative	Conservative	Conservative
Vauxhall		Labour	Labour	Labour	Labour	Labour	Labour	Labour
Wandsworth Central		Labour	Labour	Conservative	Conservative	Labour	Labour	Labour
Woolwich East		Labour	Labour	Labour	Labour	Labour	Labour	Labour
Woolwich West		Conservative	Conservative	Conservative	Conservative	Labour	Labour	Labour

See https://commons.wikimedia.org/wiki/Category:Locator_maps_of_former_parliamentary_constituencies_of_England_1948

== East Anglia (52 to 1955; 55 from 1955) ==
=== Bedfordshire (4) ===
Constituency	1950	1951	1955	1959	1964	1966	1970
Bedford	Conservative	Conservative	Conservative	Conservative	Conservative	Labour	Conservative
Bedfordshire Mid	Conservative	Conservative	Conservative	Conservative	Conservative	Conservative	Conservative
Bedfordshire South	Labour	National Liberal	National Liberal	National Liberal	Conservative	Labour	Conservative
Luton	National Liberal	National Liberal	National Liberal	National Liberal	Labour	Labour	Conservative

=== Hertfordshire (7 then 8) ===
Constituency	1950	1951	1955	1959	1964	1966	1970	
Barnet	Conservative	Conservative	Conservative	Conservative	Conservative	Conservative	Conservative	Transferred to Greater London 1965
Hemel Hempstead	Conservative	Conservative	Conservative	Conservative	Conservative	Conservative	Conservative	
Hertford	Conservative	Conservative	Conservative	Conservative	Conservative	Conservative	Conservative	
Hertfordshire East	N/A		Conservative	Conservative	Conservative	Conservative	Conservative	
Hertfordshire South West	Conservative	Conservative	Conservative	Conservative	Conservative	Conservative	Conservative	
Hitchin	Conservative	Conservative	Conservative	Conservative	Labour	Labour	Labour	
St Albans	Conservative	Conservative	Conservative	Conservative	Conservative	Conservative	Conservative	
Watford	Labour	Labour	Conservative	Conservative	Labour	Labour	Labour	

=== Huntingdonshire (1) ===
Constituency	1950	1951	1955	1959	1964	1966	1970
Huntingdonshire	National Liberal	National Liberal	National Liberal	National Liberal	National Liberal	National Liberal	Conservative

=== Cambridgeshire and Isle of Ely (3) ===
The separate administrative counties of Cambridgeshire and Isle of Ely were combined in 1965.

Constituency	1950	1951	1955	1959	1964	1966	1970
Cambridge	Conservative	Conservative	Conservative	Conservative	Conservative	Labour	Conservative
Cambridgeshire	Conservative	Conservative	Conservative	Conservative	Conservative	Conservative	Conservative
Isle of Ely	Conservative	Conservative	Conservative	Conservative	Conservative	Conservative	Conservative

=== Norfolk (8) ===
Constituency	1950	1951	1955	1959	1964	1966	1970
King's Lynn	Labour	Conservative	Conservative	Conservative	Labour	Labour	Conservative
Norfolk Central	National Liberal	National Liberal	National Liberal	National Liberal	Conservative	Conservative	Conservative
Norfolk North	Labour	Labour	Labour	Labour	Labour	Labour	Conservative
Norfolk South	Conservative	Conservative	Conservative	Conservative	Conservative	Conservative	Conservative
Norfolk South West	Labour	Conservative	Labour	Labour	Conservative	Conservative	Conservative
Norwich North	Labour	Labour	Labour	Labour	Labour	Labour	Labour
Norwich South	Conservative	Conservative	Conservative	Conservative	Labour	Labour	Conservative
Yarmouth	Labour	Conservative	Conservative	Conservative	Conservative	Labour	Conservative

=== Suffolk (5) ===
Constituency	1950	1951	1955	1959	1964	1966	1970
Bury St Edmunds	Conservative	Conservative	Conservative	Conservative	Conservative	Conservative	Conservative
Eye	Liberal	Conservative	Conservative	Conservative	Conservative	Conservative	Conservative
Ipswich	Labour	Labour	Labour	Labour	Labour	Labour	Conservative
Lowestoft	Labour	Labour	Labour	Conservative	Conservative	Conservative	Conservative
Sudbury and Woodbridge	Conservative	Conservative	Conservative	Conservative	Conservative	Conservative	Conservative

=== Essex (24 then 26) ===
Constituency	1950	1951	1955	1959	1964	1966	1970	
Barking	Labour	Labour	Labour	Labour	Labour	Labour	Labour	Transferred to Greater London 1965
Billericay	Conservative	Conservative	Conservative	Conservative	Conservative	Labour	Conservative	
Chelmsford	Conservative	Conservative	Conservative	Conservative	Conservative	Conservative	Conservative	
Chigwell	N/A		Conservative	Conservative	Conservative	Conservative	Conservative	
Colchester	Conservative	Conservative	Conservative	Conservative	Conservative	Conservative	Conservative	
Dagenham	Labour	Labour	Labour	Labour	Labour	Labour	Labour	Transferred to Greater London 1965
East Ham North	Labour Co-op	Labour Co-op	Labour Co-op	Labour	Labour	Labour	Labour	Transferred to Greater London 1965
East Ham South	Labour Co-op	Labour Co-op	Labour Co-op	Labour Co-op	Labour Co-op	Labour Co-op	Labour Co-op	Transferred to Greater London 1965
Epping	Conservative	Conservative	Conservative	Conservative	Labour	Labour	Conservative	Part transferred to Greater London 1965
Essex South East	N/A		Conservative	Conservative	Conservative	Conservative	Conservative	
Harwich	National Liberal	National Liberal	National Liberal	National Liberal	National Liberal	National Liberal	Conservative	
Hornchurch	Labour	Labour	Conservative	Conservative	Conservative	Labour	Conservative	Transferred to Greater London 1965
Ilford North	Conservative	Conservative	Conservative	Conservative	Conservative	Conservative	Conservative	Transferred to Greater London 1965
Ilford South	Conservative	Conservative	Conservative	Conservative	Conservative	Labour	Conservative	Transferred to Greater London 1965
Leyton	Labour	Labour	Labour	Labour	Labour	Labour	Labour	Transferred to Greater London 1965
Maldon	Labour	Labour	Conservative	Conservative	Conservative	Conservative	Conservative	
Romford	Conservative	Conservative	Labour Co-op	Labour Co-op	Labour Co-op	Labour Co-op	Labour	Transferred to Greater London 1965
Saffron Walden	Conservative	Conservative	Conservative	Conservative	Conservative	Conservative	Conservative	
Southend East	Conservative	Conservative	Conservative	Conservative	Conservative	Conservative	Conservative	
Southend West	Conservative	Conservative	Conservative	Conservative	Conservative	Conservative	Conservative	
Thurrock	Labour	Labour	Labour	Labour	Labour	Labour	Labour	
Walthamstow East	Labour	Labour	Conservative	Conservative	Conservative	Labour	Conservative	Transferred to Greater London 1965
Walthamstow West	Labour	Labour	Labour	Labour	Labour	Labour	Labour	Transferred to Greater London 1965
Woodford / Wanstead and Woodford (from 1964)	Conservative	Conservative	Conservative	Conservative	Conservative	Conservative	Conservative	Transferred to Greater London 1965
West Ham North	Labour	Labour	Labour	Labour	Labour	Labour	Labour	Transferred to Greater London 1965
West Ham South	Labour	Labour	Labour	Labour	Labour	Labour	Labour	Transferred to Greater London 1965

== East Midlands (42) ==
=== Derbyshire (10) ===
Constituency	1950	1951	1955	1959	1964	1966	1970
Belper	Labour	Labour	Labour	Labour	Labour	Labour	Conservative
Bolsover	Labour	Labour	Labour	Labour	Labour	Labour	Labour
Chesterfield	Labour	Labour	Labour	Labour	Labour	Labour	Labour
Derby North	Labour	Labour	Labour	Labour	Labour	Labour	Labour
Derby South	Labour	Labour	Labour	Labour	Labour	Labour	Labour
Derbyshire North East	Labour	Labour	Labour	Labour	Labour	Labour	Labour
Derbyshire South East	Labour	Labour	Labour	Conservative	Labour	Labour	Conservative
Derbyshire West	Conservative	Conservative	Conservative	Conservative	Conservative	Conservative	Conservative
High Peak	Conservative	Conservative	Conservative	Conservative	Conservative	Labour	Conservative
Ilkeston	Labour	Labour	Labour	Labour	Labour	Labour	Labour

=== Nottinghamshire (10) ===
Constituency	1950	1951	1955	1959	1964	1966	1970
Bassetlaw	Labour	Labour	Labour	Labour	Labour	Labour	Labour
Broxtowe / Ashfield (from 1955)	Labour	Labour	Labour	Labour	Labour	Labour	Labour
Carlton	Conservative	Conservative	Conservative	Conservative	Conservative	Conservative	Conservative
Mansfield	Labour	Labour	Labour	Labour	Labour	Labour	Labour
Newark	Labour	Labour	Labour	Labour	Labour	Labour	Labour
Nottingham Central	Labour	Labour	Conservative	Conservative	Labour	Labour	Labour
Nottingham East / Nottingham North (from 1955)	Labour	Labour	Labour	Labour	Labour	Labour	Labour
Nottingham North West / Nottingham West (from 1955)	Labour	Labour	Labour	Conservative	Labour	Labour	Labour
Nottingham South	Labour Co-op	Labour Co-op	Conservative	Conservative	Conservative	Labour	Conservative
Rushcliffe	Conservative	Conservative	Conservative	Conservative	Conservative	Labour	Conservative

=== Leicestershire (8) ===
Constituency	1950	1951	1955	1959	1964	1966	1970
Bosworth	Labour	Labour	Labour	Labour	Labour	Labour	Conservative
Harborough	Conservative	Conservative	Conservative	Conservative	Conservative	Conservative	Conservative
Leicester North East	Labour	Labour	Labour	Labour	Labour	Labour	Labour
Leicester North West	Labour	Labour	Labour	Labour	Labour	Labour	Labour
Leicester South East	Conservative	Conservative	Conservative	Conservative	Conservative	Conservative	Conservative
Leicester South West	Labour	Labour	Labour	Labour	Labour	Labour	Conservative
Loughborough	Labour	Labour	Labour	Labour	Labour	Labour	Labour
Melton	Conservative	Conservative	Conservative	Conservative	Conservative	Conservative	Conservative

=== Lincolnshire and Rutland (9) ===
Constituency	1950	1951	1955	1959	1964	1966	1970
Brigg	Labour	Labour	Labour	Labour	Labour	Labour	Labour
Gainsborough	Conservative	Conservative	Conservative	Conservative	Conservative	Conservative	Conservative
Grantham	Conservative	Conservative	Conservative	Conservative	Conservative	Conservative	Conservative
Grimsby	Labour	Labour	Labour	Labour	Labour	Labour	Labour
Holland with Boston	National Liberal	National Liberal	National Liberal	National Liberal	National Liberal	Conservative	Conservative
Horncastle	Conservative	Conservative	Conservative	Conservative	Conservative	Conservative	Conservative
Lincoln	Labour	Labour	Labour	Labour	Labour	Labour	Labour
Louth	Conservative	Conservative	Conservative	Conservative	Conservative	Conservative	Conservative
Rutland and Stamford	Conservative	Conservative	Conservative	Conservative	Conservative	Conservative	Conservative

=== Northamptonshire and Soke of Peterborough (5) ===
The administrative county of the Soke of Peterborough was combined with Huntingdonshire in 1965 to form Huntingdonshire and Peterborough.

Constituency	1950	1951	1955	1959	1964	1966	1970
Kettering	Labour	Labour	Labour	Labour	Labour	Labour	Labour
Northampton	Labour	Labour	Labour	Labour	Labour	Labour	Labour
Northamptonshire South	Conservative	Conservative	Conservative	Conservative	Conservative	Conservative	Conservative
Peterborough	Conservative	Conservative	Conservative	Conservative	Conservative	Conservative	Conservative
Wellingborough	Labour	Labour	Labour	Conservative	Labour	Labour	Conservative

== West Midlands (52 to 1955; 54 from 1955) ==
=== Shropshire (4) ===
Constituency	1950	1951	1955	1959	1964	1966	1970
Ludlow	Conservative	Conservative	Conservative	Conservative	Conservative	Conservative	Conservative
Oswestry	Conservative	Conservative	Conservative	Conservative	Conservative	Conservative	Conservative
Shrewsbury	Conservative	Conservative	Conservative	Conservative	Conservative	Conservative	Conservative
The Wrekin	Labour	Labour	Conservative	Conservative	Conservative	Labour	Conservative

=== Staffordshire (17 then 18) ===
Constituency		1950	1951	1955	1959	1964	1966	1970
Bilston		Labour Co-op	Labour Co-op	Labour Co-op	Labour Co-op	Labour Co-op	Labour Co-op	Labour Co-op
Brierley Hill		Labour	Labour	Labour	Conservative	Conservative	Conservative	Conservative
Burton		Conservative	Conservative	Conservative	Conservative	Conservative	Conservative	Conservative
Cannock		Labour	Labour	Labour	Labour	Labour	Labour	Conservative
Leek		Labour	Labour	Labour	Labour	Labour	Labour	Conservative
Lichfield and Tamworth		Labour	Labour	Labour	Labour	Labour	Labour	Conservative
Newcastle-under-Lyme		Labour	Labour	Labour	Labour	Labour	Labour	Labour
Smethwick		Labour	Labour	Labour	Labour	Conservative	Labour	Labour
Stafford and Stone		Conservative	Conservative	Conservative	Conservative	Conservative	Conservative	Conservative
Stoke-on-Trent Central		Labour	Labour	Labour	Labour	Labour	Labour	Labour
Stoke-on-Trent North		Labour	Labour	Labour Co-op	Labour Co-op	Labour Co-op	Labour	Labour
Stoke-on-Trent South		Labour	Labour	Labour	Labour	Labour	Labour	Labour
Walsall	Walsall North (from 1955)	Labour	Labour	Labour	Labour	Labour	Labour	Labour
Walsall	Walsall South (from 1955)	Labour	Labour	Conservative	Conservative	Conservative	Conservative	Conservative
Wednesbury		Labour	Labour	Labour	Labour Co-op	Labour Co-op	Labour Co-op	Labour Co-op
West Bromwich		Labour	Labour	Labour	Labour	Labour	Labour	Labour
Wolverhampton North East		Labour	Labour	Labour	Labour	Labour	Labour	Labour
Wolverhampton South West		Conservative	Conservative	Conservative	Conservative	Conservative	Conservative	Conservative

=== Herefordshire (2) ===
Constituency	1950	1951	1955	1959	1964	1966	1970
Hereford	Conservative	Conservative	Conservative	Conservative	Conservative	Conservative	Conservative
Leominster	Conservative	Conservative	Conservative	Conservative	Conservative	Conservative	Conservative

=== Worcestershire (7) ===
Constituency	1950	1951	1955	1959	1964	1966	1970
Bromsgrove	Conservative	Conservative	Conservative	Conservative	Conservative	Conservative	Conservative
Dudley	Labour	Labour	Labour	Labour	Labour	Labour	Labour
Kidderminster	Conservative	Conservative	Conservative	Conservative	Conservative	Conservative	Conservative
Oldbury and Halesowen	Labour	Labour	Labour	Labour	Labour	Labour	Conservative
Rowley Regis and Tipton	Labour	Labour	Labour	Labour	Labour	Labour	Labour
Worcester	Conservative	Conservative	Conservative	Conservative	Conservative	Conservative	Conservative
Worcestershire South	Conservative	Conservative	Conservative	Conservative	Conservative	Conservative	Conservative

=== Warwickshire (22 then 23) ===
Constituency	1950	1951	1955	1959	1964	1966	1970
Birmingham All Saints	N/A		Labour	Conservative	Labour	Labour	Labour
Birmingham Aston	Labour	Labour	Labour	Labour	Labour	Labour	Labour
Birmingham Edgbaston	Conservative	Conservative	Conservative	Conservative	Conservative	Conservative	Conservative
Birmingham Erdington	Labour	Labour	N/A				
Birmingham Hall Green	Conservative	Conservative	Conservative	Conservative	Conservative	Conservative	Conservative
Birmingham Handsworth	Conservative	Conservative	Conservative	Conservative	Conservative	Conservative	Conservative
Birmingham King's Norton	Conservative	Conservative	N/A				
Birmingham Ladywood	Labour	Labour	Labour	Labour	Labour	Labour	Labour
Birmingham Northfield	Labour	Labour	Labour	Labour	Labour	Labour	Labour
Birmingham Perry Barr	Labour	Labour	Labour	Labour	Conservative	Labour	Conservative
Birmingham Selly Oak	N/A		Conservative	Conservative	Conservative	Conservative	Conservative
Birmingham Small Heath	Labour Co-op	Labour Co-op	Labour Co-op	Labour Co-op	Labour	Labour	Labour
Birmingham Sparkbrook	Labour	Labour	Labour	Conservative	Labour	Labour	Labour
Birmingham Stechford	Labour	Labour	Labour	Labour	Labour	Labour	Labour
Birmingham Yardley	Labour	Labour	Labour	Conservative	Labour Co-op	Labour Co-op	Conservative
Coventry East	Labour	Labour	Labour	Labour	Labour	Labour	Labour
Coventry North	Labour	Labour	Labour	Labour	Labour	Labour	Labour
Coventry South	Labour	Labour	Labour	Conservative	Labour	Labour	Labour
Meriden	N/A		Labour	Conservative	Labour	Labour	Conservative
Nuneaton	Labour	Labour	Labour	Labour	Labour	Labour	Labour
Rugby	Labour	Labour	Labour	Conservative	Conservative	Labour	Labour
Solihull	Conservative	Conservative	Conservative	Conservative	Conservative	Conservative	Conservative
Stratford-on-Avon	Conservative	Conservative	Conservative	Conservative	Conservative	Conservative	Conservative
Sutton Coldfield	Conservative	Conservative	Conservative	Conservative	Conservative	Conservative	Conservative
Warwick and Leamington	Conservative	Conservative	Conservative	Conservative	Conservative	Conservative	Conservative

== North West (84 to 1955; 83 from 1955) ==
=== Cumberland (4) ===
Constituency	1950	1951	1955	1959	1964	1966	1970
Carlisle	Labour	Labour	Conservative	Conservative	Labour	Labour	Labour
Penrith and the Border	Conservative	Conservative	Conservative	Conservative	Conservative	Conservative	Conservative
Whitehaven	Labour	Labour	Labour	Labour	Labour	Labour	Labour
Workington	Labour	Labour	Labour	Labour	Labour	Labour	Labour

=== Westmorland (1) ===
Constituency	1950	1951	1955	1959	1964	1966	1970
Westmorland	Conservative	Conservative	Conservative	Conservative	Conservative	Conservative	Conservative

=== Lancashire (64 then 62) ===
Constituency		1950	1951	1955	1959	1964	1966	1970
Accrington		Labour	Labour	Labour	Labour	Labour	Labour	Labour
Ashton-under-Lyne		Labour	Labour	Labour	Labour	Labour	Labour	Labour
Barrow-in-Furness		Labour	Labour	Labour	Labour	Labour	Labour	Labour
Blackburn East	Blackburn (from 1955)	Labour	Labour	Labour	Labour	Labour	Labour	Labour
Blackburn West	Blackburn (from 1955)	Conservative	Conservative	Labour	Labour	Labour	Labour	Labour
Blackpool North		Conservative	Conservative	Conservative	Conservative	Conservative	Conservative	Conservative
Blackpool South		Conservative	Conservative	Conservative	Conservative	Conservative	Conservative	Conservative
Bolton East		Labour	Conservative	Conservative	Conservative	Labour	Labour	Conservative
Bolton West		Labour	Liberal	Liberal	Liberal	Labour	Labour	Conservative
Bootle		Labour	Labour	Labour	Labour	Labour	Labour	Labour
Burnley		Labour	Labour	Labour	Labour	Labour	Labour	Labour
Bury and Radcliffe		Conservative	Conservative	Conservative	Conservative	Labour	Labour	Conservative
Chorley		Labour	Labour	Labour	Labour	Labour	Labour	Conservative
Clitheroe		Conservative	Conservative	Conservative	Conservative	Conservative	Conservative	Conservative
Crosby		Conservative	Conservative	Conservative	Conservative	Conservative	Conservative	Conservative
Darwen		Conservative	Conservative	Conservative	Conservative	Conservative	Conservative	Conservative
Droylsden		Labour Co-op	Labour	N/A				
Eccles		Labour	Labour	Labour	Labour	Labour	Labour	Labour
Farnworth		Labour	Labour	Labour	Labour	Labour	Labour	Labour Co-op
Fylde North		Conservative	Conservative	Conservative	Conservative	Conservative	Conservative	Conservative
Fylde South		Conservative	Conservative	Conservative	Conservative	Conservative	Conservative	Conservative
Heywood and Royton		Conservative	Conservative	Conservative	Conservative	Labour	Labour	Labour
Huyton		Labour	Labour	Labour	Labour	Labour	Labour	Labour
Ince		Labour	Labour	Labour	Labour	Labour	Labour	Labour
Lancaster		Conservative	Conservative	Conservative	Conservative	Conservative	Labour	Conservative
Leigh		Labour	Labour	Labour	Labour	Labour	Labour	Labour
Liverpool Edge Hill		Labour	Labour	Labour	Labour	Labour	Labour	Labour
Liverpool Exchange		Labour	Labour	Labour	Labour	Labour	Labour	Labour
Liverpool Garston		Conservative	Conservative	Conservative	Conservative	Conservative	Conservative	Conservative
Liverpool Kirkdale		Labour	Labour	Conservative	Conservative	Labour	Labour	Labour
Liverpool Scotland		Labour	Labour	Labour	Labour	Labour	Labour	Labour
Liverpool Toxteth		Conservative	Conservative	Conservative	Conservative	Labour	Labour	Labour
Liverpool Walton		Conservative	Conservative	Conservative	Conservative	Labour	Labour	Labour
Liverpool Wavertree		Conservative	Conservative	Conservative	Conservative	Conservative	Conservative	Conservative
Liverpool West Derby		Conservative	Conservative	Conservative	Conservative	Labour	Labour	Labour
Manchester Ardwick		Labour	Labour	Labour	Labour	Labour	Labour	Labour
Manchester Blackley		Labour	Conservative	Conservative	Conservative	Labour	Labour	Labour
Manchester Cheetham		Labour	Labour	Labour	Labour	Labour	Labour	Labour
Manchester Clayton / Manchester Openshaw (from 1955)		Labour	Labour	Labour	Labour	Labour	Labour	Labour
Manchester Exchange		Labour	Labour	Labour	Labour	Labour	Labour	Labour
Manchester Gorton		Labour	Labour	Labour	Labour	Labour	Labour	Labour
Manchester Moss Side		Conservative	Conservative	Conservative	Conservative	Conservative	Conservative	Conservative
Manchester Withington		Conservative	Conservative	Conservative	Conservative	Conservative	Conservative	Conservative
Manchester Wythenshawe		Conservative	Conservative	Conservative	Conservative	Labour Co-op	Labour Co-op	Labour Co-op
Middleton and Prestwich		Conservative	Conservative	Conservative	Conservative	Conservative	Labour	Conservative
Morecambe and Lonsdale		Conservative	Conservative	Conservative	Conservative	Conservative	Conservative	Conservative
Nelson and Colne		Labour	Labour	Labour	Labour	Labour	Labour	Conservative
Newton		Labour	Labour	Labour	Labour	Labour	Labour	Labour
Oldham East		Labour	Conservative	Conservative	Labour	Labour	Labour	Labour
Oldham West		Labour	Labour	Labour	Labour	Labour	Labour	Labour
Ormskirk		Conservative	Conservative	Conservative	Conservative	Conservative	Conservative	Conservative
Preston North		Conservative	Conservative	Conservative	Conservative	Conservative	Labour	Conservative
Preston South		Labour	Labour	Conservative	Conservative	Labour	Labour	Conservative
Rochdale		Labour	Conservative	Conservative	Labour	Labour	Labour	Labour
Rossendale		Labour	Labour	Labour	Labour	Labour	Labour	Conservative
St Helens		Labour	Labour	Labour	Labour	Labour	Labour	Labour
Salford East		Labour	Labour	Labour	Labour	Labour	Labour	Labour
Salford West		Labour	Labour	Labour	Labour	Labour	Labour	Labour
Southport		Conservative	Conservative	Conservative	Conservative	Conservative	Conservative	Conservative
Stretford		Conservative	Conservative	Conservative	Conservative	Conservative	Labour	Conservative
Warrington		Labour	Labour	Labour	Labour	Labour Co-op	Labour Co-op	Labour Co-op
Westhoughton		Labour	Labour	Labour	Labour	Labour	Labour	Labour
Widnes		Labour	Labour	Labour	Labour	Labour	Labour	Labour
Wigan		Labour	Labour	Labour	Labour	Labour	Labour	Labour

=== Cheshire (15 then 16) ===
Constituency	1950	1951	1955	1959	1964	1966	1970
Altrincham and Sale	Conservative	Conservative	Conservative	Conservative	Conservative	Conservative	Conservative
Bebington	Conservative	Conservative	Conservative	Conservative	Conservative	Labour	Conservative
Birkenhead	Labour	Labour	Labour	Labour	Labour	Labour	Labour
Cheadle	Conservative	Conservative	Conservative	Conservative	Conservative	Liberal	Conservative
Chester	Conservative	Conservative	Conservative	Conservative	Conservative	Conservative	Conservative
Crewe	Labour	Labour	Labour	Labour	Labour	Labour	Labour
Knutsford	Conservative	Conservative	Conservative	Conservative	Conservative	Conservative	Conservative
Macclesfield	Conservative	Conservative	Conservative	Conservative	Conservative	Conservative	Conservative
Nantwich	N/A		Conservative	Conservative	Conservative	Conservative	Conservative
Northwich	Conservative	Conservative	Conservative	Conservative	Conservative	Conservative	Conservative
Runcorn	Conservative	Conservative	Conservative	Conservative	Conservative	Conservative	Conservative
Stalybridge and Hyde	Labour	Labour	Labour	Labour	Labour	Labour	Labour
Stockport North	Conservative	Conservative	Conservative	Conservative	Labour	Labour	Conservative
Stockport South	Conservative	Conservative	Conservative	Conservative	Labour	Labour	Labour
Wallasey	Conservative	Conservative	Conservative	Conservative	Conservative	Conservative	Conservative
Wirral	Conservative	Conservative	Conservative	Conservative	Conservative	Conservative	Conservative

== North East (28) ==
=== County Durham (18) ===
Constituency	1950	1951	1955	1959	1964	1966	1970
Bishop Auckland	Labour	Labour	Labour	Labour	Labour	Labour	Labour
Blaydon	Labour	Labour	Labour	Labour	Labour	Labour	Labour
Chester-le-Street	Labour	Labour	Labour	Labour	Labour	Labour	Labour
Consett	Labour	Labour	Labour	Labour	Labour	Labour	Labour
Darlington	Labour	Conservative	Conservative	Conservative	Labour	Labour	Labour
Durham	Labour	Labour	Labour	Labour	Labour	Labour	Labour
Durham North West	Labour	Labour	Labour	Labour	Labour	Labour	Labour
Easington	Labour	Labour	Labour	Labour	Labour	Labour	Labour
Gateshead East	Labour	Labour	Labour	Labour	Labour	Labour	Labour
Gateshead West	Labour	Labour	Labour	Labour	Labour	Labour	Labour
The Hartlepools	Labour	Labour	Labour	Conservative	Labour	Labour	Labour
Houghton-le-Spring	Labour	Labour	Labour	Labour	Labour	Labour	Labour
Jarrow	Labour	Labour	Labour	Labour	Labour	Labour	Labour
Sedgefield	Labour	Labour	Labour	Labour	Labour	Labour	Labour
South Shields	Labour	Labour	Labour	Labour	Labour	Labour	Labour
Stockton-on-Tees	Labour	Labour	Labour	Labour	Labour	Labour	Labour
Sunderland North	Labour	Labour	Labour	Labour	Labour	Labour	Labour
Sunderland South	Labour	Labour	Conservative	Conservative	Labour	Labour	Labour

=== Northumberland (10) ===
Constituency	1950	1951	1955	1959	1964	1966	1970
Berwick-upon-Tweed	Conservative	Conservative	Conservative	Conservative	Conservative	Conservative	Conservative
Blyth	Labour	Labour	Labour	Labour	Labour	Labour	Labour
Hexham	Speaker (Con)	Conservative	Conservative	Conservative	Conservative	Conservative	Conservative
Morpeth	Labour	Labour	Labour Co-op	Labour Co-op	Labour Co-op	Labour Co-op	Labour
Newcastle upon Tyne Central	Labour	Labour	Labour	Labour	Labour	Labour	Labour
Newcastle upon Tyne East	Labour	Labour	Labour	Conservative	Labour Co-op	Labour Co-op	Labour Co-op
Newcastle upon Tyne North	Conservative	National Liberal	National Liberal	Conservative	Conservative	Conservative	Conservative
Newcastle upon Tyne West	Labour	Labour	Labour	Labour	Labour	Labour	Labour
Tynemouth	Conservative	Conservative	Conservative	Conservative	Conservative	Conservative	Conservative
Wallsend	Labour	Labour	Labour	Labour	Labour	Labour	Labour

== Yorkshire (58 to 1955; 56 from 1955) ==
=== York (1) ===
Constituency	1950	1951	1955	1959	1964	1966	1970
York	Conservative	Conservative	Conservative	Conservative	Conservative	Labour	Labour

=== East Riding (7) ===
Constituency	1950	1951	1955	1959	1964	1966	1970
Beverley / Howden (from 1955)	Conservative	Conservative	Conservative	Conservative	Conservative	Conservative	Conservative
Bridlington	Conservative	Conservative	Conservative	Conservative	Conservative	Conservative	Conservative
Goole	Labour	Labour	Labour	Labour	Labour	Labour	Labour
Kingston upon Hull, Haltemprice / Haltemprice (from 1955)	Conservative	Conservative	Conservative	Conservative	Conservative	Conservative	Conservative
Kingston upon Hull Central / Kingston upon Hull West (from 1955)	Labour	Labour	Labour	Labour	Labour	Labour	Labour
Kingston upon Hull East	Labour	Labour	Labour	Labour	Labour	Labour	Labour
Kingston upon Hull North	Conservative	Conservative	Conservative	Conservative	Labour	Labour	Labour

=== North Riding (7) ===
Constituency	1950	1951	1955	1959	1964	1966	1970
Cleveland	Labour	Labour	Labour Co-op	Conservative	Labour	Labour	Labour
Harrogate	Conservative	Conservative	Conservative	Conservative	Conservative	Conservative	Conservative
Middlesbrough East	Labour	Labour	Labour	Labour	Labour	Labour	Labour
Middlesbrough West	Labour	Conservative	Conservative	Conservative	Labour	Labour	Conservative
Richmond (Yorks)	Conservative	Conservative	Conservative	Conservative	Conservative	Conservative	Conservative
Scarborough and Whitby	Conservative	Conservative	Conservative	Conservative	Conservative	Conservative	Conservative
Thirsk and Malton	Conservative	Conservative	Conservative	Conservative	Conservative	Conservative	Conservative

=== West Riding (43 then 41) ===
Constituency	1950	1951	1955	1959	1964	1966	1970
Barkston Ash	Conservative	Conservative	Conservative	Conservative	Conservative	Conservative	Conservative
Barnsley	Labour	Labour	Labour	Labour	Labour	Labour	Labour
Batley and Morley	Labour	Labour	Labour	Labour	Labour	Labour	Labour
Bradford Central	Labour	Labour	N/A				
Bradford East	Labour	Labour	Labour	Labour	Labour	Labour	Labour
Bradford North	Conservative	Conservative	Conservative	National Liberal	Labour	Labour	Labour
Bradford South	Labour	Labour	Labour	Labour	Labour	Labour	Labour
Bradford West	N/A		Conservative	National Liberal	National Liberal	Labour Co-op	Conservative
Brighouse and Spenborough	Labour	Labour	Labour	Labour	Labour	Labour	Conservative
Colne Valley	Labour	Labour	Labour	Labour	Labour	Liberal	Labour
Dearne Valley	Labour	Labour	Labour	Labour	Labour	Labour	Labour
Dewsbury	Labour	Labour	Labour	Labour	Labour	Labour	Labour
Don Valley	Labour	Labour	Labour	Labour	Labour	Labour	Labour
Doncaster	Labour	Conservative	Conservative	Conservative	Labour	Labour	Labour
Halifax	Labour	Labour	Conservative	Conservative	Labour	Labour	Labour
Hemsworth	Labour	Labour	Labour	Labour	Labour	Labour	Labour
Huddersfield East	Labour	Labour	Labour	Labour	Labour	Labour	Labour
Huddersfield West	Liberal	Liberal	Liberal	Liberal	Labour	Labour	Labour
Keighley	Labour	Labour	Labour	Conservative	Labour	Labour	Conservative
Leeds Central / Leeds South East (from 1955)	Labour	Labour	Labour	Labour	Labour	Labour	Labour
Leeds North / Leeds North East (from 1955)	Conservative	Conservative	Conservative	Conservative	Conservative	Conservative	Conservative
Leeds North East	Labour	Labour	N/A				
Leeds North West	Conservative	Conservative	Conservative	Conservative	Conservative	Conservative	Conservative
Leeds South	Labour	Labour	Labour	Labour	Labour	Labour	Labour
Leeds South East / Leeds East (from 1955)	Labour	Labour	Labour	Labour	Labour	Labour	Labour
Leeds West	Labour	Labour	Labour	Labour	Labour	Labour	Labour
Normanton	Labour	Labour	Labour	Labour	Labour	Labour	Labour
Penistone	Labour	Labour	Labour	Labour	Labour	Labour	Labour
Pontefract	Labour	Labour	Labour	Labour	Labour	Labour	Labour
Pudsey	Conservative	Conservative	Conservative	Conservative	Conservative	Conservative	Conservative
Ripon	Conservative	Conservative	Conservative	Conservative	Conservative	Conservative	Conservative
Rother Valley	Labour	Labour	Labour	Labour	Labour	Labour	Labour
Rotherham	Labour	Labour	Labour	Labour	Labour	Labour	Labour
Sheffield Attercliffe	Labour	Labour	Labour	Labour	Labour	Labour	Labour
Sheffield Brightside	Labour	Labour	Labour	Labour	Labour	Labour	Labour
Sheffield Hallam	Conservative	Conservative	Conservative	Conservative	Conservative	Conservative	Conservative
Sheffield Heeley	Conservative	Conservative	Conservative	Conservative	Conservative	Labour	Conservative
Sheffield Hillsborough	Labour Co-op	Labour Co-op	Labour Co-op	Labour Co-op	Labour Co-op	Labour Co-op	Labour Co-op
Sheffield Neepsend	Labour	Labour	N/A				
Sheffield Park	Labour	Labour	Labour	Labour	Labour	Labour	Labour
Shipley	Conservative	Conservative	Conservative	Conservative	Conservative	Conservative	Conservative
Skipton	Conservative	Conservative	Conservative	Conservative	Conservative	Conservative	Conservative
Sowerby	Labour	Labour	Labour	Labour	Labour	Labour	Labour
Wakefield	Labour	Labour	Labour	Labour	Labour	Labour	Labour

== Wales (36) ==
=== Anglesey (1) ===
Constituency	1950	1951	1955	1959	1964	1966	1970
Anglesey	Liberal	Labour	Labour	Labour	Labour	Labour	Labour

=== Caernarfonshire (2) ===
Constituency	1950	1951	1955	1959	1964	1966	1970
Caernarfon	Labour	Labour	Labour	Labour	Labour	Labour	Labour
Conway	Labour	Conservative	Conservative	Conservative	Conservative	Labour	Conservative

=== Denbighshire (2) ===
Constituency	1950	1951	1955	1959	1964	1966	1970
Denbigh	National Liberal	National Liberal	National Liberal	Conservative	Conservative	Conservative	Conservative
Wrexham	Labour	Labour	Labour	Labour	Labour	Labour	Labour

=== Flintshire (2) ===
Constituency	1950	1951	1955	1959	1964	1966	1970
Flintshire East	Labour	Labour	Labour	Labour	Labour	Labour	Labour
Flintshire West	Conservative	Conservative	Conservative	Conservative	Conservative	Conservative	Conservative

=== Merionethshire (1) ===
Constituency	1950	1951	1955	1959	1964	1966	1970
Merionethshire	Liberal	Labour	Labour	Labour	Labour	Labour	Labour

=== Montgomeryshire (1) ===
Constituency	1950	1951	1955	1959	1964	1966	1970
Montgomeryshire	Liberal	Liberal	Liberal	Liberal	Liberal	Liberal	Liberal

=== Breconshire and Radnorshire (1) ===
Constituency	1950	1951	1955	1959	1964	1966	1970
Brecon and Radnorshire	Labour	Labour	Labour	Labour	Labour	Labour	Labour

=== Cardiganshire (1) ===
Constituency	1950	1951	1955	1959	1964	1966	1970
Cardiganshire	Liberal	Liberal	Liberal	Liberal	Liberal	Labour	Labour

=== Carmarthenshire (2) ===
Constituency	1950	1951	1955	1959	1964	1966	1970
Carmarthen	Liberal	Liberal	Liberal	Labour	Labour	Labour	Labour
Llanelli	Labour	Labour	Labour	Labour	Labour	Labour	Labour

=== Pembrokeshire (1) ===
Constituency	1950	1951	1955	1959	1964	1966	1970
Pembrokeshire	Labour	Labour	Labour	Labour	Labour	Labour	Conservative

=== Glamorgan (16) ===
Constituency	1950	1951	1955	1959	1964	1966	1970
Aberavon	Labour	Labour	Labour	Labour	Labour	Labour	Labour
Aberdare	Labour	Labour	Labour	Labour	Labour	Labour	Labour
Barry	Labour	Conservative	Conservative	Conservative	Conservative	Conservative	Conservative
Caerphilly	Labour	Labour	Labour	Labour	Labour	Labour	Labour
Cardiff North	Conservative	Conservative	Conservative	Conservative	Conservative	Labour	Conservative
Cardiff South East	Labour	Labour	Labour	Labour	Labour	Labour	Labour
Cardiff West	Labour	Labour	Labour	Labour	Labour	Labour	Labour
Gower	Labour	Labour	Labour	Labour	Labour	Labour	Labour
Merthyr Tydfil	Labour	Labour	Labour	Labour	Labour	Labour	Independent Labour
Neath	Labour	Labour	Labour	Labour	Labour	Labour	Labour
Ogmore	Labour	Labour	Labour	Labour	Labour	Labour	Labour
Pontypridd	Labour	Labour	Labour	Labour	Labour	Labour	Labour
Rhondda East	Labour	Labour	Labour	Labour	Labour	Labour	Labour
Rhondda West	Labour	Labour	Labour	Labour	Labour	Labour	Labour
Swansea East	Labour	Labour	Labour	Labour	Labour	Labour	Labour
Swansea West	Labour	Labour	Labour	Conservative	Labour	Labour	Labour

=== Monmouthshire (6) ===
Constituency	1950	1951	1955	1959	1964	1966	1970
Abertillery	Labour	Labour	Labour	Labour	Labour	Labour	Labour
Bedwellty	Labour	Labour	Labour	Labour	Labour	Labour	Labour
Ebbw Vale	Labour	Labour	Labour	Labour	Labour	Labour	Labour
Monmouth	Conservative	Conservative	Conservative	Conservative	Conservative	Labour	Conservative
Newport (Monmouthshire)	Labour	Labour	Labour	Labour	Labour	Labour	Labour
Pontypool	Labour	Labour	Labour	Labour	Labour	Labour	Labour

== Scotland (71) ==
=== Orkney and Shetland (1) ===
Constituency	1950	1951	1955	1959	1964	1966	1970
Orkney and Shetland	Liberal	Liberal	Liberal	Liberal	Liberal	Liberal	Liberal

=== Caithness and Sutherland (1) ===
Constituency	1950	1951	1955	1959	1964	1966	1970
Caithness and Sutherland	Conservative	Conservative	Conservative	Ind. Conservative	Liberal	Labour	Labour

=== Inverness-shire and Ross and Cromarty (3) ===
Constituency	1950	1951	1955	1959	1964	1966	1970
Inverness	Conservative	Conservative	Conservative	Conservative	Liberal	Liberal	Liberal
Ross and Cromarty	National Liberal	National Liberal	National Liberal	National Liberal	Liberal	Liberal	Conservative
Western Isles	Labour	Labour	Labour	Labour	Labour	Labour	SNP

=== Banffshire (1) ===
Constituency	1950	1951	1955	1959	1964	1966	1970
Banff	Conservative	Conservative	Conservative	Conservative	Conservative	Conservative	Conservative

=== Moray and Nairnshire (1) ===
Constituency	1950	1951	1955	1959	1964	1966	1970
Moray and Nairn	Conservative	Conservative	Conservative	Conservative	Conservative	Conservative	Conservative

=== Aberdeenshire (4) ===
Constituency	1950	1951	1955	1959	1964	1966	1970
Aberdeen North	Labour	Labour	Labour	Labour	Labour	Labour	Labour
Aberdeen South	Conservative	Conservative	Conservative	Conservative	Conservative	Labour	Conservative
Aberdeenshire East	Conservative	Conservative	Conservative	Conservative	Conservative	Conservative	Conservative
Aberdeenshire West	Conservative	Conservative	Conservative	Conservative	Conservative	Liberal	Conservative

=== Angus and Kincardineshire (4) ===
Constituency	1950	1951	1955	1959	1964	1966	1970
Angus North and Mearns	National Liberal	National Liberal	National Liberal	National Liberal	Conservative	Conservative	Conservative
Angus South	National Liberal	National Liberal	National Liberal	National Liberal	Conservative	Conservative	Conservative
Dundee East	Labour	Labour	Labour	Labour	Labour	Labour	Labour
Dundee West	Labour	Labour	Labour	Labour	Labour	Labour	Labour

=== Argyll (1) ===
Constituency	1950	1951	1955	1959	1964	1966	1970
Argyll	Conservative	Conservative	Conservative	Conservative	Conservative	Conservative	Conservative

=== Perthshire and Kinross-shire (2) ===
Constituency	1950	1951	1955	1959	1964	1966	1970
Kinross and West Perthshire	Conservative	Conservative	Conservative	Conservative	Conservative	Conservative	Conservative
Perth and East Perthshire	Conservative	Conservative	Conservative	Conservative	Conservative	Conservative	Conservative

=== Stirlingshire and Clackmannanshire (3) ===
Constituency	1950	1951	1955	1959	1964	1966	1970
Stirling and Falkirk	Labour	Labour	Labour	Labour	Labour	Labour	Labour
Stirlingshire West	Labour	Labour	Labour	Labour	Labour	Labour	Labour
Stirlingshire East and Clackmannan	Labour	Labour	Labour	Labour	Labour	Labour	Labour Co-op

=== Fife (4) ===
Constituency	1950	1951	1955	1959	1964	1966	1970
Dunfermline Burghs	Labour	Labour	Labour	Labour	Labour	Labour	Labour
Fife East	National Liberal	National Liberal	National Liberal	National Liberal	Conservative	Conservative	Conservative
Fife West	Labour	Labour	Labour	Labour	Labour	Labour	Labour
Kirkcaldy Burghs	Labour	Labour	Labour	Labour	Labour	Labour	Labour

=== Dunbartonshire (2) ===
Constituency	1950	1951	1955	1959	1964	1966	1970
Dunbartonshire East	Labour	Labour	Labour	Labour	Labour	Labour	Labour
Dunbartonshire West	Labour	Labour	Labour	Labour	Labour	Labour	Labour

=== Renfrewshire (4) ===
Constituency	1950	1951	1955	1959	1964	1966	1970
Greenock	Labour	Labour	Labour Co-op	Labour Co-op	Labour Co-op	Labour Co-op	Labour Co-op
Paisley	Labour	Labour	Labour	Labour	Labour	Labour	Labour
Renfrewshire East	Conservative	Conservative	Conservative	Conservative	Conservative	Conservative	Conservative
Renfrewshire West	National Liberal	National Liberal	National Liberal	National Liberal	Labour	Labour	Labour

=== Ayrshire and Bute (5) ===
Constituency	1950	1951	1955	1959	1964	1966	1970
Ayr	Conservative	Conservative	Conservative	Conservative	Conservative	Conservative	Conservative
Ayrshire Central	Labour	Labour	Conservative	Labour	Labour	Labour	Labour
Ayrshire North and Bute	Conservative	Conservative	Conservative	Conservative	Conservative	Conservative	Conservative
Ayrshire South	Labour	Labour	Labour	Labour	Labour	Labour	Labour
Kilmarnock	Labour	Labour	Labour	Labour	Labour	Labour	Labour

=== Lanarkshire (22) ===
Constituency	1950	1951	1955	1959	1964	1966	1970
Bothwell	Labour	Labour	Labour	Labour	Labour	Labour	Labour
Coatbridge and Airdrie	Labour	Labour	Labour	Labour	Labour	Labour	Labour
Glasgow Bridgeton	Labour	Labour	Labour	Labour	Labour	Labour	Labour
Glasgow Camlachie / Glasgow Provan (from 1955)	Labour	Labour	Labour	Labour	Labour	Labour	Labour
Glasgow Cathcart	Conservative	Conservative	Conservative	Conservative	Conservative	Conservative	Conservative
Glasgow Central	Labour	Labour	Labour	Labour	Labour	Labour	Labour
Glasgow Craigton	N/A		Conservative	Labour	Labour	Labour	Labour
Glasgow Gorbals	Labour	Labour	Labour	Labour	Labour	Labour	Labour
Glasgow Govan	Conservative	Conservative	Labour Co-op	Labour Co-op	Labour Co-op	Labour Co-op	Labour Co-op
Glasgow Hillhead	Conservative	Conservative	Conservative	Conservative	Conservative	Conservative	Conservative
Glasgow Kelvingrove	Conservative	Conservative	Conservative	Conservative	Labour	Labour	Labour
Glasgow Maryhill	Labour	Labour	Labour	Labour	Labour	Labour	Labour
Glasgow Pollok	Conservative	Conservative	Conservative	Conservative	Labour	Labour	Labour
Glasgow Scotstoun	Conservative	Conservative	Conservative	Labour	Labour	Labour	Labour
Glasgow Shettleston	Labour	Labour	Labour	Labour	Labour	Labour	Labour
Glasgow Springburn	Labour Co-op	Labour Co-op	Labour Co-op	Labour Co-op	Labour	Labour	Labour
Glasgow Tradeston	Labour Co-op	Labour Co-op	N/A				
Glasgow Woodside	Conservative	Conservative	Conservative	Conservative	Labour	Labour	Labour
Hamilton	Labour	Labour	Labour	Labour	Labour	Labour	Labour
Lanark	Conservative	Conservative	Conservative	Labour	Labour	Labour	Labour
Lanarkshire North	Labour	Labour	Labour	Labour	Labour	Labour	Labour
Motherwell	Labour	Labour	Labour	Labour	Labour	Labour	Labour
Rutherglen	Labour	Conservative	Conservative	Conservative	Labour	Labour	Labour

=== West Lothian (1) ===
Constituency	1950	1951	1955	1959	1964	1966	1970
West Lothian	Labour	Labour	Labour	Labour	Labour	Labour	Labour

=== Midlothian and Peeblesshire / Midlothian (from 1955) (8) ===
Constituency	1950	1951	1955	1959	1964	1966	1970
Edinburgh Central	Labour	Labour	Labour	Labour	Labour	Labour	Labour
Edinburgh East	Labour	Labour	Labour	Labour	Labour	Labour	Labour
Edinburgh Leith	Labour	Labour	Labour	Labour	Labour	Labour	Labour
Edinburgh North	Conservative	Conservative	Conservative	Conservative	Conservative	Conservative	Conservative
Edinburgh Pentlands	Conservative	Conservative	Conservative	Conservative	Conservative	Conservative	Conservative
Edinburgh South	Conservative	Conservative	Conservative	Conservative	Conservative	Conservative	Conservative
Edinburgh West	Conservative	Conservative	Conservative	Conservative	Conservative	Conservative	Conservative
Midlothian and Peebles / Midlothian (from 1955)	Labour	Labour	Labour	Labour	Labour	Labour	Labour

=== Dumfriesshire (1) ===
Constituency	1950	1951	1955	1959	1964	1966	1970
Dumfries	National Liberal	National Liberal	National Liberal	National Liberal	Conservative	Conservative	Conservative

=== Kirkcudbrightshire and Wigtownshire (1) ===
Constituency	1950	1951	1955	1959	1964	1966	1970
Galloway	Conservative	Conservative	Conservative	Conservative	Conservative	Conservative	Conservative

=== Roxburghshire and Selkirkshire / Roxburghshire, Selkirkshire and Peeblesshire (from 1955) (1) ===
Constituency	1950	1951	1955	1959	1964	1966	1970
Roxburgh & Selkirk / Roxburgh, Selkirk & Peebles (1955)	Liberal	Conservative	Conservative	Conservative	Conservative	Liberal	Liberal

=== Berwickshire and East Lothian (1) ===
Constituency	1950	1951	1955	1959	1964	1966	1970
Berwick and East Lothian	Labour	Conservative	Conservative	Conservative	Conservative	Labour	Labour

== Northern Ireland (12) ==
=== Antrim (6) ===
Constituency	1950	1951	1955	1959	1964	1966	1970
Antrim North	Ulster Unionist	Ulster Unionist	Ulster Unionist	Ulster Unionist	Ulster Unionist	Ulster Unionist	Protestant Unionist
Antrim South	Ulster Unionist	Ulster Unionist	Ulster Unionist	Ulster Unionist	Ulster Unionist	Ulster Unionist	Ulster Unionist
Belfast East	Ulster Unionist	Ulster Unionist	Ulster Unionist	Ulster Unionist	Ulster Unionist	Ulster Unionist	Ulster Unionist
Belfast North	Ulster Unionist	Ulster Unionist	Ulster Unionist	Ulster Unionist	Ulster Unionist	Ulster Unionist	Ulster Unionist
Belfast South	Ulster Unionist	Ulster Unionist	Ulster Unionist	Ulster Unionist	Ulster Unionist	Ulster Unionist	Ulster Unionist
Belfast West	Ulster Unionist	Irish Labour	Ulster Unionist	Ulster Unionist	Ulster Unionist	Republican Labour	Republican Labour

=== Down (2) ===
Constituency	1950	1951	1955	1959	1964	1966	1970
Down North	Ulster Unionist	Ulster Unionist	Ulster Unionist	Ulster Unionist	Ulster Unionist	Ulster Unionist	Ulster Unionist
Down South	Ulster Unionist	Ulster Unionist	Ulster Unionist	Ulster Unionist	Ulster Unionist	Ulster Unionist	Ulster Unionist

=== Armagh (1) ===
Constituency	1950	1951	1955	1959	1964	1966	1970
Armagh	Ulster Unionist	Ulster Unionist	Ulster Unionist	Ulster Unionist	Ulster Unionist	Ulster Unionist	Ulster Unionist

=== Fermanagh and Tyrone (2) ===
Constituency	1950	1951	1955	1959	1964	1966	1970
Fermanagh and South Tyrone	Nationalist	Nationalist	Ulster Unionist^{1}	Ulster Unionist	Ulster Unionist	Ulster Unionist	Unity
Mid Ulster	Independent Republican	Independent Republican	Independent Unionist^{2}	Ulster Unionist	Ulster Unionist	Ulster Unionist	Unity

^{1}The constituency was won by Philip Clarke of Sinn Féin, but he was unseated on petition on the basis that his criminal conviction (for Irish Republican Army activity) made him ineligible. Instead, the seat was awarded to the Ulster Unionist Party (UUP) candidate.

^{2}The seat was originally won by Tom Mitchell of Sinn Féin, but Mitchell was subsequently unseated upon petition, on the grounds that his terrorist convictions made him ineligible to sit in Parliament. The seat was awarded to Charles Beattie of the UUP. However, Beattie in turn was also found ineligible to sit due to holding an office of profit under the crown, triggering a further by-election.

=== Londonderry (1) ===
Constituency	1950	1951	1955	1959	1964	1966	1970
Londonderry	Ulster Unionist	Ulster Unionist	Ulster Unionist	Ulster Unionist	Ulster Unionist	Ulster Unionist	Ulster Unionist
