= Thomas Duffield (MP for Abingdon) =

Thomas Duffield (October 1782 – 15 March 1854) was a Tory politician who sat in the House of Commons from 1832 to 1844.

Duffield was born at Ancaster in Lincolnshire, the youngest son of Michael Duffield and his wife, Alice Duffield, younger daughter of Jeremiah Crutchley Senior of Southwark in Surrey (now Greater London) and sister of Jeremiah Crutchley Junior of Sunninghill Park in Berkshire. (Duffield's older brother George inherited Sunninghill Park on the death of Jeremiah Crutchley Junior in December 1805, and changed his name to Crutchley.)

Thomas Duffield was elected Member of Parliament for Abingdon under the reformed parliament at the 1832 general election. He held the seat until 1844.

Duffield eloped with Amelia ('Emily') Maria Frances Elwes, daughter and sole heiress of George Elwes Esq of Marcham Park at Marcham in Berkshire (now Oxfordshire) and granddaughter of the notoriously miserly John Elwes, MP for Berkshire. They had three sons and five daughters together. They inherited Marcham and extended the estate by the purchase of Upwood. Emily died in 1835 and Duffield married a second time to Augusta Elizabeth, 2nd daughter of Lieut-Col Robert Rushbrooke of Rushbrooke Park in Suffolk. They had two sons and three daughters.

Duffield died in Wallingford in Berkshire (now Oxfordshire), at the age of 61, on 15 March 1854.

Parliament of the United Kingdom
Preceded by John Maberly	Member of Parliament for Abingdon; 1832 – 1844	Succeeded by Sir Frederic Thesiger
