= George Knapp (MP) =

Politician, died 1809

- Born: 29 January 1754; Abingdon
- Died: 12 November 1809 (aged 55); Abingdon

George Knapp (1754 – 1809) was a British Member of Parliament.

== Early life and education ==
George Knapp was born during 1754 in Abingdon, the son of a prominent grocer George Knapp Sr. He was educated at John Roysse's Free School in Abingdon, (now Abingdon School) along with his brother Henry. One of his school friends was William Bagshaw Stevens who became headmaster of Repton School.

== Career ==
George and his younger brother Henry became grocers, running a shop in West St Helen Street before George became a banker. George started a career in politics and by 1780 was a freeman. He later became a secondary burgess (1780), bailiff, chamberlain (1790) and principal burgess (1791). He became Mayor of Abingdon-on-Thames in 1792 and subsequently held office in 1797, 1799 and 1807. Both he and his brother Henry were to become Mayors, following in the footsteps of their father George Knapp Sr. and they both ran the family banking business from the Old Banking House in Ock Street.

On 20 July 1798, the Borough records show that Knapp headed a committee to confer with John Lemprière regarding the Ordinances of Abingdon School. Lemprière has been the subject of complaints stating he had been negligent in his duties at the School and at St Nicolas' Church.

After an unsuccessful parliamentary election in November 1806 he was defeated by Sir Thomas Metcalfe, 1st Baronet for the Abingdon seat but the following year in the May 1807 election he gained the seat from Metcalfe, winning by a margin of seven. Also during the year of 1807 he was a Steward of the Old Abingdonian Club.

== Death ==
He died in mysterious circumstances in 1809. There were reports that he was thrown from a gig on his head and died from an affection of the brain and fatal fever but there are suspicions that it may have been as a result of a duel.

== Personal life ==
George was a gambler (in 1807 he declined to pay for the Members' Purse at the Abingdon Races). He never married but is believed to have had two illegitimate daughters, based on the evidence within his will.

== See also ==
- List of Old Abingdonians

Parliament of the United Kingdom
Preceded by Sir Thomas Metcalfe, 1st Baronet	Member of Parliament for Abingdon; 1807–1809	Succeeded by Henry Bowyer
