= 1916 Abingdon by-election =

Abingdon house of Commons parliamentary by-election was held in 1916

The 1916 Abingdon by-election, was a parliamentary by-election held for the UK House of Commons constituency of Abingdon on 29 August 1916.

== Vacancy ==
The by-election was caused by the resignation of the Conservative MP Harold Henderson who had held the seat since winning it in the January 1910 general election. Henderson had resigned on his appointment as military secretary to the Duke of Devonshire who was to become Governor General of Canada in November 1916.

== Candidates ==
The former Member of Parliament, Archie Loyd, who had represented Abingdon from 1895 to 1906, stood unopposed as the Conservative candidate.

== The result ==
Loyd was returned unopposed.

Abingdon by-election, 1916:
Party	Candidate	Votes	%	±%
Conservative	Archie Loyd	Unopposed	N/A	N/A
Conservative hold				

== See also ==
- List of United Kingdom by-elections
- United Kingdom by-election records
