= Archie Loyd =

British politician

Archie Kirkman Loyd KC

Member of Parliament for Abingdon (UK Parliament constituency)
- In office 19 July 1895 – 17 Jan 1906
- Preceded by: Philip Wroughton
- Succeeded by: Edward Anthony Strauss
- In office 29 Aug 1916 – 14 December 1918
- Preceded by: Harold Greenwood Henderson
- Succeeded by: John Tyson Wigan

Personal details
- Born: 22 January 1847 Agra, North-Western Provinces, India
- Died: 1 December 1922 (aged 75) Chelsea, London, England
- Party: Conservative
- Spouse: Henrietta Louisa Clutterbuck
- Children: 4 sons
- Education: Brighton College
- Profession: Barrister

Archie Kirkman Loyd, KC (22 January 1847 – 1 December 1922) was a British civil servant, barrister and twice Member of Parliament for Abingdon.

== Early life ==
Loyd was born on 22 January 1847 in Agra in the North-Western Provinces of India, the third son of Thomas Kirkman Loyd and Annie Hirst Loyd (née Haig). He was educated at Brighton College then as a pupil of Walter Wren, he took the open competition for the Indian Civil Service and later won prizes for English Law and Hindi. He resigned for the Indian Civil Service in 1868 when he was called to the bar by the Middle Temple and in 1892 he was appointed a Queen's Counsel.

== Politics ==
In the 1895 General Election he was elected as a Member of Parliament for Abingdon as a member of the Conservative Party. He retired in 1905 but was returned again as a member in a by-election which he held until November 1918. He was appointed a deputy lieutenant of Berkshire in 1900.

== Red Cross and other work ==
Loyd worked with his second cousin's husband, Lord Wantage, who had formed the National Aid Society in 1870, the society helped the sick and wounded from war and Loyd worked abroad for the Society particularly during the Franco-German war and in Turkey and Serbia. Loyd was one of only two survivors of the original society when in 1905 it changed name as the British Red Cross Society and he became vice-chairman of the society's council. He was on the governing body of Abingdon School from 1901 to 1922.

== Family life ==
Loyd had married Henrietta Louisa Clutterbuck in 1885 and they had four sons. They lived at Downs House in Wantage in Berkshire (now Oxfordshire). He had a serious operation in November 1918 which restricted his activities and he died on 1 December 1922 at his home 21 Cadogan Square, Chelsea, London.

Parliament of the United Kingdom
Preceded by Philip Wroughton	Member of Parliament for Abingdon; 1895 – 1906	Succeeded by Edward Anthony Strauss
Preceded by Harold Greenwood Henderson	Member of Parliament for Abingdon; 1916 – 1918	Succeeded by John Tyson Wigan
