= Robert Byng (16th-century MP) =

Member of the Parliament of England

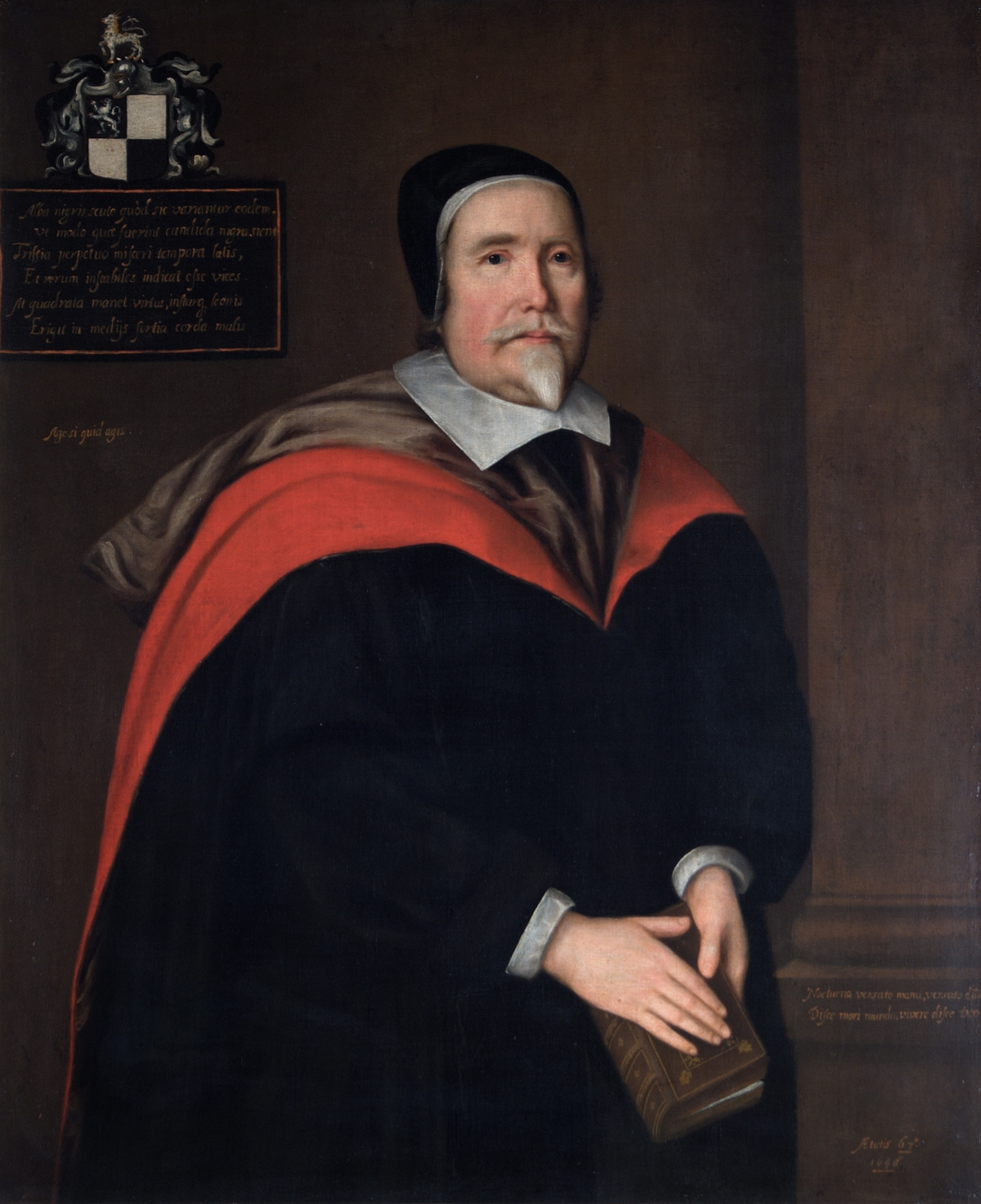
- Portrait of Robert Byng attributed to Cornelis Janssens van Ceulen
- Died: 2 September 1595
- Occupation: Member of Parliament

Robert Byng (by 1530–1595) was the eldest son of John Byng of Wrotham and Agnes Spencer. He was twice elected to Parliament, representing Steyning in 1555 and Abingdon in 1559. The latter seat was probably gained through the influence of his first wife's stepfather Sir John Mason.

He married twice. His first wife, Frances Hill, was the daughter of Richared Hill of Hartley Wintney with whom he had three sons, including his heir George Byng. His second wife was Mary Maynard, with whom he had three sons and a daughter. One of them was the son William Byng (1586–1669), Captain of Deal Castle 1611–1642. Robert Byng died on 2 September 1595.

Parliament of England
Preceded by John Roberts; William Pellatt	Member of Parliament for Steyning; 1555	Succeeded by Richard Onslow; Robert Colshill
Preceded by Oliver Hyde	Member of Parliament for Abingdon; 1559	Succeeded by Oliver Hyde
