= John Creemer Clarke =

British politician

- Born: c.1821
- Died: 11 February 1895

John Creemer Clarke (30 May 1821 – 11 February 1895) was an English merchant and cloth manufacturer and a Liberal politician who sat in the House of Commons from 1874 to 1885.

== Early life ==
Clarke was the son of Robert Clarke of St Giles in the Wood, Devon and his wife Graciana Creemer, daughter of John Creemer of Exbourne Devon.

== Career ==
He started work in a drapery business in Bideford before moving to Abingdon from Devon in 1840. He joined the firm of Hyde and Son, clothing manufacturers before it became Hyde, Son and Clarke, and finally Clarke, Sons and Co. The factory in West St Helen Street employed 2,000 people at one stage making it one of the largest clothing manufacturers in the country.

He was a Justice of the Peace for Abingdon-on-Thames and Mayor of Abingdon-on-Thames in 1869. He was also Chairman of Abingdon Railway Company from 1873. He was one of the initial directors of the Blackpool Railway Company, incorporated on 7 August 1884. In 1887, he was a member of the small syndicate assembled by Robert William Perks to inject £300,000 of additional share capital into the Barry Railway Company. This proved to be a high-return investment for the syndicate members.

At the 1874 general election, Clarke was elected as the Member of Parliament (MP) for Abingdon. He was re-elected in 1880 and he held the seat until he retired from Parliament at the 1885 general election.

In 1878 he was one of the four men elected to represent the Oxford District at that year's Wesleyan Methodist Conference, the first to admit lay representatives.

== Other work ==
Clarke was a philanthropist who gave land and helped fund the building of Trinity Wesleyan Methodist Church often referred to as 'Clarke's Chapel'. He also funded the building of the Cottage Hospital in Abingdon in 1886.

He was on the governing body of Abingdon School from c.1890 until 1895 and was a Master of Christ's Hospital of Abingdon.

== Personal life ==
Clarke married firstly in 1845 Anna Maria Avis, daughter of John Avis of Minehead Somerset. She died in 1848 and in 1849 he married secondly Elizabeth Joyce, daughter of John Joyce of Timberscombe Somerset. He and his first wife had one child, John Heber Clarke (1846–1898). He and his second wife had three sons and six daughters. His second son predeceased him. The 1861 census shows that he resided at Waste Court, a property that was handed down to his third son Harry Thomas Clarke (a borough magistrate) on his death in 1895. Waste Court is now part of Abingdon School and was renamed Austin House in 2015. Both his eldest son John Heber Clarke and Harry Thomas Clarke were Mayors of Abingdon. His third daughter, Florence Creemer Clarke, married William Alexander McArthur (1857–1923) in 1890.

Parliament of the United Kingdom
| Preceded by Charles Hugh Lindsay | Member of Parliament for Abingdon; 1874 – 1885 | Succeeded by Philip Wroughton |
