= Abingdon (constituency) =

Parliamentary constituency in the United Kingdom 1801–1983

- Former county constituency for the House of Commons
- Boundary of Abingdon in Berkshire, boundaries 1974–1983
- County: Berkshire

1885–1983
- Seats: One
- Created from: Berkshire and Abingdon
- Replaced by: Wantage and Oxford West & Abingdon

1558–1885
- Seats: One
- Type of constituency: Borough constituency

Abingdon was a parliamentary constituency in England, represented in the House of Commons of the Parliament of England until 1707, then of the Parliament of Great Britain from 1707 to 1800 and of the Parliament of the United Kingdom from 1801 to 1885. It elected one Member of Parliament (MP) from 1558 until 1983, making it one of the few English constituencies in the unreformed House of Commons to elect only one Member of Parliament (MP) by the first past the post system of election.

== History ==
Abingdon was one of three English parliamentary boroughs enfranchised by Queen Mary I as anomalous single-member constituencies, and held its first Parliamentary election in 1558. The borough consisted of part of two parishes in the market town of Abingdon, then the county town of Berkshire. The right to vote was exercised by all inhabitant householders paying scot and lot and not receiving alms; the highest recorded number of votes to be cast before 1832 was 253, at the general election of 1806.

Abingdon's voters seem always to have maintained their independence, and the constituency never came under the influence of a "patron" who assumed the right to choose the MP. Nevertheless, this did not always guarantee a pure election, and Porritt records that Abingdon offers the earliest case he was able to trace of a candidate trying to bribe voters with the promise of official office, later one of the most widespread abuses in English elections. In 1698, the defeated candidate, William Hucks, petitioned against the election of Sir Simon Harcourt, but during the hearing of the case it emerged that Hucks had promised that should he be elected an MP he would be made a Commissioner of the Excise, in which case he would use that power to appoint several of the voters to well-paid excise posts. The petition was dismissed and Hucks was committed to the custody of the sergeant-at-arms. (But ten years later, defeated again by Harcourt at the election of 1708, Hucks petitioned once more, on grounds of intimidation and other illegal practices, and this time Harcourt was ejected from his seat and Hucks declared to have been duly elected. Harcourt complained that the decision was a partisan one – which would have been by no means unusual at the period – "insisting to the last that he was the legal member, by a clear majority, by the most fair estimation".)

In 1831, the population of the borough was approximately 5,300, and contained 1,192 houses. This was sufficient for Abingdon to retain its MP under the Great Reform Act. (Indeed, it would have been big enough to retain two MPs had it had them, but there was no question of its representation being increased.) Its boundaries were unaltered, and under the reformed franchise 300 of the residents were qualified to vote.

In 1885 the borough constituency was abolished and the town was moved into a new county, The Northern or Abingdon Division of Berkshire. This constituency consisted of the northern part of the historic county, and as well as Abingdon included the towns of Wantage and Wallingford; it was predominantly agricultural at first, although its character changed during the 20th century with the growth of light industry round Abingdon, and it was generally a safe Conservative seat. This constituency survived essentially intact, with only minor boundary changes, until the 1983 general election, by which time it was simply called Abingdon County Constituency.

Abingdon was abolished in 1983 after changes in administrative boundaries resulting from the Local Government Act 1972 moved most of the northern part of the historic county of Berkshire, including Abingdon, into the county of Oxfordshire.

== Boundaries and boundary changes ==
=== 1885–1918 ===
- The petty sessional divisions of Abingdon, Faringdon, Wallingford, and Wantage;
- The municipal borough of Wallingford; and
- The parts of the municipal boroughs of Abingdon and Oxford in Berkshire.

=== 1918–1950 ===
- The rural district of Abingdon (the civil parishes of Abingdon St Helen Without, Appleford, Appleton-with-Eaton, Besselsleigh, Cumnor, Draycot Moor, Drayton, Frilford, Fyfield, Garford, Kingston Bagpuize, Lyford, Marcham, Milton, North Hinksey, Radley, South Hinksey, Steventon, Sunningwell, Sutton Courtenay, Sutton Wick, Tubney, Wootton, and Wytham);
- The rural district of Wallingford (the civil parishes of Aston Tirrold, Aston Upthorpe, Brightwell-cum-Sotwell, Cholsey, Didcot, East Hagbourne, Little Wittenham, Long Wittenham, Moulsford, North Moreton, South Moreton, and West Hagbourne);
- The rural district of Wantage (the civil parishes of Aldworth, Ardington, Beedon, Blewbury, Brightwalton, Catmore, Chaddleworth, Childrey, Chilton, Compton, Denchworth, East Challow, East Hanney, East Hendred, East Ilsley, Farnborough, Fawley, Goosey, Grove, Hampstead Norris, Harwell, Hermitage, Letcombe Bassett, Letcombe Regis, Lockinge, Peasemore, Sparshlt, Upton, West Challow, West Hanney and West Hendred, and West Ilsley);
- The part of the rural district of Bradfield which consisted of the civil parishes of Ashampstead, Basildon, Frilsham, Streatley, and Yattendon;
- The part of the rural district of Faringdon which was within the administrative county of Berkshire (the civil parishes of Ashbury, Baulking, Bourton, Buckland, Buscot, Charney Bassett, Coleshill, Compton Beauchamp, Eaton Hastings, Fernham, Great Coxwell, Great Faringdon, Hatford, Hinton Waldrist, Kingston Lisle, Little Coxwell, Littleworth, Longcot, Longworth, Pusey, Shellingford, Stanford in the Vale, Uffington, Watchfield, and Woolstone);
- The municipal boroughs of Abingdon and Wallingford; and
- The urban district of Wantage.

The constituency's boundaries were adjusted slightly by the Representation of the People Act 1918, gaining a small part of the Newbury Division. It was redefined in terms of the administrative county of Berkshire and the county districts created by the Local Government Acts of 1888 and 1894.

=== 1950–1974 ===
- The boroughs of Abingdon and Wallingford;
- The urban district of Wantage; and
- The rural districts of Abingdon, Faringdon, Wallingford and Wantage.

Under the Representation of the People Act 1948, Abingdon was altered marginally, with the part of the rural district of Bradfield being transferred to Newbury.

=== 1974–1983 ===
As above. The constituency was not altered by the Parliamentary Constituencies (England) Order of 1970, but was slightly amended prior to the February 1974 general election to take account of changes to local government boundaries.

As a result of the constituency boundary changes introduced at the 1983 general election, the Abingdon constituency was divided; most of its electors were placed in the new Wantage constituency and a significant minority including electors in the town of Abingdon were placed in the Oxford West and Abingdon constituency. A small part to the south of the constituency had been retained within Berkshire and this area was transferred to Newbury.

== Members of Parliament ==
=== 1558–1640 ===
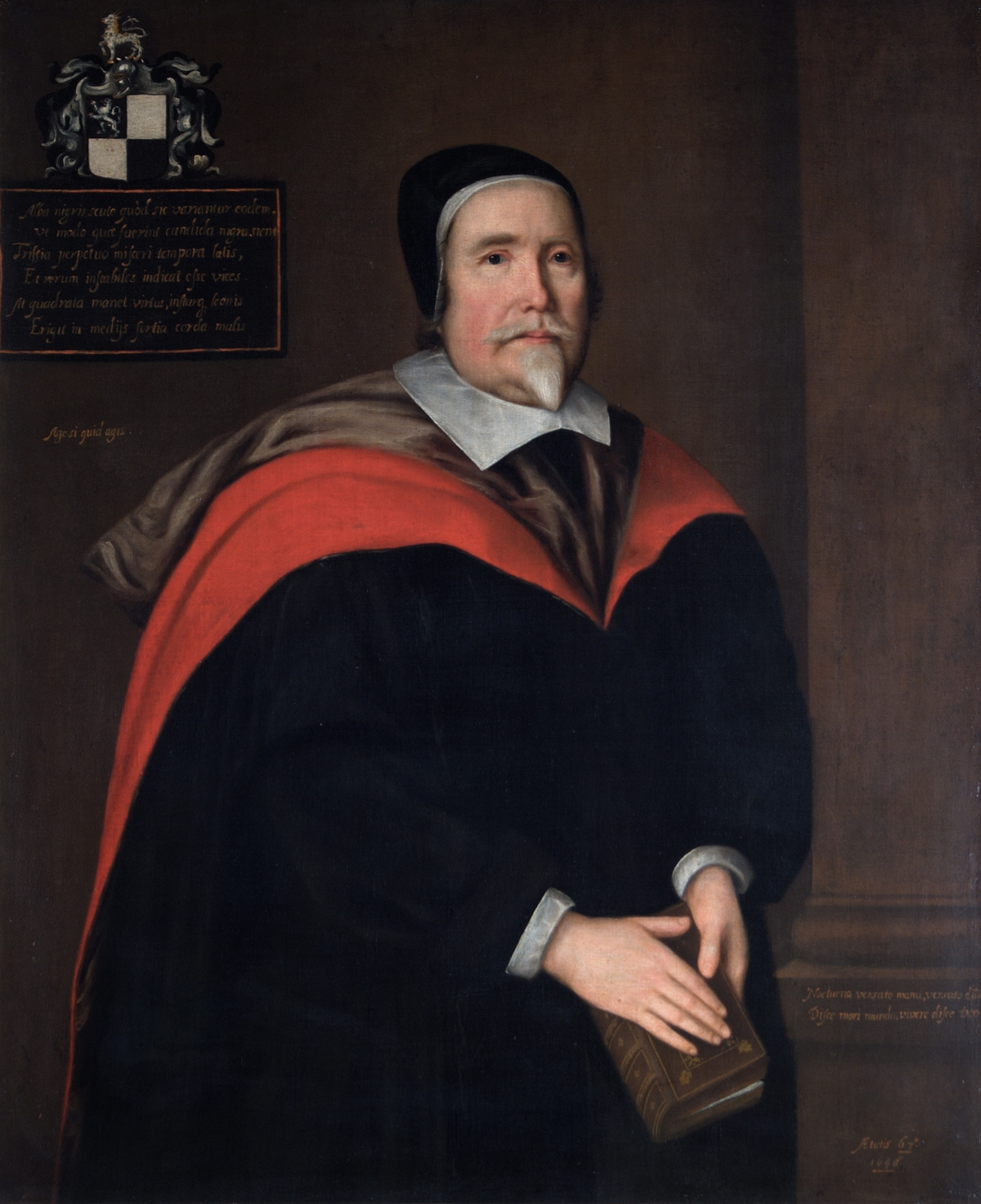
Robert Byng served as the Member of Parliament for Abingdon in the Parliament of 1559.

Parliament	Member
Parliament of 1558	Oliver Hyde
Parliament of 1559	Robert Byng
Parliament of 1563–1567	Oliver Hyde (Died during the Parliament); Anthony Forster (Elected 1566)
Parliament of 1571	Anthony Forster
Parliament of 1572–1583	Anthony Forster (Died during the Parliament); Richard Beake (Elected 1572)
Parliament of 1584–1585	Hon. Edward Norreys
Parliament of 1586–1587	Griffith Lloyd, chose to sit for Cardiganshire, replaced by Miles Sandys
Parliament of 1588–1589	Hon. Sir Edward Norreys
Parliament of 1593	William Braunche
Parliament of 1597–1598	Francis Little
Parliament of 1601	Robert Ryche
Parliament of 1604–1611	Sir Richard Lovelace
Addled Parliament (1614)	Sir Robert Knollys
Parliament of 1621–1622	Robert Hyde
Happy Parliament (1624–1625)	Sir Robert Knollys
Useless Parliament (1625)	Sir Robert Knollys
Parliament of 1625–1626	Sir Robert Knollys
Parliament of 1628–1629	Sir John Stonhouse, 2nd Bt.
No Parliament summoned 1629–1640

=== 1640–1885 ===
Election	Member	Party
April 1640	Sir George Stonhouse, 3rd Baronet	Royalist
January 1644	Stonhouse disabled to sit – seat vacant	
1645	John Ball (Died 1648)	
1649	Henry Neville	
1653	Abingdon was unrepresented in the Barebones Parliament	
1654	Thomas Holt	
1656	Thomas Holt	
January 1659	Sir John Lenthall	
May 1659	Henry Neville	
April 1660	Sir George Stonhouse, 3rd Baronet	
1675	Sir John Stonhouse, 2nd Bt	
January 1689	Thomas Medlycott (Note: Medlycott's election was declared void on petition, and a new election was held)	
May 1689	John Southby (Note: Southby was returned as elected by the Mayor, but on petition the Commons decided that Stonhouse and not Southby had received the most votes, and eventually declared Stonhouse duly elected)	
January 1690	Sir John Stonhouse, 2nd Bt	
February 1690	Sir Simon Harcourt	Tory
1705	Grey Neville	Whig
1708	Sir Simon Harcourt (Note: Harcourt was initially declared elected, but on petition alleging "that Sir Simon, by menaces and by other illegal practices of himself and his agents, procured several votes for him, and several were admitted to vote for him who had no right", the result was overturned and Hucks declared to have been duly elected)	Tory
1709	William Hucks	Whig
October 1710	Sir Simon Harcourt	Tory
December 1710	James Jennings	Tory
1713	Hon. Simon Harcourt	
1715	James Jennings	Tory
1722	Robert Hucks	Whig
1741	John Wright	
1747	John Morton (Note: At the election of 1768, Morton was declared re-elected, but on petition the result was overturned and his opponent Bayly declared elected instead)	Tory
1770	Nathaniel Bayly	Whig
1774	John Mayor (Note: On petition, Mayor's election was declared void, since as High Sheriff of Berkshire he was not eligible to be elected MP for a borough within the county. A new election was ordered, by which time Mayor had completed his term as sheriff and was re-elected.)	Tory
1782	Henry Howorth	
1783	Edward Loveden Loveden	Whig
1796	Thomas Metcalfe	Tory
1807	George Knapp	Whig
1809	Henry Bowyer	
1811	Sir George Bowyer, 6th Bt	Whig
1818	John Maberly	Whig
1832	Thomas Duffield	Tory
1834	Thomas Duffield	Conservative
1844 by-election	Sir Frederick Thesiger	Conservative
July 1852 by-election	James Caulfeild	Whig
December 1852	Montagu Bertie	Whig
1854 by-election	Joseph Haythorne Reed	Whig
1857	John Thomas Norris	Radical
1859	John Thomas Norris	Liberal
1865	Hon. Charles Lindsay	Conservative
1874	John Creemer Clarke	Liberal
1885	Parliamentary borough abolished	

=== MPs 1885–1983 ===
After the abolition of the parliamentary borough of Abingdon, a new county division of Berkshire was created.

Election	Member	Party
1885	Philip Wroughton	Conservative
1895	Archie Loyd	Conservative
1906	Edward Strauss	Liberal
1910 (Jan)	Harold Henderson	Conservative
1916 by-election	Archie Loyd	Conservative
1918	John Tyson Wigan	Coalition Conservative
1921 by-election	Arthur Loyd	Coalition Conservative
1922	Arthur Loyd	Conservative
1923	Edward Lessing	Liberal
1924	Sir Ralph Glyn, 1st Bt.	Conservative
1953 by-election	Airey Neave	Conservative
1979	Thomas Benyon	Conservative
1983	Constituency abolished	

== Elections ==
Sources 1754–1784: Namier and Brooke; (parties) Stooks Smith. Positive swing is from Whig to Tory. Sources 1885–1900: House of Commons 1901.

1754 general election: Abingdon
Party	Candidate	Votes	%
Tory	John Morton	133	57.08
Non Partisan	Henry Thrale	100	42.92
Majority		33	14.16
Turnout		233	N/A
Tory win (new seat)			

1761 general election: Abingdon
Party	Candidate	Votes	%	±%
Tory	John Morton	Unopposed		
Tory hold		Swing	N/A	

- Seat vacated on appointment of Morton as Chief Justice of Chester

By-Election 1762: Abingdon
Party	Candidate	Votes	%	±%
Tory	John Morton	Unopposed		
Tory hold		Swing	N/A	

1768 general election: Abingdon
Party	Candidate	Votes	%	±%
Tory	John Morton	126	50.40	N/A
Whig	Nathaniel Bayly	124	49.60	New
Majority		2	0.80	N/A
Turnout		250	N/A	N/A
Tory hold		Swing	N/A	

- On petition Nathaniel Bayly seated in place of John Morton, 8 February 1770

1774 general election: Abingdon
Party	Candidate	Votes	%	±%
Tory	John Mayor	146	55.73	+5.33
Whig	Thomas Wooldridge	116	44.27	−5.33
Majority		30	11.46	+10.66
Turnout		262	N/A	N/A
Tory hold		Swing	+5.33	

- Tory hold from previous general election; Tory gain from Whig, from change on petition.
- Election declared void, 6 March 1775

By-Election 1775: Abingdon
Party	Candidate	Votes	%	±%
Tory	John Mayor	Unopposed		
Tory hold		Swing	N/A	

1780 general election: Abingdon
Party	Candidate	Votes	%	±%
Tory	John Mayor	137	71.35	+15.62
Whig	Thomas Wooldridge	55	28.65	−15.62
Majority		82	42.70	+31.24
Turnout		192	N/A	N/A
Tory hold		Swing	+15.62	

- Change is calculated from the previous general election.
- Resignation of Mayor.

By-Election 1782: Abingdon
Party	Candidate	Votes	%	±%
Non Partisan	Henry Howorth	Unopposed		
Nonpartisan gain from Tory		Swing	N/A	

- Death of Howorth

By-Election 1783: Abingdon
Party	Candidate	Votes	%	±%
Whig	Edward Loveden	Unopposed		
Whig gain from Nonpartisan		Swing	N/A	

1784 general election: Abingdon
Party	Candidate	Votes	%	±%
Whig	Edward Loveden	Unopposed		
Whig hold		Swing	N/A	

=== Elections in the 1830s ===
1830 general election: Abingdon
Party	Candidate	Votes	%	±%
Whig	John Maberly	159	62.8	N/A
Tory	Ebenezer Maitland	94	37.2	N/A
Majority		65	25.6	N/A
Turnout		253		N/A
Whig hold		Swing	N/A	

1831 general election: Abingdon
Party	Candidate	Votes	%	±%
Whig	John Maberly	Unopposed		
Whig hold				

1832 general election: Abingdon
Party	Candidate	Votes	%	±%
Tory	Thomas Duffield	157	78.1	New
Whig	William Leader Maberly	43	21.4	N/A
Whig	Thomas Bowles	1	0.5	N/A
Majority		114	56.7	N/A
Turnout		201	67.0	N/A
Registered electors		300		
Tory gain from Whig				

1835 general election: Abingdon
Party	Candidate	Votes	%	±%
Conservative	Thomas Duffield	Unopposed		
Registered electors		292		
Conservative hold				

1837 general election: Abingdon
Party	Candidate	Votes	%	±%
Conservative	Thomas Duffield	Unopposed		
Registered electors		306		
Conservative hold				

=== Elections in the 1840s ===
1841 general election: Abingdon
Party	Candidate	Votes	%	±%
Conservative	Thomas Duffield	Unopposed		
Registered electors		321		
Conservative hold				

Duffield resigned by accepting the office of Steward of the Chiltern Hundreds, causing a by-election.

By-election 1844: Abingdon
Party	Candidate	Votes	%	±%
Conservative	Frederic Thesiger	Unopposed		
Conservative hold				

Thesiger was appointed Attorney General for England and Wales, requiring a by-election.

By-election 1845: Abingdon
Party	Candidate	Votes	%	±%
Conservative	Frederic Thesiger	156	55.3	N/A
Whig	James Caulfeild	126	44.7	New
Majority		30	10.6	N/A
Turnout		282	89.5	N/A
Registered electors		315		
Conservative hold		Swing	N/A	

1847 general election: Abingdon
Party	Candidate	Votes	%	±%
Conservative	Frederic Thesiger	153	50.3	N/A
Whig	James Caulfeild	151	49.7	N/A
Majority		2	0.6	N/A
Turnout		304	89.7	N/A
Registered electors		339		
Conservative hold		Swing	N/A	

=== Elections in the 1850s ===
Thesiger was appointed Attorney General for England and Wales, requiring a by-election.

By-election 1852: Abingdon
Party	Candidate	Votes	%	±%
Conservative	Frederic Thesiger	Unopposed		
Conservative hold				

1852 general election: Abingdon
Party	Candidate	Votes	%	±%
Whig	James Caulfeild	Unopposed		
Registered electors		312		
Whig gain from Conservative				

Caulfeild's death caused a by-election.

By-election 1852: Abingdon
Party	Candidate	Votes	%	±%
Whig	Montague Bertie	153	54.3	N/A
Conservative	Daniel Higford Davall Burr	129	45.7	New
Majority		24	8.6	N/A
Turnout		282	90.4	N/A
Registered electors		312		
Whig hold		Swing	N/A	

Bertie succeeded to the peerage, becoming 6th Earl of Abingdon and causing a by-election.

By-election 1854: Abingdon
Party	Candidate	Votes	%	±%
Whig	Joseph Haythorne Reed	125	51.7	−2.6
Radical	John Thomas Norris	117	48.3	N/A
Majority		8	3.4	−5.2
Turnout		242	62.2	−28.2
Registered electors		389		
Whig hold		Swing	N/A	

1857 general election: Abingdon
Party	Candidate	Votes	%	±%
Radical	John Thomas Norris	Unopposed		
Registered electors		323		
Radical gain from Whig				

1859 general election: Abingdon
Party	Candidate	Votes	%	±%
Liberal	John Thomas Norris	144	54.8	N/A
Conservative	John Godfrey Bellingham Hudson	119	45.2	New
Majority		25	9.6	N/A
Turnout		263	82.2	N/A
Registered electors		320		
Liberal hold		Swing	N/A	

=== Elections in the 1860s ===
1865 general election: Abingdon
Party	Candidate	Votes	%	±%
Conservative	Charles Lindsay	137	54.2	+9.0
Liberal	John Thomas Norris	116	45.8	−9.0
Majority		21	8.4	N/A
Turnout		253	83.2	+1.0
Registered electors		304		
Conservative gain from Liberal		Swing		

Lindsay was appointed a Groom in Waiting to Queen Victoria, requiring a by-election.

By-election 1866: Abingdon
Party	Candidate	Votes	%	±%
Conservative	Charles Lindsay	Unopposed		
Conservative hold				

1868 general election: Abingdon
Party	Candidate	Votes	%	±%
Conservative	Charles Lindsay	397	55.1	+0.9
Liberal	Godfrey Lushington	324	44.9	−0.9
Majority		73	10.2	+1.8
Turnout		721	90.0	+6.8
Registered electors		801		
Conservative hold		Swing	+0.9	

=== Elections in the 1870s ===
1874 general election: Abingdon
Party	Candidate	Votes	%	±%
Liberal	John Creemer Clarke	439	56.9	+12.0
Conservative	Charles Lindsay	333	43.1	−12.0
Majority		106	13.8	N/A
Turnout		772	89.8	−0.2
Registered electors		860		
Liberal gain from Conservative		Swing	+12.0	

=== Elections in the 1880s ===
1880 general election: Abingdon
Party	Candidate	Votes	%	±%
Liberal	John Creemer Clarke	428	52.6	−4.3
Conservative	Alban Gibbs	386	47.4	+4.3
Majority		42	5.2	−8.6
Turnout		814	91.5	+1.7
Registered electors		890		
Liberal hold		Swing	−4.3	

Purvis

1885 general election: Abingdon
Party	Candidate	Votes	%	±%
Conservative	Philip Wroughton	4,245	58.7	+11.3
Liberal	Robert Purvis	2,986	41.3	−11.3
Majority		1,259	17.4	N/A
Turnout		7,231	82.3	−9.2
Registered electors		8,791		
Conservative gain from Liberal		Swing	+11.3	

1886 general election: Abingdon
Party	Candidate	Votes	%	±%
Conservative	Philip Wroughton	3,899	67.1	+8.4
Liberal	Edward Colston Keevil	1,910	32.9	−8.4
Majority		1,989	34.2	+16.8
Turnout		5,809	66.1	−16.2
Registered electors		8,791		
Conservative hold		Swing	+8.4	

=== Elections in the 1890s ===
1892 general election: Abingdon
Party	Candidate	Votes	%	±%
Conservative	Philip Wroughton	3,565	52.4	−14.7
Liberal	Charles Alfred Pryce	3,239	47.6	+14.7
Majority		326	4.8	−29.4
Turnout		6,804	79.3	+13.2
Registered electors		8,585		
Conservative hold		Swing	−14.7	

1895 general election: Abingdon
Party	Candidate	Votes	%	±%
Conservative	Archie Loyd	4,064	57.4	+5.0
Liberal	Charles Alfred Pryce	3,019	42.6	−5.0
Majority		1,045	14.8	+10.0
Turnout		7,083	82.2	+2.9
Registered electors		8,615		
Conservative hold		Swing	+5.0	

=== Elections in the 1900s ===
1900 general election: Abingdon
Party	Candidate	Votes	%	±%
Conservative	Archie Loyd	Unopposed		
Registered electors		8,698		
Conservative hold				

Edward Strauss

1906 general election: Abingdon
Party	Candidate	Votes	%	±%
Liberal	Edward Strauss	3,943	51.1	New
Conservative	Harold Henderson	3,767	48.9	N/A
Majority		176	2.2	N/A
Turnout		7,710	86.9	N/A
Registered electors		8,875		
Liberal gain from Conservative		Swing	N/A	

=== Elections in the 1910s ===
January 1910 general election: Abingdon
Party	Candidate	Votes	%	±%
Conservative	Harold Henderson	4,829	56.1	+7.2
Liberal	Edward Strauss	3,776	43.9	−7.2
Majority		1,053	12.2	N/A
Turnout		8,605	93.0	+6.1
Conservative gain from Liberal		Swing	+7.2	

December 1910 general election: Abingdon
Party	Candidate	Votes	%	±%
Conservative	Harold Henderson	4,677	58.4	+2.3
Liberal	Morton Harcourt Sands	3,328	41.6	−2.3
Majority		1,349	16.8	+4.6
Turnout		8,005		
Conservative hold		Swing	+2.3	

1918 general election: Abingdon
Party		Candidate	Votes	%	±%
C	Unionist	John Tyson Wigan	Unopposed		
	Unionist hold				
C indicates candidate endorsed by the coalition government.

=== Elections in the 1920s ===
1921 Abingdon by-election
Party		Candidate	Votes	%	±%
C	Unionist	Arthur Loyd	Unopposed		
	Unionist hold				
C indicates candidate endorsed by the coalition government.

1922 general election: Abingdon
Party	Candidate	Votes	%	±%
Unionist	Arthur Loyd	10,507	51.3	N/A
Liberal	Edward Lessing	9,967	48.7	New
Majority		540	2.6	N/A
Turnout		20,474	77.1	N/A
Unionist hold		Swing	N/A	

1923 general election: Abingdon
Party	Candidate	Votes	%	±%
Liberal	Edward Lessing	10,932	50.6	+1.9
Unionist	Ralph Glyn	10,678	49.4	−1.9
Majority		254	1.2	N/A
Turnout		21,610	79.5	+2.4
Liberal gain from Unionist		Swing	+1.9	

1924 general election: Abingdon
Party	Candidate	Votes	%	±%
Unionist	Ralph Glyn	13,117	56.4	+7.0
Liberal	Edward Lessing	8,805	37.8	−12.8
Labour	D F Brundril	1,355	5.8	New
Majority		4,312	18.6	N/A
Turnout		23,277	82.9	+3.4
Unionist gain from Liberal		Swing		

1929 general election: Abingdon
Party	Candidate	Votes	%	±%
Unionist	Ralph Glyn	14,094	47.4	−9.0
Liberal	Edward Lessing	11,896	40.1	+2.3
Labour	Arthur Reade	3,712	12.5	+6.7
Majority		2,198	7.3	−11.3
Turnout		25,990	80.8	−2.1
Unionist hold		Swing	−5.7	

=== Elections in the 1930s ===
1931 general election: Abingdon
Party	Candidate	Votes	%	±%
Conservative	Ralph Glyn	Unopposed		
Conservative hold				

1935 general election: Abingdon
Party	Candidate	Votes	%	±%
Conservative	Ralph Glyn	Unopposed		
Conservative hold				

=== Elections in the 1940s ===
A General election was due to take place before the end of 1940, but was postponed due to the Second World War. By 1939, the following candidates had been selected to contest this constituency;

- Conservative: Ralph Glyn
- Liberal: A D Macdonald MC
- Labour: Frank W Bourne

1945 general election: Abingdon
Party	Candidate	Votes	%	±%
Conservative	Ralph Glyn	16,968	44.6	N/A
Labour	Dale Hope Parkinson	11,980	31.5	New
Liberal	John Henry Charles Miller	7,031	18.5	New
Communist	John Clement Dix Dunman	1,668	4.4	New
Independent	Sir Charles Arland Maitland Freake, 4th Baronet	419	1.1	New
Majority		4,988	13.1	N/A
Turnout		38,066	64.1	N/A
Conservative hold		Swing		

=== Elections in the 1950s ===
1950 general election: Abingdon
Party	Candidate	Votes	%	±%
Conservative	Ralph Glyn	20,595	46.45	
Labour	Robert Jarrett McCullagh	16,733	37.74	
Liberal	Eric Digby Tempest Vane	6,612	14.91	
Communist	John Clement Dix Dunman	396	0.89	
Majority		3,862	8.71	
Turnout		44,336	82.10	
Conservative hold		Swing		

1951 general election: Abingdon
Party	Candidate	Votes	%	±%
Conservative	Ralph Glyn	24,774	55.47	
Labour	John EG Curthoys	19,891	44.53	
Majority		4,883	10.94	
Turnout		44,665	79.96	
Conservative hold		Swing		

1953 Abingdon by-election
Party	Candidate	Votes	%	±%
Conservative	Airey Neave	22,986	53.24	−2.23
Labour	Ted Castle	17,126	39.67	−4.86
Liberal	George Allen	3,060	7.09	New
Majority		5,860	13.57	+2.64
Turnout		43,172	75.9	−4.06
Conservative hold		Swing	+1.3	

1955 general election: Abingdon
Party	Candidate	Votes	%	±%
Conservative	Airey Neave	25,613	50.00	
Labour	Margaret Reid	16,979	33.15	
Liberal	George Allen	8,634	16.85	N/A
Majority		8,634	16.85	
Turnout		51,226	87.59	
Conservative hold		Swing		

1959 general election: Abingdon
Party	Candidate	Votes	%	±%
Conservative	Airey Neave	27,943	54.19	
Labour	Philip Picard	16,971	32.91	
Liberal	Verdun Isabel Perl	6,651	12.90	
Majority		10,972	21.28	
Turnout		51,565	80.77	
Conservative hold		Swing		

=== Elections in the 1960s ===
1964 general election: Abingdon
Party	Candidate	Votes	%	±%
Conservative	Airey Neave	26,707	47.98	
Labour	Frederick J Riddell	20,334	36.53	
Liberal	Verdun Isabel Perl	8,627	15.50	
Majority		6,373	11.45	
Turnout		55,668	80.56	
Conservative hold		Swing		

1966 general election: Abingdon
Party	Candidate	Votes	%	±%
Conservative	Airey Neave	27,749	46.3	−1.7
Labour	Alan H.S. Matterson	24,447	40.8	+4.3
Liberal	Denis H.V. Case	7,703	12.9	−2.6
Majority		3,302	5.5	−5.9
Turnout		59,899	82.5	+1.9
Conservative hold		Swing	+3.0	

=== Elections in the 1970s ===
1970 general election: Abingdon
Party	Candidate	Votes	%	±%
Conservative	Airey Neave	36,209	54.4	+8.1
Labour	Norman H. Price	23,136	34.8	−6.0
Liberal	S.R. Caradoc Evans	7,198	10.8	−2.1
Majority		13,073	19.6	+14.1
Turnout		66,543	77.6	−4.9
Conservative hold		Swing		

February 1974 general election: Abingdon
Party	Candidate	Votes	%	±%
Conservative	Airey Neave	34,771	46.8	−7.6
Labour	D.E.H. Moriarty	21,028	28.3	−6.5
Liberal	Michael Patrick Fogarty	18,458	24.9	+14.1
Majority		13,743	18.5	−1.1
Turnout		74,257	83.0	+5.4
Conservative hold		Swing		

October 1974 general election: Abingdon
Party	Candidate	Votes	%	±%
Conservative	Airey Neave	31,956	46.6	−0.2
Labour	D.E.H. Moriarty	21,319	31.1	+2.8
Liberal	Michael Patrick Fogarty	15,239	22.2	−2.7
Majority		10,637	15.5	−3.0
Turnout		68,514	75.8	−7.2
Conservative hold		Swing		

1979 general election: Abingdon
Party	Candidate	Votes	%	±%
Conservative	Thomas Benyon	41,211	53.8	+7.2
Labour	Andrew Popper	18,920	24.7	−6.4
Liberal	Ian Blair	16,164	21.1	−1.1
Independent	R. Pinder	381	0.5	New
Majority		22,291	29.1	+13.6
Turnout		76,676	79.5	+3.7
Conservative hold		Swing		

== See also ==
- List of United Kingdom Parliament constituencies (1950–1974) by region

== Bibliography ==
- Boundaries of Parliamentary Constituencies 1885–1972, compiled and edited by F. W. S. Craig (Political Reference Publications 1972)
- British Parliamentary Election Results 1832–1885, compiled and edited by F.W.S. Craig (The Macmillan Press 1977)
- British Parliamentary Election Results 1885–1918, compiled and edited by F.W.S. Craig (The Macmillan Press 1974)
- British Parliamentary Election Results 1918–1949, compiled and edited by F.W.S. Craig (The Macmillan Press 1977)
- D. Brunton & D. H. Pennington, Members of the Long Parliament (London: George Allen & Unwin, 1954)
- Sir Lewis Namier and John Brooke, The House of Commons 1754–1790 (London: HMSO 1964)
- J. E. Neale, The Elizabethan House of Commons (London: Jonathan Cape, 1949)
- Robert H O'Byrne, The Representative History of Great Britain and Ireland, Part II – Berkshire (London: John Ollivier, 1848)
- T. H. B. Oldfield, The Representative History of Great Britain and Ireland (London: Baldwin, Cradock & Joy, 1816)
- Henry Pelling, Social Geography of British Elections 1885–1910 (London: Macmillan, 1967)
- J Holladay Philbin, Parliamentary Representation 1832 – England and Wales (New Haven: Yale University Press, 1965)
- Edward Porritt and Annie G Porritt, The Unreformed House of Commons (Cambridge University Press, 1903)
- Henry Stooks Smith, The Parliaments of England (1st edition published in three volumes 1844–50; 2nd edition edited in one volume by F.W.S. Craig, Political Reference Publications, 1973)
- Frederic A Youngs, jr, "Guide to the Local Administrative Units of England, Vol I" (London: Royal Historical Society, 1979)
- Leigh Rayment's Historical List of MPs – Constituencies beginning with "A" (part 1)
