= Arthur Edwin Preston =

English antiquarian and historian (1852–1942)

- Born: 1 October 1852; Abingdon-on-Thames
- Died: 21 May 1942 (aged 89); Abingdon-on-Thames

Arthur Edwin Preston (1852-1942) was the Mayor of Abingdon-on-Thames, Master of Christ's Hospital and an antiquarian and historian.

== Early years and education ==
Son of John (saddler, coach proprietor and tax collector) and Frances Preston (née Prince), he was born in Abingdon on 1 January 1852, at 13 High Street, next to the old Lion Hotel.

He was educated at John Roysse's Free School in Abingdon-on-Thames (now Abingdon School) from 1861-1867. He gained a Bachelor of Arts at London University and became a fellow in 1882.

== Career ==
Before he attended university he had started to train as an accountant and was employed as a clerk. After University he became a chartered accountant and later became Borough Accountant of Abingdon. In 1887 he was called to the Bar at Gray's Inn. In 1891, he lived at the home of his widowed mother at Piccadilly House in Ock Street before marrying Lydia Jacobs of Burford in October 1895. He was the master of Abbey Lodge in 1893.

The couple purchased Whitefield in 1896 (14 Albert Park) at the time. The property today is the used as a health and medical centre for Abingdon School. He continued his career as a Chartered Accountant and Barrister at Law and was a founder member of the Institute of Chartered Accountants. He was the Borough Council accountant for twenty-two years. He became a governor of Abingdon School from 1902-1942 and was Chairman of the Governors from 1937-1939 and a life Governor of Christ's Hospital in 1909.

== Public service ==
He retired in 1908 and devoted his later years to public service. He was elected to Berkshire County Council in 1895 and in 1909 served three years as Mayor of Abingdon. He was Chairman of the County Council Finance Committee and a county magistrate. He was an Alderman of both County and Borough councils and on the Thames Conservancy Board and was made an Honorary Freeman in 1932. In 1922, he financed a major archaeological project in regard to the demolished 1538 Abbey church and in 1928 helped securing Waste Court for Abingdon School, where he remained as a governor for the rest of his life and was chairman from 1937 to 1939. In 1935, he financed a major ceiling restoration in the St Helens' Lady Chapel.

== Historian and author ==
He dedicated much of his time into researching the history of Abingdon and built up a large collection of documents and employing staff to transcribe and translate documents. He wrote several historical books including the St Nicholas Abingdon and Other Papers published in 1929, which covers the history of St Nicholas' Church, Abingdon School, and Fitzharris Manor.

He continued to finance Abingdon projects including the refurbishment of the Guildhall and Roysse Room (the original schoolroom of Abingdon School). He also helped restore Albert Park and founded the Abingdon Bowling Club and was co-founder of the Frilford Heath Golf Club. He was also a president of the Old Abingdonian Club.

== Death ==
Preston died in 1942 while still residing at Whitefield, his wife Lydia died one year later.

Political offices
Preceded by Harry Septimus Challenor	Mayor of Abingdon; 1909-12	Succeeded by William Legge

== See also ==
- List of Old Abingdonians
