= Mayor of Abingdon-on-Thames =

UK Mayor

- Coat of arms of Abingdon-on-Thames
- Incumbent; Cllr Andy Foulsham since 2022
- Term length: One municipal year
- Formation: 1556
- Website: Official website

The Mayor of Abingdon-on-Thames is a ceremonial post held by a member of Abingdon-on-Thames Council, elected annually by the council.

In 1556, Mary I of England granted a charter establishing a mayor, two bailiffs, twelve chief burgesses and sixteen secondary burgesses, the mayor to be clerk of the market, coroner and a Justice of the Peace. The charter nominated Richard Mayotte as the first Mayor in 1556. Originally, the mayor would be elected on the Feast of St. Michael and Archangel on 29 September.

== Historical list of mayors ==
Year	Mayor	Notes
1556	Richard Mayotte	
1557	William Mathewe	
1558	Humfreye Bostocke	
1559	Thomas Tonks	
1560	James Fyssher	
1561	Oliver Hide	
1562	Thomas Orpwoode	
1563	William Braunche	
1564	Richard Smythe	
1565	William Blacknoll	
1566	James Fyssher	
1567	Thomas Smythe	
1568	Richard Mayotte	
1569	Thomas Orpwoode	
1570	Lionell Bostocke	
1571	William Braunche	
1572	William Blacknoll	
1573	Thomas Smythe	
1574	Richard Quelche	
1575	Thomas Orpwoode	
1576	John Chauntrell	
1577	Lionell Bostocke	
1578	Richard Mayotte	
1579	Humfreye Hide/James Fyssher	
1580	John Fyssher	
1581	William Kysbie	
1582	William Braunche	
1583	Thomas Smythe	
1584	Thomas Mayotte	
1585	Pawle Orpwoode	
1586	Lionell Bostocke	
1587	William Kysbie/Henry Ayres	
1588	Humfreye Hide/William Braunche	
1589	Thomas Mayotte	
1590	William Lee	
1591	William Harte	
1592	Francis Brooke alias Little	
1593	Paull Orpwoode	
1594	Lionell Bostocke	
1595	Humfrey Hide	
1596	Robert Payne	
1597	Anthony Tesdale	
1598	Francis Brooke alias Little	
1599	Christopher Tesdale	
1600	Humfrey Hide	
1601	William Lee	
1602	Robert Payne	
1603	John Blacknall	
1604	Thomas Orpwoode	
1605	Thomas Mayott Jr.	
1606	Francis Brooke alias Little	
1607	William Lee	
1608	Lawrence Stevenson	
1609	John Mayott	
1610	John Fraunces	
1611	Robert Payne	
1612	Richard Curtyn	
1613	Richard Chicken	
1614	Christopher Tesdale	
1615	Thomas Orpwood	
1616	Thomas Mayott	
1617	Francis Little	
1618	William Lee	
1619	Lawrence Stevenson	
1620	John Mayott	
1621	Robert Payne	
1622	Richard Curtyn	
1623	Richard Chicken	
1624	Christopher Tesdale	
1625	Thomas Clempson	
1626	Richard Curtyn	
1627	John Mayott	
1628	John Bradford	
1629	William Lee	
1630	John Payne	
1631	Richard Chicken	
1632	John Teasdale	
1633	John Hawe	
1634	Benjamin Tesdale	
1635	Richard Barton	
1636	Edmund Franklyn	
1637	Benjamin Tesdale	
1638	William Castell	
1639	John Mayott	
1640	Robert Mayott	
1641	Edmund Franklyn	
1642	Joshua Tesdale	
1643	Edmund Franklyn/John Mayott	
1644	Richard Barton	
1645	Henry Langlie/William Castell/Thomas Steede	
1646	James Curten	
1647	Richard Cheyney	
1648	John Tesdale	
1649	William Wicks	
1650	Francis Payne	
1651	John Mayott	
1652	John Boulter	
1653	Henry Langlie	
1654	John Hanson	
1655	John Hanson	
1656	John Bolter	
1657	James Curten	
1658	Francis Paine	
1659	John Mayott	
1660	Thomas Paine	
1661	Edmond Franklyn	
1662	Edward Bond	
1663	William Cheyney	
1664	Jonathan Hawe	
1665	James Curten	
1666	William Cheyney	
1667	John Wichlowe	
1668	Thomas Hulcotts	
1669	Simon Hawkins	
1670	William Cheyney	
1671	James Curten	
1672	John Claxon	
1673	Simon Hawkins	
1674	William Cheyney Jr.	
1675	John Payne	
1676	William Cheyney	
1677	Robert Sellwood	
1678	John Payne	
1679	Robert Blackaller	
1680	Robert Sellwood	
1681	George Winchurst	
1682	William Foster	
1683	William Hawkins	
1684	Thomas Hulcotts	
1685	William Foster	
1686	John Saunders	
1687	William Foster/James Corderoy	
1688	William Foster/William Hawkins	
1689	James Corderoy	
1690	Robert Sellwood	
1691	William Hawkins	
1692	Robert Blackaller	
1693	George Drew	
1694	James Curten	
1695	John Payne	
1696	Robert Blackaller	
1697	John Sellwood	
1698	James Curten	
1699	James Curten	
1700	John Sellwood	
1701	John Spinage	
1702	Robert Sellwood	
1703	John Sellwood	
1704	Joseph Spinage	
1705	Michael Rawlins	
1706	Richard Ely	
1707	John Sellwood	
1708	John Spinage	
1709	Thomas King	
1710	Michael Rawlins	
1711	John Spinage	
1712	Mark Hawkins	
1713	William Dunn	
1714	Clement Sexton	
1715	Thomas Simes	
1716	Matthew Hart	
1717	William Philipson	
1718	Thomas Prince	
1719	William Tudor	
1720	William Philipson	
1721	Clement Sexton	
1722	John Fludyer	
1723	William Philipson	
1724	Clement Sexton	
1725	James Saunders	
1726	William Wells	
1727	James Saunders/William Philipson/John Fludyer	
1728	Matthew Anderson	
1729	William Dunn	
1730	Edward Saxton	
1731	Thomas Read	
1732	Edward Spinage	
1733	Josepeh Stockwell	
1734	Thomas Cullerne	
1735	Matthew Anderson	
1736	John Spinage	
1737	William Yateman	
1738	Thomas Cullerne	
1739	James Saunders	
1740	Edward Spinage	
1741	John Spinage	
1742	Richard Rose	
1743	Charles Cox	
1744	John Eldridge	
1745	Richard Rose	
1746	Matthew Anderson	
1747	John Eldridge	
1748	John Crossley	
1749	Richard Rose	
1750	Bernard Bedwell	
1751	Richard Beasley	
1752	Richard Rose	
1753	Thomas Justice	
1754	Henry Harding	
1755	Richard Rose	
1756	John Eldridge	
1757	Thomas Cullerne	
1758	Henry Harding	
1759	George Knapp Sr.	
1760	Henry Harding	
1761	John Nash	
1762	Thomas Prince	
1763	William Hawkins	
1764	Richard Rose	
1765	Joseph Penn	
1766	William Hawkins	
1767	George Knapp Sr.	
1768	Richard Rose	
1769	Edward Bagger	
1770	Richard Beesley	
1771	Richard Saunders	
1772	Richard Rose	
1773	William Stevens	
1774	John Payne	
1775	Richard Rose	
1776	Richard Saunders	
1777	William Hawkins	
1778	William Eldridge	
1779	John Harding	
1780	James Powell	
1781	William Allder	
1782	James Penn	
1783	John Bedwell	
1784	James Penn	
1785	George Hawkins	
1786	William Bowles	
1787	Edward Yates	
1788	Bartholomew Bradfield	
1789	James Powell	
1790	John Bedwell	
1791	Edward Child	
1792	George Knapp Jr.	
1793	James Smallbone	
1794	Henry Knapp/William Allder	
1795	William Eldridge	
1796	Edward Child	
1797	George Knapp Jr.	
1798	William Allder	
1799	George Knapp Jr.	

Year	Mayor	Notes
1800	Thomas Knight	
1801	Edward Child	
1802	William Allder	
1803	Thomas Knight Jr.	
1804	Henry Harding	
1805	Henry Knapp	
1806	Thomas Knight	
1807	George Knapp Jr.	
1808	Thomas Knight	
1809	Thomas Goodall	
1810	Thomas Knight	
1811	John Francis Spenlove	
1812	Thomas Knight	
1813	Henry Knapp	
1814	Samuel Cripps	
1815	Thomas Knight	
1816	James Cole	
1817	Thomas West	
1818	James Cole	
1819	Thomas Knight	
1820	Thomas Baker	
1821	John Francis Spenlove	
1822	James Cole	
1823	Thomas Knight	
1824	William Bowles	
1825	James Cole	
1826	William Doe Belcher	
1827	Thomas Knight	
1828	Charles King	
1829	James Cole	
1830	John Vindin Collingwood	
1831	Thomas Knight	
1832	John Francis Spenlove	
1833	James Cole	
1834	Benjamin Collingwood	
1835	William Doe Belcher	
1836	Charles King	
1837	John Harris	
1838	William Graham	
1839	William Doe Belcher	
1840	John Tomkins	
1841	Richard Badcock	
1842	John Hyde Jr.	
1843	John Harris	
1844	William Doe Belcher	
1845	Edwin James Trendell	
1846	Benjamin Collingwood	
1847	Charles Payne	
1848	William Graham	
1849	John Tomkins	
1850	John Hyde Jr.	
1851	Edwin James Trendell	
1852	Edwin James Trendell	
1853	William Doe Belcher	
1854	John Tomkins	
1855	William Doe Belcher	
1856	William Pemberton/John Tomkins	
1857	William Ballard	
1858	Edwin James Trendell	
1859	Edwin James Trendell	
1860	Edwin Payne	
1861	John Hyde Jr.	
1862	Richard Badcock	
1863	Bromley Challenor	
1864	Charles Payne	
1865	John Hyde Jr.	
1866	William Ballard	
1867	Edwin Payne	
1868	Edwin Payne	
1869	John Creemer Clarke	
1870	William Ballard	
1871	John Tomkins	
1872	John Tomkins	
1873	John Kent	
1874	John Thornhill Morland	
1875	John Thornhill Morland	
1876	Edwin Payne	
1877	John Tomkins	
1878	William Ballard	
1879	William Ballard	
1880	John Townsend	
1881	Edward Leader Shepherd	
1882	Edwin Payne	
1883	William Ballard	
1884	John Heber Clarke	
1885	John Thornhill Morland	
1886	John Tomkins	
1887	Edward Leader Shepherd	
1888	Edward Leader Shepherd	
1889	Thomas Townsend	
1890	John Tomkins	
1891	John Heber Clarke	
1892	Edward Morland	
1893	Edward Morland	
1894	Edward John Harris/John Heber Clarke	
1895	Edward John Harris	
1896	Charles Alfred Pryce	
1897	Thomas Townsend	
1898	Alfred Henry Simpson	
1899	John Thornhill Morland	
1900	John Thornhill Morland	
1901	John Thornhill Morland	
1902	Edward John Harris	
1903	John George Timothy West	
1904	Edward Leader Shepherd	
1905	William Brewer	
1906	John Ernest Alfred Cottrell	
1907	Edward John Harris	
1908	Harry Septimus Challenor	
1909	Arthur Edwin Preston	
1910	Arthur Edwin Preston	
1911	Arthur Edwin Preston	
1912	William Legge	
1913	Alex Walter Morland	
1914	Alex Walter Morland	
1915	Harry Thomas Clarke	
1916	Harry Thomas Clarke	
1917	Harry Septimus Challenor	
1918	Harry Septimus Challenor	
1919	Robert West Langford	
1920	Robert West Langford	
1921	Claude Rippon	
1922	Claude Rippon	
1923	Claude Rippon	
1924	John Dennis Godfrey	
1925	John Dennis Godfrey	
1926	John Dennis Godfrey	
1927	Archibald Bradfield Woodley	
1928	Archibald Bradfield Woodley	
1929	Frederick Gibson	
1930	Frederick Gibson	
1931	Frederick Gibson	
1932	Albert Ernest Tombs	
1933	Albert Ernest Tombs	
1934	Albert Ernest Tombs	
1935	Albert Ernest Tombs	
1936	Albert Ernest Tombs	
1937	Arthur Meredith Wilson-Green	
1938	Arthur Meredith Wilson-Green	
1939	Arthur Meredith Wilson-Green	
1940	John Lacey West	
1941	John Lacey West	
1942	John Lyttleton Etty	
1943	John Lyttleton Etty	
1944	John Lyttleton Etty	
1945	Fred Stimpson	
1946	Fred Stimpson	
1947	Fred Stimpson	
1948	Fred Stimpson	
1949	Henry Booth	
1950	Agnes Leonora Challenor	
1951	Herbert George Mullard	
1952	Herbert George Mullard	
1953	Percy Holmes	
1954	Gerald Fitzgerald O'Connor	
1955	Harry James Polley	
1956	Cyril Gordon Stowe	
1957	Clement George Barber	
1958	Charles Edwin Gostling	
1959	Ernest Edward Sparkes	
1960	Constance May Cox	
1961	Bertram George Burrett	
1962	James Stewart Candy	
1963	Joseph Henry Stanley	
1964	Arthur Williams	
1965	Percy Lambert	
1966	John Jones	
1967	Reginald Alfred Rogers	
1968	Leslie Reginald Steggles	
1969	Samuel Jones	
1970	Harold Joseph Paxton	
1971	Joan Gladys Harcourt-Norris	
1972	Michael William Matthews	
1973	Harold Peter Merritt	
1974	Edward Raymond Staniland	
1975	William Liversidge	
1976	Ronald Riegelhult	
1977	Peter Thatcher	
1978	Ewart Hemmings	
1979	Pamela Walker	
1980	Nigel Trippett	
1981	Ada Dyson	
1982	Brian Jones	
1983	George Lewis	
1984	Wng Cdr James Blyth	
1985	Judith Vause	
1986	George Aird	
1987	Peter Spooner	
1988	Janet Morgan	
1989	Marilyn Badcock	
1990	Charles Michael Badcock	
1991	Maureen Varju	
1992	William Wivell	
1993	Rhoda 'Sue' Crane	
1994	Dr Colin Kemp	
1995	Dr James Alastair Halliday	
1996	Dr Vernon Spencer Butt	
1997	Julie Mayhew-Archer	
1998	Jeanette Rickus-Prosser	
1999	Audrey Mary Hasnip	
2000	Lesley Legge	
2001	David Allinson	
2002	Audrey Tamplin	
2003	Hilary Green	
2004	Keith George Hasnip	
2005	Alison Rooke	
2006	Peter Green	
2007	Lorraine Oates	
2008	Patrick Lonergan	
2009	Patricia Mary Hobby	
2010	Duncan Brown	
2011	Charles Michael Badcock	
2012	Monica Mary Lovatt	
2013	Samantha Bowring	
2014	Angela Lawrence	
2015	Helen Pighills	
2016	Alice Badcock	
2017	Janet Morter	
2018	Margaret Crick	
2019	Charlie Birks	
2020	Charlie Birks	
2021	Cheryl Briggs	
2022	Andy Foulsham	
