= Joseph Haythorne Reed =

British politician

Member of Parliament for Abingdon
- In office 13 December 1854 – 27 March 1857
- Preceded by: Montagu Bertie
- Succeeded by: John Thomas Norris

Personal details
- Born: 1828
- Died: 6 April 1858 (aged 29)
- Party: Whig

Major Joseph Haythorne Reed (1828 – 6 April 1858) was a British Whig politician.

Reed was elected Whig MP for Abingdon at a by-election in 1854—caused by the succession of Montagu Bertie to Earl of Abingdon—and held the seat until 1857 when he sought election unsuccessfully at Finsbury.

Parliament of the United Kingdom
Preceded by Lord Norreys	Member of Parliament for Abingdon; 1854–1857	Succeeded by John Thomas Norris
