= Harold Henderson (British politician) =

British politician

Lieutenant Colonel The Honourable Harold Greenwood Henderson CVO
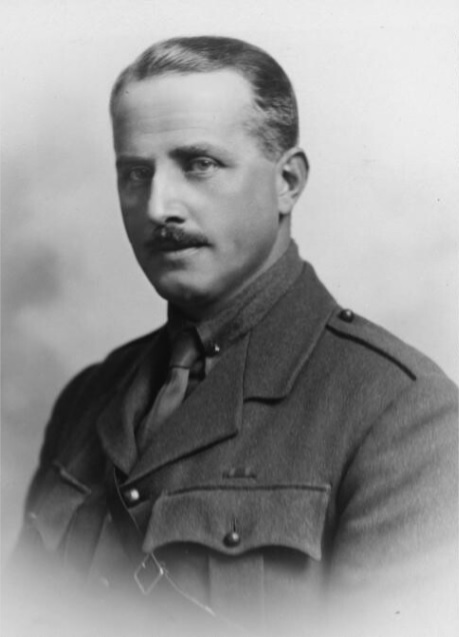

Member of Parliament for Abingdon (UK Parliament constituency)
- In office 15 January 1910 – 29 August 1916
- Preceded by: Edward Anthony Strauss
- Succeeded by: Archie Kirkman Loyd

Personal details
- Born: 29 October 1875 Brentford, London, England
- Died: 1 November 1922 (aged 47) Faringdon, Oxfordshire, England
- Party: Conservative
- Spouse: Lady Violet Charlotte Dalzell
- Children: Gavin Henderson, 2nd Baron Faringdon, Margaret, Michael, Roderick
- Parent(s): Alexander Henderson, 1st Baron Faringdon & Baroness Faringdon Jane Ellen Davis
- Education: Eton College

Harold Greenwood Henderson, CVO (29 October 1875 – 1 November 1922), was a British Conservative politician.

== Early life ==
Born in Brentford, Henderson was the eldest son of Alexander Henderson, 1st Baron Faringdon of Buscot Park in Berkshire (now Oxfordshire), and his wife Jane Ellen (née Davis). He was commissioned a second lieutenant in the 3rd (Militia) Battalion of the Royal Berkshire Regiment on 3 March 1894. He transferred to active service in the British Army when he was appointed a second lieutenant in the 1st Life Guards on 3 February 1897, and was promoted to lieutenant on 2 April 1898. With a detachment from his regiment, he served in the Second Boer War in South Africa 1899–1900, and received the Queen's South Africa Medal (with two clasps). After his return, he was on 6 September 1902 promoted to captain, and appointed adjutant of the regiment. After he resigned from the army, he received an appointment with the Territorial Army in the Berkshire Yeomanry.

== Political career ==
He sat as Member of Parliament for Abingdon from 1910 to 1916. Henderson resigned his seat on his appointment as military secretary to the Duke of Devonshire who was to become Governor General of Canada in November 1916.

== Personal life ==
Henderson married Lady Violet Charlotte Dalzell, daughter of Robert Dalzell, 11th Earl of Carnwath, in 1901. They lived at Kitemore House at Shellingford in Berkshire (now Oxfordshire). He died in November 1922, aged 47 in Faringdon, twelve years before the death of his father. He had four children and his eldest son, Alexander Gavin, succeeded in the barony in 1934.

He was on the governing body of Abingdon School from 1910 to 1916.

== Notes ==
Parliament of the United Kingdom
Preceded by Edward Strauss	Member of Parliament for Abingdon; 1910–1916	Succeeded by Archie Loyd
