= John Thomas Norris =

British politician

John Thomas Norris (1808 – 15 January 1870) was a British Liberal politician who served as the Member of Parliament (MP) for Abingdon 1857–65.

He was a Commissioner of Lieutenancy for London, a justice of the peace in Berkshire, and member of the London City Corporation.

Parliament of the United Kingdom
Preceded by Joseph Haythorne Reed	Member of Parliament for Abingdon; 1857 – 1865	Succeeded by Charles Lindsay
