= Shapurji Saklatvala =

British-Indian Communist Party MP (1874–1936)

Shapurji Dorabji Saklatvala MP
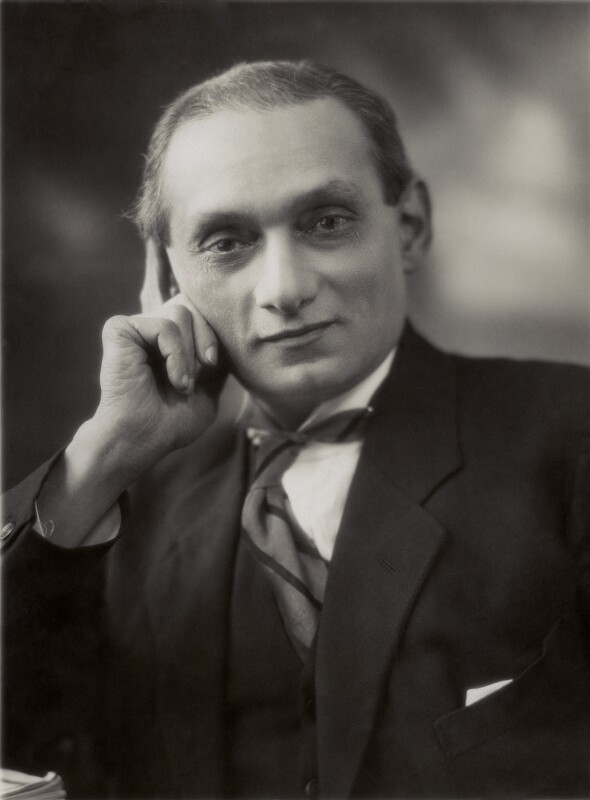
- Saklatvala in 1922

Member of Parliament for Battersea North
- In office 1924–1929
- Preceded by: Henry Hogbin
- Succeeded by: William Sanders
- Majority: 542 (1.8%)
- In office 1922–1923
- Preceded by: Richard Morris
- Succeeded by: Henry Hogbin
- Majority: 2,021 (9.5%)

Personal details
- Born: 28 March 1874 Bombay, Bombay Presidency, British India (now Mumbai, Maharashtra, India)
- Died: 16 January 1936 (aged 61) London, England
- Party: Communist (1921–1936)
- Other political affiliations: Independent Labour (1909–1921); Labour (1922–1923)
- Education: St. Xavier's College
- Profession: Lawyer

Shapurji Dorabji Saklatvala (28 March 1874 – 16 January 1936) was a communist and British politician of Indian Parsi heritage. He was the first person of Indian heritage to become a British Member of Parliament (MP) for the Labour Party and was also among the few members of the Communist Party of Great Britain (CPGB) to serve as an MP.

== Early years ==
Shapurji Saklatvala was born on 28 March 1874 in Bombay (now Mumbai), India, the son of a merchant, Dorabji Saklatvala, and his wife Jerbai, a sister of Jamsetji (aka J.N.) Tata, the owner of India's largest commercial and industrial empire. He was educated at St. Xavier's School in Bombay before moving to St. Xavier's College for his collegiate education.

He worked briefly as an iron and coal prospector for Tata successfully unearthing iron ore and coal deposits in the states of Jharkhand and Odisha (previously called Orissa). His health suffered with malaria which led to his moving to England in 1905 to convalesce and run Tata's Manchester office. He later joined Lincoln's Inn, although he left before qualifying as a barrister.

== Political career ==
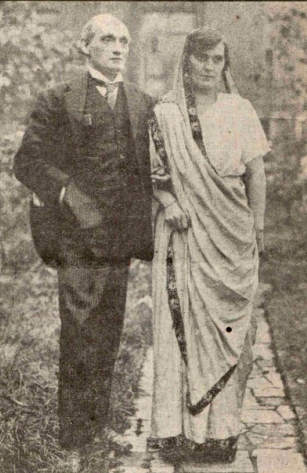
Saklatvala and his wife, c. 1936

Saklatvala was a committed socialist, and first joined the Independent Labour Party (ILP) in Manchester in 1909.

The Bolshevik Revolution in Russia of November 1917 was an inspiration to Saklatvala, and following the establishment of the Communist International in 1919, he became active in attempting to affiliate the ILP with that new organisation. Saklatvala joined with Emile Burns, R. Palme Dutt, J. Walton Newbold, Helen Crawfurd, and others as part of an organised faction called the Left Wing Group of the ILP which was dedicated to this effort. When the affiliation drive by Saklatvala and the ILP's left-wing failed in the party's March 1921 national conference, Saklatvala left the organisation with the others in the Left Wing Group to join the new Communist Party of Great Britain (CPGB).

He attended the 2nd Pan-African Congress held in Paris in 1921 as a delegate of the CPGB.

In the October 1922 general election, the Communist Party of Great Britain launched its first electoral campaign, putting forward candidates in six constituencies. Saklatvala ran in the Battersea North district of London, one of two Communists to receive the official endorsement of the Labour Party – which was in effect an umbrella organisation which included affiliated political parties like the ILP as well as representatives of various trade unions. Saklatvala won the election in North Battersea, receiving 11,311 votes – topping his nearest rival by more than 2,000 votes. Also elected running as a Communist, without official Labour Party support, was J. Walton Newbold, capturing a plurality of the vote in Motherwell.

Saklatvala was accepted into the Labour Party's parliamentary caucus, but while Newbold applied for the same, he was rejected. This did not stop Saklatvala and Newbold from joint activity, however, and the pair attempted to raise the demands of the unemployed and the cause of cheap housing and lower rents whenever possible. Newbold wound up being suspended from the House in May 1923 over his actions concerning the Curzon ultimatum during the French occupation of the Ruhr.

The November 1923 general election saw the CPGB putting forward 9 of its members as candidates, including Shapurji Saklatvala in Battersea North, where he was unanimously adopted as the nominee of the Battersea Labour Party. Although not all the Communist candidates were endorsed by the Labour Party, they all were the recipients of support from local Labour activists. Despite modest gains for Labour in the election overall, the results of the election returned the Conservatives as the largest party in the House of Commons (although their number of seats fell from 346 to 259). All Communist candidates were defeated in the 1923 election, however, including Saklatvala in Battersea North.

The 1924 general election came in the wake of the so-called Zinoviev letter and saw the Conservatives increase their vote by more than 2 million to win the election. The Labour Party saw a net loss of 42 seats despite contesting more constituencies than ever before. In Battersea North, Saklatvala ran without formal Labour Party endorsement for the first time, but still managed to win the election by a slim margin of 544 votes, the only one of 8 CPGB candidates elected.

Saklatvala was arrested during the 1926 General Strike following a speech he made in support of striking coal miners and was jailed for two months on the charge of sedition.

He was active in the League Against Imperialism from the time of its formation in 1927.

Saklatvala's parliamentary career was effectively ended when he lost his seat in the 1929 general election. He ran again in 1930 in a by-election in Glasgow Shettleston without success and mounted a final losing campaign in the 1931 general election in Battersea.

In 1934 he visited the Soviet Union to tour the Union's Far Eastern republics, whose governance he compared favourably to that in British India. During that tour, he suffered a heart attack but recovered.

During the 1935 general election Saklatvala was active in the electoral campaigns of Harry Pollitt and Willie Gallacher.

Saklavata was also a supporter of Irish independence, forming a relationship with Art O'Brien and other Sinn Féin political figures based in Britain and Ireland such as Éamon de Valera who saw Indian independence and Irish independence as one and the same.

== Personal life ==
On 14 August 1907 Saklatvala married an English woman, Sarah Elizabeth Marsh (born 1888). She was working as a hotel waitress when he met her while staying at Matlock, Derbyshire. The couple had three sons; Dorab, Beram, and Kaikhoshro (also called Kaiko), and two daughters; Dhunbar and Jevanbai (also known as Candida or Candy and Sehri). He was once censured by the non-religious CPGB for holding a Zoroastrian navjote initiation ceremony for his children at Caxton Hall, Westminster, which he defended on the grounds it was to ensure benefit from a Tata family trust fund.

His son Kaikhoshro served with the British Air Transport Auxiliary organisation in World War II as a pilot (Second Officer). He flew most frontline aircraft, including Mosquitos, Spitfires and Lancasters.

== Death and legacy ==
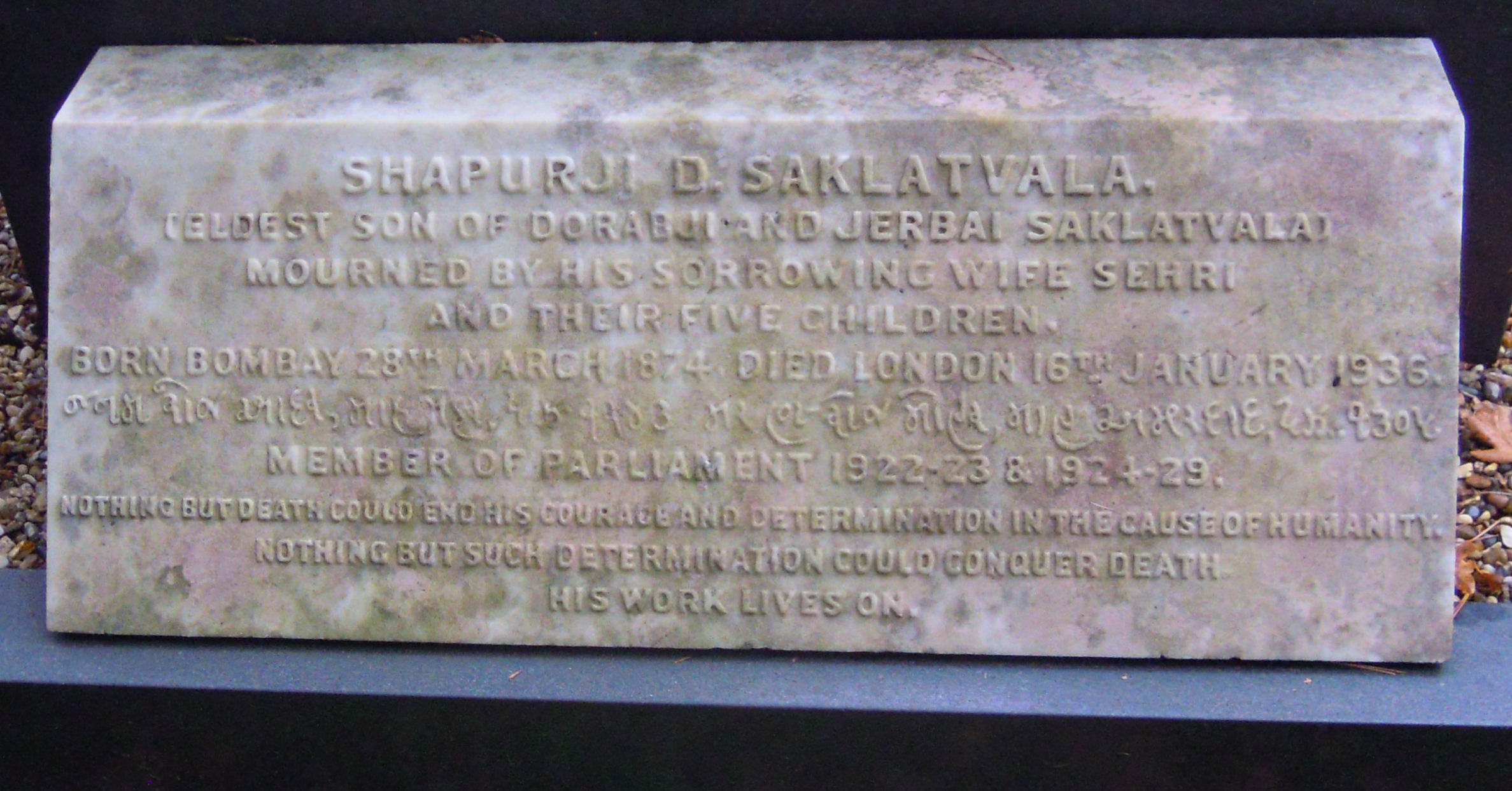
Memorial to Shapurji Saklatvala on his mother's tomb in Brookwood Cemetery

Saklatvala died, from another heart attack, on 16 January 1936 at his London home, 2 St Albans Villas, St Albans Road. He was 61 years old at the time of his death and was cremated at Golders Green Crematorium. His remains were later buried on 21 January in the tomb of his mother at the Parsi burial ground in Brookwood Cemetery, Woking.

In January 1937, British, Irish and Dominion volunteers in the International Brigades were formed into an English-speaking battalion, that was formally named after Saklatvala. However, the name never caught on, and it was normally known as the "British Battalion".

The Communist Party of Great Britain (Marxist–Leninist)'s hall is named after Shapurji Saklatvala. Saklatvala Hall is located in Southall, London. The hall is used for CPGB-ML's meetings and celebrations.

== Works ==
- The Empire Labour. 1919.
- For British Trade Unionists and British Indian Labour: Two Articles on British Capital and Indian Labour. Manchester: National Labour Press, n.d. [1920].
- India in the Labour World. London: Labour Publishing Co. for the Workers' Welfare League of India, n.d. [c. 1921].
- Saklatwala on India. Lahore: G.L. Puri, 1923.
- The Class Struggle in Parliament: On Communism, Egyptian Indemnity, the Supplementary Reserve, the Prince's Tour, the Air Force. London: S. Saklatvala, n.d. [c. 1925].
- British Imperialism in India: Speech Delivered in the House of Commons, 9 July 1925. Chicago: Daily Worker Publishing Co., n.d. [1925].
- Is India Different? The Class Struggle in India: Correspondence on the Indian Labour Movement and Modern Conditions. With Mahatma Gandhi. London: Communist Party of Great Britain, 1927.
- Socialism and "Labouralism": A Speech in the House of Commons. London: Communist Party of Great Britain, 1928.
- With the Communist Party in Parliament: Exposure of Parliamentary Hypocrisy: Saklatvala's Great Speech on King's Address, 7 November 1928. London: Communist Party of Great Britain, n.d. [c. 1928].

== See also ==
- Politics of the United Kingdom
- British Asians in politics of the United Kingdom
- Dadabhai Naoroji
- Mancherjee Bhownagree

== Footnotes ==
Parliament of the United Kingdom
Preceded by Richard Morris	Member of Parliament for Battersea North; 1922 – 23	Succeeded by Henry Cairn Hogbin
Preceded by Henry Cairn Hogbin	Member of Parliament for Battersea North; 1924 – 29	Succeeded by William Sanders
