= Walton Newbold =

British politician (1888–1943)

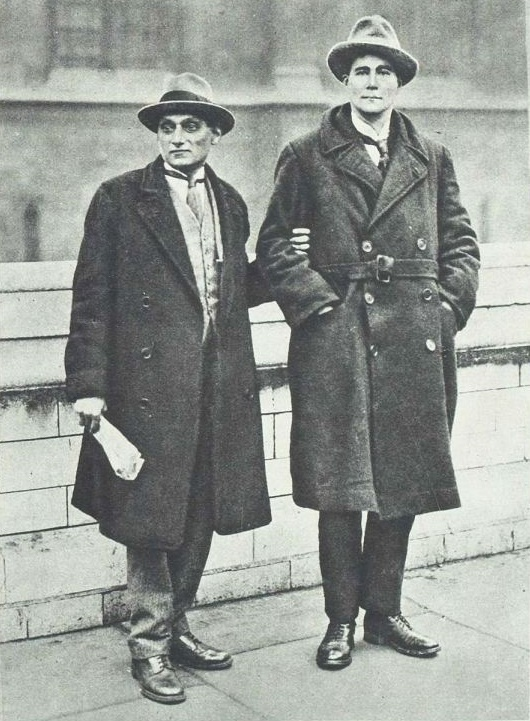
- Shapurji Saklatvala (left) with Walton Newbold
- Born: John Turner Walton Newbold; 8 May 1888; Culcheth, Lancashire, England
- Died: 20 February 1943 (aged 54)
- Education: Buxton College, University of Manchester
- Known for: First Communist Party of Great Britain MP; WWI Conscientious objector

John Turner Walton Newbold (8 May 1888 – 20 February 1943), generally known as Walton Newbold, was the first of the four Communist Party of Great Britain members to be elected as MPs in the United Kingdom.

== Biography ==
=== Early years ===
John Turner Walton Newbold was born in Culcheth, Lancashire, on 8 May 1888, and was educated at Buxton College and the University of Manchester.

On leaving university, Newbold lectured in history and politics, and was engaged in industrial and economic research. In 1908, he joined the Fabian Society, connected with the Labour Party, and then the Independent Labour Party (ILP) in 1910. In line with the ILP's pacifist position on World War I, he joined the No Conscription Fellowship, and was a conscientious objector, although he was in any case found physically unfit for military service. He did a great deal of research into the arms trade and its international connections in the late 19th/early 20th centuries. Whilst still a research student, he married fellow socialist Marjory Neilson on 16 June 1916.

=== Political career ===
In 1917 Newbold joined the Labour educational Plebs' League and the British Socialist Party (BSP). He had a number of articles published in The Call, the paper of the BSP. By 1920, he was a committed communist, stating "my loyalty, at any rate, is now – as it has been for two and a half years – first and foremost to the position of the Third International". In 1921 he resigned from the ILP and joined the Communist Party of Great Britain, becoming a member of its first central committee.

In the 1922 general election, Newbold was elected to represent the Motherwell constituency in the House of Commons. Locally his wife Marjory was well known in working class and socialist groups, from leading socialist Sunday schools, and adult education and campaigns, and some say he was supported because he was 'Madge's man'. Newbold received the support of the Labour Party, but unlike many other Communist candidates, including Shapurji Saklatvala who was elected in the same general election, he stood under the label "Communist". Additionally, he was refused permission to take the Labour whip and to sit with the Labour group. As such, he is sometimes counted as the first Communist MP in Britain, although others cite Cecil L'Estrange Malone, who switched from the Liberal Party in 1920, as the first Communist MP.

Saklatvala was accepted into the Labour Party's parliamentary caucus but while Newbold applied for the same he was rejected. This did not stop Saklatvala and Newbold from joint activity, however, and the pair attempted to raise the demands of the unemployed and the cause of cheap housing and lower rents whenever possible. Newbold wound up being suspended from the House in May 1923 over his actions with respect to the Curzon ultimatum during the French occupation of the Ruhr.

Newbold was sometimes seen as ineffective in Parliament, mocked by many other MPs for his old and frequently dirty clothing, but focused on producing propaganda for the Communist Party. He lost his seat in the 1923 general election, after just over a year in Parliament. Increasingly disillusioned with communism, he resigned from the party in 1924 and rejoined the Labour Party. In 1928 Newbold joined the Social Democratic Federation, and edited its journal, Social Democrat, from 1929 until 1931, when he supported the National Labour split from Labour.

He stood unsuccessfully as the Labour candidate in Epping in the 1929 general election. In the same year he was appointed to the Macmillan Enquiry into the operation of banking in the UK.

=== Death and legacy ===
Newbold died in February 1943, aged 54.

== List of works ==
- 1916: How Europe Armed for War 1871 - 1914
- 1917: Socialism and Militarism
- 1917: Capitalism and Imperialism
- 1920: Impression of the Communist Unity Convention
- 1922: Egypt and the Entente
- 1922: What is the League of Nations—Anyway?
- 1923: Communism & the Labour Party
- 1923: The Political Situation in Great Britain
- 1933: Democracy, Debts and Disarmament

== Sources consulted ==
- Enemy Within the Empire, Australian League of Rights
- The tasks awaiting the Communist Party, Weekly Worker
- A. J. P. Taylor - revisionism, age-of-the-sage.org
- Revolutionaries and the Labour Party, Duncan Hallas

Parliament of the United Kingdom
Preceded by Robert Nelson	Member of Parliament for Motherwell; 1922–1923	Succeeded by Hugh Ferguson
Media offices
Preceded by Tom Kennedy?	Editor of the Social Democrat; 1929–1931	Succeeded by William Sampson Cluse
