= 1982 Coatbridge and Airdrie by-election =

UK by-election

- 24 June 1982

Constituency of Coatbridge and Airdrie
- Turnout: 56.3% ▼19.0%
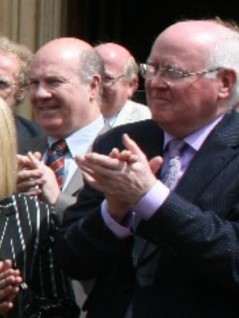
	First party	Second party
		Con
Candidate	Tom Clarke	Hugo de Burgh
Party	Labour	Conservative
Popular vote	19,208	9,118
Percentage	55.1%	26.2%
Swing	▼5.8%	▼1.3%
	Third party	Fourth party
	SNP	Lib
Candidate	Ron Wyllie	Sandy Henderson
Party	SNP	Liberal
Popular vote	3,652	2,873
Percentage	10.5%	8.2%
Swing	▼1.1%	New
MP before election
James Dempsey
Labour
Subsequent MP
Tom Clarke
Labour

The 1982 Coatbridge and Airdrie by-election was a parliamentary by-election held on 24 June 1982 for the UK House of Commons constituency of Coatbridge and Airdrie.

== Previous MP ==
The seat fell vacant when the constituency's Labour Member of Parliament (MP), James Dempsey (6 February 1917 – 12 May 1982) died.

He was a clerk with a haulage firm and a councillor on Lanarkshire County Council from 1945. He later worked as a lecturer on political economy and a writer on local government.

Dempsey was Member of Parliament for Coatbridge and Airdrie from 1959.

== Candidates ==
Four candidates were nominated. The list below is set out in descending order of the number of votes received at the by-election.

1. Representing the Labour Party was Tom Clarke, born in Coatbridge on 10 January 1941.

He had been assistant director of the Scottish Council for Education Technology. He had become a deputy director of the Scottish Film Council, where he had written the synopses for the film library catalogue. He had also been president of the British Amateur Cinematographers Central Council (based in Epsom) and organised the Scottish International Amateur Film Festival. He became a councillor on the Coatbridge Town Council aged 23 in 1964 where he served until it was abolished in 1974, and then became a member for its replacement the Monklands District Council until he was elected to parliament in 1982.

As a result of a series of boundary changes Clarke was MP for Coatbridge and Airdrie 1982 – 1983, for Monklands West 1983 – 1997, for Coatbridge and Chryston 1997 – 2005 and for Coatbridge, Chryston and Bellshill from 2005 until 2015.

2. The Conservative nominee was Hugo de Burgh.

3. The Scottish National Party candidate was Ron Wyllie. He also contested Carrick, Cumnock and Doon Valley in the 1983 general election.

4. The Liberal Party candidate, representing the SDP–Liberal Alliance, was Sandy Henderson.

== Previous result ==
General election 1979: Coatbridge and Airdrie
Party	Candidate	Votes	%	±%
Labour	James Dempsey	27,598	60.9	+9.3
Conservative	John Love	12,442	27.5	+10.3
SNP	M. Johnston	3,652	11.6	−16.3
Majority		15,156	33.4	+9.7
Turnout		43,692	75.3	
Registered electors		60,133		
Labour hold		Swing		

- Death of James Dempsey

== Result ==
By-election 24 June 1982: Coatbridge and Airdrie
Party	Candidate	Votes	%	±%
Labour	Tom Clarke	19,208	55.1	−5.8
Conservative	Hugo de Burgh	9,118	26.2	−1.3
SNP	Ron Wyllie	3,652	10.5	−1.1
Liberal	Sandy Henderson	2,873	8.2	New
Majority		10,090	28.9	−4.5
Turnout		34,951	56.3	−19.0
Registered electors		61,876		
Labour hold		Swing		

== Aftermath ==
Scottish political journalist William Clark, writing in the following day's edition of the Glasgow Herald, stated that the "major upset from the poll" was that the SNP and Liberal candidates both lost their deposits. In the same article Clark called the result "a disastrous blow" for the SDP–Liberal Alliance, particular as it came soon after Roy Jenkins victory for the SDP in the Glasgow Hillhead by-election. He predicted that the result would "guarantee an uphill struggle" in Scotland for the Alliance for some time to come.

This was the SNP's second lost deposit in two by-elections, following a similar result in Hillhead earlier in the year. Clark considered it a poor result and predicted it could lead to divisions between the Party's right and left-wings. He cited in evidence the fact that senior vice-president of the party Jim Sillars had said the bill for the lost deposit should be sent to party rival, the former MP and serving MEP, Winnie Ewing.

== See also ==
- Coatbridge and Airdrie constituency
- Lists of United Kingdom by-elections
- United Kingdom by-election records
