= Coatbridge and Chryston =

Coatbridge and Chryston may refer to:

- Coatbridge and Chryston (UK Parliament constituency)
- Coatbridge and Chryston (Scottish Parliament constituency)
