= Sino-Soviet conflict (1929) =

1929 border conflict between the Soviet Union and the Republic of China

- Part of interwar period
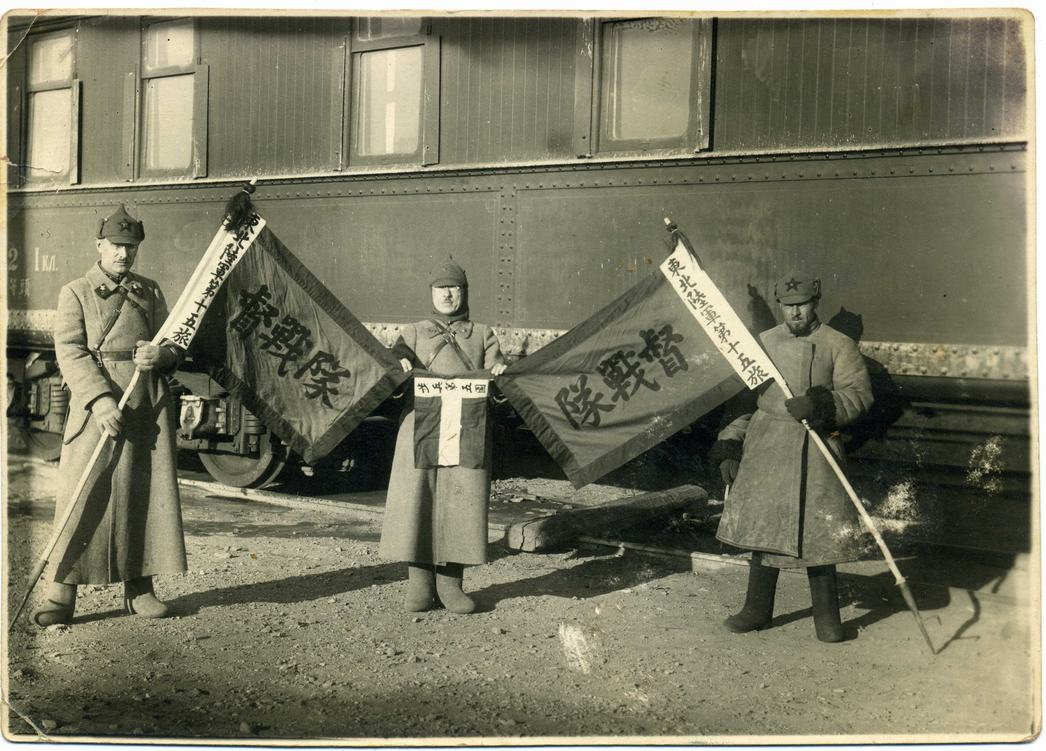
- Red Army commanders with captured Kuomintang banners
Date	July–December 1929
Location	Manchuria
Result	Soviet victory; Provisions of 1924 agreement upheld; Khabarovsk Protocol signed; The Soviet/Russian military occupation of the entire Tarabarov and Bolshoy Ussuriysky islands until 2008

Belligerents
China; Russian White movement	Soviet Union

Commanders and leaders
Zhang Xueliang; Vladimir Kislitsin	Vasily Blyukher; Kliment Voroshilov

Units involved
Northeastern Army; White émigré volunteers; White guerrilla groups; Nazarov detachment; Dutov-Pozdnikov White Guard band; Nechaev detachment	Special Red Banner Far Eastern Army; 18th Rifle Corps; 19th Rifle Corps; 21st Rifle Division; 12th Rifle Division; Soviet Air Forces detachments; OGPU Border Guard detachments; Amur Military Flotilla

Strength
c. 200,000; 3,000+ Whites	c. 113,000 (peak)

Casualties and losses
Official Chinese accounts: 2,000 killed, 1,000 wounded, 8,550 captured; Modern estimate: c. 5,000 lost	Official Soviet accounts: 812 killed, 665 wounded, 4 missing; Modern estimate: Far more than officially reported

The Sino-Soviet conflict of 1929 (Chinese: 中東路事件; Russian: Конфликт на Китайско-Восточной железной дороге, lit. 'Conflict on the Chinese Eastern Railway') was an armed conflict between the Soviet Union and the Chinese warlord Zhang Xueliang of the Republic of China over the Chinese Eastern Railway (also known as the CER).

The conflict was the first major combat test of the reformed Soviet Red Army, which was organized along the latest professional lines, and ended with the mobilization and deployment of 156,000 troops to the Manchurian border. Combining the active-duty strength of the Red Army and border guards with the call-up of the Far East reserves, approximately one in five Soviet soldiers was sent to the frontier, the largest Red Army combat force to be fielded between the Russian Civil War (1917–1922) and the Soviet Union's entry to the Winter War (1939–1940).

In 1929, the Chinese Northeastern Army took over the Chinese Eastern Railway to regain sole control of it. The Soviet Union quickly responded with a military intervention and eventually forced the Chinese to return the railway to the previous format of joint administration. During the conflict, the Soviets gained full control of the Tarabarov and Bolshoy Ussuriysky islands (Chinese: 银龙岛 and 黑瞎子岛 respectively) from China, and the military occupation of these islands continued until the 2004 Sino-Russian Border Agreement, in which Russia agreed to return Tarabarov Island and the western half of Bolshoy Ussuriysky Island to China in 2008.

== Background ==
On July 25, 1919, the Soviet government's Assistant Commissar of Foreign Affairs, Lev Karakhan, had issued a manifesto to the Chinese government that promised the return of the Chinese Eastern Railway (CER) to Chinese control at no financial cost. On August 26, a revised version of the Karakhan Manifesto was published by the Soviet press, but the document mentioned neither the return of CER to the Chinese nor the lack of financial compensation.

Along with the original Karakhan telegram, the Chinese had the Vilenski pamphlet as evidence. The Vilenski pamphlet also showed the Chinese that the Soviets were willing to transfer the CER to the Chinese without compensation. The July 25 Karakhan telegram showed that the Soviets' original intention was to return the CER to Chinese control without compensation. The July 25 telegram satisfied the diplomatic requirements for the Chinese government, but the August 26 one was published to uphold Soviet propaganda requirements.

The first major step in uncovering the hostile takeover of the CER by the Chinese in 1929 started with the understanding of the Secret Protocol of March 14, 1924, and the Secret Agreement of September 20, 1924. The Secret Protocol stated that all former conventions, treaties, protocols, contracts, and documents between the Soviet and China would be annulled until a conference could convene. That made all treaties, border relations, and commercial relations dependent on the upcoming conference. That in turn gave the Soviets time to turn to Zhang Xueliang in Manchuria, who was the strongest warlord there. He had control of the Mukden government in the city that is now known as Shenyang. The Soviets were the first to propose joint management of the CER with the Chinese, but Zhang stood in the way of the joint management. The Soviets decided to make a deal with Zhang.

On May 31, 1924, Lev Karakhan and Dr. V. K. Wellington Koo, the Minister of Foreign Affairs for the Republic of China, signed a Sino-Soviet treaty that included multiple articles, which played right into the Soviets' hands because Article V stated that "the employment of persons in the various departments of the railway shall be in accordance with the principle of equal representation between the nationals of the Union of Soviet Socialist Republics and those of the Republic of China." The Soviets added, "In carrying out the principle of equal representation the normal course of life and activities of the Railway shall in no case be interrupted or injured, that is to say the employment of both nationalities shall be in accordance with experience, personal qualifications and fitness of applicants."

While negotiations had been concluded with the Chinese, the Soviets turned to make a deal with Zhang. They promised him full control of choosing the Chinese officials who would be on the board in the joint Chinese-Soviet management of the CER, which would give him half control of CER. On September 20, 1924, he signed the Secret Agreement without knowing the Chinese government had signed the Secret Protocol earlier in the year. Since the CER was originally controlled by the Soviets, most of the positions would be under Soviet control. The Soviets then claimed they should keep majority control because any other solution would interrupt or injure the railway.

The Soviets were also the puppet master of the President for the CER. They regained majority control of the CER by playing the secret protocols off one another and by outmaneuvering the Chinese. The Soviets allowed the Chinese to think they were adding workers loyal to their government. However, in reality, the Soviets were creating more jobs on the railway and hiring Soviet workers. In the end, the Soviets controlled 67% of all positions on the CER.

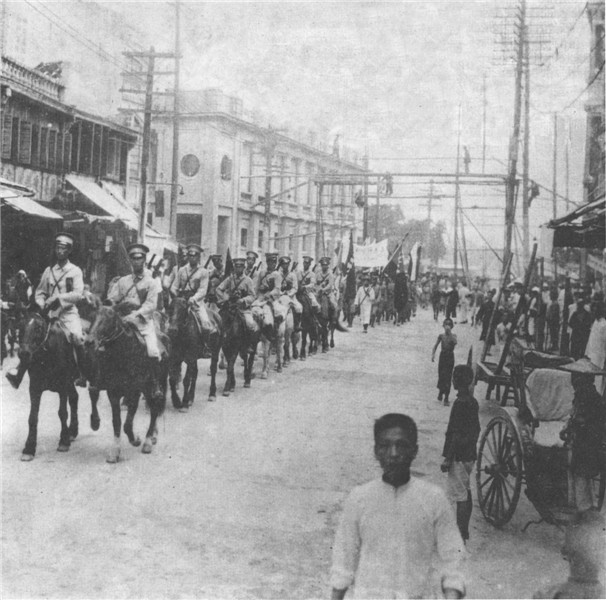
Chinese cavalry in Harbin, 1929

The Chinese entertained joint management until mid-1929. The change from Soviet to Chinese control started when the Chinese authorities made a radical move to try to remove Soviet management. Chinese authorities stormed the Soviet consulate in Harbin and arrested the General Manager of the CER, his assistant, and other Soviet citizens and removed them from power in the CER. The Soviets retaliated by arresting Chinese citizens in the Soviet Union. On July 13, 1929, the Soviets sent their formal demands to the Chinese on what was happening on the CER.

On July 19, the Soviets discontinued their diplomatic relations with the Chinese, suspended railway communication, and demanded for all Chinese diplomats to leave Soviet territory.

By July 20, the Soviets were transferring their funds to New York. In the cities of Suifenhe and Lahususa, the Soviets were terrorizing the Chinese civilians by having their warships' guns pointed at the city and by having their planes make flybys. Many members of the Soviet leadership such as Kliment Voroshilov urged for a military intervention, but General Secretary Joseph Stalin initially hesitated for fear a Japanese reaction to a Soviet invasion of Manchuria. However, the Soviet consul general in Tokyo obtained information according to which Japan would stay out of the conflict if the Soviets limited any invasions to northern Manchuria and so Stalin decided to act.

On August 6, the Soviet Union created the Special Red Banner Far Eastern Army, commanded by Vasily Blyukher, with the assistance of Voroshilov. Around a fifth of the entire Soviet Armed Forces was mobilized to participate or assist the operation. By doing so, they were willing to do whatever it took to return the CER back to their control. The Chinese leadership was surprised by that turn of events, as it had not expected the Soviets to react so aggressively.

Zhang quickly enlisted more troops, most importantly thousands of anticommunist Russians who lived as White émigrés in Manchuria. Some of the Whites even organized guerrilla groups to carry the war into the Soviet Union.

== Conflict ==
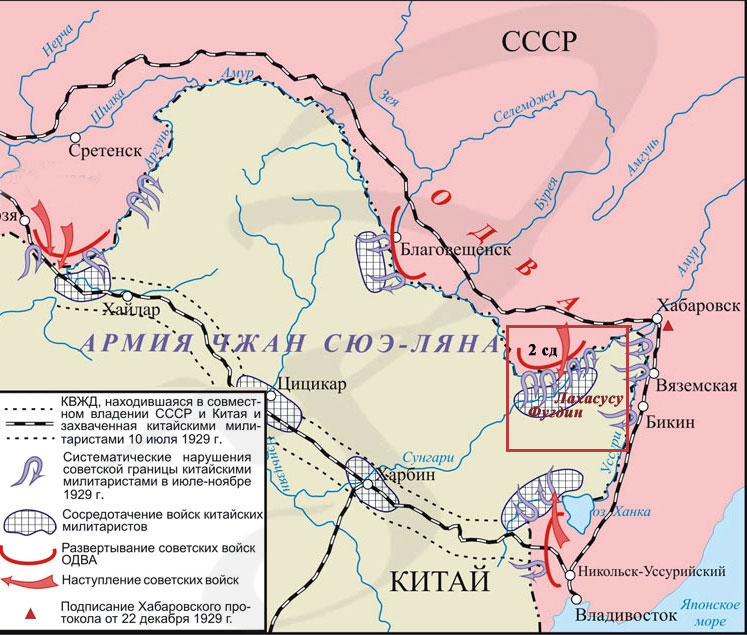
Map of the Chinese Eastern Railway region (in Russian) showing military operations in 1929

Small skirmishes had broken out in July but would not be considered the first major military action. The first battle happened on August 17, 1929, when the Soviets attacked Chalainor. Chinese troops retreated to an entrenchment, which was supported by machine guns. The Soviets suffered heavy losses in the battle, the only one in which the Soviets would incur such casualties.

Blyukher consequently developed a plan for an offensive in two rapid operations, the first targeting Chinese naval forces and the second destroying the Chinese ground forces by rapid encirclement operations.

The naval attack began in October, as the Soviets forced their river flotilla up the Amur and Songhua Rivers and captured Lahasusu (the Nanai toponym for Tongjiang, Heilongjiang). The maneuver caused the Chinese to move to a different location. On their way to Fujin, Chinese troops killed any civilian they met and raided any store.

The Soviets stated that they would not touch the civilian population and encouraged Chinese civilians to fight alongside them against the Chinese Army. They also denied killing civilians and were said to take only military goods. All civilian personal items were to be left in place, a stipulation that was strictly enforced.

On November 17, the Soviets decided to take ten divisions and split their attack into two stages. The first stage was to go past Manzhouli and to attack the region of Chalainor. After capturing the region, Soviet troops set their sights on Manzhouli.

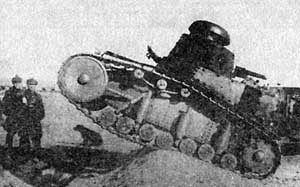
A Soviet T-18 tank deployed during the conflict

When they reached Manzhouli, they found that the Chinese were not prepared for battle and that the Chinese forces were looting houses and stores, stealing civilian clothes, and trying to escape. The Soviet strategy was a success. On November 26, the Chinese were ready to sign a treaty with the Soviets. On December 13, after much debate, the Chinese signed the Khabarovsk Protocol, which restored peace and the status quo ante bellum, the Sino-Soviet treaty of 1924.

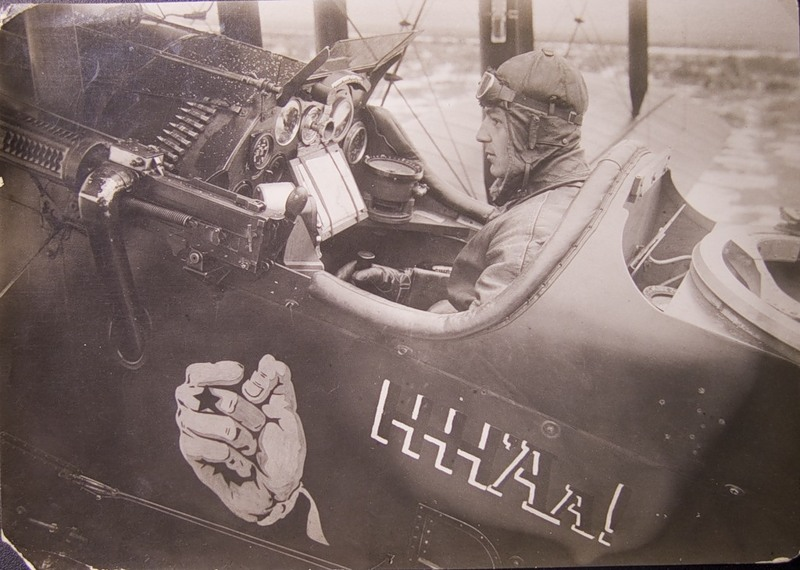
A Soviet Air Forces pilot in a Polikarpov R-1 cockpit during the conflict (Note: A Soviet fist and the stylized Russian caption Н-Н'Аа! (lit. 'Take thaaat!') on the fuselage are elements taken from a propaganda poster responding to the Curzon Ultimatum of 1923.)

The victory over China was an eyeopener for the world. During the conflict, the Soviets used propaganda to help spread communist ideology and to confuse the Chinese Army by using radio and leaflets. They did so by deceiving the Chinese command on the town that was the Soviets' next target: "Its military forces combined carefully measured use of depth and variety, coordinated in the fashion of a swift action design to achieve the precise goal of annihilating offensive under complex conditions' against enemy forces."

Stalin boasted to Vyacheslav Molotov that "our fellows from the Far East Army gave [the Chinese] a good scare." The conflict brought a sense of military prestige back into the Asian region. The Soviet victory was also applauded by such Western nations as the United States, France, and the United Kingdom. It showed the West that the Soviets could use both diplomacy and military might to achieve its goal.

However, while some might have applauded the Soviets for using those techniques, others feared them in a legitimate concern. The Western nations were frightened that might mean the Soviet Union might one day be able to beat a Western nation at its own game.

The impact of the conflict left the region in a power vacuum, which left the door wide open for the Japanese to take control of the region. After observing how easily Soviet forces had beaten the Chinese, the Japanese used a similar technique to defeat the Chinese and occupied Manchuria after the Mukden Incident in 1931.

== Aftermath ==
When Japan invaded Manchuria in 1931 and occupied the Soviet sphere of influence, the Soviet Union was still not strong enough in the East to oppose the Japanese. Stalin adopted a policy of strict neutrality, and the Soviet Union sold its rights to the Chinese Eastern Railway to the Manchukuo government on March 23, 1935.

=== Deportation of Chinese ===
In 1928, Arsenyev Mikhail Mikhailovich (Арсеньев Михаил Михайлович), Staff Colonel of Red Army Headquarter, submitted a report to the Far Eastern Bureau that advised that free migration from China and Korea in the areas bordering the countries should be stopped and that the area should be filled with migrants from Siberia and Europe instead.

As the Sino-Soviet conflict over the Chinese Eastern Railway worsened bilateral relations, the Soviet government began to stop Chinese crossing the border since 1931. All Soviet diplomats in China were called back, all Chinese diplomats to Soviet Union were expelled, and trains between both countries were forced out of service.

The Soviets forced the Chinese to move to Northeast China. Thousands of Chinese in Irkutsk, Chita, and Ulan-Ude were arrested for breach of local orders, tax evasion, and other reasons. When they left Russia, any Chinese to cross the border with more than 30 rubles in cash had to pay the surplus to the authorities. If they had at least 1,000 rubles in cash, they would arrested and have all of their money confiscated.

Large numbers of Chinese were detained, according to the Shanghai-based newspaper Shen Bao on July 24, 1929, which said that "around a thousand Chinese who lived in Vladivostok were detained by the Soviet authorities. They were all said to be bourgeoisie." On August 12, the newspaper stated that there were still 1,600–1,700 Chinese in a Vladivostok prison, who were supplied with a piece of rye bread daily and suffered various forms of torture. On August 26, the newspaper stated that those detained in Khabarovsk had only a bread soup for meal daily, and many people had hanged themselves because of unbearable starvation. On September 14, the newspaper stated that 1,000 of Chinese in Vladivostok had been arrested, with almost no Chinese remaining in the city. On September 15, the newspaper continued that Vladivostok had arrested more than 1,000 Chinese on September 8–9 and that there were more than 7,000 Chinese in the city's prison. On September 21, the newspaper said that "the government in Russian Far East cheated the arrested Chinese, and forced them to construct the railway between Heihe and Khabarovsk. The forced workers had only two pieces of rye bread to eat daily. If they work with any delay, they will be whipped, making them at the edge of living and dead."

Although after signing the Treaty of Khabarovsk, the Soviet government released most of the arrested Chinese. The Chinese had been severely tortured by the Soviet government, the confiscated possessions of the Chinese were not returned, difficult situations had arisen among the workers and the businessmen, and there were high prices of goods and unaffordable living costs. Those factors caused all of the released Chinese to return to China.

== See also ==
- Kumul Rebellion
- Soviet invasion of Xinjiang
- Islamic rebellion in Xinjiang (1937)
- Ili Rebellion
- Beitashan Incident

== Sources ==
- Bisher, Jamie (2005). White Terror: Cossack Warlords of the Trans-Siberian. London, New York City: Routledge.
- Elleman; Bruce A.; "The Soviet Union's Secret Diplomacy Concerning the Chinese Eastern Railway, 1924–1925"; Journal of Asian Studies, Vol. 53 (1994), S. 459–68.
- Jowett, Philip S. (2017). The Bitter Peace. Conflict in China 1928–37. Stroud: Amberley Publishing. ISBN 978-1445651927.
- Lensen, George Alexander; The Damned Inheritance. The Soviet Union and the Manchurian Crises. 1924–1935, Ann Arbor 1974.
- Patrikeeff, Felix; Elleman, Bruce A.; Kotkin, Stephen; Railway as Political Catalyst: The Chinese Eastern Railway and the 1929 Sino-Soviet Conflict, in: Manchurian Railways and the Opening of China: An International History Basingstoke 2002, ISBN 0-333-73018-6
- Patrikeeff, Felix; Russian Politics in Exile: The Northeast Asian Balance of Power, 1924–1931, in: Manchurian Railways and the Opening of China: An International History, Basingstoke 2002, ISBN 0-333-73018-6
- Walker, Michael; The 1929 Sino-Soviet War; Lawrence, Kansas, 2017 (University Press of Kansas).
- Kotkin, Stephen (2017). Stalin: Waiting for Hitler, 1929-1941. New York: Penguin. ISBN 978-1-59420-380-0.
