= Coatbridge (UK Parliament constituency) =

Parliamentary constituency in the United Kingdom, 1918–1950

- Former burgh constituency for the House of Commons
- Subdivisions of Scotland: Lanarkshire

1918–1950
- Seats: One
- Created from: North East Lanarkshire
- Replaced by: Coatbridge & Airdrie

Coatbridge was a parliamentary constituency represented in the House of Commons of the Parliament of the United Kingdom. It returned one Member of Parliament (MP) from 1918 to 1950, elected by the first past the post voting system.

It was formed by the division of Lanarkshire. The name was changed in 1950 to Coatbridge and Airdrie. A later constituency, Coatbridge and Chryston, existed between 1997 and 2005, until it was redrawn as Coatbridge, Chryston and Bellshill.

== Boundaries ==
The Representation of the People Act 1918 provided that the constituency was to consist of "the burghs of Coatbridge and Airdrie".

== Members of Parliament ==
Election	Member	Party
1918	Arthur Louis Hamilton Buchanan	Coalition Conservative
1922	James C. Welsh	Labour
1931	William Templeton	Conservative
1935	James Barr	Labour
1945	Jean Mann	Labour
1950	constituency abolished: see Coatbridge & Airdrie	

== Election results ==
=== Elections in the 1910s ===
General election 1918: Coatbridge
Party		Candidate	Votes	%	±%
C	Unionist	Arthur Buchanan	13,188	64.51	
	Labour	Owen Coyle	7,254	35.49	
Majority			5,934	29.02	
Turnout			20,442	64.78	
Registered electors			31,557		
	Unionist win (new seat)				

=== Elections in the 1920s ===
General election 1922: Coatbridge
Party	Candidate	Votes	%	±%
Labour	James C. Welsh	12,038	49.01	+13.52
Unionist	Arthur Buchanan	9,724	39.59	−24.92
Liberal	Daniel Blades	2,802	11.41	New
Majority		2,314	9.42	N/A
Turnout		24,564	80.14	+15.36
Registered electors		30,650		
Labour gain from Unionist		Swing	+19.22	

General election 1923: Coatbridge
Party	Candidate	Votes	%	±%
Labour	James C. Welsh	12,292	55.48	+6.47
Unionist	J.B. Young	9,865	44.52	+4.93
Majority		2,427	10.96	+1.54
Turnout		22,157	71.72	−8.42
Registered electors		30,892		
Labour hold		Swing	+0.77	

General election 1924: Coatbridge
Party	Candidate	Votes	%	±%
Labour	James C. Welsh	12,782	50.11	−5.37
Unionist	Thomas Moore	12,725	49.89	+5.37
Majority		57	0.22	−10.74
Turnout		25,507	84.03	+12.31
Registered electors		30,356		
Labour hold		Swing	−5.37	

General election 1929: Coatbridge
Party	Candidate	Votes	%	±%
Labour	James C. Welsh	16,879	54.98	+4.87
Unionist	Alec Douglas-Home	9,210	30.00	−19.89
Liberal	Robert Irvine	4,610	15.02	New
Majority		7,669	24.98	+24.76
Turnout		30,699	82.31	−1.72
Registered electors		37,299		
Labour hold		Swing	+12.38	

=== Elections in the 1930s ===
General election 1931: Coatbridge
Party	Candidate	Votes	%	±%
Unionist	William Templeton	16,223	51.31	+21.31
Labour	James C. Welsh	14,722	46.56	−8.42
New Party	William Weir Gilmour	674	2.13	New
Majority		1,501	4.75	N/A
Turnout		31,619	83.40	+1.09
Registered electors		37,911		
Unionist gain from Labour		Swing	+14.87	

General election 1935: Coatbridge
Party	Candidate	Votes	%	±%
Labour	James Barr	17,535	57.20	+10.64
Unionist	T.D.K. Murray	13,121	42.80	−8.51
Majority		4,414	14.40	N/A
Turnout		30,656	78.55	−4.85
Registered electors		39,029		
Labour gain from Unionist		Swing	+9.58	

=== Elections in the 1940s ===
General election 1945: Coatbridge
Party	Candidate	Votes	%	±%
Labour	Jean Mann	18,619	61.12	+3.92
Unionist	Ronald Russell	11,842	38.88	−3.92
Majority		6,777	22.24	+7.84
Turnout		30,461	75.96	−2.59
Registered electors		40,104		
Labour hold		Swing	+3.92	
