= James Dempsey (Scottish politician) =

Scottish politician (1917-1982)

James Dempsey (6 February 1917 – 12 May 1982) was a Scottish Labour Party politician who was Member of Parliament for Coatbridge and Airdrie from 1959 until his death.

== Background ==
Dempsey was educated at Holy Family School, Mossend, the Co-operative College in Loughborough, and at the National Council of Labour Colleges. He was a clerk with a haulage firm and a councillor on Lanarkshire County Council from 1945. He later worked as a lecturer on political economy and a writer on local government.

== Parliament ==
In 1959, Dempsey was elected the Member of Parliament for Coatbridge and Airdrie. His maiden speech, on 28 October 1959, was on the subject of unemployment. His final appearance was asking a question about the Christmas payments for pensioners, on 18 January 1982. A devout Catholic, he opposed the Abortion Act 1967.

Amid a series of health problems, he announced that he would not contest the 1983 general election, but died from a heart attack before then, on 12 May 1982, at his home in Bellshill. In the resulting by-election, the Labour Party held his seat with Tom Clarke.

== Family ==
Dempsey's brother John Dempsey (Bellshill) was a footballer for Ipswich Town, Hamilton, Queen of the South, Newry Town and Cowdenbeath. John was also a football scout after his playing career, with Hamilton Academical, and more famously Glasgow Celtic for 11 years; from 1965 to 1976 he served under the late Jock Stein during the club's win in the 1967 European Cup Final.

Dempsey and his wife, Jane, had six children. His son Brian is a businessman and a former director of Celtic F.C.

Parliament of the United Kingdom
Preceded by Jean Mann	Member of Parliament for Coatbridge and Airdrie; 1959–1982	Succeeded by Tom Clarke
