= Tom Clarke (politician) =

British Labour Party politician (born 1941)

The Right Honourable Sir Tom Clarke CBE JP KSG
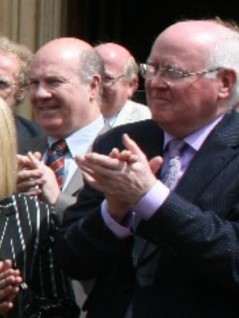
- Clarke (right) with Ian Davidson (left) in 2011

Minister of State for Film and Tourism
- In office 4 May 1997 – 29 July 1998
- Prime Minister: Tony Blair
- Preceded by: Nick Hawkins
- Succeeded by: Janet Anderson

Member of Parliament for Coatbridge, Chryston and Bellshill Coatbridge and Chryston (1997–2005) Monklands West (1983–1997) Coatbridge and Airdrie (1982–1983)
- In office 24 June 1982 – 30 March 2015
- Preceded by: James Dempsey
- Succeeded by: Phil Boswell

Shadow portfolios
- 1992–1993: Shadow Secretary of State for Scotland
- 1993–1994: Shadow Minister for Overseas Development
- 1995–1997: Shadow Minister for Disabled People

Personal details
- Born: 10 January 1941 (age 85) Coatbridge, Scotland
- Party: Labour
- Education: Scottish College of Commerce

Sir Thomas Clarke, CBE, PC, JP, KSG (born 10 January 1941) is a British Labour Party politician who was a Member of Parliament (MP) from 1982 until 2015, representing Coatbridge, Chryston and Bellshill from 2005 until losing his seat to Philip Boswell of the SNP in the May 2015 general election.

== Personal life ==
Clarke was born in Coatbridge and was educated at All Saints Primary School in Airdrie and St Columba High School in Coatbridge, followed by the Scottish College of Commerce in Glasgow. His brother, Tony, later become a councillor on North Lanarkshire Council.

Clarke has long been a strong supporter of British film making and was an assistant director of the Scottish Council for Education Technology and was also the President of the British Amateur Cinematographers Central Council in 1971. He then became a deputy director of the Scottish Film Council and was the organiser of the Scottish International Amateur Film Festival in 1971.

In 1973, Clarke submitted his short film, Give Us a Goal, to the amateur section of the Cannes Film Festival. He is a member of the GMB and British Film Institute, where he also served as a Governor, as well as being the chairman of The Citizens Trust.

== Career in local government ==
Clarke's political career began at the age of 18, when he was the election agent for the Labour MP James Dempsey. Aged 22, he then served as a councillor on the Coatbridge Town Council from 1964, and he became a Justice of the Peace for the Lanark area in 1972. The Coatbridge Town Council was replaced with the Monklands District Council in 1975, where Clarke continued to serve Coatbridge. He then served as the Monklands Provost (Mayor) for three consecutive terms from 1974 until 1982. He served as the vice president of the Convention of Scottish Local Authorities from 1976 until 1978, and as president of the convention from 1978 until 1980.

== Career in Parliament ==
Clarke was selected to contest the 1982 Coatbridge and Airdrie by-election caused by the death of the sitting Labour MP James Dempsey. He won the by-election on 24 June 1982 with a majority of 10,090. Clarke became known quite quickly in parliament for his work on issues surrounding disabled people and in 1986 he sponsored the 'Disabled Persons (Services, Representation and Consultation) Act'.

Following the 1987 general election, Neil Kinnock appointed him Shadow Minister for Personal Social Services from 1987, in which role he served until 1992. Clarke then became a member of the Shadow Cabinet of John Smith as Shadow Scottish Secretary. Clarke was diagnosed with chronic fatigue syndrome in 1992 but has since recovered. He then became the Shadow Minister for Overseas Development in 1993. Clarke left the Shadow Cabinet in 1994 and returned in 1995 to serve as Shadow Minister for the Disabled until 1997 under the leadership of Tony Blair.

Following the 1997 general election he joined the Privy Council and served as a Minister of State at the Department for Culture, Media and Sport with responsibility for Film and Tourism. He was reportedly dismissed from the role in a major government reshuffle whilst visiting the film set of Notting Hill.

Clarke was the Treasurer of the All-Party Parliamentary Group on Overseas Development and authored the International Development (Reporting and Transparency) Act 2006, which ensures that the Secretary of State for International Development reports on what the Department for International Development spends in total on international aid and is categorised into what proportion is spent upon low-income countries, the effectiveness of current spending and the level of transparency of international aid. The Act is also used as a guide to establish the current progress upon United Nations Millennium Development Goals.

He served as the Treasurer of the All Party Group on Carers from 2005 until 2010 and was the Chair of the All-Party Group on Learning Disabilities.

Clarke served on the Administration Committee from 2008 until 2010. In the following parliament he was a member of the Standards and Privileges Committee and the Joint Committee reviewing the draft bill on Reform of the House of Lords. In 2014, Clarke received £15,000 in damages for defamation in the Daily Mail which incorrectly claimed that he was involved in the decision to reduce the amount of expenses that MP Maria Miller should repay, allegedly motivated by his own expenses claims.

In February 2013, Clarke voted against the second reading of the Marriage (Same Sex Couples) Act 2013. Subsequently, in May 2013, the MP voted against the bill's third and final reading, opposing the legalisation of same-sex marriage within England and Wales.

== Honours ==
Clarke was appointed Commander of the Order of the British Empire (CBE) in the 1980 Birthday Honours for services to local government. He was sworn of the Privy Council of the United Kingdom on 20 May 1997.

In 2016, Clarke was awarded a Papal Knighthood and an audience with Pope Francis for his work on International Development and Disability Rights.

He was knighted in the 2021 New Year Honours for public and political service.

== Footnotes ==
Parliament of the United Kingdom
Preceded by James Dempsey	Member of Parliament for Coatbridge and Airdrie; 1982–1983	Constituency abolished
New constituency	Member of Parliament for Monklands West; 1983–1997	Constituency abolished
New constituency	Member of Parliament for Coatbridge and Chryston; 1997–2005	Constituency abolished
New constituency	Member of Parliament for Coatbridge, Chryston and Bellshill; 2005–2015	Succeeded by Phil Boswell
Political offices
Preceded by Donald Dewar	Shadow Secretary of State for Scotland; 1992–1993	Succeeded by George Robertson
Preceded by Michael Meacher	Shadow Minister for Overseas Development; 1993–1994	Succeeded by Joan Lestor
Vacant Title last held by Barry Sheerman	Shadow Minister for Disabled People; 1995–1997	Succeeded by Angela Browning
Preceded by Nick Hawkins	Minister of State for Film and Tourism; 1997–1998	Succeeded by Janet Anderson
