= Hugh Ferguson (politician) =

British politician (1863–1937)

Hugh Ferguson (1863 – 4 November 1937) was a Scottish Unionist Party politician.

After a career as a soldier, Ferguson became involved in the Orange Order, a Protestant Unionist organisation based in Ireland. Believing that there was a base for his politics in the west of Scotland, he stood for the Motherwell constituency in several Parliamentary elections.

In the 1918 general election, Ferguson won only 10.7% of the vote. However, in the 1922 election, although there was a National Liberal candidate there was no official Unionist candidate, and Ferguson stood as an "Independent Unionist" beating the National Liberal and coming a close second to the Communist victor with 29.1%. By the 1923 election, he was able to secure his adoption as the official Unionist candidate, and narrowly took the seat. He gained some notoriety by using an old anti-Catholic law to block a Corpus Christi procession in heavily Catholic Carfin in his constituency that became a trigger for the Catholic Relief Act of 1926. However, he only held the seat for a year, losing by an equally slim margin to James Barr, despite a swing against Labour in other parts of Scotland.

Ferguson then faded from public view. In 1933, he was convicted of receiving stolen goods, namely iron plates and railway chairs. He died on 4 November 1937.

== Sources ==
- Michael Stenton and Stephen Lees, Who's Who of British MPs: Volume III, 1919-1945
- Rosie, Michael John (2001). Religion and Sectarianism in Modern Scotland (Thesis).

Parliament of the United Kingdom
Preceded by Walton Newbold	Member of Parliament for Motherwell; 1923–1924	Succeeded by James Barr
