= Elizabeth Barr =

Scottish minister

- Born: 2 October 1905; Dennistoun, Scotland
- Died: 23 June 1995 (aged 89); Gartnavel General Hospital
- Education: University of Glasgow
- Occupation: Minister
- Known for: first woman to become a Presbyterian minister

Elizabeth Brown Barr (2 October 1905 – 23 June 1995) was a Scottish minister. She was the first woman to become a Presbyterian minister and the first female moderator of a general assembly of a Scottish church.

== Life ==
Barr was born in Dennistoun in Glasgow in 1905. Her parents were Elizabeth (née Brown) and James Barr. Her father was a minister who would lead the United Free Church of Scotland and become a member of parliament. During World War I her parents took in a refugee Belgian family. Barr became friends with the family and this friendship continued all her life. She attended Bellahouston Academy and then was a model student at the University of Glasgow where she was a keen member of the Student Christian Movement. She won academic prizes culminating in a first class masters degree in 1925.

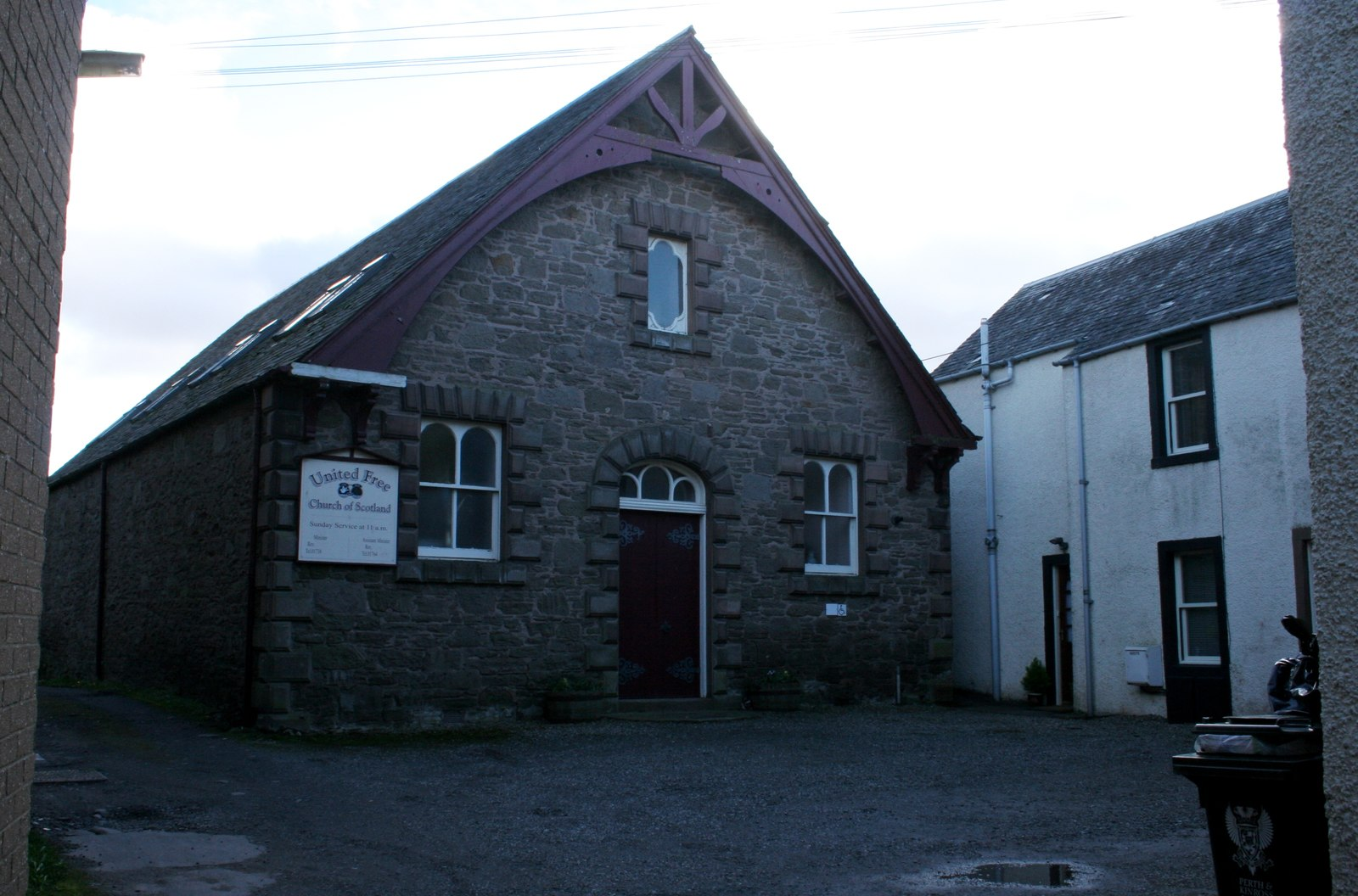
The United Free Church, Auchterarder had the first woman minister in Scotland

In c.1929-30, the first meeting of the new church that would become the United Free Church of Scotland passed an important resolution. At a time when women under 30 were not allowed to vote, the meeting agreed that "any member of the Church in full communion shall be eligible to hold any office within the Church"; the path was open for a woman to be a practicing minister. She was accepted as a candidate and she returned to Glasgow University to study the New Testament and to become a Bachelor of Divinity. She gained the church’s license to preach on 12 September 1933. In 1935, she was ordained and left to run the parish of Auchterarder in what is now Perth and Kinross. She was the first woman to become a minister after nearly 400 years of a men-only Presbyterian clergy. In 1943, she moved parish to Clydebank, and in 1955, she led the parish of Glasgow Central. In 1966, she went to her final parish of Miller Memorial Church in Maryhill. She retired from there in 1975.

She had become a leader in the church starting with the "Perth United Free Church Presbytery", where she was the moderator in 1939. In 1950, she was the moderator of the Glasgow presbytery, and ten years later she led her church's general assembly as its moderator on her church's 400th birthday. She was the first female moderator of a general assembly of a Scottish church.

Barr died in the Gartnavel General Hospital in Glasgow.
