= Thomas Ormiston =

Thomas Ormiston CBE (29 September 1878 – 15 January 1937) was a Scottish Unionist Party Member of Parliament (MP) who represented the Motherwell constituency from 1931 to 1935.

Parliament of the United Kingdom
Preceded by James Barr	Member of Parliament for Motherwell; 1931–1935	Succeeded by James Walker
