= Coatbridge and Airdrie =

Parliamentary constituency in the United Kingdom, 1950–1983

- Former burgh constituency for the House of Commons
- Subdivision: Lanarkshire
- Major settlements: Coatbridge, Airdrie

1950–1983
- Seats: One
- Created from: Coatbridge
- Replaced by: Monklands East and Monklands West

Coatbridge and Airdrie was a constituency represented in the House of Commons of the Parliament of the United Kingdom. It returned one Member of Parliament (MP) from 1950 until 1983.

It was then replaced by the Monklands West constituency.

== Boundaries ==
The constituency location was in northern Lanarkshire, to the north of Bothwell and to the east of Glasgow. From 1885 until 1983 Coatbridge and Airdrie were linked for parliamentary purposes. The seat was named Coatbridge and Airdrie after 1950.

In the 1885 to 1918 period the area formed the county constituency of Coatbridge. In the 1918 redistribution the burgh constituency of Coatbridge was created. The seat was defined in 1918 as comprising the burghs of Airdrie and Coatbridge.

The change in the constituency name in 1950 did not affect the boundaries. Apart from a small boundary change to Airdrie, which took effect for parliamentary purposes in 1955, its boundaries did not alter until the areas parliamentary representation was remodelled in 1983.

From the 1983 general election the area was divided between two new seats. It provided the majority of the electorate for both Monklands East and Monklands West. 34,802 electors in the old seat were included in the new East constituency (57.1% of the old seat and 72.2% of the new one). 26,148 voters found themselves in Monklands West (42.9% of the old seat and 53.4% of the new one).

== Members of Parliament ==
Election	Member	Party
1950	Jean Mann	Labour
1959	James Dempsey	Labour
1982 by-election	Tom Clarke	Labour
1983	constituency abolished	

== Election results ==
=== Elections in the 1950s ===
General election 1950: Coatbridge and Airdrie
Party	Candidate	Votes	%	±%
Labour	Jean Mann	23,239	56.53	
Unionist	James McMillan	16,552	40.27	
Anti-Partition	TP O'Callaghan	1,315	3.20	
Majority		6,687	16.26	
Turnout		47,841	85.92	
Labour win (new seat)				

General election 1951: Coatbridge and Airdrie
Party	Candidate	Votes	%	±%
Labour	Jean Mann	24,159	57.37	+0.84
Unionist	James McMillan	17,952	42.63	+2.36
Majority		6,207	14.74	−1.53
Turnout		42,111		
Labour hold		Swing		

General election 1955: Coatbridge and Airdrie
Party	Candidate	Votes	%	±%
Labour	Jean Mann	22,269	55.85	−1.52
Unionist	David Anderson	17,605	44.15	+1.52
Majority		4,664	11.70	−3.04
Turnout		39,874		
Labour hold		Swing		

General election 1959: Coatbridge and Airdrie
Party	Candidate	Votes	%	±%
Labour	James Dempsey	22,747	50.89	−4.96
Unionist	Catherine S Morton	21,953	49.11	+4.96
Majority		794	1.78	−9.92
Turnout		44,700		
Labour hold		Swing		

=== Elections in the 1960s ===
General election 1964: Coatbridge and Airdrie
Party	Candidate	Votes	%	±%
Labour	James Dempsey	27,178	62.11	+11.22
Unionist	Andrew Thomson	16,580	37.89	−11.22
Majority		10,598	24.22	+22.44
Turnout		43,758		
Labour hold		Swing		

General election 1966: Coatbridge and Airdrie
Party	Candidate	Votes	%	±%
Labour	James Dempsey	26,491	64.19	+2.08
Conservative	William C Raeburn	14,777	35.81	−2.08
Majority		11,714	28.38	+4.16
Turnout		41,268		
Labour hold		Swing		

=== Elections in the 1970s ===
General election 1970: Coatbridge and Airdrie
Party	Candidate	Votes	%	±%
Labour	James Dempsey	26,117	58.88	−5.31
Conservative	William Rennie	15,574	35.11	−0.70
SNP	Wolseley Brown	2,667	6.01	New
Majority		10,543	23.77	−4.62
Turnout		44,358		
Labour hold		Swing		

General election February 1974: Coatbridge and Airdrie
Party	Candidate	Votes	%	±%
Labour	James Dempsey	24,945	54.15	−4.73
Conservative	C Anderson	13,162	28.57	−6.54
SNP	D R M Hill	7,961	17.28	+11.27
Majority		11,783	25.58	+1.81
Turnout		46,068		
Labour hold		Swing		

General election October 1974: Coatbridge and Airdrie
Party	Candidate	Votes	%	±%
Labour	James Dempsey	23,034	51.61	−2.54
SNP	D R M Hill	12,466	27.93	+10.65
Conservative	John Love	7,683	17.22	−11.35
Liberal	A Smith	1,446	3.24	New
Majority		10,568	23.68	−1.90
Turnout		44,629		
Labour hold		Swing		

General election 1979: Coatbridge and Airdrie
Party	Candidate	Votes	%	±%
Labour	James Dempsey	27,598	60.9	+9.3
Conservative	John Love	12,442	27.5	+10.3
SNP	M. Johnston	5,260	11.6	−16.3
Majority		15,156	33.4	+9.7
Turnout		45,300	75.3	
Registered electors		60,133		
Labour hold		Swing		

=== Elections in the 1980s ===
- Death of James Dempsey

1982 Coatbridge and Airdrie by-election
Party	Candidate	Votes	%	±%
Labour	Tom Clarke	19,208	55.1	−5.8
Conservative	Hugo de Burgh	9,118	26.2	−1.3
SNP	Ron Wyllie	3,652	10.5	−1.1
Liberal	Sandy Henderson	2,873	8.2	New
Majority		10,090	28.9	−4.5
Turnout		34,951	56.3	−19.0
Registered electors		61,876		
Labour hold		Swing		

== See also ==
- 1982 Coatbridge and Airdrie by-election
