= George Lawson (Motherwell MP) =

George McArthur Lawson (11 July 1906 – 3 July 1978) was a Labour Party politician in the United Kingdom. He was the Member of Parliament for Motherwell from a by-election in 1954 until February 1974, and then for Motherwell and Wishaw until his retirement at the October 1974 general election.

== Career ==
Lawson was educated at elementary schools in North Merchiston, Edinburgh. He had been active in the labour movement for 20 years prior to becoming an MP. He was a tutor for the National Council of Labour Colleges from 1937 until 1950, which included a period of time serving as the council's West of Scotland organiser. He became the secretary of Edinburgh Trades Council (subsequently Edinburgh and District Trades Council) in 1950 and also served on the Scottish Advisory Committee of the Labour Party.

Following his election as an MP, Lawson was made an opposition whip and then, after Labour's return to power in 1964, a government whip. From 1966 to 1967 he was Deputy Chief Government Whip, serving under John Silkin. Ironically, Lawson was most noted for being one of 69 rebel Labour MPs who disobeyed a three-line whip to vote with the then Conservative Government in securing Britain's accession into the European Economic Community (EEC) in October 1971. Unlike most other pro-EEC Labour 'moderates', however, he was an opponent of Scottish devolution, and following his retirement from the House of Commons he was made campaign director of the anti-Home Rule group "Scotland is British", remaining so until his death.

Parliament of the United Kingdom
Preceded by Alexander Anderson	Member of Parliament for Motherwell; 1954–Feb. 1974	Constituency abolished
New constituency	Member of Parliament for Motherwell and Wishaw; Feb. 1974–Oct. 1974	Succeeded by Jeremy Bray
