= Richard Morris (British politician) =

British politician

Richard Morris (1869 – 26 September 1956) was a British Liberal Party politician.

He was elected at the 1918 general election as Member of Parliament (MP) for Member of Parliament for the new Northern division of Battersea. Standing as a Coalition Liberal without a Conservative opponent, he won 66.6% of the votes. He did not contest the 1922 general election, when in a 3-way contest the seat was won by Shapurji Saklatvala, a Communist Party member standing with the endorsement of the Labour Party.

Parliament of the United Kingdom
New constituency	Member of Parliament for Battersea North; 1918 – 1922	Succeeded by Shapurji Saklatvala
