= Motherwell (UK Parliament constituency) =

Parliamentary constituency in the United Kingdom, 1918–1974

- Former burgh constituency for the House of Commons
- Major settlements: Motherwell, Wishaw

1918–1974
- Seats: One
- Created from: North East Lanarkshire
- Replaced by: Motherwell and Wishaw

Motherwell was a burgh constituency represented in the House of Commons of the Parliament of the United Kingdom from 1918 to 1974. It was formed by the division of Lanarkshire. The name was changed in 1974 to Motherwell and Wishaw. It is famous for returning the first-ever SNP MP (Robert McIntyre in 1945) and arguably the first Communist Party MP (Walton Newbold in 1922).

== Boundaries ==
From 1918 the constituency consisted of "The burghs of Motherwell and Wishaw, together with the part of the Middle Ward County District which is contained within the extraburghal portion of the parish of Dalziel."

== Members of Parliament ==
Election	Member	Party
1918	Robert Nelson	Unionist
1922	Walton Newbold	Communist
1923	Hugh Ferguson	Unionist
1924	James Barr	Labour
1931	Thomas Ormiston	Unionist
1935	James Walker	Labour
1945 by-election	Robert McIntyre	SNP
1945	Alexander Anderson	Labour
1954 by-election	George Lawson	Labour
1974, Feb.	constituency renamed: see Motherwell and Wishaw	

== Election results ==
=== Elections in the 1970s ===
General election 1970: Motherwell
Party	Candidate	Votes	%	±%
Labour	George Lawson	20,683	53.2	−7.6
Conservative	S. Bell	12,509	32.2	−3.0
SNP	Isobel Lindsay	3,861	9.9	New
Communist	James Sneddon	1,829	4.7	+0.6
Majority		8,174	21.0	−4.6
Turnout		38,882	73.5	−0.9
Labour hold		Swing		

=== Elections in the 1960s ===
General election 1966: Motherwell
Party	Candidate	Votes	%	±%
Labour	George Lawson	22,658	60.8	+2.1
Conservative	John Joseph Young	13,100	35.2	−2.1
Communist	James Sneddon	1,508	4.1	+0.1
Majority		9,558	25.6	+4.2
Turnout		37,266	74.4	−4.5
Labour hold		Swing		

General election 1964: Motherwell
Party	Candidate	Votes	%	±%
Labour	George Lawson	23,281	58.7	+5.0
Unionist	John Joseph Young	14,789	37.3	−5.7
Communist	James Sneddon	1,565	4.0	New
Majority		8,492	21.4	+10.7
Turnout		39,635	78.9	−2.2
Labour hold		Swing		

=== Elections in the 1950s ===
General election 1959: Motherwell
Party	Candidate	Votes	%	±%
Labour	George Lawson	22,009	53.7	−0.2
Unionist	Bernard Brogan	17,613	43.0	−3.1
Independent	David Murray	1,331	3.3	New
Majority		4,396	10.7	+2.9
Turnout		40,953	81.1	+4.6
Labour hold		Swing		

General election 1955: Motherwell
Party	Candidate	Votes	%	±%
Labour	George Lawson	20,147	53.9	−3.4
Unionist	Michael Hutchison	17,262	46.1	+3.3
Majority		2,885	7.8	−6.7
Turnout		37,409	76.5	−8.2
Labour hold		Swing		

1954 Motherwell by-election
Party	Candidate	Votes	%	±%
Labour	George Lawson	19,163	56.4	−0.9
National Liberal	Norman A Sloan	13,334	39.3	−3.5
Communist	John Gollan	1,457	4.3	New
Majority		5,829	17.1	+2.6
Turnout		33,954		
Labour hold		Swing		

General election 1951: Motherwell
Party	Candidate	Votes	%	±%
Labour	Alexander Anderson	23,641	57.3	+3.1
National Liberal	Norman A Sloan	17,650	42.8	+8.8
Majority		5,991	14.5	−2.7
Turnout		41,291	84.7	+0.2
Labour hold		Swing		

General election 1950: Motherwell
Party	Candidate	Votes	%	±%
Labour	Alexander Anderson	22,608	54.2	+1.5
National Liberal	A. Robertson	14,183	34.0	+13.4
SNP	Robert McIntyre	3,892	9.3	−17.4
Communist	R. Henderson	1,007	2.4	New
Majority		8,425	20.2	−5.8
Turnout		41,690	84.5	+11.7
Labour hold		Swing		

=== Elections in the 1940s ===
General election 1945: Motherwell
Party	Candidate	Votes	%	±%
Labour	Alexander Anderson	15,831	52.7	+2.0
SNP	Robert McIntyre	8,022	26.7	N/A
Unionist	J. H. Hamilton	6,197	20.6	−28.7
Majority		7,809	26.0	+24.6
Turnout		30,050	72.8	−3.1
Labour hold		Swing		

1945 Motherwell by-election
Party	Candidate	Votes	%	±%
SNP	Robert McIntyre	11,417	51.4	New
Labour	Alexander Anderson	10,800	48.6	−1.9
Majority		617	2.8	N/A
Turnout		22,217	54.0	−21.9
SNP gain from Labour		Swing		

=== Elections in the 1930s ===
General election 1935: Motherwell
Party	Candidate	Votes	%	±%
Labour	James Walker	14,755	50.7	+2.0
Unionist	Thomas Ormiston	14,325	49.3	−2.0
Majority		430	1.4	N/A
Turnout		29,080	75.9	−6.5
Labour gain from Unionist		Swing		

General election 1931: Motherwell
Party	Candidate	Votes	%	±%
Unionist	Thomas Ormiston	15,513	51.3	+25.2
Labour	James Barr	14,714	48.7	−9.3
Majority		799	2.6	N/A
Turnout		30,227	82.4	+2.8
Unionist gain from Labour		Swing		

=== Elections in the 1920s ===
General election 1929: Motherwell
Party	Candidate	Votes	%	±%
Labour	James Barr	16,650	58.0	+5.9
Unionist	John Ford	7,502	26.1	−21.8
Liberal	Henry Archibald	3,597	12.5	New
Communist	Isabel Brown	984	3.4	New
Majority		9,148	31.9	+27.7
Turnout		28,733	79.6	−2.7
Registered electors		36,094		
Labour hold		Swing	+13.9	

General election 1924: Motherwell
Party	Candidate	Votes	%	±%
Labour	James Barr	12,816	52.1	New
Unionist	Hugh Ferguson	11,776	47.9	+5.9
Majority		1,040	4.2	N/A
Turnout		24,592	82.3	+4.9
Registered electors		29,871		
Labour gain from Unionist		Swing		

General election 1923: Motherwell
Party	Candidate	Votes	%	±%
Unionist	Hugh Ferguson	9,793	42.0	+12.9
Communist	Walton Newbold	8,712	37.4	+4.1
Liberal	John Maxwell	4,799	20.6	−1.0
Majority		1,081	4.6	N/A
Turnout		23,304	77.4	−4.1
Registered electors		30,109		
Unionist gain from Communist		Swing		

General election 1922: Motherwell
Party	Candidate	Votes	%	±%
Communist	Walton Newbold	8,262	33.3	+10.1
Ind. Unionist	Hugh Ferguson*	7,214	29.1	+18.3
Liberal	John Maxwell	5,359	21.6	−5.4
National Liberal	John Colville	3,966	16.0	N/A
Majority		1,048	10.2	N/A
Turnout		24,801	81.5	+17.3
Registered electors		30,443		
Communist gain from Unionist		Swing		

* Ferguson was associated with the Grand Orange Lodge of Scotland movement in Lanarkshire.

=== Elections in the 1910s ===
General election 1918: Motherwell
Party		Candidate	Votes	%	±%
C	Unionist	Robert Nelson	6,972	39.0	
	Liberal	James Duncan Millar	4,817	27.0	
	Labour	Walton Newbold	4,135	23.2	
	Ind. Unionist	Hugh Ferguson*	1,923	10.8	
Majority			2,155	12.0	
Turnout			17,847	64.2	
Registered electors			27,816		
	Unionist win (new seat)				
C indicates candidate endorsed by the coalition government.

* Ferguson was associated with the Grand Orange Lodge of Scotland movement in Lanarkshire.
