= United Free Church of Scotland =

Scottish Presbyterian denomination

- Classification: Protestant
- Orientation: Calvinist
- Polity: Presbyterian
- Region: Scotland
- Origin: 1900
- Merger of: The United Presbyterian Church of Scotland and most of the Free Church of Scotland
- Defunct: majority incorporated into the Church of Scotland in 1929
- Congregations: 47
- Members: 1782 (Communicant)
- Ministers: 22
- Official website: ufcos.org.uk

The United Free Church of Scotland (UF Church; Scottish Gaelic: An Eaglais Shaor Aonaichte, Scots: The Unitit Free Kirk o Scotland) is a Scottish Presbyterian denomination formed in 1900 by the union of the United Presbyterian Church of Scotland (or UP) and the majority of the 19th-century Free Church of Scotland. The majority of the United Free Church of Scotland united with the Church of Scotland in 1929.

== Origins ==
Timeline showing the evolution of the churches of Scotland from 1560

The Free Church of Scotland seceded from the Church of Scotland in the Disruption of 1843. The United Presbyterian Church was formed in 1847 by a union of the United Secession and Relief Churches, both of which had split from the Church of Scotland. The two denominations united in 1900 to form the United Free Church (except for a small section of the Free Church who rejected the union and continued independently under the name of the Free Church).

== Legal dispute: The Free Church Case ==
The minority of the Free Church, which had refused to join the union, quickly tested its legality. They issued a summons, claiming that in altering the principles of the Free Church, the majority had ceased to be the Free Church of Scotland and therefore forfeited the right to its assets – which should belong to the remaining minority, who were the true 'Free Church'. However, the case was lost in the Court of Session, where Lord Low (upheld by the second division) held that the Assembly of original Free Church had a right, within limits, to change its position.

An appeal to the House of Lords, (not delivered until 1 August 1904 due to a judicial death), reversed the Court of Session's decision (by a majority of 5–2), and found the minority entitled to the assets of the Free Church. It was held that, by adopting new standards of doctrine (and particularly by abandoning its commitment to 'the establishment principle' – which was held to be fundamental to the Free Church), the majority had violated the conditions on which the property of the Free Church was held.

The judgement had huge implications; seemingly it deprived the Free Church element of the UF Church of all assets—churches, manses, colleges, missions, and even provision for elderly clergy. It handed large amounts of property to the remnant; more than it could make effective use of. A conference, held in September 1904, between representatives of the UF and the (now distinct) Free Church, to come to some working arrangement, found that no basis for agreement could be found. A convocation of the UF Church, held on 15 December, decided that the union should proceed, and resolved to pursue every lawful means to restore their assets. As a result, the intervention of Parliament was sought.

A parliamentary commission was appointed, consisting of Lords Elgin, Kinnear and Anstruther. The question of interim possession was referred to Sir John Cheyne. The commission sat in public, and after hearing both sides, issued their report in April 1905. They stated that the feelings of both parties towards the other had made their work difficult. They concluded, however, that the Free Church was in many respects unable to carry out the purposes of the trusts, which, under the ruling of the House of Lords, was a condition of their holding the property. They recommended that an executive commission should be set up by act of parliament, in which the whole property of the Free Church, as at the date of the union, should be vested, and which should allocate it to the United Free Church, where the Free Church was unable to carry out the trust purposes.

The Churches (Scotland) Act 1905, which gave effect to these recommendations, was passed in August. The commissioners appointed were those on whose report the act was formed, plus two others. The allocation of churches and manses was a slow business, but by 1908 over 100 churches had been assigned to the Free Church. Some of the dispossessed UF Church congregations, most of them in the Highlands, found shelter for a time in the parish churches; but it was early decided that in spite of the objection against the erection of more church buildings in districts where many were now standing empty, 60 new churches and manses should at once be built at a cost of about £150,000. In October 1906 the commission intimated that the Assembly Hall, and the New College Buildings, were to belong to the UF Church, while the Free Church received the offices in Edinburgh, and a tenement to be converted into a college, while the library was to be vested in the UF Church, but open to members of both. After having held its Assembly in university class-rooms for two years, and in another hall in 1905, in 1906 the UF Church again occupied the historic buildings of the Free Church. All the foreign missions and all the continental stations were also adjudged to the United Free Church. (Incidentally, the same act also contained provided for the relaxation of subscription in the Church of Scotland, thus Parliament had involved itself in the affairs of all Presbyterian churches.)

== Existence 1900–1929 ==
The United Free Church was during its relatively short existence the second largest Presbyterian church in Scotland. The Free Church brought into the union 1,068 congregations, the United Presbyterians 593. Combined they had a membership of some half a million Scots. The revenue of the former amounted to £706,546, of the latter to £361,743. The missionaries of both churches joined the union, and the united Church was then equipped with missions in various parts of India, in Manchuria, in Africa (Lovedale, Livingstonia, etc.), in Palestine, in Melanesia and in the West Indies.

The UFC was broadly liberal Evangelical in its approach to theology and practical issues. It combined an acceptance of the findings of contemporary science, and the more moderate results of higher criticism with commitment to evangelism and missions. The UFC's approach to doctrinal conformity was fairly liberal for a Presbyterian denomination at the time. In its 1906 Act Anent Spiritual Independence of the Church, its General Assembly asserted the power to modify or define its Subordinate standard (the Westminster Confession) and its laws. Although its subordinate standard remained, ministers and elders were asked to state their belief in "the doctrine of this Church, set forth in the Confession of Faith". Thus the Church's interpretation of doctrine was prioritised over the confession.

The UFC had three divinity halls, at Glasgow, Edinburgh and Aberdeen, served by 17 professors and five lecturers. The first moderator was Robert Rainy. Its theologians and scholars have included H.R. Mackintosh, James Moffatt as well as John and Donald Baillie. British Prime Minister Bonar Law was raised in a Canadian Free Church manse and was a member of the United Free Church in Helensburgh.

== Churches 1900-1929 ==
=== Synod of Lothian ===
==== Presbytery of Edinburgh ====
Founded	Pre-1900	Post-1900	Pre-1929	Post-1929 name	Ended
1738 (S)	Ed. Nicolson Street UPC	Ed. Nicolson Street		Ed. Nicolson Street	1969
1753 (Burg)	Ed. Bristo UPC	Ed. Bristo		Ed. Bristo	1938
1765 (R)	Ed. College Street UPC	Ed. College Street	Ed. Union (united 1910)	Ed. College	1995
1859	Ed. Cowgate FC	Ed. Cowgate	Ed. Union (united 1910)	Ed. College	1995
1859	Ed. Pleasance FC	Ed. Pleasance	Ed. Union (united 1910)	Ed. College	1995
1775 (Burg)	East Calder UPC	East Calder		East Calder	1943
1776 (Burg)	Queensferry UPC	South Queensferry		South Queensferry St Andrew's	1956
1783 (Burg)	Slateford UPC	Ed. Slateford		Ed. Slateford	
1785 (Burg)	Ed. Broughton Place UPC	Ed. Broughton Place		Ed. Broughton Place	1974
1787 (AB)	Leith St Andrew's Pl. UPC	Leith St Andrew's Place		Ed. Leith St Andrew's Place	1973
1787 (Burg)	Leith Kirkgate UPC	Leith Kirkgate		Ed. Leith Kirkgate	1973
1791 (Burg)	Ed. Lauriston Place UPC	Ed. Lauriston Place		Ed. Lauriston	1958
1792 (AB)	Ed. Hope Park UPC	Ed. Hope Park		Ed. Hope Park	1940
1792/1843 (CE/F)	Ed. Craigmillar Park FC	Ed. Craigmillar Park		Ed. Craigmillar Park	2025
1794 (Burg)	West Calder UPC	West Calder Harwood		West Calder Harwood	-
1796 (R)	Ed. St James's Place UPC	Ed. St James's Place		Ed. St James's Place	1933
1803/09 (R/CAB)	Ed. McCrie-Roxburgh FC	Ed. McCrie-Roxburgh	Ed. Newington (united 1920)	Ed. Newington East	1942
1843	Ed. Newington FC	Ed. Newington	Ed. Newington (united 1920)	Ed. Newington East	1942
1817 (Burg)	Leith North UPC	Leith North Coburg Street		Ed. Leith Harper Memorial	1940
1818 (RP)	Ed. Martyrs' FC	Ed. Martyrs'	Ed. Martyrs' & St John's (1909)	Ed. Martyrs' & St John's	1930
1843	Ed. St John's FC	Ed. St John's	Ed. Martyrs' & St John's (1909)	Ed. Martyrs' & St John's	1930
1818 (R)	Ed. Viewforth UPC	Ed. Bruntsfield		Ed. Bruntsfield	1967
1821 (USC)	Ed. Palmerston Place UPC	Ed. Palmerston Place		Ed. Palmerston Place	
1822 (R)	Leith Junction Road	Leith Junction Road		Ed. Leith Junction Road	1975
1824/25 (R/R)	Ed. Arthur Street UPC	Ed. Arthur Street	Ed. Pleasance (ren. 1919)	Ed. Pleasance	1953
1826 (USC)	Balerno UPC	Balerno		Balerno	-
1827 (USC)	Ed. Lothian Road UPC	Ed. Lothian Road		Ed. Lothian Road	1976
1828 (USC)	Ed. Mayfield UPC	Ed. Fountainhall Road		Ed. Fountainhall Road	1958
1829 (USC)	Ed. Eyre Place UPC	Ed. Davidson		Ed. Davidson	1945
1836 (USC)	Ed. P'bello Windsor Pl. UP	Ed. Portobello Windsor Place		Ed. Portobello Windsor Place	1973
1836 (CoE)	Ed. St Paul's FC	Ed. St Paul's		Ed. St Paul's	1942
1839 (CoE)	Leith St Ninian's FC	Leith St Ninian's		Ed. Leith St Ninian's	1940
1843	Corstorphine FC	Corstorphine		Corstorphine St Ninian's	-
1843	Cramond FC	Cramond	Davidson's Mains (ren. 1927)	Davidson's Mains	-
1843	Ed. Dean FC	Ed. Dean	Ed. St Cuthbert's (united 1911)	Ed. Belford	1970
1843	Ed. St Cuthbert's FC	Ed. St Cuthbert's	Ed. St Cuthbert's (united 1911)	Ed. Belford	1970
1843	Ed. High FC	Ed. High		Ed. Reid Memorial	2026
1843	Ed. Knox's FC	Ed. Knox's	Ed. Moray-Knox (united 1910)	Ed. Moray-Knox	1930
1862	Ed. Moray FC	Ed. Moray	Ed. Moray-Knox (united 1910)	Ed. Moray-Knox	1930
1871	Ed. Canongate UPC	Ed. Canongate	Ed. Moray-Knox (united 1910)	Ed. Moray-Knox	1930
1843	Ed. Lady Glenorchy's FC	Ed. Lady Glenorchy's		Ed. Lady Glenorchy's North	1956
1843	Leith North FC	Leith North Ferry Road		Ed. Leith St Nicholas'	1962
1843	Leith St John's FC	Leith St John's	Leith St John's (united 1907)	Ed. Leith St John's West	1954
1863	Leith Elder Memorial FC	Leith Elder Memorial	Leith St John's (united 1907)	Ed. Leith St John's West	1954
1843	Leith South FC	Leith South		Ed. Leith Claremont	1973
1843	Ed. Liberton FC	Ed. Liberton		Ed. Liberton Northfield	
1843	Ed. Morningside FC	Ed. Morningside		Ed. Morningside High	1960
1843	Ed. Newhaven FC	Ed. Newhaven		Ed. Newhaven St Andrew's	1974
1843	Ed. New North FC	Ed. New North		Ed. New North	1941
1843	Ed. Pilrig FC	Ed. Pilrig		Ed. Pilrig	1950
1843	Ed. Portobello FC	Ed. Portobello St Philip's		Ed. Portobello St Philip's	
1843/43 (F/F)	Ed. Queen Street FC	Ed. Queen Street		Ed. Queen Street	1947
1843	Ed. St Andrew's FC	Ed. St Andrew's		Ed. St Andrew's Drumsheugh	1955
1843	Ed. St Bernard's FC	Ed. St Bernard's	Ed. St Bernard's (united 1915)	Ed. St Bernard's South	1945
1861	Ed. Dean Street UPC	Ed. Dean Street	Ed. St Bernard's (united 1915)	Ed. St Bernard's South	1945
1843	Ed. St Columba's FC	Ed. St Columba's		Ed. St Columba's	1948
1843	Ed. St David's FC	Ed. St David's		Ed. St David's Morrison St.	
1843	Ed. St George's FC	Ed. St George's		Ed. St George's West	2010
1843	Ed. St Mary's FC	Ed. St Mary's		Ed. Barony	1933
1843	Ed. St Stephen's FC	Ed. St Stephen's		Ed. St Stephen's Comely Bank	
1844	Ratho & Kirknewton FC	Ratho & Kirknewton		Wilkieston	1969
1845/61 (I/UP)	Ed. N. Richmond St. UPC	Ed. North Richmond Street		Ed. Richmond Craigmillar	-
1847	Ed. West Port FC	Ed. Chalmers		Ed. Chalmers	1958
1848	Ed. Grange Road UPC	Ed. Newington South		Ed. Newington South	1940
1849	Ed. Holyrood FC	Ed. Holyrood	Ed. Holyrood Abbey (un. 1910)	Ed. Holyrood Abbey	
1860	Ed. Abbeyhill UPC	Ed. Abbeyhill	Ed. Holyrood Abbey (un. 1910)	Ed. Holyrood Abbey	
1853	Ed. Fountainbridge FC	Ed. Candlish		Ed. Candlish	1981
~1860 (Ev.U.)	Ed. Fountainbridge UPC	Ed. East Fountainbridge	dissolved 1905		
1860	Ed. Gilmore Place UPC	Ed. Gilmore Place	dissolved 1921		
1863	Ed. Morningside UPC	Ed. North Morningside		Ed. North Morningside	1980
1865	Ed. Barclay FC	Ed. Barclay		Ed. Barclay	1967
1865	Ed. Grange FC	Ed. Grange		Ed. St Catherine's in Grange	1968
1866	Ed. Roseburn FC	Ed. Roseburn		Ed. Roseburn	1962
1868	Ed. Stockbridge FC	Ed. Stockbridge		Ed. Stockbridge	1975
1868	West Calder FC	West Calder Limefield		joined UFC Continuing	
1872	Ed. Haymarket UPC	Ed. Haymarket		Ed. Haymarket	1960
1872	Ed. London Road UPC	Ed. London Road		Ed. London Road	
1872	Ed. Viewforth FC	Ed. Viewforth		Ed. Viewforth	1957
1875	Ed. Rose Street UPC	Ed. Rose Street	Ed. McDonald Road (rn. 1903)	Ed. McDonald Road	1974
1876	Leith Bonnington UPC	Leith Bonnington		Ed. Leith Bonnington	1968
1876	Ed. Mayfield FC	Ed. Mayfield		Ed. Mayfield North	1958
1876	Ed. St James's FC	Ed. St James's		Ed. Inverleith	
1877	Ed. Argyle Place UPC	Ed. Argyle Place		Ed. Argyle Place	1968
1877	Ed. Dalry FC	Ed. Dalry		Ed. Dalry	1960
1878	Ed. Rosehall UPC	Ed. Rosehall		Ed. Rosehall	1974
1878	Ed. P'bello Regent St. UPC	Ed. Portobello Regent Street		Ed. Portobello Regent Street	1952
1879	Leith Dalmeny Street UPC	Leith Dalmeny Street		Ed. Leith Dalmeny Street	1950
1880	Juniper Green FC	Juniper Green		Ed. Juniper Green St Andrew's	1974
1881	Ed. Guthrie Memorial FC	Ed. Guthrie Memorial		Ed. Guthrie Memorial	1962
1883	Ed. Braid UPC	Ed. Braid		Ed. Braid	1990
1883	Ed. Merchiston UPC	Ed. John Ker Memorial		Ed. John Ker Memorial	1981
1885	Leith Wardie UPC	Leith Wardie		Ed. Leith Wardie	-
1886	Ed. Warrender Park FC	Ed. Warrender Park		Ed. Warrender	1972
1889	Ed. South Morningside FC	Ed. South Morningside		Ed. South Morningside	1974
1890	Ed. Restalrig FC	Ed. Restalrig		Ed. New Restalrig	
1891	Ed. Gorgie FC	Ed. Gorgie		Ed. North Merchiston	1986
1891	Leith Ebenezer UPC	Leith Ebenezer		joined UFC Continuing	
1898	Ed. Gorgie UPC	Ed. Cairns Memorial		Ed. Cairns Memorial	1979
1900	Ed. Greenbank UPC	Ed. Greenbank		Ed. Greenbank	
1919			Addiewell & Stoneyburn	Stoneyburn	
1927			Ed. Fountainbridge	Ed. Fountainbridge	1974
1927			Ed. Lochend	Ed. Lochend	1992
1928			Ed. Stenhouse	Ed. Stenhouse Saughton	1993

==== Presbytery of Bathgate ====
Founded	Pre-1900	Post-1900	Pre-1929	Post-1929 name	Ended
1762 (AB)	Mid Calder UPC	Mid Calder		Mid Calder Bridgend	1956
1766 (AB)	Whitburn FC	Whitburn		Whitburn Brucefield	
1774 (Burg)	Whitburn/Longridge UPC	Longridge		Longridge and Breich	
1801 (OB)	Crofthead FC	Fauldhouse		Fauldhouse Crofthead	1973
1803 (Burg)	Avonbridge UPC	Avonbridge		Avonbridge	2024
1812 (R)	Bathgate (West) UPC	Bathgate St John's		Bathgate St John's	
1843	Bathgate FC	Bathgate St David's		Bathgate St David's	
1843	Kirkliston FC	Kirkliston		Newliston	1941
1843	Livingston FC	Livingston		Livingston Tulloch	1945
1843	Torphichen FC	Torphichen		Torphichen St John's	1931
1844	Broxburn FC	Broxburn West		Broxburn West	1975
1845	Slamannan FC	Slamannan		Slamannan Balquhatson	1945
1861	Armadale FC	Armadale		Armadale East	1973
1874	Harthill FC	Harthill		Harthill Forrest Memorial	1953
1879	Broxburn UPC	Broxburn East		Broxburn St John's	1964
1888	Longriggend FC	Longriggend		Longriggend	1932
1893	Caldercruix FC	Caldercruix		Caldercruix West	1939
1898	Blackridge FC	Blackridge		Blackridge	
1898	Uphall FC	Uphall		Uphall South	
1910			Blackburn (miss. 1906)	Blackburn	

==== Presbytery of Linlithgow and Falkirk ====
Founded	Pre-1900	Post-1900	Pre-1929	Post-1929 name	Ended
1738 (S)	Cumbernauld FC	Cumbernauld Bridgend	Cumbernauld (united 1920)	Cumbernauld St Andrew's	1952
1759 (AB)	Cumbernauld UPC	Cumbernauld Baird	Cumbernauld (united 1920)	Cumbernauld St Andrew's	1952
1738 (S)	Falkirk Erskine UPC	Falkirk Erskine		Falkirk Erskine	
1739 (S)	Linlithgow East UPC	Linlithgow East	Linl. Craigmailen (un. 1917)	Linlithgow Craigmailen	1954
1770 (Burg)	Linlithgow West UPC	Linlithgow Trinity	Linl. Craigmailen (un. 1917)	Linlithgow Craigmailen	1954
1746 (S)	Dennyloanhead UPC	Dennyloanhead		Dennyloanhead	1991
1762/1795 (AB/B)	Bo'ness UPC	Bo'ness Craigmailen		joined UFC Continuing	
1767 (R)	Falkirk West UPC	Falkirk West		Falkirk West	
1768 (R)	Kilsyth UPC	Kilsyth Anderson		Kilsyth Anderson	
1781 (AB)	Falkirk Graham's Road UPC	Falkirk Graham's Road		Falkirk Graham's Road	1975
1783 (RP)	Laurieston FC	Laurieston		Falkirk Laurieston West	1945
1793 (Burg)	Denny UPC	Denny Broompark		Denny Broompark	1963
1803 (OB)	Falkirk FC	Falkirk St Andrew's		Falkirk St Andrew's	
1808 (Burg)	Airth UPC	Airth		Airth South	1956
1837 (CoE)	Grangemouth Charing Cross FC	Grangemouth Charing Cross		Grangemouth Charing Cross	
1843 (Ind)	Falkirk St James's UPC	Falkirk St James's		Falkirk St James's	
1843	Abercorn FC	Abercorn		Abercorn South & Winchburgh	1946
1843	Kilsyth FC	Kilsyth High		Kilsyth Burns	1975
1843	Larbert FC	Larbert East		Larbert East	2025
1843	Linlithgow FC	Linlithgow High		Linlithgow St Ninian's	1954
1843	Polmont FC	Polmont		Polmont South	
1844	Bo'ness & Carriden FC	Bo'ness St Andrew's		Bo'ness St Andrew's	2025
	FC	Denny Dunipace		Denny Dunipace	1989
	FC	Denny West		Denny West	1963
1854	Grangemouth UPC	Grangemouth Grange		Grangemouth Grange	
1878	Carron UPC	Carron		Carron	1963
1878	Falkirk Bainsford FC	Falkirk Bainsford		Falkirk Bainsford	
1884	Grangemouth West FC	Grangemouth West		Grangemouth West	
1886	Wester Pardovan UPC	Wester Pardovan		Pardovan	1944
1890	Camelon FC	Falkirk Camelon	Falkirk Irving (ren. 1906)	Falkirk Irving	
1890	Shieldhill FC	Shieldhill		Shieldhill	1963
1893	Grangemouth Dundas UPC	Grangemouth Dundas		Grangemouth Dundas	
1898	Larbert UPC	Larbert West		Larbert West	2025
1904			Falkirk Trinity	Falkirk Camelon Trinity	1973
1914			Bonnybridge (miss. 1904)	High Bonnybridge St Helen's	

=== Synod of Dumfries and Galloway ===
- Presbytery of Annandale (19 to 16)
  - Unchanged: Annan Erskine, Annan St Andrew's, Eskdalemuir, Johnstone & Wamphray, Kirkpatrick Fleming, Lockerbie St Cuthbert's, Lockerbie Trinity, Moffat St Mary's, Moffat Well Road, Rigg of Gretna, Waterbeck
  - Foundations: Gretna St Andrew's (1921)
  - Unions: Chapelknowe + Half Morton & Gretna = Chapelknowe & Gretna 1904. Ecclefechan East + Ecclefechan West = Ecclefechan 1915. Hightae + Dalton (from Presbytery of Dumfries) = Hightae & Dalton 1904. Kirkmichael + Lochmaben Barras = Lochmaben Barras & Kirkmichael 1902. Lochmaben Barras & Kirkmichael + Lochmaben Victoria = Lochmaben & Kirkmichael 1920.
- Presbytery of Dumfries and Penpont (30 to 22)
  - Unchanged: Closeburn*, Dumfries Buccleuch Street, Dumfries Loreburn*, Dumfries St George's, Dumfries South, Dumfries Townhead, Dunscore Craig, Irongray, Kirkbean & Southwick, Kirkmahoe, Lochend & New Abbey, Maxwelltown, Ruthwell, Sanquhar North, Wanlockhead
  - Dissolutions: Dumfries Martyrs' (1924), Glencaple (1908)
  - Foundations: Kirkconnel (1914)
  - Unions: Burnhead + Penpont West = Scaurbridge & Burnhead 1911. Dalbeattie Burnside + Dalbeattie Colliston = Dalbeattie Park 1919. Dunscore East + Dunscore Renwick = Dunscore 1918. Glencairn + Moniaive = Glencairn & Moniaive 1911. Penpont (named Penpont East until 1911) + Thornhill = Thornhill & Virginhall 1924. Sanquhar South + Sanquhar West = Sanquhar 1916.

=== Synod of Glenelg ===
- Presbytery of Lewis: Back (1900-07), Barvas, Bernera (1928-29), Carloway, Cross, Kinloch, Knock, Lochs, Park (1900-07), Shawbost (1900-07), Stornoway English, Stornoway High, Stornoway James Street (1900-13), Uig
- Presbytery of Uist: Benbecula, Bernera, Carinish, Harris, North Uist, South Uist, Tarbert Harris

=== Synod of Lothian ===
- Presbytery of Dalkeith (25 to 21)
  - Unchanged: Carlops, Cockpen, Dalkeith Buccleuch Street, Fala, Ford, Howgate, Kirkurd, Lasswade, Musselburgh Bridge Street, Musselburgh High, Musselburgh Millhill, Newbattle, Ormiston, Penicuik North, Penicuik South, Roslin, Temple & Carrington
  - Unions: Dalkeith St John's + Dalkeith King's Park = Dalkeith St John's & King's Park 1912. Gorebridge East + Gorebridge St Paul's = Gorebridge 1921. Loanhead Erskine + Loanhead South = Loanhead 1904. Newlands + West Linton = West Linton & Newlands 1910.
- Presbytery of Haddington and Dunbar (23 to 19)
  - Unchanged: Aberlady, Cockenzie, Dirleton, Garvald, Haddington St John's, Haddington West, Humbie, Innerwick, North Berwick Abbey, North Berwick Blackadder, Pencaitland, Prestonpans, Tranent St Andrew's, Tranent Wishart, Yester
  - Plants: Gullane (1906)
  - Dissolutions: Haddington East (1903), Saltoun & Bolton (1916)
  - Unions: Cockburnspath + Stockbridge = Cockburnspath & Stockbridge 1901. Dunbar Abbey + Dunbar Erskine = Dunbar 1917. Prestonkirk East Linton North + Prestonkirk St Andrew's = Prestonkirk 1910.

=== Synod of Merse and Teviotdale (90 to 69) ===
- Presbytery of Duns and Chirnside (24 to 19)
  - Unchanged: Allanton, Ayton, Burnmouth, Coldingham, Duns Boston, Duns East, Duns South, Grantshouse, Langton, Longformacus, Mordington (renamed Mordington & Paxton 1908), Reston, St Abbs, Swinton, Westruther
  - Dissolutions: Berwick (transferred to English Presbyterian Church 1917), Horndean (1903), Spittal (1908)
  - Unions: Chirnside Erskine + Chirnside West = Chirnside 1919. Eyemouth East + Eyemouth St John's = Eyemouth 1917. Greenlaw East + Greenlaw West = Greenlaw 1903.
- Presbytery of Galashiels (26 to 19)
  - Unchanged: Earlston, Ettrick, Galashiels East, Galashiels Ladhope, Galashiels St John's, Galashiels South, Galashiels West, Melrose High Cross, Melrose St Aidan's, Peebles Leckie Memorial, St Boswells, Selkirk Lawson Memorial, Yarrow
  - Unions: Bowden + Newtown 1929. Innerleithen Law + Innerleithen St John's = Innerleithen 1919. Lauder East + Lauder West = Lauder 1908. Peebles St Andrew's + Peebles West = Peebles St Andrew's 1918. Selkirk Forest + Selkirk West = Selkirk West 1915. Stow North + Stow South = Stow 1901.
- Presbytery of Hawick (18 to 17)
  - Unchanged: Canonbie, Denholm, Hawick Allars, Hawick East Bank, Hawick Orrock Place, Hawick St Andrew's, Hawick St George's, Hawick West Port, Hawick Wilton, Holywell, Langholm Chalmers, Longtown St Andrew's, Newcastleton North, Newcastleton South, Wolflee
  - Unions: Langholm North + Langholm South = Langholm Erskine 1925. Lilliesleaf + Ashkirk (from Presbytery of Galashiels) = Lilliesleaf & Ashkirk 1909.
- Presbytery of Jedburgh and Kelso (22 to 14)
  - Unchanged: Ancrum, Coldstream Rodger Memorial, Coldstream West, Crailing, Gordon (transferred to Presbytery of Duns and Chirnside 1912), Jedburgh Abbey, Kelso Edenside, Kelso Trinity, Leitholm, Makerstoun, Stichill
  - Dissolutions: Coldstream East (1905), Eccles (1923), Nenthorn (1914)
  - Unions: Jedburgh Blackfriars + Jedburgh Boston = Jedburgh Boston Blackfriars 1917. Kelso East + Kelso North = Kelso St John's 1906. Morebattle Gateshaw Brae + Morebattle St Lawrence = Morebattle 1907. Yetholm Border View + Yetholm St James' = Yetholm 1914.

=== Synod of Moray and Ross ===
- Presbytery of Abernethy: Abernethy (1900-04), Abernethy & Boat of Garten (1904-29), Alvie, Cromdale & Advie, Duthil (later Duthil Carrbridge), Grantown, Kingussie, Kirkmichael, Laggan, Rothiemurchus & Aviemore (1902-29)
- Presbytery of Chanonry: Avoch, Cromarty, Fortrose, Killearnan, Knockbain, Knockbain West (1900-?), Resolis*
- Presbytery of Dingwall: Alness, Contin (1900-07), Dingwall, Ferintosh & Maryburgh (1908-), Kilmorack, Kiltearn (1900-07), Maryburgh (1900-08), Strathconan (1900-28), Strathgarve (1900-07), Strathpeffer & Fodderty, Urquhart (1900-08), Urray
- Presbytery of Elgin: Alves, Bellie, Burghead North (1900-06), Burghead South (1900-06), Burghead (1906-29), Elgin High, Elgin Moss Street, Elgin South, Garmouth, Hopeman, Knockando, Lossiemouth High, Lossiemouth St James', Pluscarden, Rothes, Urquhart
- Presbytery of Forres and Nairn: Ardclach, Auldearn, Cawdor, Dallas, Dyke, Edinkillie, Forres: Castlehill, Forres: Cumming St (later High), Kinloss, Moyness, Nairn: High, Nairn: Rosebank, Rafford
- Presbytery of Inverness: Ardersier: North (1900-07), Ardersier: South (1900-07), Ardersier (1907-29), Croy, Daviot (1900-07), Dores & Bona, Glenurquhart (1913-29), Inv: Crown, Inv: East, Inv: High, Inv: Ness Bank, Inv: Queen St, Inv: West, Kiltarlity, Kirkhill, Moy (1900-07), Petty, Stratherrick, Strathglass
- Presbytery of Tain: Croick (1900-07), Edderton, Fearn, Invergordon, Kilmuir Easter, Kincardine (1900-10), Kincardine & Croick (1910-29), Logie Easter, Nigg (1900-22), Nigg Chapelhill (1900-22), Nigg & Chapelhill (1922-29), Rosskeen, Tain, Tain: Cadboll Place (1900-03), Tarbat

Synod of Sutherland and Caithness

- Presbytery of Dornoch: Assynt (1900-21), Assynt Elphin & Stoer (1921-29), Clyne, Creich
- Presbytery of Abertarff: Glenurquhart (1900-13)

== Union with the Church of Scotland ==
As its early days were preoccupied with the aftermath of union, so its later days were with the coming union with the Church of Scotland. The problem was the CofS's position as an established church conflicted with the Voluntaryism of the UFC. Discussions began in 1909, but were complex. The Very Rev William Paterson Paterson, Moderator of the General Assembly of the Church of Scotland made much progress during his period in office 1919/20.

The main hurdles were overcome by two parliamentary statutes, firstly the Church of Scotland Act 1921, which recognised the Church of Scotland's independence in spiritual matters (a right asserted by its Articles Declaratory of 1919). The second was the Church of Scotland (Properties and Endowments) Act 1925 (15 & 16 Geo. 5. c. 33), which transferred the secular endowment of the church to a new body called the General Trustees. These measures satisfied the majority of the UFC that the Church-state entanglement of the Church of Scotland, which had been the cause of the Disruption of 1843 had at last ended. In 1929, the merger with the Church of Scotland largely reversed the Disruption of 1843 and reunited much of Scottish Presbyterianism. On 2 October 1929, at an assembly at the Industrial Hall on Annandale Street off Leith Walk in Edinburgh, the two churches merged. The Hall is now the central bus depot for Lothian Region Transport.

A relatively small minority stayed out of the union, and retained the name of U.F. Church.

== The continuing UFC, 1929–present ==
Voluntaryism led some to oppose the union (the United Free Church Association, led by James Barr – minister of Govan and Labour MP for Motherwell). When it came, 13,000 UFC members remained outside, calling themselves the United Free Church (Continuing). The phrase 'continuing' was used for five years to avoid confusion between the remaining United Free Church and the pre-union Church. It was dropped from the title in 1934. An agreement between the parties avoided the property disputes of the 1900 union. UFC members increased slightly during the 1930s, to a peak of 23,000 by 1939, but it never regained anywhere near the numbers it had had prior to the union with the Church of Scotland.

The ongoing UFC continues in the 'broad evangelical' tradition.

The continuing UFC agreed to permit the ordination of female ministers in 1929. The church elected a woman as its moderator in 1960, when Elizabeth Barr became the first female moderator of a general assembly of a Scottish church.

The General Assembly of the United Free Church of Scotland meets annually, beginning on the Wednesday after the first Sunday in June, and lasting until the Friday. Since 2008, they have committed to having the General Assembly in a central location, meeting in the Salutation Hotel, Perth.

At its 50th anniversary, in 1979, the denomination had 86 congregations across Scotland, with 12,386 members. These were served by 74 ministers (including 24 retired), and 926 elders.

In 2016, they had 60 ordained ministers, including retired and those serving part-time. There were three students, and a further three probationer ministers. The denomination has 388 Elders, and 255 Deacons, Managers or board members who are not Elders.

In 2023, there were 22 serving ministers, along with seven Ministry Assistants. There was one Student Minister, and 22 Retired Ministers. The denomination has 300 Elders, and 183 Deacons, Managers or board members who are not Elders. The total membership (Communicants) at the end of 2023 was 1782 individuals.

=== Ecumenical relations ===
The modern UFC is involved in the ecumenical movement in Scotland and is a member of Action of Churches Together in Scotland. Internationally, it is a member of the World Council of Churches,

=== Churches (present day) ===
In 2016, the UFC had 53 congregations in its three presbyteries. By end 2023, this had reduced to 47 congregations. These three presbyteries are 'The East', 'The West' and 'The North'.

- The East: meets in Bo'ness and covers central Scotland, South Fife and the Lothians. It has 14 congregations.
- The West which meets in Glasgow and covers Strathclyde, and has 21 congregations within its bounds.
- The North meets in Aberdeen and Perth covering Tayside, The Highlands, Grampian and the Northern Isles. It has 12 congregations.

Church	Location	Web	Founded	Notes
Canonbie United Parish Church	Canonbie, Dumfries and Galloway			Joint CoS / UFCS congregation
Ardeer UFC	Ardeer, North Ayrshire			Vacant
Largs UFC	Largs, North Ayrshire			Rev. Archie Ford
St Andrew's UFC, Cumnock	Cumnock, East Ayrshire			Rev. Graham Brown
Calder UFC, Lochwinnoch	Lochwinnoch, Renfrewshire		1791	Rev. Tony Paton
Candlish Wynd UFC, Govanhill	Govanhill, Glasgow			Rev. Elizabeth MacKay
Cathcart UFC	Cathcart, Glasgow		1929	Vacant
Croftfoot UFC	Croftfoot, Glasgow			Rev. Ann Deacons
Darnley UFC	Darnley, Glasgow		1977	Rev. David Steele
Drumchapel UFC	Drumchapel, Glasgow		1958	Rev. Phil Steed
Knightswood UFC	Knightswood, Glasgow			Rev Sam Parkinson
Millerston UFC	Millerston, Glasgow			Rev. David Miller
Shieldhall and Drumoyne UFC	Shieldhall, Glasgow			
Dalreoch UFC	Dalreoch, West Dunbartonshire			Rev Dr Sara Rettie
Milngavie UFC	Milngavie, East Dunbartonshire			Vacant
St Andrew's UFC, Bellshill	Bellshill, North Lanarkshire		1762	Rev. Jason Lingiah
Chryston UFC	Chryston, North Lanarkshire			Rev. Steve Marr
Wishaw UFC	Wishaw, North Lanarkshire			Rev. Colin Mackenzie
Park Church, Uddingston	Uddingston, South Lanarkshire		1863	Rev. Bruce McDowall
Broxburn UFC	Broxburn, West Lothian			
Craigmailen UFC, Bo'ness	Bo'ness, West Lothian			Rev. Andrew Brown
Limefield UFC, West Calder	West Calder, West Lothian			
Corstorphine Community Church	Corstorphine, Edinburgh		1929	Rev Duncan Whitty
Ebenezer UFC, Leith	Leith, Edinburgh			
Wilson Memorial Church, Edinburgh	Craigentinny, Edinburgh		1933	
Murrayfield UFC, Bannockburn	Bannockburn, Stirling			Rev. Gary Barclay
St Ninians UFC, Stirling	Stirling, Stirling		1773	Rev. Martin Keane
Menstrie UFC	Menstrie, Clackmannanshire			
Sauchie and Fishcross UFC	Sauchie, Clackmannanshire		1913	Rev. Tom McWhirter
Burntisland Erskine UFC	Burntisland, Fife			Rev. Alexander Ritchie
Cornerstone St Andrews UFC	St Andrews, Fife			Rev. Jared Michelson
Tayport UFC	Tayport, Fife			
Auchterarder St Andrew's UFC	Auchterarder, Perth and Kinross			Rev. Jerome O'Brien
Balbeggie UFC	Balbeggie, Perth and Kinross			
Trinity Church, Crook of Devon	Crook of Devon, Perth and Kinross			Rev. Jerome O'Brien
Erskine UFC, Carnoustie	Carnoustie, Angus			Rev. Douglas Campbell
Knox UFC, Montrose	Montrose, Angus			Rev. Douglas Campbell
Dundee UFC	Dundee, Dundee			Rev. Jane McArthur
Northfield UFC	Northfield, Aberdeen			Rev. Andy Ellison
Torry UFC	Torry, Aberdeen		1929	Rev. Ian Lloyd
Lossiemouth UFC	Lossiemouth, Moray		1930	Rev. Gordon Mackenzie
Balintore UFC	Balintore, Highland		1929	Rev. Scott Cameron
Cunningsburgh UFC	Cunningsburgh, Shetland			
Kilmaurs Maxwell UFC				Rev. John Fulton
Dounby UFC, Orkney				

=== Churches (post 1929) ===
The following UFC churches, or sections of churches, are recorded in the Fasti of the United Free Church (1900-29) as having remained outside the Union of 1929 with the Church of Scotland:

- Alloa: Moncrieff (a minority of members, who took the buildings) (Presbytery of Stirling and Dunblane)
- Auchterarder: West (some members) (Presbytery of Auchterarder)
- Boddam (Presbytery of Deer)
- Bo'ness: Craigmailen (Presbytery of Linlithgow and Falkirk)
- Broughton (Presbytery of Lanark)
- Burntisland: Erskine (Presbytery of Kirkcaldy)
- Campbeltown: Lochend (Presbytery of Kintyre)
- Closeburn (Presbytery of Dumfries and Penpont)
- Dumfries: Loreburn (Presbytery of Dumfries and Penpont)
- Dysart: Normand Road (Presbytery of Kirkcaldy)
- Greenock: St Andrew's Square (Presbytery of Gourock)
- Kilmaurs: Maxwell (Presbytery of Irvine and Kilmarnock)
- Leith: Ebenezer (Presbytery of Edinburgh)
- Lismore (Presbytery of Lorn)
- Lochwinnoch: Calder (Presbytery of Paisley)
- Newport: Trinity (Presbytery of St Andrews)
- Sanday: East ("a considerable body of members") (Presbytery of Orkney)
- Sauchie and Fishcross (Presbytery of Stirling and Dunblane)
- West Calder: Limefield (Presbytery of Edinburgh)
- Westray (a majority of members) (Presbytery of Orkney)

The following congregations were formed shortly after 1929:

- Lerwick

== Moderators of the General Assembly of the United Free Church ==
1900 - 1929

- Robert Rainy (1900)
- Thomas Kennedy (1901)
- Robert Howie (1902)
- George Robson (1903)
- Robert Gordon Balfour (1904)
- Robert Rainy (1905)
- George Clark Hutton (1906)
- Charles Greig McCrie (1907)
- Robert Laws (1908)
- John Young (1910)
- James Wells (1911)
- Thomas Whitelaw (1912)
- James Iverach (1913)
- George Reith (1914)
- Alexander Robertson MacEwen (1915)
- George Adam Smith (1916)
- Dugald Mackichan (1917)
- Robert James Drummond (1918)
- William Malcolm MacGregor (1919)
- Alexander Martin (1920)
- Adam Philip (1921)
- Donald Fraser (1922)
- David Smith Cairns (1923)
- Alexander Steven Inch (1924)
- James Harvey (1925)
- George Herbert Morrison (1926)
- James Weatherhead (1927)
- John Harry Miller (1928)

1929-

- 1929 James Barr BD
- 1930 Rev Charles Robson MA BD
- 1931 Rev J Sommerville Smith MA
- 1932 Rev David M Forrester DD
- 1933 Rev Adam Johnston Millar
- 1934 Rev Bruce B Blackwood BD LRAM
- 1935 Rev James Sneddon
- 1936 Rev Alfred M Merriweather
- 1937 Rev Samuel W Wilson MA
- 1938 Rev David G Young
- 1939 Rev Prof Allan Barr DD
- 1940 Rev Prof Allan Barr DD
- 1941 Mr James Goldie FEIS
- 1942 Rev Andrew McNab MA
- 1943 James Barr BD
- 1944 Rev Colin MacDonald
- 1945 Rev Peter M Shepherd OBE MD
- 1946 Rev Thomas F Crow
- 1947 Rev H Taylor Cape
- 1948 Rev George A Hardie
- 1949 Rev Frank Gardner FRGS
- 1950 Rev Peter MacLeod MA
- 1951 Rev Bruce B Blackwood BD LRAM
- 1952 Rev Alfred M Merriweather
- 1953 Rev Peter C MacIntosh
- 1954 Mr John Forrester-Paton CBE
- 1955 Rev J Howie Haldane
- 1956 Rev David W Roy
- 1957 Rev John A Paterson
- 1958 Rev James Porter MA
- 1959 Rev Francis Cougan
- 1960 Rev Elizabeth Barr BD
- 1961 Rev Alexander Innes MA
- 1962 Rev Ninian A P Bisset MA
- 1963 Rev Henry G McCall
- 1964 Rev Robert K MacDonald
- 1965 Rev Robertson Taylor BD
- 1966 Rev James Cassels MA
- 1967 Rev Alexander Ross
- 1968 Rev Colin MacDonald
- 1969 Rev Albert Petrie
- 1970 Rev Ernest Watson MA
- 1971 Rev Duncan S Mitchell
- 1972 Rev Henry L Brownlie
- 1973 Rev Robert Buchan
- 1974 Mr Robert S Clark
- 1975 Rev A Douglas Scrimgeour MA BD ThM
- 1976 Rev James P Young MA
- 1977 Rev Archibald A Small
- 1978 Rev Gregor Cameron MA
- 1979 Rev Dr A M Merriweather CBE PH
- 1980 Rev Joseph G McPhee
- 1981 Mr John Gray
- 1982 Rev David W Roy
- 1983 Mr Edward S Nicoll DFC
- 1984 Mr Andrew K M Rankin
- 1985 Rev William Johnston
- 1986 Rev James H Alexander
- 1987 Rev Thomas A B Patterson
- 1988 Rev Arthur M Lawless
- 1989 Rev James Cassels MA
- 1990 Rev Graeme B Bruce LTh
- 1991 Rev Andrew McG Begg
- 1992 Mr J Fergus Henderson
- 1993 Rev John A M McFie
- 1994 Rev John Billows
- 1995 Rev Joseph Creelman
- 1996 Rev Gordon L Cowan
- 1997 Rev James D Neil BD
- 1998 Rev John C Allan BD
- 1999 Rev A Douglas Scrimgeour MA BD ThM
- 2000 Rev John O Fulton BSc BD
- 2001 Rev Archie M Ford BSc
- 2002 Rev Colin C Brown BD
- 2003 Rev Donald Mackenzie
- 2004 Rev Stephen J W Matthews BD
- 2005 Rev James G Marshall CA BD
- 2006 Rev Andrew McMillan BD BA
- 2007 Rev David Cartledge BA
- 2008 Dr Donald Macdonald BSc MRSC
- 2009 Rev Martin C Keane BA BD
- 2010 Rev Robert Owens BA
- 2011 Mr George H McRobb
- 2112 Rev Iain F R Lloyd BSc BD
- 2013 Rev Graham G Brown BSc BD
- 2014 Rev Gary J A Barclay BD
- 2015 Mr Andrew Scott
- 2016 Rev Alexander Ritchie MA LLM BD MTh
- 2017 Rev I A Boa BSc BD ThM
- 2018 Mr John Cross
- 2019 Rev John O Fulton BSc BD
- 2020 No Assembly
- 2021 Rev Dr I David Miller BA BD MTh PhD
- 2022 Rev Archie M Ford BSc
- 2023 Rev Andrew Downie
- 2024 Rev Colin C Brown BD
- 2025 Rev Martin C Keane BA BD

== In literature and popular culture ==
The dispute over assets between the Free Church and the United Free Church was satirised by Neil Munro in his Erchie MacPherson story "Erchie and the Free Church", first published in the Glasgow Evening News on 8 August 1904.

== See also ==
- History of Scotland
- United and uniting churches
