= James Barr (politician) =

Scottish minister and politician (1862–1949)

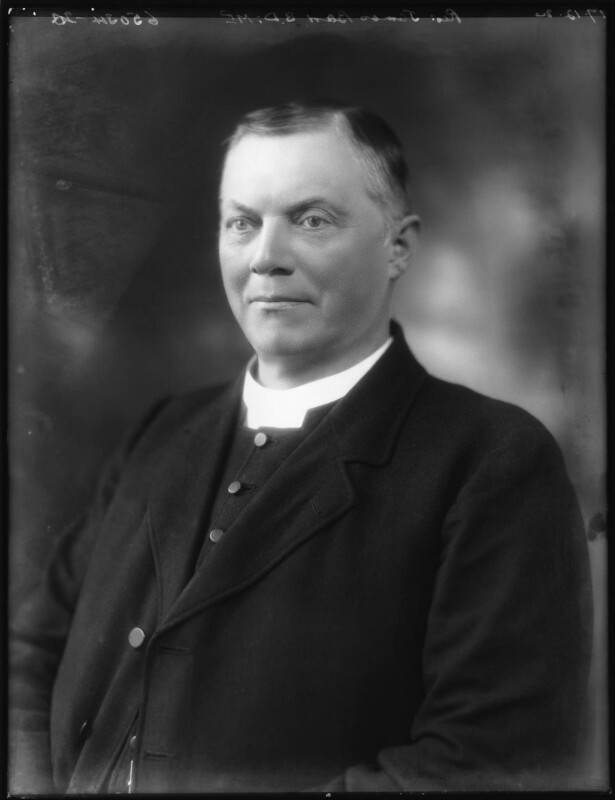
Barr in 1924

Reverend James Barr (26 July 1862 – 1949) was a Scottish minister and a British Liberal then Labour politician and a noted pacifist and socialist. He was also a strong supporter of home rule for Scotland, a minimum wage and the Temperance movement.

== Life ==
He was born on 26 July 1862 at Beanscroft Farm near Fenwick, East Ayrshire the son of Allan Barr a farmer and his wife Elizabeth Brown.

He studied a general degree at Glasgow University graduating MA in 1884. He returned to university around 1889 to study Divinity, graduating BD in 1892.

He was ordained as a minister of the Free Church of Scotland in 1889 serving Johnstone and Wamphray. In 1895 he became minister of Dennistoun in east Glasgow.

Barr was originally a Liberal but then joined the Independent Labour Party. He served as the Member of Parliament for Motherwell, from 1924 to 1931 and then for Coatbridge from 1935 to 1945. He was also the President of The Scottish Home Rule Association.

He served as Chairman of the Select committee on capital punishment, 1929–1930, which reported at the end of the latter year.

In 1930–1931, Barr was Chairman of the Liaison Committee, as the Chairman of the Parliamentary Labour Party was then known at any time when the party was in government.

A Presbyterian minister, Barr strongly opposed any link between church and state; in his view, the Church must support and maintain itself on an entirely voluntary basis. For this reason, he was a prominent member of the United Free Church of Scotland and he led the opposition to that group's reunion with the Church of Scotland in 1929; he and those of like mind did not participate in the reunion and continued as the United Free Church of Scotland, which is still in existence. In 1929, the year that the remainder of the United Free Church merged with the Church of Scotland, he was the first Moderator of the General Assembly of the United Free Church of Scotland Continuing, the section which refused to merge with the Church of Scotland.

His maiden speech as an MP was an attack on the Church of Scotland (Property and Endowments) Act 1925 and lasted just under an hour and a half.

== Private life ==
In 1890 he married Martha Wilson Stephen. They had five children including their last child who was the minister Elizabeth Barr. She was first woman in Scotland to be a Presbyterian minister.

Barr was the grandfather of James Barr (biblical scholar).

== Published works ==
- Barr, James (1903). Christianity and war, lectures. London.
- Barr, James (1916). The conscientious objector, a lecture. London.
- Great Britain. Parliament. House of Commons. Select Committee on Capital Punishment.; Rev. James Barr (Chairman) (1931). Report from the Select Committee on Capital Punishment : together with the proceedings of the Committee, and the minutes of evidence, taken before the Select Committee on Capital Punishment in 1929-1930, together with appendices and index. London: HMSO. cxiv, 681 pp.
- Barr, James (1941). Ignored speeches. London: Parliamentary Peace Aims Group.

Parliament of the United Kingdom
Preceded by Hugh Ferguson	Member of Parliament for Motherwell; 1924–1931	Succeeded by Thomas Ormiston
Preceded by William Paterson Templeton	Member of Parliament for Coatbridge; 1935–1945	Succeeded by Jean Mann
