= Jean Mann =

Scottish Labour politician and campaigner

Jean Mann JP
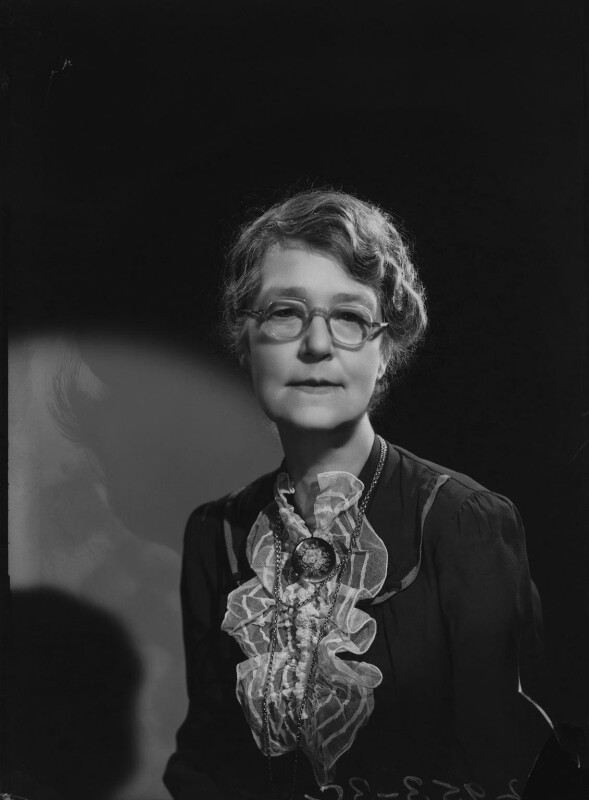
- Jean Mann (1946)

Member of Parliament for Coatbridge and Airdrie Coatbridge (1945–1950)
- In office 5 July 1945 – 8 October 1959
- Preceded by: James Barr
- Succeeded by: James Dempsey

Personal details
- Born: Jean Stewart; 2 July 1889
- Died: 21 March 1964 (aged 74)
- Party: Labour
- Other political affiliations: ILP (until 1932)
- Children: Five

Jean Mann JP (née Stewart; 2 July 1889 – 21 March 1964) was a Scottish Labour Party politician and a campaigner for better housing and planning. She was the third female Labour MP in Scotland. She was elected into the House of Commons on 5 July 1945 and left on 18 September 1959.

== Early life and political career ==
Mann's father was William Stewart, an iron moulder and active trade unionist, and was influential in sparking her passion for improving the lives of others.

Mann was educated at Bellahouston Academy in Glasgow and trained as an accountant. She became a secretary for her local Independent Labour Party (ILP) office, whilst a mother of 5 children (hence her nickname "haud the wean Jean", so called because of her insistence that party workers carry her baby while she was delivering a speech). She later progressed to becoming a senior magistrate and vice-chairman of the Labour Party in Scotland, and was elected a councillor on Glasgow Corporation in 1931. In that year's general election, Mann was the ILP's official candidate in West Renfrewshire without Labour's endorsement. She placed second. The following year, she left the ILP when it formally split from the Labour Party.

In 1933, she became the Corporation's housing convener, and was a supporter and advocate for the Garden City Movement. She was part of the Scottish branch of the Garden Cities and Town Planning Association (GCTPA), where she favoured low-rise developments over high-rise and wanted to use this model to improve the housing in Glasgow; it was, however, not financially viable at this time.

In September 1941, the Scottish Branch of the Housing and Town Planning Association (HTPA) organised a conference in Largs to draw attention to the Scottish evidence submitted to the Barlow Commission on the Distribution of the Industrial Population (1940). The conference papers and proceedings were afterwards published in a book titled Replanning Scotland, which was edited by Mann herself.

== Parliamentary career ==
In the Labour landslide at the 1945 general election, Mann was elected as Member of Parliament for Coatbridge. After she had taken the oath, it was realised that her position on the Rent Tribunals under the Rent of Furnished Houses Control (Scotland) Act 1943 was remunerated and that she therefore might hold an 'office of profit under the Crown' which would disqualify her from election. A Select Committee was established which reported that her election was invalid; a Bill was rushed through validating it and indemnifying her from the consequences of acting as an MP while disqualified.

Mann recognised that housing provision in her constituency was inadequate and addressed the issue in her maiden speech. She was quoted stating that the housing situation was “as bad as it possibly can be”, but that the saddest feature “is that which arises when a young woman is about to be confined", during a debate on 25 October 1945.

On 19 February 1947, Mann introduced the epithet "twerp" to the House of Commons when referring to a character in the popular radio comedy programme It's That Man Again, during a debate on supplementary estimates.

During her time in parliament she focused on issues that affected low-paid women, housewives and their families. Fire safety was of great importance to her, as she had lost one of her own children in a fire and, in 1959 she successfully campaigned for better regulation on flammable textile fabrics. The 1950s were, however, turbulent years for Labour, with rows erupting once again between the left and the right of the party. Mann’s opposition to the left-wing Bevanites gained enough approval from right-wing trade unionists to help her secure a seat on the party's NEC in 1953, but when, two years later, she voted not to expel Aneurin Bevan from the party for disloyalty–a move that displayed both her independence and strength of character—she came under attack from the right wing of the party. She stood down at the 1959 general election.

== Gallery ==
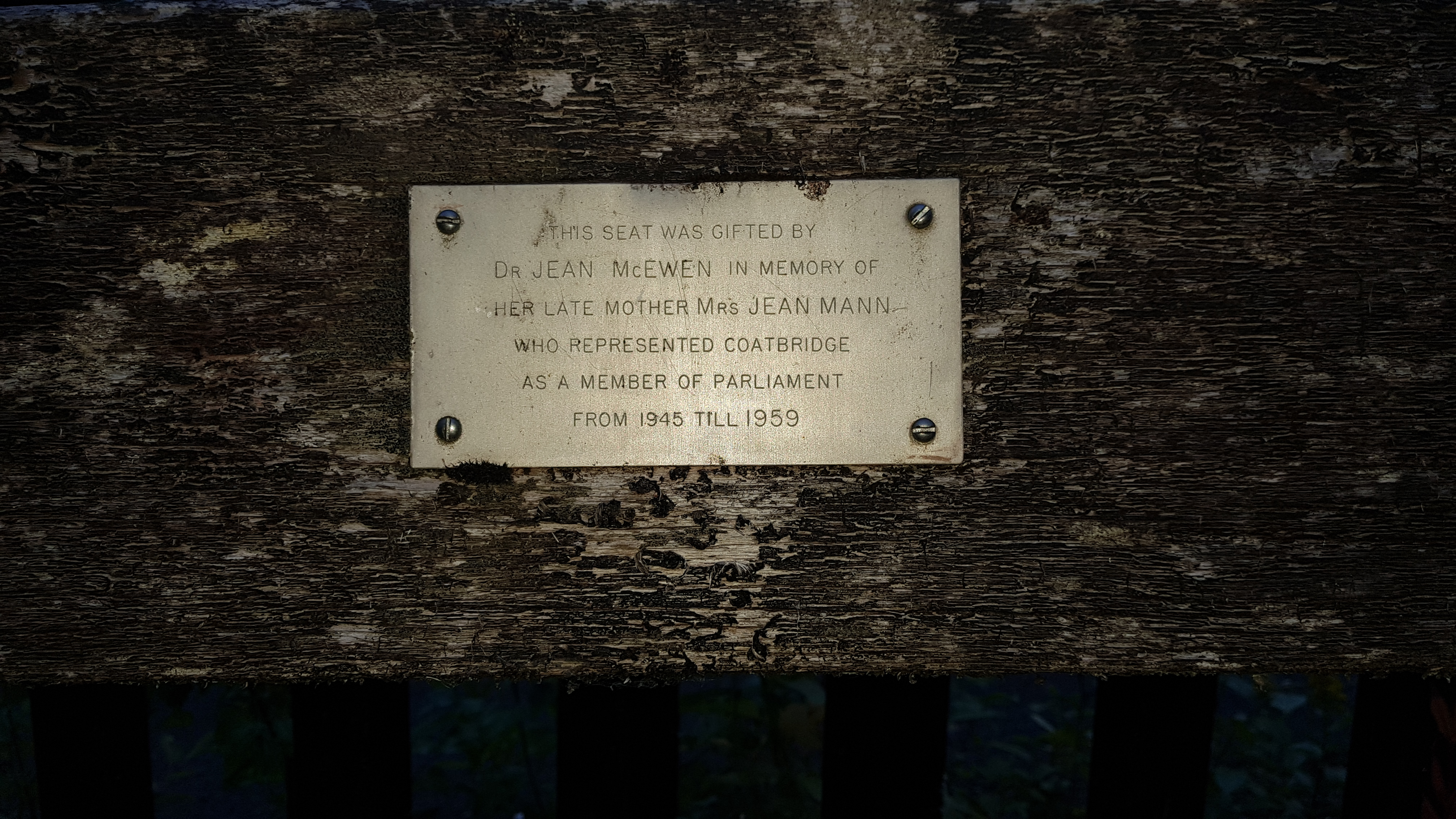
Jean Mann dedication plaque in Drumpellier Country Park

== Bibliography ==
- Mann, Jean (Ed.) (1941), Replanning Scotland, Town and Country Planning Association (Scotland).
- Mann, Jean (1962). Woman in Parliament. London: Oldhams Press.

Parliament of the United Kingdom
| Preceded by James Barr | Member of Parliament for Coatbridge; 1945–1950 | Constituency abolished |
| New constituency | Member of Parliament for Coatbridge and Airdrie; 1950–1959 | Succeeded by James Dempsey |
