= A. L. H. Buchanan =

British politician

Lieutenant-Colonel Arthur Louis Hamilton Buchanan, OBE (1866 – 15 February 1925) was a British Army officer and politician. He was Coalition Unionist Party MP for Coatbridge from 1918 to 1922.

He was appointed a Lieutenant in the 4th Battalion of the Devonshire Regiment with effect from 16 February 1884, and transferred to the Gordon Highlanders on 28 April 1886. He was appointed Lieutenant-Colonel of the 3rd Battalion, the Gordon Highlanders from 2 June 1906.

Buchanan saw service during both the Second Boer War and the First World War. He was appointed an OBE in 1919 "for valuable service rendered in connection with military operations in France".

Parliament of the United Kingdom
New constituency	Member of Parliament for Coatbridge; 1918 – 1922	Succeeded by James C. Welsh
