= Robert Nelson (British politician) =

British politician

Robert Frederick William Robertson Nelson (29 February 1888 – 1 December 1932) was Unionist Party MP for Motherwell.

He was elected in 1918 as a supporter of David Lloyd George's coalition government. He stood down in 1922 for health reasons.

A businessman, Nelson followed his father's steps and was chairman and managing director of Hurst, Nelson & Co. (Limited), The Glasgow Rolling Stock and Plant Works, Motherwell, and chairman of Wagon Repairs, Ltd, Birmingham.

He was educated at Trinity College, Glenalmond.
