= 1954 Motherwell by-election =

UK parliamentary by-election

The 1954 Motherwell by-election was held on 14 April 1954. It was held due to the death of the incumbent Labour MP, Alexander Anderson. It was retained by the Labour candidate, George Lawson.

== Background ==
Alexander Anderson was born in April 1888 and had represented Motherwell since the general election of 1945. According to the London correspondent for The Glasgow Herald, Anderson had visibly been in failing health during his final session in parliament. He had collapsed in the House of Commons shortly before his death, but he had insisted on remaining at Westminster so that he could participate in a session of the Scottish Grand Committee scheduled to be held on the morning of 12 February. However he died the previous day.

For the by-election, Labour chose George Lawson, who was the secretary of Edinburgh Trades Council. Lawson had previously been West of Scotland organiser of Labour Colleges and was a member of the Scottish Advisory Committee of the Labour Party. Norman Sloan, an advocate, who had been Anderson's only opponent in 1951 again stood as a Conservative and National Liberal. At his final election meeting on the eve of the poll, Sloan was supported by Lord Home.

== Result ==
Motherwell by-election, 1954
Party	Candidate	Votes	%	±%
Labour	George Lawson	19,163	56.4	−0.9
National Liberal	Norman Sloan	13,334	39.3	−3.5
Communist	John Gollan	1,457	4.3	New
Majority		5,829	17.1	+2.6
Turnout		33,954		
Labour hold		Swing		

== Aftermath ==
Labour held the seat, with a slightly reduced share of the vote, while Sloan's vote declined by over 3%. The Communist candidate picked up just over 4% of the votes cast.

The victorious Lawson said that he had fought the election on the issues of rising food prices and "the increasing threat of unemployment, particularly in Scotland and especially in this area", the "callous disregard" for pensioners and people on low incomes and "the failure of private enterprise" to enable British industry to compete with its competitors.
