= Monklands West =

UK Parliament constituency (1983–1997)

- Former burgh constituency for the House of Commons
- Subdivision: Monklands

1983–1997
- Seats: One
- Created from: Bothwell, Coatbridge & Airdrie, Central Dunbartonshire, North Lanarkshire and West Stirlingshire
- Replaced by: Coatbridge & Chryston and Strathkelvin & Bearsden

Monklands West was a constituency represented in the House of Commons of the Parliament of the United Kingdom from 1983 until 1997. It elected one Member of Parliament (MP), using the first-past-the-post voting system.

It was then replaced by the Coatbridge & Chryston constituency.

== Boundaries ==
The Monklands District electoral divisions of Coatbridge North and Coatbridge South, and the Strathkelvin District electoral division of Chryston and Kelvin Valley.

== Members of Parliament ==
Election	Member	Party
1983	Tom Clarke	Labour
1997	constituency abolished: see Coatbridge & Chryston and Strathkelvin & Bearsden	

== Election results ==
=== Elections of the 1980s ===
General election 1983: Monklands West
Party	Candidate	Votes	%	±%
Labour	Tom Clarke	20,642	54.2	−8.0
Conservative	Laurence Cameron	8,378	22.0	−7.9
SDP	Rodney Ackland	6,605	17.3	
SNP	George Lyon	2,473	6.5	−1.3
Majority		12,264	32.2	−0.1
Turnout		38,098	75.7	
Labour win (new seat)				

General election 1987: Monklands West
Party	Candidate	Votes	%	±%
Labour	Tom Clarke	24,449	62.3	+8.1
Conservative	Gordon Lind	6,166	15.7	−6.3
SDP	Anne McQueen	4,408	11.2	−6.1
SNP	Keith Bovey	4,260	10.8	+4.3
Majority		18,333	46.6	+14.4
Turnout		39,333	77.3	+1.6
Labour hold		Swing	+7.2	

=== Elections of the 1990s ===
General election 1992: Monklands West
Party	Candidate	Votes	%	±%
Labour	Tom Clarke	23,384	61.3	−1.0
SNP	Keith Bovey	6,319	16.6	+5.8
Conservative	Andrew Lownie	6,074	15.9	+0.2
Liberal Democrats	Shiona Hamilton	2,382	6.2	−5.0
Majority		17,065	44.7	−1.9
Turnout		38,159	77.4	+0.1
Labour hold		Swing		
