= Curzon Ultimatum =

British ultimatum to Soviet Union

The United Kingdom memorandum to the government of the RSFSR
- Type: Ultimatum
- Context: The Curzon Ultimatum was issued to the Soviet Government by the British Foreign Minister, demanding a cessation of Soviet revolutionary agitation in Southern and Islamic Asia.
- Drafted: 8 May 1923
- Signed: 9 June 1923
- Signatories: Maxim Litvinov; Leonid Krasin; Georgy Chicherin; Lord Curzon
- Parties: United Kingdom; Soviet Union

The Curzon Ultimatum was a British ultimatum delivered by British Foreign Secretary Lord Curzon to the Soviet government on the 8 May 1923. The ultimatum was a response to heightened Soviet revolutionary agitation in Islamic Asia and India, areas under British influence or control. The Ultimatum called for the Soviet Union to completely cease its revolutionary agitation and operations in Afghanistan, Persia (Iran) and India, including the withdrawal of Comintern envoys in those regions. The ultimatum threatened to cut diplomatic and strategic trade ties with the Soviet Union if it refused.

On 4 June 1923, the Soviet Union agreed to these demands, not willing to sever newly built economic ties with the United Kingdom that were necessary to their industrial development. The negotiations were hailed as a success by both Lord Curzon and the Soviet Government, as Britain was able to ward off Communist revolutionary activity, whilst the Soviet Union maintained their trade relations.

== See also ==
- Government Communications Headquarters (GCHQ)
- Ministry of Foreign Affairs (Soviet Union)
- Revolutionary movement for Indian independence
