= Coatbridge and Chryston (UK Parliament constituency) =

UK Parliament constituency (1997–2005)

- Former burgh constituency for the House of Commons
- Boundary of Coatbridge and Chryston in Scotland for the 2001 general election
- Subdivisions of Scotland: Monklands

1997–2005
- Seats: One
- Created from: Monklands West
- Replaced by: Coatbridge, Chryston & Bellshill

Coatbridge and Chryston was a constituency represented in the House of Commons of the Parliament of the United Kingdom. It returned one Member of Parliament (MP) from 1997 until 2005.

It was then replaced by the Coatbridge, Chryston & Bellshill constituency.

== Boundaries ==
The Monklands District electoral divisions of Coatbridge North and East, and Coatbridge South; and the Strathkelvin District electoral division of Chryston.

== Members of Parliament ==
Election	Member	Party
1997	Tom Clarke	Labour
2005	constituency abolished: see Coatbridge, Chryston & Bellshill	

== Election results ==
=== Elections of the 2000s ===
General election 2001: Coatbridge and Chryston
Party	Candidate	Votes	%	±%
Labour	Tom Clarke	19,807	65.3	−3.0
SNP	Peter Kearney	4,493	14.8	−2.2
Liberal Democrats	Alistair Tough	2,293	7.6	+2.2
Conservative	Walter Ross-Taylor	2,171	7.2	−1.4
Scottish Socialist	Lynn Sheridan	1,547	5.1	New
Majority		15,314	50.5	−0.8
Turnout		30,311	58.1	−14.2
Labour hold		Swing		

=== Elections of the 1990s ===
General election 1997: Coatbridge and Chryston
Party	Candidate	Votes	%	±%
Labour	Tom Clarke	25,694	68.3	
SNP	Brian Nugent	6,402	17.0	
Conservative	Andrew Wauchope	3,216	8.6	
Liberal Democrats	Morag E. Daly	2,048	5.4	
Referendum	Bernard Bowsley	249	0.7	
Majority		19,292	51.3	
Turnout		37,609	72.3	
Labour win (new seat)				
