= List of Utopia episodes =

Utopia is a British conspiracy thriller television series broadcast on the UK TV station Channel 4. Two series were produced, consisting of six episodes each. In 2014, the series was cancelled after two seasons, with the broadcasters commenting that the canceling the show was "a necessary part of being able to commission new drama."

== Series overview ==
Series	Episodes	Originally released	
Series	Episodes	First released	Last released
1	6	15 January 2013	19 February 2013
2	6	14 July 2014	12 August 2014

== Episodes ==
=== Series 1 (2013) ===
No.	Title	Directed by	Written by	Original release date	UK viewers (millions)
1	"Episode 1"	Marc Munden	Dennis Kelly	15 January 2013	1.70
Two men, Arby and Lee, murder everyone in a comic shop, including a young boy, for the location of the unpublished sequel to underground graphic novel The Utopia Experiments. DHSC private secretary Michael Dugdale is blackmailed over impregnating prostitute Anya Lutchenko, tricking the Secretary of Health into ordering a vaccine for the harmless Russian flu. He realizes the operation involves Corvadt pharmaceutical company CEO Conran Letts, and Geoff Lawson, who steps in as secretary after the current one resigns over the fallout from the order. Becky, Ian Johnson, and Wilson Wilson, members of a Utopia fan forum, agree to meet with a member who claims to possess the sequel's manuscript. He is waylaid by Arby and Lee, who kill him, which is witnessed by Grant Leetham, a young forum member who steals the manuscript. Ian and Becky spend the night at Wilson's place, where they drunkenly attempt to have sex. Wilson investigates the member's "suicide," prompting Arby to kill the detective working the case. Becky tells Ian that Deel's, the hereditary neurodegenerative disease that killed her father, was seemingly predicted by the first Utopia. Lee tracks down and tortures Wilson, removing his right eye when he cannot answer Arby's question of "Where is Jessica Hyde?" Wilson escapes his restraints and shoots Lee. He hides with Ian and Becky, and they are met by a woman who introduces herself as Jessica Hyde.
2	"Episode 2"	Marc Munden	Dennis Kelly	22 January 2013	1.45
Dugdale is approached by journalist William Kaye, who asks him to give a vaccine sample to scientist Christian Donaldson, while a deadly flu outbreak occurs in Fetlar and Dugdale is praised for his supposed foresight. He requests a sample from Letts, who reveals that Anya has been framed for killing Kaye. Jessica explains that the group is being pursued by the "Network", a conglomerate of government powers that operates above the law. The Network was created by "Mr. Rabbit" and her father Philip Carvel, a geneticist who was smuggled into a psychiatric facility under a fake name, where he wrote Utopia. Jessica visits the publisher of Utopia, only to learn that he committed suicide after mailing the manuscript. She realizes his "wife" is a CIA agent and interrogates her, learning that an ex-Network agent visited the publisher before he died. Jessica learns from him that Carvel was working on "Janus" before his death and gets the name of his MI5 contact, Milner, but kills him when she deems him untrustworthy. Becky learns that Wilson's father Milton was murdered, which Jessica lied to him about earlier to keep him docile. The group is forced to flee the house they are staying in when the owners return, and they pick up Grant, who has befriended and left the manuscript with schoolgirl Alice Ward. Arby, tracking the group, kills the CIA agent and the homeowners.
3	"Episode 3"	Marc Munden	Dennis Kelly	29 January 2013	1.42
Arby kills several children at Grant's school while wearing gloves with his fingerprints, but is quietly distressed when a boy drops chocolate-covered raisins, a food he enjoys. He asks Letts about his childhood, who says that he was experimented on by Carvel. Becky, Ian and Wilson call Milner, who directs them to a meeting spot where she saves them from a Network agent. She tells them that the manuscript contains Mr. Rabbit's real name, explaining that he was tortured by a Chinese crime boss who carved the Han for "rabbit" into his stomach, prompting him to kill everyone present to protect his true identity. While Grant is framed as the shooter, Jessica bonds with him to press him into giving up the manuscript. He takes her to Alice's just as Arby, posing as a police officer, arrives with her. He kills her mother, so after removing pages and giving them to Grant, Jessica trades the manuscript for Alice's life. At Donaldson's behest, Dugdale sneaks into Fetlar's quarantine zone and cuts off a corpse's finger, realizing along the way that the outbreak was faked. Geoff threatens to have Dugdale's wife Jen, who he is trying to conceive with, raped if he does not give up the finger. He does, though he keeps a piece hidden.
4	"Episode 4"	Alex García López & Wayne Che Yip	Dennis Kelly	5 February 2013	1.52
Donaldson's testing reveals that the Fetlar deaths were caused by chemical poisoning. Dugdale tries to deal for Anya's release, so Geoff has Jen informed of his infidelity. Arby reads the manuscript and is disturbed by his inclusion in it, forcing Letts to give him Jessica's location. Letts tells him that his name is derived from the acronym of "Raisin Boy" and that his real name is "Pietre". He allows himself to be captured by Jessica. Wilson finds that Grant drew sketches of the manuscript, noting that its depiction of the god Janus shares a symbol with that of the food production company Pergus, theorizing that Janus is in the vaccine. Missing his brother Roy, Ian disguises himself and tries to meet him in public, but Milner stops him and informs him that Pergus's CEO, Lane Monroe, is a former CIA scientist. The group breaks into Monroe's apartment, where he can only tell them that he put a protein in the food. Wilson sees a newspaper article about Milton's murder and is horrified to learn that Becky and Ian hid it from him. Before he can kill Monroe, Letts stops by with a vaccine sample. The kids are left to guard Monroe and a traumatized Alice kills him, forcing the group to detain Letts.
5	"Episode 5"	Alex García López & Wayne Che Yip	Dennis Kelly	12 February 2013	Less Than 1.21
Dugdale bargains with Geoff for Anya's freedom for his silence. Jen makes a deal to financially support her in exchange for her baby. Arby admits to Jessica that, as a boy, he tortured and killed her mentor Christos. He takes her to the abandoned facility he grew up in where he has hidden the manuscript. Before giving it to her, he reveals that he has the same piece of tonalite as her, given to them by their father, Carvel. Becky meets with Donaldson, who she has been secretly feeding information on the manuscript in exchange for thoraxin, a drug that quells her Deel's. Letts confirms that the Network manufactured Deel's and notes that, via a phone given to the group by Milner, they have always had the group's location. He explains that the Network's remade Janus will sterilize 95% of the world when activated by the food protein, halting resource decline and saving humanity from extinction. Ian and Becky are horrified, but Wilson seems to agree with the idea. Ian and Becky confront Milner, where she insists that she had to bug them to keep up appearances, and shows them her son, dying of Deel's, to regain their trust. She mentions Dugdale as potentially trustworthy. Ian and the kids take the vaccine to him and he calls the police, getting Grant arrested. Wilson frees Letts and stabs himself to make it look like he escaped. Letts returns to Corvadt, where his assistant orders Geoff to kill him, which he reluctantly does.
6	"Episode 6"	Alex García López & Wayne Che Yip	Dennis Kelly	19 February 2013	Less Than 1.15
As Jessica returns with the manuscript, Alice finds Grant's hidden pages, and the group learns that Mr. Rabbit's name is "Letan". Wilson searches databases for the name and finds the meeting notes of a genetics committee, printing out pictures of the men in attendance. Becky refuses to give Donaldson the manuscript, so he throws away the thoraxin. Ian confronts Dugdale as he visits Anya, who attacks them and reveals herself as a Network agent. Dugdale accidentally kills her in a struggle and joins the group, identifying the assistant from the meeting photos. With the vaccines going out the next day as the Network fakes a flu pandemic, Jessica and Wilson go to kill him while the rest go to a Corvadt warehouse, where they are captured but saved by Milner. The assistant orders Grant to complete his sketch of a manuscript page featuring Janus's molecular structure, being left with a live feed of his mother to motivate him. He kills the assistant with the laptop's battery and finds the Han on his stomach as Jessica arrives with Wilson, who holds her at gunpoint. She stabs him and leaves with Grant while the group burns the warehouse. Milner has Ian and Becky, who decide to pursue a relationship, leave by train with Grant until she clears his name, while Alice, who has bonded with Dugdale, is adopted by him. As Becky has a Deel's-induced seizure at the train station and leaves without Ian, Jessica takes the manuscript to Milner, but notices the tonalite on her desk and realizes she is Mr. Rabbit. Jessica burns the manuscript, but Milner shoots her and reveals that Carvel put Janus inside of her.

=== Series 2 (2014) ===
A second six-part series of Utopia was commissioned by Channel 4, going into production in late 2013. Kudos Film and Television announced that series 2 would air in July 2014, which it did.

No.	Title	Directed by	Written by	Original release date	UK viewers (millions)
7	"Episode 1"	Marc Munden	Dennis Kelly	14 July 2014	0.90
In 1974, Milner meets Carvel and is taken by his plans for Janus, deciding to fund his research. As he posits using Janus for eugenics, he tries to inhibit violence in Pietre by drugging his raisins and slaughtering rabbits in front of him, but only desensitizes him. Milner develops an obsession with Carvel, manufacturing excuses to kill his team and her husband out of jealousy of his wife, who dies giving birth to Jessica. By 1979, Carvel has finished Janus but is trying to expose Milner as she takes on the Mr. Rabbit identity, and she refuses the assistant's recommendation to kill him. Carvel and his children are moved to a Network base in Three Mile Island, while Milner rigs the general election in Margaret Thatcher's favor for Airey Neave. As Carvel makes an "adjustment" to Janus, Milner has him tortured when he refuses to give it to her. An arriving Christos triggers a meltdown at the plant, distracting her and allowing him to free Carvel. Carvel abandons Pietre and flees with Jessica after injecting her with Janus, which Milner sees on security footage as she has Neave killed for defying her. Christos gives Jessica the "Hyde" surname and has a broken Carvel institutionalized, where he begins drawing Utopia.
8	"Episode 2"	Marc Munden	Dennis Kelly	15 July 2014	0.79
Dugdale is made temporary CEO of Corvadt as Milner plans "V-Day", a worldwide effort to distribute vaccines with the perfected Janus inside simultaneously, which she orders Geoff to announce. While responsible for an aggravated Grant, whose name was not cleared, Ian searches for Becky, who is staying with Donaldson for thoraxin. Suspicious of his colleague's new book on Deel's, he and Becky break into his house and find that he is getting his knowledge from Anton, an old man who does not speak English. Arby, now dating a woman named Tess and friendly with her daughter Amanda, is approached by Lee, who brings him back to the Network. Milner sends him to kill Donaldson for "what he knows" as Ian finds Becky on CCTV. As the two awkwardly reunite, Arby saves them from Network men, fleeing with them, Donaldson, Anton, and Grant. After five months of Network torture, an agent attempts to manipulate Jessica into explaining Carvel's adjustment, only for her to reveal that she lied about knowing to stay alive and suspend him in a noose constructed from pages of the Bible he gave her. Milner lets him die while Jessica steals a spring from his pen.
9	"Episode 3"	Marc Munden	Dennis Kelly & John Donnelly	22 July 2014	0.65
Lee kills Ian's boss and frames him for the murder, and is sent with Wilson, now a Network agent, to track the group down. Wilson confronts Lee, who confirms he killed Milton. When Donaldson mentions Googling a name given to him by his now deceased ex-Network professor Dobri Gorski, Arby takes the group to young hacker Ben who explains that the name is code for a powerful flu virus. Arby later returns alone and has Ben create three new identities before killing him to cover it up. Lee arrives, and Arby agrees to help get Donaldson in exchange for Amanda and Tess's safety. Ian and Becky see Anton, who briefly spoke English after seeing something on the news, drawing in a style identitcal to Utopia and realize he is Carvel, which they agree to keep secret as they reconcile. Donaldson spitfeully tells Ian that Becky was helping him get the manuscript. A Corvadt scientist finds Janus in the vaccine and goes to Dugdale, who calls the Network to have her killed. Out of options, Milner consents to having Jessica's brain operated on to discover the adjustment, but she picks her restraints with the spring and escapes. Ian calls Milner to report that Carvel is alive, but hangs up when she accidentally reveals she knows he is with Becky. Dugdale comes home to find Jessica waiting for him.
10	"Episode 4"	Sam Donovan	Dennis Kelly & John Donnelly	29 July 2014	0.71
During the previous episode, an American man gets a call that prompts him to retrieve a hidden canister, hide it in a parked car, and kill his family and himself. Lee helps Arby hide Amanda and Tess with their new identities before killing Donaldson. As tension grows between Ian and Becky, he steals the news clip that startled Carvel before visiting Dugdale, finding Jessica instead, who seduces him. She hides a phone in his jacket before he leaves. Becky hires a translator, who determines that Carvel is speaking Romani, and they learn that he is a Holocaust survivor who wanted to use Janus to prevent future genocides. Becky apologizes to Ian for helping Donaldson, and Carvel, after seeing the clip with the story of the American family on the ticker, explains that there are sleeper agents in each family who kill to cover the Network's activities, and draws the structure of Janus with the adjustment included. Arby returns and, after learning Carvel's identity, abducts him and Grant, who is wearing Ian's jacket. As Wilson expresses hesistance about V-Day, Milner explains the plan; a sleeper agent will travel to five points across the world, releasing canisters of a potent flu, to get people to take the vaccine. She takes him to Roy, who she has captured to lure Ian out of hiding, and reveals her identity as Mr. Rabbit in front of them. She goes to Dugdale and determines that he is harboring Jessica, who captures but does not kill her when she reveals that Carvel is alive. Wilson kills Roy to protect Milner's identity.
11	"Episode 5"	Sam Donovan	Dennis Kelly	5 August 2014	TBD
Jessica sends a photo of her holding Milner hostage to dissuade the Network from pursuing Carvel before taking her to follow the jacket phone's signal. Wilson deduces that Dugdale is helping them when he notices Alice's drawing left in the photo, while Geoff, his career ruined after announcing V-Day, blackmails the Network for money. As Ian is framed for Roy's murder, he and Becky go to Dugdale as Wilson arrives. Wilson has Carvel's drawing analyzed and learns something that horrifies him, while Becky helps Dugdale rescue Jen and Alice, who have been held by the Network to keep him in line. Arby heads for an old Network base with Carvel and Grant, who wants to prove himself as capable. Jessica and Milner catch up with them, and Milner asks Carvel about the adjustment while Arby reveals Ben's third identity is for Jessica. Carvel admits that he chose Roma as the race Janus will leave fertile, and Milner presses him to kill his children, though he only shoots Arby and allows Jessica to escape. Wilson arrives with Ian and informs Milner that Janus actually prevents the vaccine from working on all but Roma people, though she still gives sleeper agent Terrence Truman the order to release the canisters. Before Wilson can force her to call him off, Grant shoots her, overcome with remorse when Ian stops him from killing Wilson and Milner dies in Carvel's arms.
12	"Episode 6"	Sam Donovan	Dennis Kelly	12 August 2014	TBD
As Terrence collects the locations of the flu canisters, Becky, Ian and Wilson search another agent's house and find that he recently called Gorski, who faked his death. They get Terrence's name from him, who tracks down and kills him in police custody. Jessica and Ian intervene as Terrence retrieves the Britain canister, and Ian is forced to kill him before he can open it. Jessica stops Lee from killing a hospitalized Arby. As Becky plans to commit suicide with her Deel's causing her to hallucinate, she asks Ian to be with her when she dies, only for Jessica, wanting him for herself, to manipulate her into attempting without him. Ian learns from Carvel that "thoraxin" is an opiate Donaldson was using to keep Becky compliant and she is merely suffering from withdrawals, only for her to overdose, forcing Ian to resuscitate her. Grant is taken in by the Dugdales, who is at first morose and violent until Jen gets through to him. Dugdale plans to leave the country with his family, only for Wilson, who is planning to go through with V-Day by releasing the flu in remote areas, to threaten him into staying. Geoff is given his payout but dies, the money dusted with a deadly toxin. Wilson kills Lee and, as Network agents capture the group and Arby wakes up, carves the Han for rabbit into his stomach before entering a storage container, where the five flu canisters have been assembled.
