= Utopia (British TV series) =

British television conspiracy thriller

- Also known as: Iwtopia (Wales)
- Genre: Conspiracy thriller; Mystery; Action; Science fiction; Black comedy
- Created by: Dennis Kelly
- Based on: an original idea by: Huw Kennair-Jones; Mark Aldridge; Clare McDonald
- Written by: Dennis Kelly; John Donnelly
- Directed by: Marc Munden; Wayne Yip; Alex García López; Sam Donovan
- Starring: Alexandra Roach; Nathan Stewart-Jarrett; Paul Higgins; Fiona O'Shaughnessy; Adeel Akhtar; Oliver Woollford; Neil Maskell; Geraldine James
- Composer: Cristobal Tapia de Veer
- Country of origin: United Kingdom
- Original language: English
- No. of series: 2
- No. of episodes: 12 (list of episodes)

Production
- Executive producers: Karen Wilson; Jane Featherstone; Dennis Kelly
- Producer: Rebekah Wray-Rogers
- Production locations: Liverpool, England
- Cinematography: Ole Bratt Birkeland (series 1); Lol Crawley (series 2)
- Editors: Luke Dunkley; David Charap
- Running time: 45–62 minutes
- Production company: Kudos

Original release
- Network: Channel 4
- Release: 15 January 2013 – 12 August 2014

Utopia is a British conspiracy thriller television series that was originally broadcast on Channel 4. The show was written by Dennis Kelly and starred Fiona O'Shaughnessy, Adeel Akhtar, Paul Higgins, Nathan Stewart-Jarrett, Alexandra Roach, Oliver Woollford, Alistair Petrie, and Neil Maskell. The show has since gained a cult following.

In October 2014, the series' official Twitter feed stated there would not be a third series. HBO had originally planned to make an American version of the show in 2014, but did not produce it due to budget disputes. Amazon then acquired the rights to the series as of April 2018, and an American version was released on 25 September 2020. Initially nearly inaccessible to the U.S. market, both of the original series were released on Amazon Prime on 1 November 2020.

== Synopsis ==
A community of comic book fans believe the graphic novel The Utopia Experiments predicted several disastrous epidemics, such as mad cow disease (BSE). A rumoured unpublished sequel supposedly contains further information on future world events. When one Utopia enthusiast procures the manuscript, he invites four of his friends from an online forum to meet in real life before he gets killed. However, after getting their hands on the manuscript, the four – Ian, Becky, Wilson, and Grant – find themselves in over their heads, as a secret organization only known as "The Network" is after it. They find their lives systematically dismantled, while The Network operatives kill anyone in their way as they hunt for the manuscript and someone named Jessica Hyde.

Jessica, who has been on the run from The Network her entire life, meets with the group and helps them evade capture. Meanwhile, other characters find themselves ensnared in The Network's orbit, and through their interactions with its agents, the organization's purpose and secret plot come into focus. The closer people come to understanding what's truly going on, the more dangerous things become. As rumours of "Russian flu" proliferate worldwide and a variety of groups and individuals close in on the protagonists, they try to solve the web of mysteries and conspiracies around them.

== Episodes ==
Series	Episodes	Originally released	
Series	Episodes	First released	Last released
1	6	15 January 2013	19 February 2013
2	6	14 July 2014	12 August 2014

== Cast ==
=== Main ===
- Fiona O'Shaughnessy as Jessica Hyde, a woman who has been on the run from The Network for as long as she can remember. Her father, Philip Carvel, created the Utopia manuscripts. Aine Garvey portrays a young Jessica.
- Alexandra Roach as Becky, a post-grad student. Convinced there is a conspiracy surrounding her father's death connected to the Utopia manuscript, she is determined to find out the truth. She suffers from the mysterious "Deel's syndrome," for which she has been taking medication.
- Nathan Stewart-Jarrett as Ian Johnson, an IT consultant who still lives with his mother.
- Adeel Akhtar as Wilson Wilson, a survivalist conspiracy theorist. He finds his loyalties divided as he learns more about The Network's plans.
- Oliver Woollford as Grant Leetham, a troubled 11-year-old boy. Originally pretending to be an adult online, he ends up with the Utopia manuscript. He is later framed for a school shooting and forced to go on the run.
- Paul Higgins as Michael Dugdale, a civil servant who finds himself blackmailed by The Network over his affair with a Russian prostitute.
- Neil Maskell as Arby/Piètre, a Network agent searching for Jessica Hyde and the Utopia manuscript. He is unstable and emotionally disconnected. Mason and Harley Rooney portray a Young Arby.
- Geraldine James as Milner, an MI5 agent whom the group turns to for help. Rose Leslie portrays a younger Milner.

=== Recurring ===
- Ruth Gemmell as Jen Dugdale, Michael's wife.
- Emilia Jones as Alice Ward, a schoolgirl who becomes embroiled in the conspiracy after Grant meets her and hides the Utopia manuscript in her bedroom.
- Alistair Petrie as Geoff Lawson, Secretary of State for Health and Michael's boss, an inside man for The Network.
- Paul Ready as Lee, Arby's partner. He takes a special delight in interrogation and torture.
- Simon McBurney (series 1) and Michael Maloney (series 2) as Christian Donaldson, a scientist whom Michael asks for help.
- James Fox as Letts' Assistant (series 1–2). Ed Birch portrays a younger Assistant.
- Stephen Rea as Conran Letts (series 1), the acting CEO of Corvadt, a biological sciences company and apparent head of The Network.
- Anna Madeley as Anya Levchenko (series 1), a Russian sex worker with whom Michael is having an affair.
- Mark Stobbart as Bejan Chervo (series 1), the finder of the Utopia II manuscript who invites Ian, Becky, Grant and Wilson to meet him. Before he can do so, he is murdered by Arby and Lee.
- Sylvestra Le Touzel as Leah Gorsand (series 2), CEO of Rochane Foundation, an NGO funding the Russian flu vaccine campaign, underwriting the cost for countries that cannot afford it.
- Ian McDiarmid as 'Anton' (series 2), a confused old Romanian who is in fact the scientist Philip Carvel, the long thought dead creator of The Utopia Experiments. Tom Burke portrays a younger Carvel.
- Gerard Monaco as Joe (series 1–2), Ian's colleague.

=== Guest ===
- Michael Smiley as Detective Inspector Joshua Reynolds (series 1), a police officer investigating Bejan's death.
- Alan Bentley as Scientist (series 1–2). Ian Porter portrays a younger Scientist.
- Eleanor Matsuura as Bev (series 1), Michael's colleague who signs off on the purchase of the Russian flu vaccine.
- Anca-Ioana Androne as Brosca (series 2), Philip Carvel's wife.
- Tim McInnerny as Airey Neave (series 2), a politician who received information from Philip Carvel through ambassador Richard Sykes.
- Emil Hostina as Marius (series 2), a Romanian translator whom Becky, Grant, and Ian use to communicate with Anton/Philip Carvel.
- Kevin Eldon as Tony Bradley (series 2), a scientist and author of a book on Deel's Syndrome.
- Will Attenborough as Ben (series 2), a member of a hacking collective who assists the main characters.
- Juliet Cowan as Bridget (series 2), a scientist colleague of Michael who notices discrepancies in government plans for the Russian flu vaccine.
- Sacha Dhawan as Paul Simpson (series 2), a Network sleeper agent.
- Steven Robertson as Terrence Truman (series 2), another Network sleeper agent.
- David Calder as Dobri Gorski (series 2), Donaldson's former professor who attempted to fake his death to evade The Network.
- Dara Ó Briain as himself
- Jon Snow as himself

== Production ==
In April 2012, Channel 4 announced that it had commissioned a six-episode drama series titled Utopia. The series was written by Dennis Kelly and produced by Kudos Film and Television. Marc Munden was chosen as the director, Rebekah Wray-Rogers the producer, and Dennis Kelly, Jane Featherstone, and Karen Wilson the executive producers.

=== Conception and development ===
Kudos Film and Television approached Kelly with an idea about a conspiracy hidden inside a graphic novel. Kelly liked some of the idea, but some of it he changed. The story involved a shadowy organisation called The Network, and Kelly initially came out with an idea that The Network might be responsible for the rise in conspiracy theories because they thought it would be the best way to hide an actual conspiracy. Kelly said he does not believe in conspiracy theories, but is fascinated by them. The series took about two years to come to fruition.

Prior to receiving the commission from Channel 4, the show was being developed at Sky, where it was intended to connect with another series. As Dennis Kelly recalls, the sister show – which was in development at the same time – followed the 1960s and 1970s hippie scene. The two were intended to share some limited continuity, but be made by different showrunners and production companies. Sky ultimately declined to commission either series.

Munden modelled the tone of Utopia on the early films of Roman Polanski, specifically Cul-de-sac.

=== Post-production ===
To emulate the graphic novel printing process, Munden chose to use a Technicolor palette: "The three-strip Technicolor process we use is comprised of the opposite colours – yellows, cyan, magentas. I was interested in Doris Day films from the 1950s that pushed those distinct elements." Colourist Aidan Farrell used grading software Nucoda Film Master to paint bolder colours into the shots. By the second series the production crew were preparing the film sets for grading.

Despite taking up just one line in the pilot script, director Marc Munden has described Lee's distinctive yellow bag as “a sort of jumping off point for the rest of the colour palette” for the show. The colour yellow went on to feature extensively in the promotional campaign for the first series.

For Utopia's soundtrack, Munden and composer Cristobal Tapia de Veer took inspiration from film composers such as Krzysztof Komeda and Eric Rogers, and the electronic music of Delia Derbyshire and Stock, Hausen & Walkman. Tapia de Veer heavily used field recordings to create the show's electronic soundtrack. These varied recordings included the sounds of rhino excrement, a Chilean trutruca, and the voice of director Alex García López. According to Tapia de Veer, "it was more about catching spirits on tape than organizing notes; an approach that helped articulate the mad complexity of Utopia's characters and abstract yet emotional situations." Tapia de Veer has said that the human voice appeals to him because of its range, explaining "it can be extremely creepy, or very moving".

Tapia de Veer said in an interview with the Royal Television Society that Utopia first resonated with him in part because of his time growing up in Pinochet's Chile. Living under dictatorship imbued him with a dark sense of humour, similar to the one he recognised in Utopia.

=== Filming locations ===
Utopia is set in London, but was filmed mostly in Merseyside and Yorkshire between April and October 2012, while the panning shot of the Mercury Hotel in the first episode was filmed in Westhoughton. Producer Bekki Wray-Rogers claimed the reason for this was that no other area in the UK could have provided them with such a variety of locations. Some scenes, such as the office of Conran Letts, were filmed at Scarisbrick Hall near Ormskirk. Scenes for the school shooting in episode 3 were filmed at Alsop High School in Walton whilst the school was closed for summer in July 2012. The empty red sandstone stately home the group make use of from episode 4 is filmed at Woolton Hall. The café scene in the fifth episode is filmed at TC's Cafe & Take-Away on Southport New Road near the village of Mere Brow. Many scenes were filmed in Crosby and Skelmersdale. Scenes set in the office of a fictional newspaper were shot in the offices of the Liverpool Echo newspaper on Old Hall Street in Liverpool. The final scene of the first series, with Jessica and Milner, was shot atop the Cunard Building, one of Liverpool's "three graces".

In the second series, locations used included Barnsley Interchange in Barnsley, Temple Works in Leeds, The Chocolate Works in York, the Yorkshire Dales National Park, the Hepworth Gallery in Wakefield, and various spots in Leeds city centre, which doubled as London by superimposing London landmarks on the horizon. The scene in which Mr Rabbit and Philip Carvel meet was filmed at Allerton Castle near Harrogate. The abandoned building in the second episode of series 2 was shot in the former Terry's Chocolate Factory in York.

=== Referencing real world events ===
The TV drama referenced a number of real world events, and incorporated these events into the story of the conspiracy. In the first series the school shooting bears resemblance to the Dunblane massacre. In the second series, the show used news footage from the 1970s including the assassinations of Aldo Moro, Carmine Pecorelli, Richard Sykes, and Airey Neave. The TWA Flight 841 disaster is also referenced in this episode. In particular, several events from a 10-day period in 1979, including the Three Mile Island accident and the collapse of the Labour government, had been combined as a jumping off point for the second series.

=== Cancellation ===
Utopia was cancelled by Channel Four on 12 August 2014. The network's official statement was:

Utopia is truly channel-defining: strikingly original, powered by Dennis Kelly's extraordinary voice and brought to life in all its technicolor glory through Marc Munden's undeniable creative flair and vision, the team at Kudos delivered a series which has achieved fervent cult status over two brilliantly warped and nail-biting series. It also has the honour of ensuring audiences will never look at a spoon in the same way again. It's always painful to say goodbye to shows we love, but it's a necessary part of being able to commission new drama, a raft of which are launching on the channel throughout 2015.

As well as receiving poor ratings, the planned HBO adaptation meant the British version never aired in America, according to director Marc Munden, preventing the show from gaining a larger audience. The viewers outside of the UK that did find Utopia tended to pirate it, according to Sam Donovan, who also directed a few episodes.

== Reception ==
The first series was generally well received by the critics, with some high praise for its striking visuals, but also some expressions of concern about its violence. Aidan Smith of The Scotsman noted both its "astonishing visuals" as well as its "astonishing violence", while Tom Sutcliffe of The Independent thought it a dystopian fantasy "delivered with great visual style" but was not convinced that its violence is necessary. Mark Monahan of The Daily Telegraph described it as "a dark, tantalizingly mysterious overture", while Sam Wollaston of The Guardian called it "a work of brilliant imagination", "a 21st-century nightmare" that "looks beautiful", but also wondered about the gratuitousness of its violence.

However, Utopia creator and writer Dennis Kelly defended the use of violence in his work, stating:

I think the Network, what they're trying to do, what Milner is trying to do, she believes in so much...The question is really simple and it's one that follows her through her life and the question is this: If I stop doing this, what's going to happen? What about the billions that live in the future?...The constant debate is about killing people, so I think you do need violence because you need the violence to tell the extreme of the story.

— Dennis Kelly, 'Utopia writer Dennis Kelly defends violent scenes',

After the outbreak of the COVID-19 pandemic, online conspiracy theorists drew parallels between the events of Utopia and the pandemic, believing COVID-19 to have been manufactured in a similar way to Utopia's Russian flu. Kelly has stringently denied that the events of Utopia mirror reality, asserting it to be a work of fiction. He also said that he is unsure if he would make the show today, given changes to the social climate that have helped normalise conspiracy theories.

== Controversy ==
UK media regulator Ofcom received 44 complaints about the television series including complaints about violence, offensive language and child actors being involved in scenes of adult content. Thirty-seven of the complaints related to a scene at the beginning of the third episode where a shooting takes place in a secondary school, a month after the Sandy Hook Elementary School shooting.

In the second series, the use of real life events including the assassination of Airey Neave prompted criticism of the show by a number of people, including members of the Neave family. In response, Channel 4 issued a statement and said that the drama series is "entirely fictional" and "it is not [Channel 4's] intention to cause offence and Utopia does not suggest that any other real organization was responsible for the death of Airey Neave."

== Awards and nominations ==
In 2014, the series was nominated for and won the International Emmy Award for best drama series.

Year	Award	Category	Recipient	Results	Ref.
2013	Royal Television Society Craft & Design Awards	Effects – Picture Enhancement	Aidan Farrell	Won	
2013	Royal Television Society Craft & Design Awards	Music – Original Score	Cristobal Tapia de Veer	Won	
2013	Royal Television Society Craft & Design Awards	Production Design – Drama	Kristian Milsted	Nominated	
2014	Royal Television Society Programme Awards	Drama Series	Utopia	Nominated	
2014	Royal Television Society Programme Awards	Writer – Drama	Dennis Kelly	Nominated	
2014	BAFTA TV Craft Awards	Writer – Drama	Dennis Kelly	Nominated	
2014	BAFTA TV Craft Awards	Photography And Lighting – Fiction	Ole Birkeland	Nominated	
2014	BAFTA TV Craft Awards	Director – Fiction	Marc Munden	Nominated	
2014	BAFTA TV Craft Awards	Digital Creativity	TH_NK	Nominated	
2014	International Emmy	Best Drama Series	Utopia	Won	
2014	Royal Television Society Craft & Design Awards	Costume Design – Drama	Marianne Agertoft	Nominated	
2014	Royal Television Society Craft & Design Awards	Effects – Picture Enhancement	Aidan Farrell	Nominated	
2014	Royal Television Society Craft & Design Awards	Music – Original Score	Cristobal Tapia de Veer	Nominated	
2014	Royal Television Society Craft & Design Awards	Production Design – Drama	Jennifer Kernke	Won	
2014	Royal Television Society Craft & Design Awards	Photography – Drama	Lol Crawley	Won	
2015	Royal Television Society Programme Awards	Best Actor – Male	Adeel Akhtar	Nominated	
2015	BAFTA TV Awards	Supporting Actor	Adeel Akhtar	Nominated	

== Release ==
=== DVD/Blu-ray ===
Series	Episodes	Original air dates		DVD/Blu-ray release dates and details		
Series	Episodes	Series premiere	Series finale	Region 2/B	Region 4	Special features
1	6	15 January 2013	19 February 2013	11 March 2013; DVD & Blu-ray	20 December 2013; DVD only	Audio commentary on episode one with Dennis Kelly (writer), Marc Munden (director) and Rebekah Wray-Rogers (producer); The World of Utopia – with writer Dennis Kelly; Fly on the Wall of director Marc Munden filming; Analysis of stunt scene with directors Wayne Yip & Alex García López; Deleted scenes
2	6	14 July 2014	12 August 2014	18 August 2014; Blu-ray in Germany only 26 June 2015	TBA	Deleted Scenes

=== Soundtrack ===
Utopia (Original Television Soundtrack)

Soundtrack album by Cristobal Tapia de Veer
- Released: 7 October 2013
- Label: Silva Screen Music

The series soundtrack was composed by Cristobal Tapia de Veer. The album entitled Utopia (Original Television Soundtrack) was released 7 October 2013, on both CD and MP3 download by Silva Screen Music. In August 2014 a contest was announced on Facebook to create a remix of the "Utopia Overture".

Cristobal Tapia De Veer announced via Twitter that the Series 2 soundtrack was coming 8 December. It was then released that day, and is now available on major music streaming services. It is also available for purchase as a CD/DVD, as well as on vinyl.

1. "Utopia Overture" (3:32)
2. "The Network" (3:21)
3. "Dislocated Thumbs (Pt. 1)" (2:17)
4. "Mr. Rabbit's Game" (1:05)
5. "Conspiracy (Pt. 1)" (2:53)
6. "Meditative Chaos" (3:10)
7. "A New Brand of Drug" (2:13)
8. "Samba De Wilson" (2:15)
9. "Slivovitz" (1:43)
10. "Bekki on Pills (Pt. 1)" (1:01)
11. "Where Is Jessica Hyde? (Pt. 1)" (3:39)
12. "Arby's Oratorio" (1:38)
13. "Jessica Gets Off" (3:18)
14. "Mr. Rabbit It Is" (2:51)
15. "Lovechild" (1:03)
16. "Mind Vortex" (2:48)
17. "Twat" (2:02)
18. "Bekki on Pills (Pt. 2)" (3:16)
19. "Fertility Control" (1:50)
20. "Janus Saves" (2:51)
21. "Evil Prevails" (2:55)
22. "Conspiracy (Pt. 2)" (4:56)
23. "Dislocated Thumbs (Pt. 2)" (1:28)
24. "Utopia Descent" (2:42)
25. "Where Is Jessica Hyde? (Pt. 2)" (4:08)
26. "Utopia's Death Cargo" (1:38)
27. "The Experiment" (6:16)
28. "Utopia Finale" (2:35)

== American adaptation ==
In February 2014, HBO ordered an American adaptation of Utopia, to be co-created and directed by David Fincher, with Gillian Flynn as the writer. Fincher planned to direct all episodes of the series, and said "I like the characters – I love Dennis's honesty and affinity for the nerds." In June 2015, it was announced that Rooney Mara was negotiating for the role of Jessica Hyde. On 30 July 2015, it was reported that the series would not go into production because of budget disputes between Fincher and HBO, and that the cast had been released from their contracts. After HBO lost rights to the project, Amazon ordered a nine-episode first season directly on 19 April 2018, with Flynn said to adapt the project from the original.

The American adaptation was released on Amazon Prime Video on 25 September 2020 and was created by Gillian Flynn.

== See also ==
- Antinatalism
- "Rat utopia"
- Konrad Lorenz
- Stand on Zanzibar
