= Assassination of Airey Neave =

1979 murder in City of Westminster, London

- Part of the Troubles
- Location: City of Westminster, London, England
- Date: 30 March 1979; 47 years ago 14:58 (UTC)
- Target: Airey Neave
- Attack type: Bombing
- Weapon: Booby trap bomb
- Deaths: 1 (Airey Neave)
- Perpetrator: Irish National Liberation Army

On 30 March 1979, Airey Neave, British Shadow Secretary of State for Northern Ireland, was assassinated by the Irish National Liberation Army with a bomb fixed under his car. The bomb detonated in the car park of the Palace of Westminster in London and mortally wounded Neave, who died shortly after being admitted to hospital.

== Background ==
The Irish National Liberation Army (INLA), and its political wing the Irish Republican Socialist Party, was formed at a meeting in a Dublin hotel in December 1974. In 1975 it began carrying out a paramilitary campaign in Northern Ireland on British Government facilities and officials with the strategic objective of removing Northern Ireland from the United Kingdom, using the front names of the "People's Liberation Army", and the "Armagh People's Republican Army".

Through the 1970s Neave, an influential Conservative Member of Parliament, had been advocating within British political circles for an abandonment of the British Government's strategy of a containment of Irish paramilitary violence in Northern Ireland against the British State, and for the adoption of strategy of waging a military offensive against it, seeking its martial defeat. This brought him to the attention of both the Provisional Irish Republican Army and the INLA as a potential threat to their organisations and activities. A member of INLA's leadership later stated:

He (Neave) was coming in on the heels of Mason to settle the Northern problem, and made Mason look like a lamb. He wanted to bring in more Special Air Service, and take the war to the enemy.

Following the Labour Government's defeat in the House of Commons on a vote of no confidence on 28 March 1979, a general election was called in the United Kingdom, and with the Conservatives expected to win the election, Neave, as the party's Shadow Secretary of State for Northern Ireland, was set to become the new Secretary of State for Northern Ireland, which would place him in a position of governmental executive authority to bring his military strategy for the province into fruition.

== Assassination ==
On Friday 30 March 1979 two INLA paramilitaries gained entry to the House of Commons' underground car park posing as workmen, carrying the bomb in a tool box. Once inside they identified Neave's car, and fixed a 16-ounce (450 g) explosive device with a mercury tilt detonator on to the floor panel under the driver's seat.

Neave left the House of Commons a few minutes before 3 p.m. As he drove up the underground car park's exit ramp, the angle tilted the bomb's mercury switch, triggering it. The explosion knocked Neave unconscious, severed his legs and trapped him in the mangled wreckage of the vehicle. Neave was cut free from the wreckage by the emergency services, and rushed to Westminster Hospital by ambulance, dying there a few minutes after arrival, not having regained consciousness.

== Reactions ==
The INLA issued a statement regarding the attack in the August 1979 edition of its publication The Starry Plough:

In March, retired terrorist and supporter of capital punishment, Airey Neave, got a taste of his own medicine when an INLA unit pulled off the operation of the decade and blew him to bits inside the 'impregnable' Palace of Westminster. Margaret Thatcher said on television that he was an 'incalculable loss' – and so he was – to the British ruling class.

Margaret Thatcher was due to broadcast to the nation that evening, but cancelled her plans due to her grief at Neave's death. The House of Commons decided to resume its business less than an hour after the tragedy, with Labour Chief Whip Michael Cocks and Conservative Norman St John-Stevas taking the view that "legislation should not be baulked by murdering thugs."

Neave's death came just two days after the vote of no confidence which brought down Callaghan's government and a month before the general election, which saw a Conservative victory and Thatcher come to power as Prime Minister. Neave's wife Diana, whom he married on 29 December 1942, was subsequently elevated to the House of Lords as Baroness Airey of Abingdon.

Neave's biographer Paul Routledge met a member of the Irish Republican Socialist Party (the political wing of INLA) who was involved in the killing of Neave and who told Routledge that Neave "would have been very successful at that job [Northern Ireland Secretary]. He would have brought the armed struggle to its knees".

As a result of Neave's assassination the INLA was declared illegal across the whole of the United Kingdom on 2 July 1979.

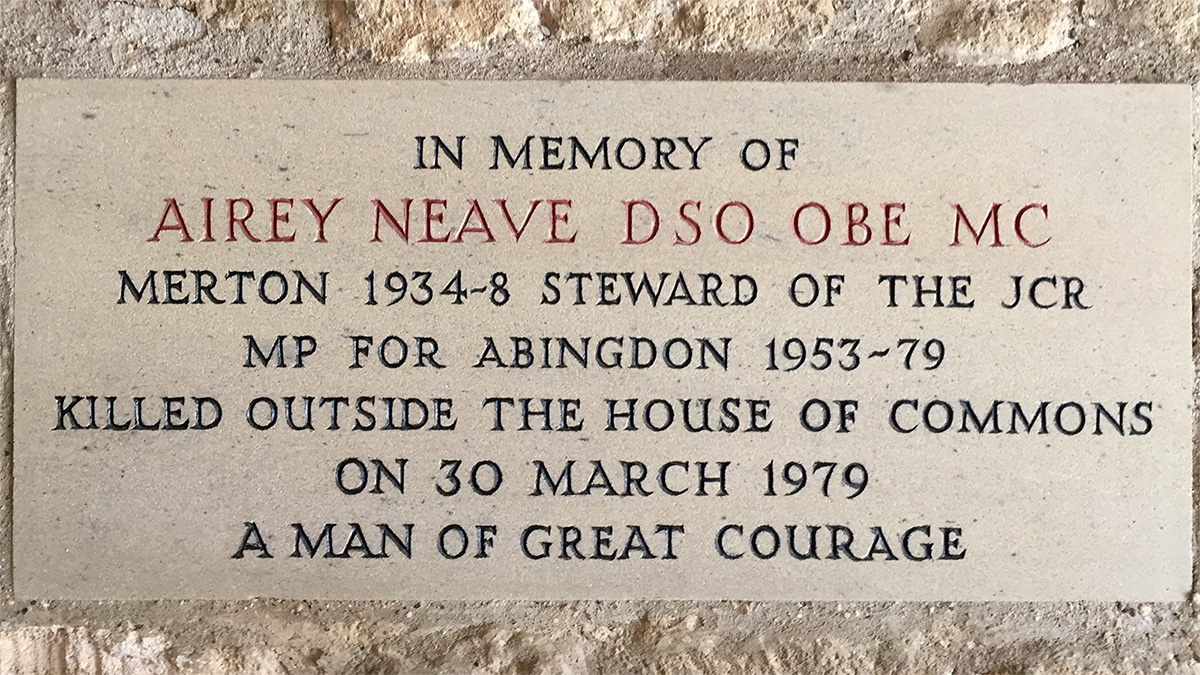
Memorial plaque to Airey Neave at his alma mater, Merton College, Oxford

Neave's body was buried in the graveyard of St. Margaret's Church at Hinton Waldrist in Oxfordshire.

== See also ==
- Brighton bombing
- Downing Street mortar attack
- List of attacks on legislatures
- List of British MPs killed in office

== Sources ==
- Jack Holland, Henry McDonald, INLA – Deadly Divisions'
- The Lost Revolution: The Story of the Official IRA and the Workers' Party, Brian Hanley and Scott Millar, ISBN 1-84488-120-2
- CAIN project
- Coogan, Tim Pat, The IRA, Fontana Books, ISBN 0-00-636943-X
- The Starry Plough – IRSP newspaper
