= List of British MPs killed in office =

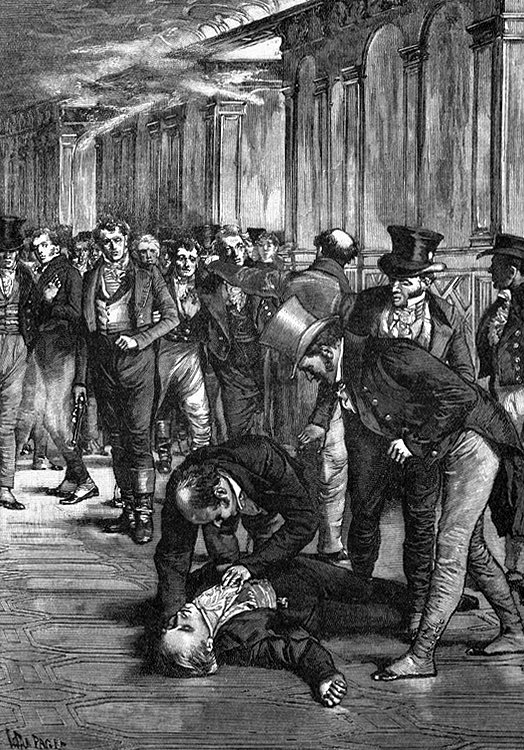
Assassination of Spencer Perceval in 1812. Perceval is the only British prime minister to be assassinated.

This is a list of sitting members of the House of Commons of the United Kingdom (MPs) who died by assassination or other culpable homicide.

Spencer Perceval is the only British prime minister to have been assassinated, having been shot on 11 May 1812 by John Bellingham, a merchant who blamed the government for his debt. From 1882 to 1990, six MPs were assassinated by Irish nationalists. The murder of Jo Cox on 16 June 2016 was committed by a white supremacist; Cox was both the first female and the first Labour MP to be assassinated. The latest incident, the murder of Sir David Amess on 15 October 2021, was committed by an Islamist terrorist.

== List ==
Date	Victim	Party	Constituency	Assassin(s)	Motive	Notes
11 May 1812	Spencer Perceval	Tory	Northampton	John Bellingham	Legal redress Insanity	Main article: Assassination of Spencer Perceval The only serving Prime Minister of the United Kingdom to be assassinated, who was shot dead in the lobby of the House of Commons.
6 May 1882	Lord Frederick Cavendish	Liberal	Northern West Riding of Yorkshire	James Carey and others (members of the Irish National Invincibles)	Irish republicanism	Main article: Phoenix Park Murders The new Chief Secretary for Ireland had arrived that day in Dublin and was walking in the Phoenix Park from the Chief Secretary's Lodge to the Vice-Regal Lodge with T. H. Burke, the Under-Secretary for Ireland, when both were stabbed to death.
22 June 1922	Sir Henry Wilson	Ulster Unionist	North Down	Reginald Dunne and Joseph O'Sullivan (members of the Irish Republican Army)	Irish republicanism	Former distinguished British Army field marshal and Chief of the Imperial General Staff during World War I and advisor to the government of Northern Ireland. Shot outside his home in Eaton Square, London.
30 March 1979	Airey Neave	Conservative	Abingdon	Members of the Irish National Liberation Army	Irish republicanism	Main article: Assassination of Airey Neave The Shadow Secretary of State for Northern Ireland; killed in a car bombing outside the Palace of Westminster.
14 November 1981	Robert Bradford	Ulster Unionist	Belfast South	Members of the Provisional IRA	Irish republicanism	Shot at a constituents' surgery in Finaghy, Belfast.
12 October 1984	Sir Anthony Berry	Conservative	Enfield Southgate	Patrick Magee of the Provisional IRA	Irish republicanism	Main article: Brighton hotel bombing Killed in the bombing of the Grand Brighton Hotel during the Conservative Party Conference.
30 July 1990	Ian Gow	Conservative	Eastbourne	Members of the Provisional IRA	Irish republicanism	Killed by a car bomb near his home in East Sussex.
16 June 2016	Jo Cox	Labour	Batley and Spen	Thomas Mair	Neo-Nazi white supremacism	Main article: Murder of Jo Cox Shot and stabbed before a constituents' surgery in Birstall, West Yorkshire.
15 October 2021	Sir David Amess	Conservative	Southend West	Ali Harbi Ali	Jihadism (Islamist extremism)	Main article: Murder of David Amess Stabbed multiple times after arrival at a constituency surgery meeting in Leigh-on-Sea, Essex.

== See also ==
- Records of members of parliament of the United Kingdom
