= Thomas Benyon =

British activist and politician

Thomas Yates Benyon, OBE (born 13 August 1942, Newmarket, West Suffolk) is a British activist and former Conservative Party politician.

== Early life ==
Benyon was educated at Wellington School, Somerset from 1956 to 1960.

== Parliamentary career ==
Benyon twice stood unsuccessfully for Parliament in Labour-held seats. In February 1974 he contested Huyton in Merseyside against the former (and future) Prime Minister, Harold Wilson. In the following election in October that year, he contested Wood Green in London but was again beaten, this time by the Labour incumbent Joyce Butler.

Following the murder of Airey Neave just before the 1979 general election, Benyon became the new candidate to be Member of Parliament (MP) for the Conservative stronghold of Abingdon, which he won with ease. However, in 1983, the seat was abolished in boundary changes, and Benyon did not stand for the Oxford West and Abingdon or Wantage seats that replaced it. He has not stood for Parliament since.

== Other work ==
He was on the governing body of Abingdon School from 1979 to 1983.

In 2002, Tom and Olivia Jane Benyon, with James Pringle, Sue Gibbs, Clare Hayns, James Maberly and the Rev David Streater, founded a charity called ZANE. It was spearheaded by Tom Benyon after he met Cathy Olds whose husband Martin was hacked to death in Zimbabwe the previous year, in 2001, when their farm was occupied by Robert Mugabe loyalists.

In 2005 he was elected for a five-year term, as a lay representative of the Diocese of Oxford, to the General Synod of the Church of England. He remains an active member of the Church. he has a family of 4 children.

== Honours ==
Benyon was appointed OBE in recognition of his "services to vulnerable people in Zimbabwe".

Parliament of the United Kingdom
Preceded by Airey Neave	Member of Parliament for Abingdon; 1979–1983	Constituency abolished
