= Hinton Waldrist =

Village in Oxfordshire, England

Coordinates: 51.689°N 1.458°W

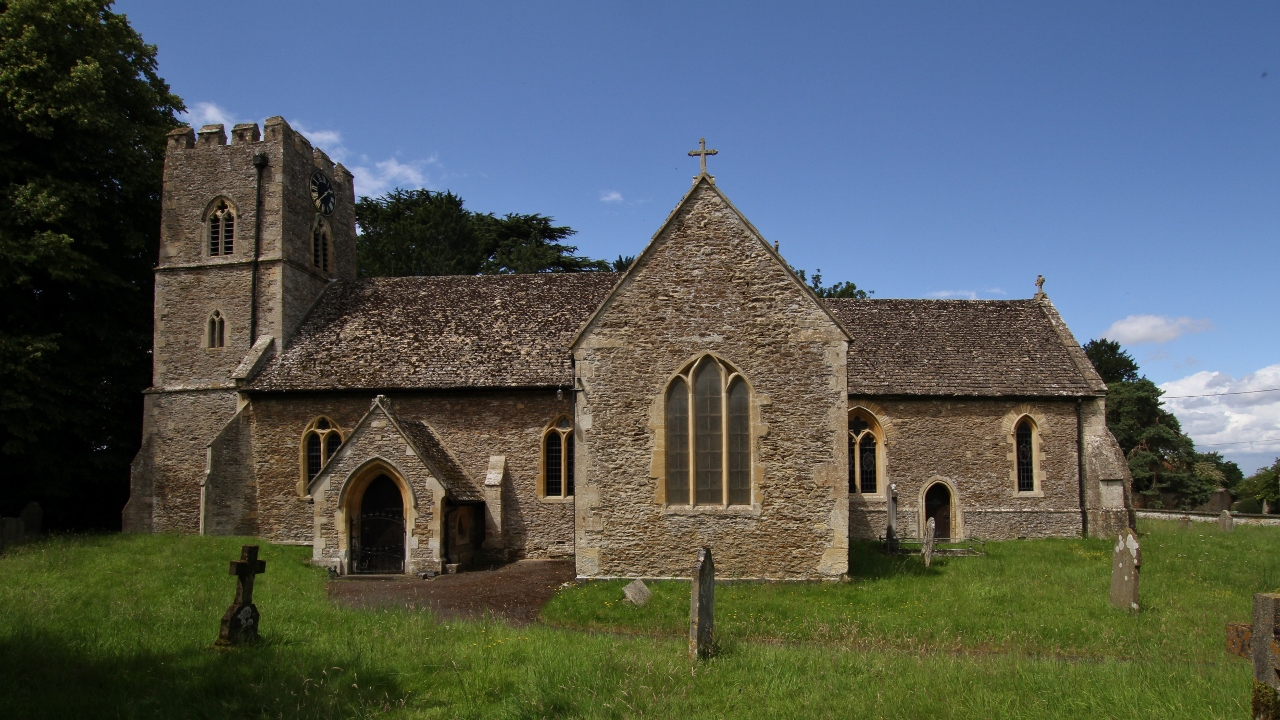
- St Margaret of Antioch parish church

- Location within Oxfordshire
- Population: 328 (2011 Census)
- OS grid reference: SU3799
- Civil parish: Hinton Waldrist
- District: Vale of White Horse
- Shire county: Oxfordshire
- Region: South East
- Country: England
- Sovereign state: United Kingdom
- Post town: Faringdon
- Postcode district: SN7
- Dialling code: 01865
- Police: Thames Valley
- Fire: Oxfordshire
- Ambulance: South Central
- UK Parliament: Witney
- Website: Hinton Waldrist on the Web

Hinton Waldrist is a village and civil parish in the Vale of White Horse, England. It was part of Berkshire until the 1974 boundary changes transferred it to Oxfordshire. The village is between Oxford and Faringdon, 9 miles (14 km) southwest of Oxford. The parish includes the hamlet of Duxford. The 2011 Census recorded the parish's population as 328.

== Manor ==
In 1086 the Domesday Book recorded the village as Hentone, Old English for "high farmstead". In the 12th century the manor passed to the St. Valery family, from whom the village took the second part of its name. In 1332 the manor was acquired by William de Bohun, 1st Earl of Northampton, whose granddaughter Mary de Bohun became the first wife of Henry IV. The manor was subsequently held by John Ramsay, 1st Earl of Holderness, Sir Henry Marten and the Loder family.

The oldest part of Hinton Manor House is a late 16th-century Elizabethan building. About 1700 John Loder had it refronted and a new block added to the rear. Additions to the house, including an orangery and a Gothic revival-style wing, were built about 1830. An extra storey was added to one wing about 1860. The house is a Grade II* listed building.

== Castle ==
The earthworks of a former 11th century motte-and-bailey castle are southwest of the moated manor house.

== Parish church ==
The Church of England parish church of St Margaret is mid-13th-century. It is cruciform, completed in the late 13th century by the addition of the south transept. Several of the windows and their stained glass are 19th-century. Inside the church are several monuments to members of the Loder family, and one commemorating Airey Neave, who lived in the village is buried in the churchyard. The church is a Grade II* listed building.

The west tower is Decorated Gothic and has a ring of six bells. Abraham I Rudhall of Gloucester cast the second, third and fourth bells in 1709. William Taylor of Loughborough cast the fifth bell in 1843, presumably at the foundry he had at that time in Oxford. Mears and Stainbank of the Whitechapel Bell Foundry cast the tenor bell in 1868. John Taylor & Co of Loughborough cast the treble bell in 1928.

St Margaret's parish is part of the Benefice of Cherbury with Gainfield.

The oldest part of the Old Rectory is the rear wing, which is 14th-century. It has three crucks and was built as a hall house. The central part of the house was added in the 17th century, and the front was added about 1840. It is a Grade II* listed building. It is no longer a clergy residence.

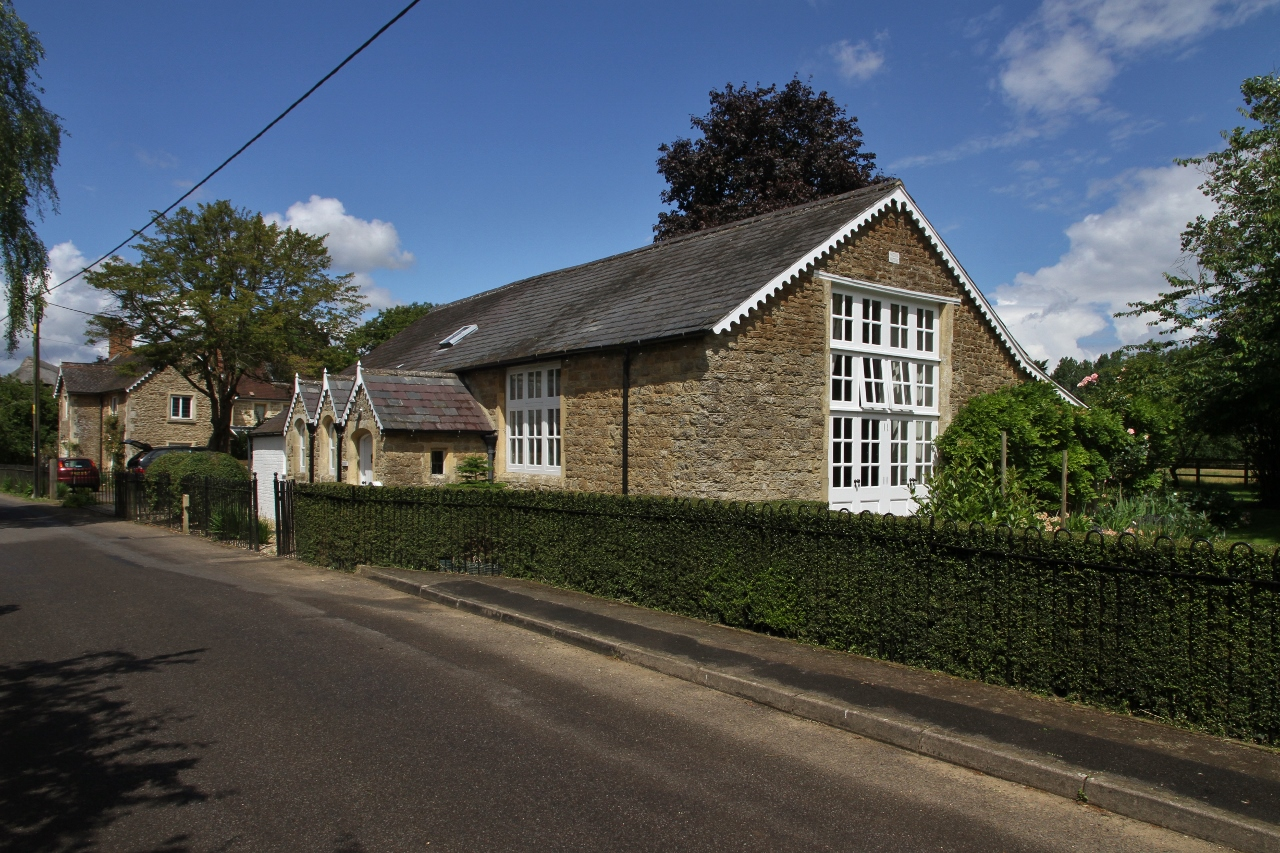
Former parish school in Hinton Waldrist

== School ==
The parish school was built in 1850. By 1924 it was an elementary school. It has since been closed and the building converted into a private house.

== Amenities ==
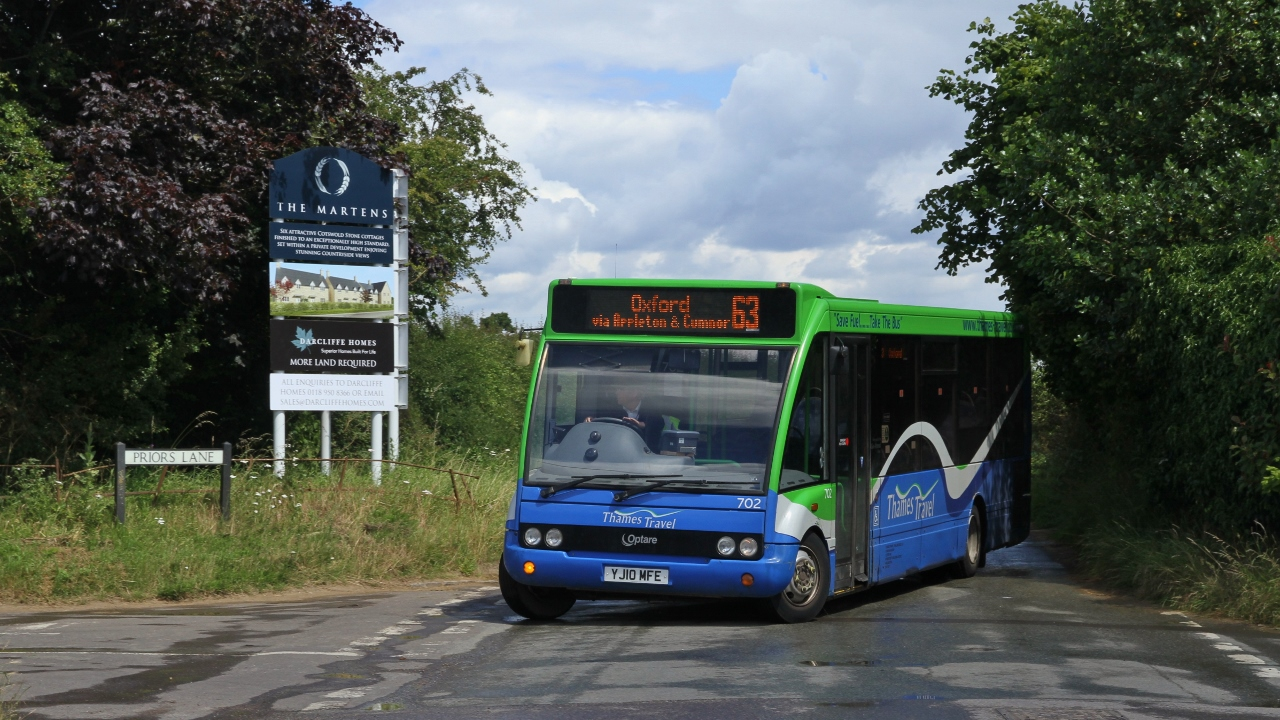
A Thames Travel bus on route 63 arriving in Hinton Waldrist

There is a farm shop at Laggots Farm on the High Street.

Oxfordshire County Council subsidised bus route 63 between Oxford and Southmoor serves Hinton Waldrist on weekdays. From Monday to Friday there are five departures a day from Hinton Waldrist to Oxford, and two buses a day from Oxford to Hinton Waldrist. There is no service on Saturday, Sunday, or Bank Holidays. The current contractor operating the route is Thames Travel.

== Notable people ==
- Airey Neave MP (1916–79), buried in the churchyard
- Diana Neave, Baroness Airey of Abingdon (1919–92), buried in the churchyard

== Scenes in our Village ==
Hinton Waldrist is the subject of 62 stereoscopic images produced by the Victorian photographer T.R. Williams in 1856. The series of photographs is the subject of a book entitled A Village Lost and Found, co-authored by Queen guitarist Brian May.

== Sources ==
- May, Brian; Vidal, E (2009). A Village Lost and Found: Scenes in Our Village by T. R. Williams. An Annotated Tour of the Celebrated 1850s Stereo Card Series. Frances Lincoln.
- Mills, AD; Room, Adrian (2003). A Dictionary of British Place-Names. Oxford: Oxford University Press. ISBN 0-19-852758-6.
- Page, William; Ditchfield, PH, eds. (1924). A History of the County of Berkshire. Victoria County History. Vol. IV. assisted by John Hautenville Cope. London: The St Katherine Press. pp. 463–466.
- Pevsner, Nikolaus (1966). Berkshire. The Buildings of England. Harmondsworth: Penguin Books. p. 155.
