= Paul Routledge =

British journalist

Paul Routledge (/ˈraʊtlɛdʒ/ ROWT-lej; born 11 December 1943) is an English political journalist. As of 2023, he writes for the Daily Mirror, and is considered to have an 'Old Labour' outlook.

== Biography ==
Born in Yorkshire, he is the son of a railway clerk, although most of his male relatives were miners. After an education at Normanton Grammar School and Nottingham University, where he read English, Routledge began his career in journalism on graduation. By 1969, he was working for The Times on the Labour relations desk, later becoming Labour editor. Following a brief period in Singapore, he joined The Observer (in 1986) shortly after the Wapping dispute. When The Guardian took over that newspaper, he left for The Independent on Sunday.

In 1985, Routledge was the subject of much controversy in the British media after he engaged in a discussion on the miners' strike with Queen Elizabeth II, which is against convention of Royal visits. After being denounced by much of the tabloid press, he was forced to apologise for this by The Times, but later said that his apology was inaccurate. In the introduction to his biography of Arthur Scargill, Routledge states that he had missed the briefing on how to behave during the visit, as he was originally due to miss the event to cover an NUM meeting in Sheffield. He gives an account of the conversation of 28 February 1985:

The Queen volunteered that she had been down a coal mine in Scotland, which had closed not long after. Innocently, I asked what her feelings about the strike were. She thought it "very sad", and after a pause added "It's all about one man, isn't it?" – or words to very similar effect. I wasn't taking notes, nor was anyone else. Evidently, it was not done. I offered the view that perhaps it wasn't about one man: knowing the miners, having been brought up among them, I thought that one man couldn't bring out 100,000 men for a whole year. There was a pregnant pause, and the royal party moved on. The exchange had taken thirty seconds at most.

He has written biographies of Gordon Brown, Peter Mandelson, Arthur Scargill and Airey Neave.

== Personal life ==
Paul married Lynne Margaret Sowter on 9 April 1963. They welcomed their first great-granddaughter following the birth of a granddaughter to his second daughter.
