= Diana Neave, Baroness Airey of Abingdon =

Conservative member of the House of Lords

Diana Josceline Barbara Neave, Baroness Airey of Abingdon (born Diana Josceline Barbara Giffard; 7 July 1919 – 27 November 1992) was a Conservative member of the House of Lords after receiving a life peerage in August 1979.

== Personal life ==
Diana Giffard was daughter of Thomas Arthur Walter Giffard, MBE, DL, for Staffordshire, of Chillington Hall, Wolverhampton, Staffordshire and his wife Angela Erskine Trollope, elder daughter and co-heiress of Sir William Henry Trollope, 10th Bt.

She married Airey Neave, elder son and first child of Sheffield Airey Neave. They had three children:

1. Hon. Marigold Elizabeth Cassandra Neave, now Hon. Mrs Webb (born 5 May 1944); married 8 June 1968 William Richard Broughton Webb, son of Lt.-Cdr. William Frank Broughton Webb, and has issue, one son and one daughter.
2. Hon. Richard Patrick Sheffield Neave (born 12 November 1947); married 1980 Elizabeth Mary Catherine Riddell, daughter of Cuthbert Edward Alphonso Riddell, and had issue, three sons, whose common second last name is Airey.
3. Hon. William Robert Sheffield Neave (born 13 August 1953); married 1986 Joanna Mary Stuart Paton, daughter of James Stuart Paton, and has issue, two sons, Richard Digby Stuart Neave (born 21 May 1987); Sebastian Airey Stuart Neave (born 11 May 1989).

== Career ==
At the beginning of the Second World War she worked as a nurse in an RAF hospital. Later she was enrolled by the Foreign Office to carry out work in secret intelligence with the Political Warfare Executive, in particular liaising with the Polish Ministry of Information. Diana Neave was created Baroness Airey of Abingdon, of Abingdon in the County of Oxford, on 6 August 1979, a few months after her husband – a British Conservative Member of Parliament – was killed in an attack by the Irish National Liberation Army using a car-bomb in the Palace of Westminster on 30 March 1979. She was on the governing body of Abingdon School from 1981 to 1987.

She was a trustee of the Imperial War Museum, the National Heritage Memorial Fund, the Dorneywood Trust and the Stansted Park Foundation. She was President of the Anglo-Polish Conservative Society.

== Death ==
She died in 1992 and is buried in the churchyard with her husband at Hinton Waldrist.

== Arms ==
Coat of arms of Diana Neave, Baroness Airey of Abingdon

Coronet
A coronet of a Baroness
Escutcheon
Quarterly: 1st and 4th, Argent on a Cross Sable five Fleurs-de-lys Or and on a Canton Azure a Lion rampant Or gorge with a Mural Crown Gules (Neave/Airey); 2nd and 3rd, Azure three Stirrups with Leathers two and one Or (Giffard)
Supporters
On either side a Panther rampant and in trian aspect Or spotted of various colours and breathing Flames proper gorged with a Coronet of a Baroness proper and standing on a Grassy Mount growing therefrom a Branch of two Roses Gules barbed and seeded slipped and leaved and two Thistles all proper
Motto
Sola Proba Quae Honesta
