= Airey Neave =

British politician, military officer and lawyer (1916–1979)

Lieutenant Colonel Airey Neave DSO OBE MC TD
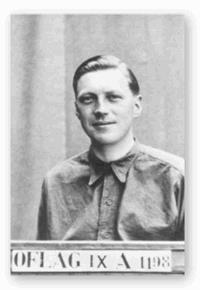
- Neave between May 1940 and May 1941

Shadow Secretary of State for Northern Ireland
- In office 4 March 1974 – 30 March 1979
- Leader: Edward Heath; Margaret Thatcher
- Preceded by: Francis Pym
- Succeeded by: Alec Jones

Parliamentary Under-Secretary of State for Air
- In office 16 January 1959 – 16 October 1959
- Prime Minister: Harold Macmillan
- Preceded by: Ian Orr-Ewing
- Succeeded by: William Taylor

Parliamentary Secretary to the Ministry of Transport
- In office 18 January 1957 – 16 January 1959
- Prime Minister: Harold Macmillan
- Preceded by: Hugh Molson
- Succeeded by: John Hay

Member of Parliament for Abingdon
- In office 30 June 1953 – 30 March 1979
- Preceded by: Sir Ralph Glyn
- Succeeded by: Thomas Benyon

Personal details
- Born: Airey Middleton Sheffield Neave; 23 January 1916 Knightsbridge, London, England
- Died: 30 March 1979 (aged 63) Westminster, London, England
- Cause of death: Assassination (car bomb attack)
- Party: Conservative
- Spouse: Diana Giffard (m. 1942)
- Children: 3
- Parent(s): Sheffield Airey Neave (father); Dorothy Middleton
- Education: Merton College, Oxford
- Occupation: Politician; Soldier
- Profession: Barrister

Military service
- Allegiance: British Empire
- Branch/service: British Army
- Years of service: 1935–1951
- Rank: Lieutenant colonel
- Unit: Royal Artillery
- Battles/wars: Second World War; Battle of France; Siege of Calais (POW)

Lieutenant Colonel Airey Middleton Sheffield Neave (/ˈɛəri ˈniːv/; 23 January 1916 – 30 March 1979) was a British soldier, lawyer and Member of Parliament (MP) from 1953 until his assassination in 1979.

During the Second World War, Neave was the first British prisoner-of-war to succeed in escaping from Oflag IV-C at Colditz Castle. On his return to England he worked with MI9 (Room 900) assisting escape and evasion lines in occupied Europe to help downed airmen evade German capture and return to Britain. The escape lines helped about 7,000 British and American airmen and soldiers escape occupied Europe. After the war he served with the International Military Tribunal at the Nuremberg trials. He later became Conservative MP for Abingdon.

Neave was assassinated in a car bomb attack at the House of Commons; the Irish National Liberation Army claimed responsibility.

== Early life ==
Neave was born on 23 January 1916, the son of Sheffield Airey Neave CMG, OBE (1879–1961), an entomologist, who lived at Ingatestone, Essex, and his wife Dorothy, the daughter of Arthur Thomson Middleton. His father was the grandson of Sheffield Neave, the third son of Sir Thomas Neave, 2nd Baronet.

The family came to prominence as merchants in the West Indies during the 18th century and were raised to the baronetage during the life of Richard Neave, Governor of the Bank of England. Neave spent his early years in Knightsbridge in London, before he moved to Beaconsfield. Neave was sent to St. Ronan's School, Worthing, and from there, in 1929, he went to Eton College. He went on to read Jurisprudence at Merton College, Oxford.

While at Eton, Neave composed a prize-winning essay in 1933 that examined the likely consequences of Adolf Hitler's rise to supreme power in Germany, and Neave predicted then that another widespread war would break out in Europe in the near future. Neave had earlier been on a visit to Germany, and he witnessed the Nazi German methods of grasping political and military power. At Eton, Neave served in the school cadet corps as a cadet lance corporal, and received a territorial commission as a second lieutenant in the Oxfordshire and Buckinghamshire Light Infantry on 11 December 1935.

When Neave went to Oxford University, he purchased and read the entire written works of the general and military theorist Carl von Clausewitz. When Neave was asked why, he answered: "since war [is] coming, it [is] only sensible to learn as much as possible about the art of waging it". During 1938, Neave completed his third-class degree. By his own admission, while at Oxford University, he did only the minimum amount of academic work that was required of him by his tutors.

== Second World War ==
Neave transferred his territorial commission to the Royal Engineers on 2 May 1938 and, following the outbreak of war, he was mobilised. Sent to France in February 1940 with 1st Searchlight Regiment, Royal Artillery, he was wounded and captured by the Germans at Calais on 23 May 1940. He was imprisoned at Oflag IX-A/H near Spangenberg and, in February 1941, was moved to Stalag XX-A near Thorn in German-occupied western Poland. Meanwhile, Neave's commission was transferred to the Royal Artillery on 1 August 1940.

In April 1941, he escaped from Thorn along with Norman Forbes. They were captured near Ilow while trying to enter Soviet-controlled Poland and were briefly held by the Gestapo. In May, they were both sent to Oflag IV-C (often referred to as Colditz Castle because of its location).

While in Colditz, the French military prisoners asked the Germans to have the Jewish military prisoners separated from non-Jewish French military prisoners, which resulted in about 80 French Jewish military prisoners being confined in a crowded attic of the castle. Neave and many British officers were appalled at the French prisoners' request. In a demonstration of their solidarity with the French Jews, the British invited the French Jews to dinner in the British mess, where Neave made a speech denouncing the prejudice.

Neave made his first attempt to escape from Colditz on 28 August 1941, disguised as a German NCO. He did not get out of the castle as his hastily contrived German uniform (made from a Polish army tunic and with a cap painted with scenery paint, accompanied with cardboard belt painted silver) was rendered bright green under the prison searchlights. The disguise was so poor that guards came to see it; prison official Paul Priem joked that "Corporal Neave is to be sent to the Russian front".

Together with Dutch officer Anthony Luteyn, he made a second attempt on 5 January 1942, again in disguise. Better uniforms and escape route (they made a quick exit from a theatrical production using the trapdoor beneath the stage) got them out of the prison; by train and on foot, they travelled to Leipzig and Ulm and finally reached the border with Switzerland near Singen. Via France, Spain, and Gibraltar, Neave returned to England in April 1942. Neave was the first British officer to escape from Colditz Castle.

On 12 May 1942, shortly after his return to England, he was decorated with the Military Cross. He was subsequently promoted to war substantive captain and to the permanent rank of captain on 11 April 1945.

A temporary major at war's end, he was appointed an MBE (Military Division) on 30 August 1945, and awarded the DSO on 18 October. Consequently, the earlier MBE appointment was cancelled on 25 October 1945.

After his escape from the Germans and return to England, Neave was recruited as an intelligence officer for MI9, supporting underground escape organisations, such as the Pat O'Leary Line and the Comet Line in occupied Europe, with equipment, agents, and money. They were assisting downed Allied airmen and other Allied military personnel to evade and escape capture by the Germans. In Western Europe, about five thousand British and American military personnel were rescued by the escape organisations and repatriated to the United Kingdom, before D-Day, mostly through neutral Spain. After D-Day, in Operation Marathon, Neave journeyed to France and Belgium and, with help from the Comet Line and the Resistance, rescued more than three hundred Allied airmen who had taken refuge in forest camps after being shot down. While at MI9, he was the immediate superior of the future comedian Michael Bentine, also an Old Etonian.

Neave also served in the International Military Tribunal at the Nuremberg trials, investigating Krupp. He was supported by the work of his secretary Joan Tutte. As a well-known war hero – as well as a qualified lawyer who spoke fluent German – he was honoured with the role of reading the indictments to the Nazi leaders on trial. He wrote several books about his war experiences, including an account of the trials.

A temporary lieutenant-colonel by 1947, he was appointed an OBE (Military Division) in that year's Birthday Honours. He was awarded the Bronze Star by the US government on 20 July 1948, and was promoted to lieutenant-colonel on 1 April 1950, At the same time, his promotion to acting major was gazetted, with retroactive effect from 16 April 1948. He entered the reserves on 21 September 1951.

== Political career ==
Neave stood for the Conservative Party at the 1950 election in Thurrock and at Ealing North in 1951. He was elected for Abingdon in a by-election in June 1953, but his career was held back by a heart attack he suffered in 1959.

He was a Governor of Imperial College between 1963 and 1971 and was a member of the House of Commons select committee on Science and Technology between 1965 and 1970. He was on the governing body of Abingdon School from 1953 to 1979.

Edward Heath, when Chief Whip, was alleged to have told Neave that after he suffered his heart attack, his career was finished, but in his 1998 autobiography, Heath strongly denied ever making such a remark. He admitted that in December 1974 Neave had told him to stand down for the good of the party. During the final two months of 1974, Neave had asked Keith Joseph, William Whitelaw and Edward du Cann to stand against Heath, and said that in the case of any of them challenging for the party leadership, he would be their campaign manager. When all three refused to stand, Neave agreed to be the campaign manager for Margaret Thatcher's attempt to become leader of the Conservative Party, which was eventually successful.

When Thatcher was elected leader in February 1975, Neave was rewarded by becoming head of her private office. He was then appointed Shadow Secretary of State for Northern Ireland and, at the time of his death, was poised to attain the equivalent Cabinet position in the event of the Conservatives winning the general election of 1979. In opposition, Neave was a strong supporter of Roy Mason, who had extended the policy of Ulsterisation.

Neave was author of the new and radical Conservative policy of abandoning devolution in Northern Ireland if there was no early progress in that regard, and concentrating on local government reform instead. This integrationist policy was hastily abandoned by Humphrey Atkins, who became Secretary of State for Northern Ireland, the role Neave had shadowed.

Politician Tony Benn records in his diary (17 February 1981) that a journalist from the New Statesman, Duncan Campbell, told him that he had received information two years previously, from an intelligence agent, that Neave had planned to have Benn assassinated if, following the election of a Labour government, Labour leader James Callaghan resigned and there was a possibility that Benn might be elected in his place. Campbell said that the agent was ready to give his name and the New Statesman was going to print the story. Benn, however, discounted the validity of the story, writing in his diary: "No one will believe for a moment that Airey Neave would have done such a thing." The magazine printed the story on 20 February 1981, naming the agent as Lee Tracey. Tracey said he had met Neave, who asked him to join a team of intelligence and security specialists which would "make sure Benn was stopped". A planned second meeting never took place because Neave was murdered with a car bomb.

== Assassination ==
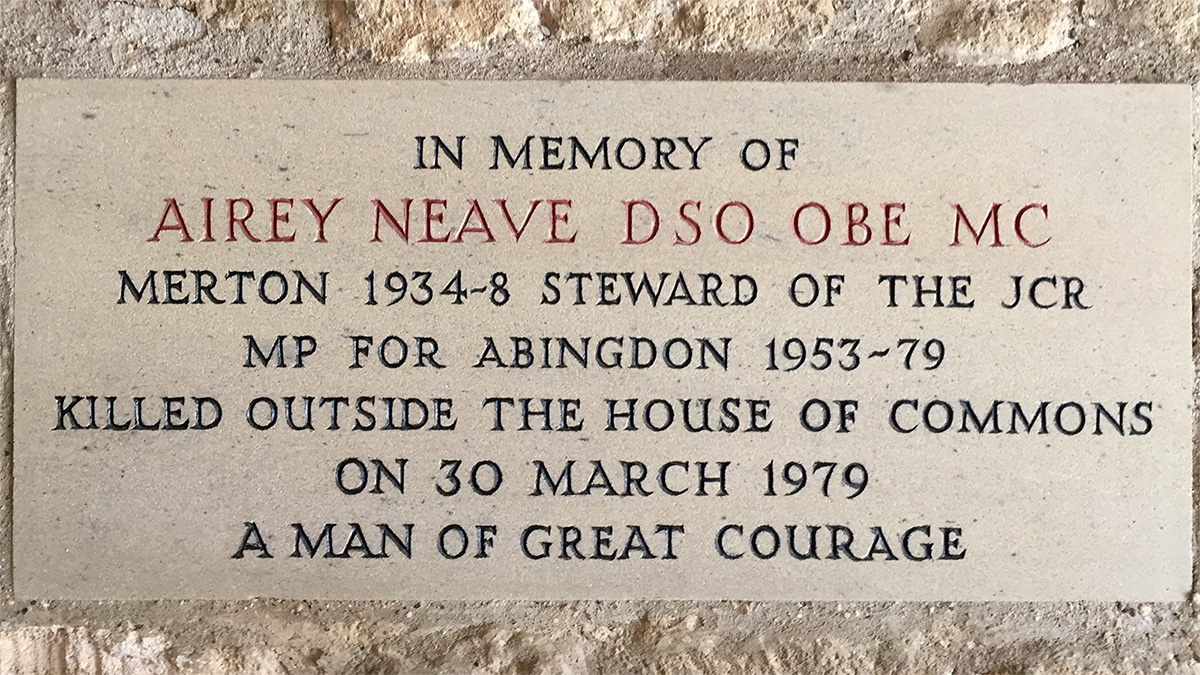
Memorial plaque to Airey Neave at his alma mater, Merton College, Oxford

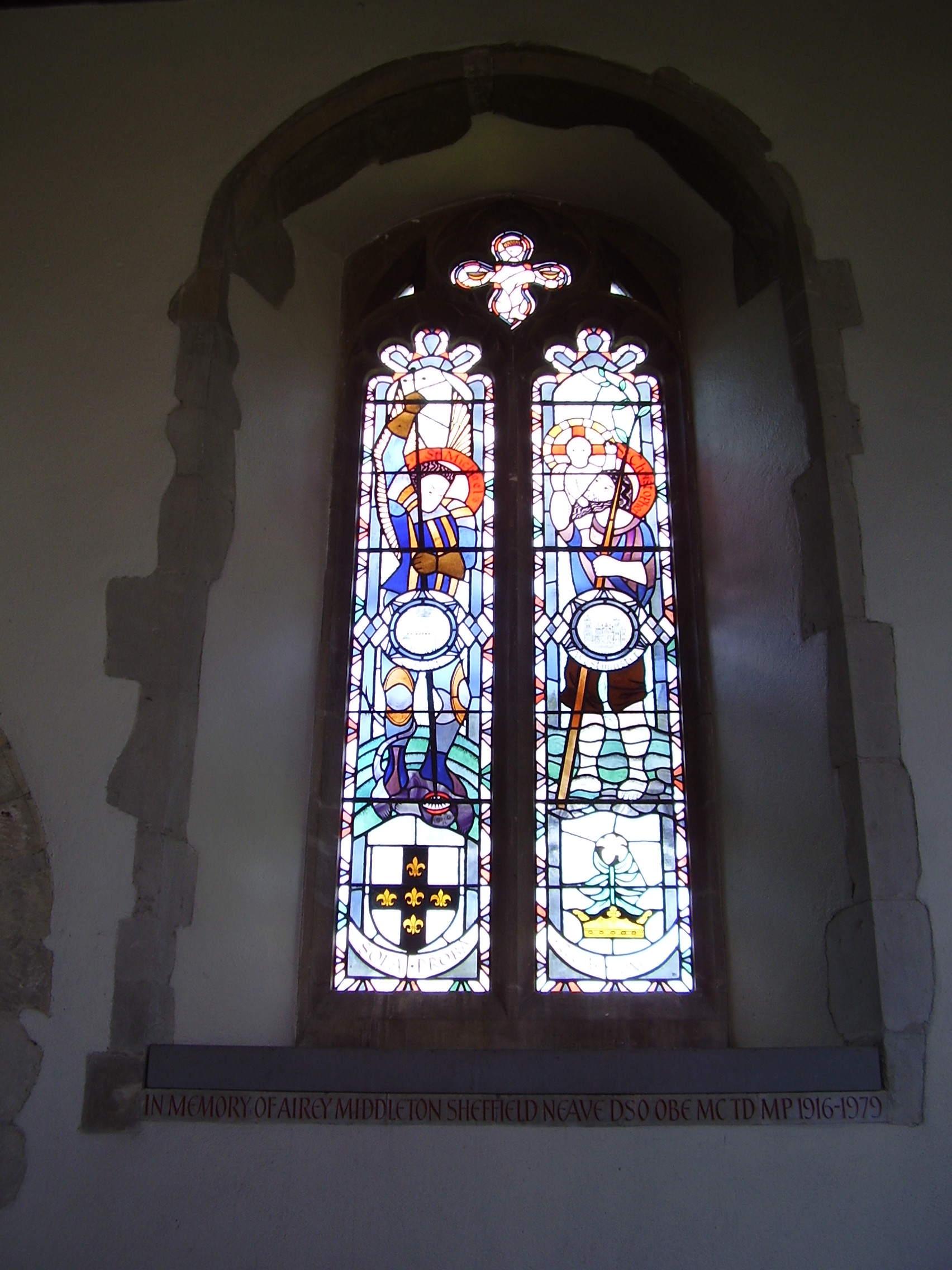
Memorial stained glass window to Airey Neave in Fryerning parish church, Essex

Neave was critically wounded on 30 March 1979 when a car bomb fitted with a tilt-switch exploded under his Vauxhall Cavalier at 14:59 as he drove out of the Palace of Westminster car park. He lost both legs in the explosion and died of his wounds at Westminster Hospital an hour after being rescued from the wrecked car. He was 63.

The Irish National Liberation Army (INLA) afterwards claimed responsibility for the assassination. Neave had been pressing within Conservative Party circles and in Parliament throughout the Troubles for the British Government to abandon its strategy of containment of Irish republican paramilitarism within Northern Ireland, and switch to one of pursuing its military defeat. It is believed that this is what led to his being targeted.

Following his death, Conservative leader Margaret Thatcher said of Neave:

He was one of freedom's warriors. No one knew of the great man he was, except those nearest to him. He was staunch, brave, true, strong; but he was very gentle and kind and loyal. It's a rare combination of qualities. There's no one else who can quite fill them. I, and so many other people, owe so much to him and now we must carry on for the things he fought for and not let the people who got him triumph.

Labour Prime Minister James Callaghan said: "No effort will be spared to bring the murderers to justice and to rid the United Kingdom of the scourge of terrorism."

The INLA issued a statement regarding the assassination in the August 1979 edition of The Starry Plough:

In March, retired terrorist and supporter of capital punishment, Airey Neave, got a taste of his own medicine when an INLA unit pulled off the operation of the decade and blew him to bits inside the 'impregnable' Palace of Westminster. The nauseous Margaret Thatcher snivelled on television that he was an 'incalculable loss'—and so he was—to the British ruling class.

Neave's death came two days after the vote of no confidence which brought down Callaghan's government and a few weeks before the general election, which brought about a Conservative victory and saw Thatcher come to power as Prime Minister. Neave's wife Diana, whom he married on 29 December 1942, was subsequently elevated to the House of Lords as Baroness Airey of Abingdon.

Neave's biographer Paul Routledge met a member of the Irish Republican Socialist Party (the political wing of INLA) who was involved in the killing of Neave and who told Routledge that Neave "would have been very successful at that job [Northern Ireland Secretary]. He would have brought the armed struggle to its knees".

As a result of Neave's assassination the INLA was declared illegal across the whole of the United Kingdom on 2 July 1979. In October 1979, a coroner returning a verdict of unlawful killing following an inquest which revealed the bomb had been attached to the car at Neave's home in Westminster rather than at Parliament. A police investigation at the time did not result in any arrests.

Neave's killing has been the subject of conspiracy theories. Enoch Powell claimed that his death was the result of a British-American conspiracy to secure a united Irish state that would be a part of NATO.

== In media ==
Neave was portrayed by Geoffrey Pounsett in Nuremberg (2000), Dermot Crowley in Margaret (2009), Nicholas Farrell in The Iron Lady (2011) (in a piece of dramatic licence Thatcher is shown in the film as an eyewitness to his death) and Tim McInnerny in the Channel 4 drama Utopia (2014); the drama depicts a fictionalised account of Neave's murder, where he is portrayed as a drinker who colluded with spies and whose assassination was perpetrated by MI5. This led to condemnation of the broadcaster, with Norman Tebbit, a friend and political colleague of Neave, saying "To attack a man like that who is dead and cannot defend himself is despicable".

== Works ==
- 1953 – They Have Their Exits
- 1954 – Little Cyclone
- 1969 – Saturday at MI9 (U.S. title: The Escape Room)
- 1972 – The Flames of Calais: A Soldier's Battle, 1940
- 1978 – Nuremberg (U.S. title: On Trial at Nuremberg)

Parliament of the United Kingdom
Preceded by Sir Ralph Glyn	Member of Parliament for Abingdon; 1953–1979	Succeeded by Thomas Benyon
